= PFL 8 (2025) =

Professional Fighters League MMA event in 2025

- The poster for PFL 8
- Promotion: Professional Fighters League
- Date: August 1, 2025
- Venue: Boardwalk Hall
- City: Atlantic City, New Jersey, United States

Event chronology
PFL Champions Series 2	PFL 8	PFL Africa 2

The PFL 8 mixed martial arts event for the 2025 season of the Professional Fighters League was held on August 1, 2025, at Boardwalk Hall in Atlantic City, New Jersey, United States. This event marked the finals of the single-elimination tournament format in the Welterweight and Featherweight divisions.

== Background ==
The event marked the promotion's 14th visit to Atlantic City and first since PFL 6 (2021) in June 2021.

The event featured the finals of 2025 PFL World Tournament in a welterweight and featherweight divisions.

A featherweight bout between Damion Nelson and Isaiah Diggs was originally scheduled at this event, but the bout was moved to PFL 9 at two weeks later for unknown reasons.

== Results ==
Main card (ESPN / ESPN+)
Weight class				Method	Round	Time	Notes
Welterweight	Thad Jean	def.	Logan Storley	Decision (unanimous) (49–46, 49–46, 48–47)	5	5:00	(Note: 2025 PFL Welterweight Tournament Final.)
Featherweight	Movlid Khaybulaev	def.	Jesus Pinedo	Submission (arm-triangle choke)	5	1:17	(Note: 2025 PFL Featherweight Tournament Final.)
Featherweight	Asaël Adjoudj	def.	Yves Landu	Decision (unanimous) (29–28, 29–28, 29–28)	3	5:00
Middleweight	Jordan Newman	def.	Eslam Abdul Baset	TKO (retirement)	1	5:00
Preliminary card (ESPN+)
Catchweight (160 lb)	Jakub Kaszuba	def.	Sergio Cossio	Decision (unanimous) (29–28, 29–28, 29–28)	3	5:00
Lightweight	Kyle Driscoll	def.	Husein Kadimagomaev	Decision (split) (27–30, 29–28, 30–27)	3	5:00
Featherweight	Frederik Dupras	def.	Nathan Kelly	Technical Submission (guillotine choke)	2	4:38
Welterweight	Sarek Shields	def.	Nick Meck	TKO (doctor stoppage)	1	5:00
Featherweight	Tom Pagliarulo	def.	Matt Turnbull	TKO (knee to the body and punches)	1	4:36

== Tournament brackets ==
=== 2025 PFL Welterweight Tournament ===
Quarter-finals
(Jamaica) Jason Jackson	SUB
(Russia) Andrey Koreshkov	2
(Russia) Mukhamed Berkhamov	1
(Haiti) Thad Jean (Note: Florim Zendeli withdrew from the tournament for unknown reasons and was replaced by Thad Jean.)	KO
(Australia) Joseph Luciano (Note: Magomed Umalatov missed weight (173.6 lb) and he was removed from the tournament. Alternate fighter Joseph Luciano stepped in instead.)	3
(United States) Logan Storley	UD
(Greece) Giannis Bachar	2
(Japan) Masayuki Kikuiri	TKO

Semi-finals
(Jamaica) Jason Jackson	3
(Haiti) Thad Jean	SD
(United States) Logan Storley	UD
(Japan) Masayuki Kikuiri	3

Final
(Haiti) Thad Jean	UD
(United States) Logan Storley	5

=== 2025 PFL Featherweight Tournament ===
Quarter-finals
(Peru) Jesus Pinedo	TKO
(Hungary) Ádám Borics	1
(Brazil) Gabriel Braga	SUB
(Canada) Frederik Dupras (Note: Yves Landu withdrew from the tournament due to injury and was replaced by Frederik Dupras.)	1
(Canada) Jeremy Kennedy	3
(Russia) Movlid Khaybulaev	SD
(Republic of Ireland) Nathan Kelly	1
(South Korea) Kim Tae-kyun	SUB

Semi-finals
(Peru) Jesus Pinedo	TKO
(Brazil) Gabriel Braga	1
(Russia) Movlid Khaybulaev	UD
(South Korea) Kim Tae-kyun	3

Final
(Peru) Jesus Pinedo	5
(Russia) Movlid Khaybulaev	SUB

== See also ==
- 2025 in Professional Fighters League
- List of PFL events
- List of current PFL fighters
