= Logan Storley =

American collegiate wrestler and mixed martial artist

- Born: September 8, 1992 (age 34); Roslyn, South Dakota, U.S.
- Other names: Storm
- Height: 5 ft 9 in (1.75 m)
- Weight: 170 lb (77 kg; 12 st)
- Division: Welterweight
- Reach: 71.5 in (182 cm)
- Style: Wrestling
- Fighting out of: Webster, South Dakota, U.S.
- Team: Kill Cliff FC (2017–present)
- Wrestling: NCAA Division I Wrestling
- Years active: 2015–present

Mixed martial arts record
- Total: 23
- Wins: 19
- By knockout: 9
- By decision: 10
- Losses: 4
- By knockout: 1
- By decision: 3

Other information
- Mixed martial arts record from Sherdog

Logan Storley (born September 8, 1992) is an American professional mixed martial artist and folkstyle wrestler. He competed in the welterweight division of the Professional Fighters League (PFL) and Bellator MMA, where he was the former interim Bellator Welterweight World Champion. As a folkstyle wrestler, he was a four-time NCAA Division I All-American for the Minnesota Golden Gophers and a six-time SDHSAA state champion as a high schooler.

== Background ==
Storley grew up in Roslyn, South Dakota and started wrestling when he was 5 years old. He has a degree in business and marketing.

== Wrestling career ==
=== High school ===
Storley was an accomplished high school wrestler. He was a six-time SDHSAA title holder and graduated from Webster High School with a record of 262 wins and 3 losses throughout his 6 years of eligibility (competing in high school varsity). In 2010, he won the NHSCA National Championship as a junior. He also competed in freestyle, winning the 2009 Fargo Nationals. He was also named the Junior Hodge Trophy winner for 2011.

=== College ===
At college, he also amassed multiple achievements while competing for the Golden Gophers. He became a four-time All-American, placing sixth as a true freshman, fourth as a sophomore, third as a junior, and once again fourth as a senior at the NCAA Division I Championships. At the Big Ten Conference championships, he became the runner-up of the tournament as a freshman (falling to Ed Ruth), placed seventh as a sophomore and fourth as a junior and senior. He graduated in 2015 with a 119–27 record.

== Mixed martial arts career ==
=== Early career ===
Storley amassed an unbeaten record of 5 wins, with all of his wins coming by first-round knockout prior to signing with Bellator.

=== Bellator MMA ===
In his promotional debut, Storley faced Kemmyelle Haley on July 14, 2017, at Bellator 181. He won the fight by technical knockout in the second round.

Storley faced Marc Secor on November 3, 2017, at Bellator 186. He won the fight by unanimous decision in the first non-stoppage win of his career.

Storley faced Joaquin Buckley on April 13, 2018, at Bellator 197. He won the fight by unanimous decision.

Storley faced A.J. Matthews on August 17, 2018, at Bellator 204. He won the fight by second-round technical knockout.

Storley faced Ion Pascu on February 15, 2019, at Bellator 215. He won the fight by unanimous decision.

Storley faced E. J. Brooks on November 8, 2019, at Bellator 233. He won the fight by technical knockout after Brooks was unable to continue due to an arm injury.

Storley was scheduled to face Mark Lemminger on July 24, 2020, at Bellator 242. However, he was forced to pull out of the bout due to an injury on July 16.

Storley faced fellow undefeated mixed martial artist Yaroslav Amosov at Bellator 252 on November 12, 2020. He lost the back-and-forth bout by split decision, marking the first defeat of his career.

Storley was expected to face Killys Mota at Bellator 258 on May 7, 2021. However, Mota withdrew from the bout due to lingering issues after contracting COVID-19. Mota was replaced by Omar Hussein. Hours before the event, the bout was canceled after Hussein was not medically cleared to compete.

Storley faced Dante Schiro on August 20, 2021, at Bellator 265. He won the fight via split decision.

Storley faced Neiman Gracie on February 19, 2022, at Bellator 274. He won the mostly standup bout via unanimous decision.

Storley, replacing Yaroslav Amosov, faced Michael "Venom" Page on May 13, 2022, at Bellator 281 with the bout being for the interim Welterweight title. He won the fight via split decision.

Storley next had a rematch against reigning champion Yaroslav Amosov to unify the title on February 25, 2023, at Bellator 291. He lost the fight by unanimous decision.

Storley headlined against Brennan Ward on August 11, 2023 at Bellator 298. He won the fight via TKO in the second round.

=== Professional Fighters League ===
==== 2024 season ====
In his PFL debut, Storley faced Shamil Musaev on April 19, 2024 at PFL 3 (2024). He lost the fight via knockout in the second round.

Storley was expected to face Laureano Staropoli on June 28, 2024 at PFL 6, but Staropoli withdrew for unknown reasons and was replaced by Luca Poclit. He won the fight via unanimous decision.

==== 2025 season ====
On February 11, 2025, the promotion officially revealed that Storley joined the 2025 PFL Welterweight Tournament. In the opening round, Storley was set to face Magomed Umalatov. However, Umalatov missed weight and was replaced by Joseph Luciano. Storley won the fight by unanimous decision.

In the semifinals, Storley faced at Masayuki Kikuiri at PFL 5 (2025) on June 12, 2025. He won the fight via unanimous decision.

In the finals, Storley faced Thad Jean on August 1, 2025, at PFL 8. He lost the bout by unanimous decision.

==== 2026 ====
Storley faced Florim Zendeli in the main event on May 2, 2026, at PFL Sioux Falls. After Zendeli was deducted two points due to repeated grabbing the fence, Storley won the fight via unanimous decision.

On May 18, 2026, Storley was arrested in Key West on sexual-battery charges after sexually battering a woman in the street naked before being apprehended by the manager of a nearby strip club who witnessed the incident. PFL spokeswoman responded to an inquiry about the incident saying Storley was no longer contracted with the promotion.

== Championships and accomplishments ==
=== Folkstyle wrestling ===
- National Collegiate Athletic Association
  - NCAA Division I All-American out of University of Minnesota (2012, 2013, 2014, 2015)
  - NCAA Division I 174 lb – 6th place out of University of Minnesota (2012)
  - NCAA Division I 174 lb – 4th place out of University of Minnesota (2013, 2015)
  - NCAA Division I 174 lb – 3rd place out of University of Minnesota (2014)
- Big Ten Conference
  - Big Ten Conference 174 lb – 2nd place out of University of Minnesota (2012)
  - Big Ten Conference 174 lb – 7th place out of University of Minnesota (2013)
  - Big Ten Conference 174 lb – 4th place out of University of Minnesota (2014, 2015)
- South Dakota High School Activities Association
  - SDHSAA State Champion out of Webster High School (2006, 2007, 2008, 2009, 2010, 2011)

=== Mixed martial arts ===
- Bellator MMA
  - Interim Bellator Welterweight World Championship (One time)
- Professional Fighters League
  - 2025 PFL Welterweight Tournament runner-up

== Mixed martial arts record ==
Professional record breakdown
23 matches	19 wins	4 losses
By knockout	9	1
By decision	10	3

Res.	Record	Opponent	Method	Event	Date	Round	Time	Location	Notes
Win	19–4	Florim Zendeli	Decision (unanimous)	PFL Sioux Falls: Storley vs. Zendeli	May 2, 2026	3	5:00	Sioux Falls, South Dakota, United States	Zendeli was deducted two points in round 1 due to repeated grabbing the fence.
Loss	18–4	Thad Jean	Decision (unanimous)	PFL 8 (2025)	August 1, 2025	5	5:00	Atlantic City, New Jersey, United States	2025 PFL Welterweight Tournament Final.
Win	18–3	Masayuki Kikuiri	Decision (unanimous)	PFL 5 (2025)	June 12, 2025	3	5:00	Nashville, Tennessee, United States	2025 PFL Welterweight Tournament Semifinal.
Win	17–3	Joseph Luciano	Decision (unanimous)	PFL 1 (2025)	April 3, 2025	3	5:00	Orlando, Florida, United States	2025 PFL Welterweight Tournament Quarterfinal.
Win	16–3	Luca Poclit	Decision (unanimous)	PFL 6 (2024)	June 28, 2024	3	5:00	Sioux Falls, South Dakota, United States	
Loss	15–3	Shamil Musaev	KO (punches)	PFL 3 (2024)	April 19, 2024	2	0:27	Chicago, Illinois, United States	
Win	15–2	Brennan Ward	TKO (punches)	Bellator 298	August 11, 2023	2	4:05	Sioux Falls, South Dakota, United States	
Loss	14–2	Yaroslav Amosov	Decision (unanimous)	Bellator 291	February 25, 2023	5	5:00	Dublin, Ireland	For the Bellator Welterweight World Championship.
Win	14–1	Michael Page	Decision (split)	Bellator 281	May 13, 2022	5	5:00	London, England	Won the interim Bellator Welterweight World Championship.
Win	13–1	Neiman Gracie	Decision (unanimous)	Bellator 274	February 19, 2022	5	5:00	Uncasville, Connecticut, United States	
Win	12–1	Dante Schiro	Decision (split)	Bellator 265	August 20, 2021	3	5:00	Sioux Falls, South Dakota, United States	
Loss	11–1	Yaroslav Amosov	Decision (split)	Bellator 252	November 12, 2020	3	5:00	Uncasville, Connecticut, United States	
Win	11–0	E. J. Brooks	TKO (arm injury)	Bellator 233	November 8, 2019	1	5:00	Thackerville, Oklahoma, United States	
Win	10–0	Ion Pascu	Decision (unanimous)	Bellator 215	February 15, 2019	3	5:00	Uncasville, Connecticut, United States	
Win	9–0	A.J. Matthews	TKO (elbows and punches)	Bellator 204	August 17, 2018	2	3:56	Sioux Falls, South Dakota, United States	
Win	8–0	Joaquin Buckley	Decision (unanimous)	Bellator 197	April 13, 2018	3	5:00	St. Charles, Missouri, United States	
Win	7–0	Matt Secor	Decision (unanimous)	Bellator 186	November 3, 2017	3	5:00	University Park, Pennsylvania, United States	
Win	6–0	Kemmyelle Haley	TKO (elbows)	Bellator 181	July 14, 2017	1	1:44	Thackerville, Oklahoma, United States	
Win	5–0	Andres Murray	TKO (punches)	LFA Fight Night: Sioux Falls	April 29, 2017	1	1:13	Sioux Falls, South Dakota, United States	
Win	4–0	Cody Lincoln	TKO (punches)	RFA 37	April 15, 2016	2	0:13	Sioux Falls, South Dakota, United States	
Win	3–0	Lemetra Griffin	TKO (punches)	RFA 36	March 4, 2016	1	0:33	Prior Lake, Minnesota, United States	
Win	2–0	Marc Hummel	TKO (punches)	RFA 32	November 6, 2015	1	3:17	Prior Lake, Minnesota, United States	
Win	1–0	Bill Mees	TKO (punches)	RFA 29	August 21, 2015	1	2:32	Sioux Falls, South Dakota, United States	

== NCAA record ==
NCAA Championships Matches
Res.	Record	Opponent	Score	Date	Event
2015 NCAA Championships 4th at 174 lbs
Loss	16-7	Robert Kokesh	SV 4-6	March 21, 2015	2015 NCAA Division I Wrestling Championships
Win	16-6	Kyle Crutchmer	TB 9-7	March 21, 2015	2015 NCAA Division I Wrestling Championships
Win	15-6	Cody Walters	3-0	March 21, 2015	2015 NCAA Division I Wrestling Championships
Loss	14-6	Mike Evans	TB 1-2	March 21, 2015	2015 NCAA Division I Wrestling Championships
Win	14-5	Zach Brunson	4-0	March 21, 2015	2015 NCAA Division I Wrestling Championships
Win	13-5	Brian Harvey	11-9	March 21, 2015	2015 NCAA Division I Wrestling Championships
2014 NCAA Championships (bronze) at 174 lbs
Win	12-5	Robert Kokesh	TB 3-1	March 22, 2014	2014 NCAA Division I Wrestling Championships
Win	11-5	Matt Brown	SV 3-1	March 22, 2014	2014 NCAA Division I Wrestling Championships
Loss	10-5	Andrew Howe	3-6	March 22, 2014	2014 NCAA Division I Wrestling Championships
Win	10-4	Robert Kokesh	TB 6-4	March 22, 2014	2014 NCAA Division I Wrestling Championships
Win	9-4	Stephen Doty	5-4	March 22, 2014	2014 NCAA Division I Wrestling Championships
Win	8-4	Caleb Marsh	5-2	March 22, 2014	2014 NCAA Division I Wrestling Championships
2013 NCAA Championships 4th at 174 lbs
Loss	7-4	Robert Kokesh	SV 1-3	March 23, 2013	2013 NCAA Division I Wrestling Championships
Win	7-3	Nick Heflin	3-2	March 23, 2013	2013 NCAA Division I Wrestling Championships
Loss	6-3	Matt Brown	2-3	March 23, 2013	2013 NCAA Division I Wrestling Championships
Win	6-2	Michael Evans	3-2	March 23, 2013	2013 NCAA Division I Wrestling Championships
Win	5-2	Matt Mougin	MD 9-1	March 23, 2013	2013 NCAA Division I Wrestling Championships
Win	4-2	Bryce Hammond	3-1	March 23, 2013	2013 NCAA Division I Wrestling Championships
2012 NCAA Championships 6th at 174 lbs
Loss	3-2	Jordan Blanton	0-1	March 17, 2012	2012 NCAA Division I Wrestling Championships
Loss	3-1	Ed Ruth	TF 1-17	March 17, 2012	2012 NCAA Division I Wrestling Championships
Win	3-0	Luke Lofthouse	4-2	March 17, 2012	2012 NCAA Division I Wrestling Championships
Win	2-0	Lance Bryson	2-0	March 17, 2012	2012 NCAA Division I Wrestling Championships
Win	1-0	Levi Clemons	MD 11-2	March 17, 2012	2012 NCAA Division I Wrestling Championships

== See also ==
- List of male mixed martial artists
