= Yaroslav Amosov =

Ukrainian mixed martial arts fighter

- Born: Yaroslav Amosov; 9 September 1993 (age 33); Irpin, Kyiv Oblast, Ukraine
- Native name: Ярослав Амосов
- Other names: Dynamo
- Height: 5 ft 11 in (180 cm)
- Weight: 170 lb (77 kg; 12 st 2 lb)
- Division: Middleweight; Welterweight
- Reach: 75 in (191 cm)
- Style: Sambo
- Fighting out of: Irpin, Ukraine
- Team: Combat Dobro; Amosov Team; American Top Team
- Years active: 2012–present

Mixed martial arts record
- Total: 31
- Wins: 30
- By knockout: 9
- By submission: 13
- By decision: 8
- Losses: 1
- By knockout: 1

Other information
- Mixed martial arts record from Sherdog

Yaroslav Amosov (born 9 September 1993) is a Ukrainian mixed martial artist who currently competes in the Welterweight division of the Ultimate Fighting Championship. He has previously fought in Bellator MMA, where he is the former Bellator Welterweight Champion. In July 2023, Amosov reached #7 in World Welterweight rankings according to Fight Matrix. As of November 14, 2026, he is #14 in the Meta UFC welterweight rankings.

He is a four-time world sambo champion, a two-time European and Eurasia champion, and European Cup winner. Amosov is also the winner of many national and international competitions.

== Sambo career ==
Yaroslav Amosov was born on 9 September 1993, in the city of Irpin, Kyiv region. He began to actively engage in combat sambo at the age of fifteen at the initiative of his stepfather, trained at the Kyiv club "Hermes" under the guidance of coaches Fedor Mykolayovych Seredyuk and Vadym Mykhailovych Korytny.

He achieved his first serious success at the adult international level in 2012, when he won the European Combat Sambo Cup. Subsequently, he achieved significant success in this martial arts: he became the world champion three times according to the version of the international federation WCSF (2013, 2014, 2015) and twice the champion of Europe according to the version of the European federation ECSF (2013, 2014). In September 2014, he became the champion of Eurasia in professional combat sambo, defeating the experienced Russian fighter Shamil Zavurov in the final with a suffocating reception. He repeatedly won championships and Cups of Ukraine in combat sambo. In March 2015, he was awarded the honorary title "Honored Master of Sports of Ukraine" for his outstanding sports achievements.

In September 2012, though early into his Combat Sambo career, Amosov finished in third place against Ikram Aliskerov in European Combat Sambo Federation sanctioned competition that was being hosted in Moldova. In December of that same year, Amosov again came in third place against Aliskerov in World Combat Sambo Federation sanctioned competition that was held in Moscow.

== Mixed martial arts career ==
In June 2016, after winning sixteen fights in a row in Tech-Krep FC, Amosov beat Croatian fighter Roberto Soldić to win the vacant Tech-Krep welterweight title.

In 2017, Amosov made two successful defences of the Tech-Krep FC welterweight title against Diogo Cavalcanti and Nathan Oliveira. Amosov won both fights via submission in the first round.

=== Bellator MMA ===
In November 2017. Bellator announced they had signed Yaroslav Amosov to the promotion following an undefeated run of 19 fights which only included two decisions.

Amosov made his Bellator debut against Gerald Harris on 13 July 2018 at Bellator 202. Amosov won the fight via unanimous decision.

Amosov then faced Erick Silva on 16 February 2019 at Bellator 216. Amosov won the fight via unanimous decision.

Amosov then faced David Rickels on 24 August 2019 at Bellator 225 in a catchweight bout. Amosov defeated Rickels via brabo choke in the second round. This was Rickels' first submission loss in his career.

Amosov then faced three-time NCAA Division I Wrestling Champion from Penn State Ed Ruth on 21 February 2020 at Bellator 239. Amosov won the fight via unanimous decision.

Amosov faced Mark Lemminger on 21 August 2020 at Bellator 244. He won the fight via TKO between rounds 1 and 2 due to a cut rendering Lemminger unable to continue.

Amosov faced four-time NCAA Division I All-American from Minnesota Logan Storley on 12 November 2020, at Bellator 252. He won the back-and-forth bout by split decision.

==== Bellator Welterweight Championship ====
Amosov fought for the Bellator Welterweight World Championship against current champ Douglas Lima at Bellator 260 on 11 June 2021. He won the fight by unanimous decision by outwrestling Lima throughout all 5 rounds.

Amosov was scheduled to make his first title defense against Michael Page on 13 May 2022, at Bellator 281. However, Amosov was forced to pull out of the bout due to his participation in the war in Ukraine on the side of Ukraine, leaving Page to compete against Logan Storley for the interim title.

After being unable to fight for all of 2022 due to the war, Amosov returned to defend his title in a rematch against interim champion Logan Storley on 25 February 2023, at Bellator 291. He successfully defended the title after defeating Storley by unanimous decision, the fight scored 50–45 on all three judges scorecards.

Amosov made his second title defense against Jason Jackson on 17 November 2023 at Bellator 301. He lost via knockout in the third round, marking his first professional loss in MMA.

On 13 September 2024, Amosov announced that he was no longer under contract with the promotion after six years.

=== Cage Fury FC ===
Amosov faced Curtis Millender on 14 March 2025, at Cage Fury FC 140, and won the bout via first round submission.

=== Ultimate Fighting Championship ===
Amosov made his Ultimate Fighting Championship debut against Neil Magny on 13 December 2025 at UFC on ESPN 73. He won the fight via an anaconda choke in round one.

Amosov faced Joel Álvarez on 9 May 2026 at UFC 328. He won the fight via an arm-triangle choke in round two. This fight earned him a $100,000 Performance of the Night award.

Amosov was scheduled to face Ian Machado Garry on 12 December 2026 at UFC 335. However, the bout was shifted to 5 December 2026 one week earlier at UFC Fight Night 295 to serve at the five-round co-main event for undisclosed reasons.

== Personal life ==
During the 2022 Russian invasion of Ukraine, after seeing his family evacuated to a safe zone, Amosov stayed in Ukraine and joined several other notable fighters, including former boxing heavyweight champion Wladimir Klitschko and his brother, former heavyweight champion Vitali Klitschko, current unified WBA (Super), IBF, WBO and IBO heavyweight champion Oleksandr Usyk, and former lightweight champion Vasiliy Lomachenko, in defending Ukraine from the Russian invasion. During this time, Amosov was the Bellator Welterweight Champion. After the liberation of his hometown Irpin from the battle over the town, Amosov published a video of himself rescuing the Bellator Welterweight Champion belt, which was hidden at his mother's home.

== Championships and accomplishments ==
=== Mixed martial arts ===
- Ultimate Fighting Championship
  - Performance of the Night (One time) vs. Joel Álvarez
- Bellator MMA
  - Bellator Welterweight World Championship (One time, former)
    - One successful title defence
  - First Ukrainian-born champion in Bellator MMA history
- Tech-Krep FC
  - Tech-Krep FC Welterweight Championship (One time)
    - Two successful title defenses

=== Sambo ===
- World Combat Sambo Championship Bronze Medalist in 2012 at 82kg
- European Combat Sambo Championship Bronze Medalist in 2012 at 82kg
- Combat Jiu-Jitsu World Cup Gold Medalist in 2013 at 92kg
- World Combat Sambo Championship Gold Medalist in 2014 at 82kg
- Combat Jiu-Jitsu World Championship Gold Medalist in 2014 at 84kg
- Combat Sambo Eurasia Championship Gold Medalist in 2014 at 82kg

== Mixed martial arts record ==
Professional record breakdown
31 matches	30 wins	1 loss
By knockout	9	1
By submission	13	0
By decision	8	0

Res.	Record	Opponent	Method	Event	Date	Round	Time	Location	Notes
Win	30–1	Joel Álvarez	Submission (arm-triangle choke)	UFC 328	9 May 2026	2	1:13	Newark, New Jersey, United States	Performance of the Night.
Win	29–1	Neil Magny	Submission (anaconda choke)	UFC on ESPN: Royval vs. Kape	13 December 2025	1	3:14	Las Vegas, Nevada, United States	
Win	28–1	Curtis Millender	Submission (anaconda choke)	Cage Fury FC 140	14 March 2025	1	4:17	Philadelphia, Pennsylvania, United States	Catchweight (183 lb) bout.
Loss	27–1	Jason Jackson	KO (punches)	Bellator 301	17 November 2023	3	2:08	Chicago, Illinois, United States	Lost the Bellator Welterweight World Championship.
Win	27–0	Logan Storley	Decision (unanimous)	Bellator 291	25 February 2023	5	5:00	Dublin, Ireland	Defended and unified the Bellator Welterweight World Championship.
Win	26–0	Douglas Lima	Decision (unanimous)	Bellator 260	11 June 2021	5	5:00	Uncasville, Connecticut, United States	Won the Bellator Welterweight World Championship.
Win	25–0	Logan Storley	Decision (split)	Bellator 252	12 November 2020	3	5:00	Uncasville, Connecticut, United States	
Win	24–0	Mark Lemminger	TKO (doctor stoppage)	Bellator 244	21 August 2020	1	5:00	Uncasville, Connecticut, United States	Catchweight (175 lb) bout.
Win	23–0	Ed Ruth	Decision (unanimous)	Bellator 239	21 February 2020	3	5:00	Thackerville, Oklahoma, United States	
Win	22–0	David Rickels	Submission (brabo сhoke)	Bellator 225	24 August 2019	2	4:05	Bridgeport, Connecticut, United States	Catchweight (175 lb) bout.
Win	21–0	Erick Silva	Decision (unanimous)	Bellator 216	16 February 2019	3	5:00	Uncasville, Connecticut, United States	
Win	20–0	Gerald Harris	Decision (unanimous)	Bellator 202	13 July 2018	3	5:00	Thackerville, Oklahoma, United States	
Win	19–0	Nathan Oliveira	Submission (anaconda choke)	Tech-Krep FC: Prime Selection 17	18 August 2017	1	3:20	Krasnodar, Russia	Defended the Tech-KREP FC Welterweight Championship.
Win	18–0	Diogo Cavalcanti	Submission (north-south choke)	Tech-Krep FC: Prime Selection 12	18 March 2017	1	4:48	Krasnodar, Russia	Defended the Tech-KREP FC Welterweight Championship.
Win	17–0	Roberto Soldić	Decision (split)	Tech-Krep FC: Prime Selection 8	18 June 2016	3	5:00	Krasnodar, Russia	Won the vacant Tech-KREP FC Welterweight Championship.
Win	16–0	Khasanbek Abdulaev	TKO (punches)	Tech-Krep FC: Southern Front 3	3 March 2016	2	2:47	Krasnodar, Russia	
Win	15–0	Maxim Konovalov	Submission (anaconda choke)	Tech-Krep FC: Battle in Siberia	12 February 2016	1	2:34	Novosibirsk, Russia	
Win	14–0	Islam Berzegov	Submission (rear-naked choke)	Tech-Krep FC: Prime Selection 7	9 October 2015	1	1:27	Krasnodar, Russia	Middleweight bout.
Win	13–0	Diego Gonzalez	KO (punch)	Tech-Krep FC: Prime Selection 4	24 July 2015	2	2:38	Krasnodar, Russia	Welterweight debut.
Win	12–0	Ravil Risaev	Submission (north-south choke)	Tech-Krep FC: Ermak Prime Challenge	3 April 2015	1	1:27	Anapa, Russia	
Win	11–0	Avtandil Gachechiladze	Submission (armbar)	European Combat Sambo Federation: Steel Warriors	5 March 2015	2	1:45	Kyiv, Ukraine	
Win	10–0	Oleg Olenichev	Decision (unanimous)	Tech-Krep FC: Battle of Heroes	12 December 2014	3	5:00	Saint Petersburg, Russia	
Win	9–0	Boris Selanov	TKO (punches)	Grand European FC: Mega Fight	22 November 2014	1	3:40	Kyiv, Ukraine	
Win	8–0	Aydin Aikhan	TKO (punches)	European Combat Sambo Federation: Ukraine vs. Turkey	18 September 2014	1	1:40	Kyiv, Ukraine	
Win	7–0	Aleksey Nimirovich	TKO (punches)	Combat Sambo Federation of Ukraine: Voshod Open Cup	26 July 2014	1	2:40	Kyiv, Ukraine	
Win	6–0	Andrei Shalavai	TKO (punches)	Combat Sambo Federation of Ukraine: Voshod Open Cup	26 July 2014	1	3:10	Kyiv, Ukraine	
Win	5–0	Valeri Shpak	Submission (armbar)	Grand European FC: Warriors Empire	8 December 2013	1	2:50	Kyiv, Ukraine	
Win	4–0	Vadim Sandulskiy	Submission (rear-naked choke)	League S-70: Plotforma Cup 2013	17 August 2013	3	3:03	Sochi, Russia	Catchweight (176 lb) bout.
Win	3–0	Vitaliy Matornika	Submission (rear-naked choke)	Combat Sambo Federation of Ukraine: MMA Kiev Cup 2	2 April 2013	1	4:47	Kyiv, Ukraine	
Win	2–0	Artiom Cula	TKO (punches)	European Combat Sambo Federation: Battle of Bessarabia	24 March 2013	2	1:49	Chișinău, Moldova	
Win	1–0	Vitaliy Maystrenko	TKO (punches)	Combat Sambo Federation of Ukraine: MMA Kyiv Cup 1	14 June 2012	1	4:49	Kyiv, Ukraine	Middleweight debut.

== See also ==
- List of current UFC fighters
- List of male mixed martial artists
- List of multi-sport athletes
- List of multi-sport champions
