= Mukhamed Berkhamov =

Russian mixed martial artist

Mukhamed Ruslanovich Berkhamov
- Born: January 27, 1994 (age 32); Nalchik, Kabardino-Balkaria, Russia
- Other names: Cherkes (current); The Red Devil (former)
- Height: 6 ft 0 in (183 cm)
- Weight: 170 lb (77 kg; 12 st 2 lb)
- Division: Welterweight (2013–present)
- Reach: 73 in (185 cm)
- Style: Combat Sambo; Army Hand-to-Hand Combat; Russian Catch Wrestling
- Stance: Southpaw
- Fighting out of: Nalchik, Kabardino-Balkaria, Russia; Deerfield Beach, Florida, U.S.
- Team: Kill Cliff FC; Team Alligator Nalchic; Baksan Fighting Club
- Trainer: Beslan Zhamurzov (Head coach at Team Alligator Nalchic); Henri Hooft (Head coach at Kill Cliff FC; Greg Jones (Wrestling coach at Kill Cliff FC)
- Rank: Master of Sport in Combat Sambo; Master of Sport in Army Hand-to-Hand Combat
- Years active: 2013–present

Mixed martial arts record
- Total: 24
- Wins: 18
- By knockout: 3
- By submission: 9
- By decision: 6
- Losses: 5
- By knockout: 2
- By submission: 1
- By decision: 2
- No contests: 1

Other information
- University: Kabardino-Balkarian State Agrarian University
- Mixed martial arts record from Sherdog

Mukhamed Berkhamov (Russian: Мухамед Русланович Берхамов; Kabardian: Мухьамед Руслан и къу Берхам; born January 27, 1994) is a Russian professional mixed martial artist. He competes in the welterweight division and has fought in Absolute Championship Berkut (ACB), where he was the former ACB Welterweight World Champion. A professional competitor since 2015, Berkhamov has also fought in Bellator MMA and the Professional Fighters League (PFL).

Berkhamov was also the winner of the 2015 Tech-KREP FC Welterweight Grand Prix. Berkhamov who has a background in wrestling, is a national champion in Russian catch wrestling, the champion of the Armed Forces in army hand-to-hand combat, and a recipient of the Junior's World Cup in combat sambo.

== Background ==
Berkhamov was born in the city of Baksan in the Kabardino-Balkarian Republic and is of Kabardian ethnicity, an eastern branch of the Circassian nation. He graduated from the Municipal State General Educational Institution Secondary General Educational School No. 4 of the Baksan Urban District (МКОУ СОШ No.4 г.о. Баксан). Subsequently, he pursued higher education at the Kabardino-Balkarian State Agrarian University.

During his academic journey, Berkhamov concurrently mastered combat sambo and hand-to-hand combat, honing his skills both at School No. 4 and later at the Kabardino-Balkarian State Agrarian University. His dedication to martial arts began with boxing and Russian catch wrestling, which established the groundwork for his impending fruition in hand-to-hand combat.

Berkhamov's prowess in martial arts soon became evident as he achieved numerous noted titles. He was crowned National Champion in Russian Catch Wrestling, Republican Champion in hand-to-hand combat, and North Caucasian Federal District Champion in hand-to-hand combat. His achievements extended to boxing, where he triumphed in republican boxing tournaments and secured victories in two all-Russian class "B" boxing tournaments. Additionally, Berkhamov holds the title of North Caucasian Federal District Champion in grappling.

== Mixed martial arts career ==
Amateur Mixed Martial Arts Career

Mukhamed Berkhamov, amateur mixed martial arts started in 2011. He competed across several tournaments in Russia. Below is an overview of his amateur journey, highlighting significant achievements, victories, and losses.

Berkhamov's amateur career gained momentum in 2011 when he emerged as the FCF Absolute Cup Welterweight Tournament Championship held in capital city of Nalchik, Kabardino-BalkariaThe Cherkes earned consecutive victories against various opponents, securing the championship title on May 15. This tournament marked the beginning of his fruitful career in amateur mixed martial arts.

In Sep 26, 2014, Berkhamov competed in the Cup of Russia, held in the city of Mytishchi, facing formidable competition. During the tournament, he secured a win against future PFL mainstay and fellow Kavkaz fighter, Magomed "The Prince" Umalatov via rear-naked choke in the first round. However, his campaign ended in the later stages with a loss to Vitaly Makiev via TKO in the second round.

On March 1, 2015, Berkhamov's had a fruitful run at 2015 Amateur MMA Cup of Nalchik, where he emerged as the gold medalist in the Welterweight division. Over the course of the event, Berkhamov defeated multiple opponents, including Abutalib "Butta" Khalilov, to secure the championship title.

On October 25, at the 2015 North Caucasus MMA Championship, Berkhamov earned the bronze medal in the Welterweight category in city of Grozny. The Cherkes was defeated in semi-finals by Arsen Daudgadzhiev on April 18.

Berkhamov delivered a strong showing at the 2015 Russian Amateur MMA Championship, winning multiple matches to claim a bronze medal, on October 25. On Day 1, he defeated two opponents including fellow Kavkaz fighter. Anvar Chergesov (who was first double champion in Russian MMA history). His run concluded on Day 2 with a round 1 armbar loss to Magomed Umalatov, whom he had faced previously in the MMA Cup of Russia.

=== Pro MMA career ===
Berkhamov made his professional MMA debut on January 19, 2013, as he competed in the Oplot Challenge 28 tournament organized by the Ukrainian organization Oplot Challenge. He achieved a unanimous decision victory over local fighter Artem Shokalo. Throughout that year, Berkhamov participated in three more tournaments, competing in the 77 kg weight category.

On May 26, 2013, at the Emperor Fighting Championship 3 in Yaroslavl, Berkhamov secured a first-round victory by anaconda choke against Nver Kagramalyan of Russia.

On August 19, 2013, at the Ahimas Promotion SPB Fighter 5 in St. Petersburg, Berkhamov faced Marif "Piranha" Piraev of Russia, who had an undefeated record of 8–0. Berkhamov lost the bout by unanimous decision.

On November 30, 2013, at the Oplot Challenge 90 in Kharkov, Berkhamov achieved another first-round victory by anaconda choke against Tofiq Musayev, a fighter from Azerbaijan and world champion in wushu sanda and future RIZIN Lightweight Grand Prix Champion.

In 2015, Berkhamov, nicknamed "Cherkes," competed under the auspices of major Russian promotions ACB and Tech-Krep FC. He maintained a five-match winning streak, finishing four of his opponents by submission.

=== Absolute Championship Berkut (ACB) ===
In his debut fight for the ACB organization, Berkhamov was matched against veteran Venezuelan mixed martial artist Ronny Alexander Landaeta Utrera. The bout served as the main event of the ACB 28 - Young Eagles 4 card; the Cherkes fighter secured a victory by submitting the Venezuelan Landaeta with an armbar in the third round of the fight.

On May 20, 2016, at the ACB 38 event in Rostov-on-Don, Berkhamov achieved his first knockout victory. He defeated Russian fighter Stanislav Vlasenko, a world champion in pankration, in just 25 seconds of the opening round. This victory earned the Cherkes fighter earned him first of his performance of the night award from the ACB organization. This victory allowed Berkhamov to enter into ACB Welterweight title contenders conversation.

On October 22, 2016, Berkhamov was set face-off against former D1 Wrestler and BJJ Black Belt, Jesse "JT Money" Taylor at the main card of ACB 48: Abdulvakhabov vs. Bagov. He defeated "JT Money" Taylor via armbar in the very first round of the main card bout. This victory earned the Cherkes fighter another performance of the night bonus.

On March 24, 2017, Berkhamov was booked against future Pankration World Champion and BJJ World Champion, Sharaf "Sherkhan" Davlatmurodov of Tajikstan, who was undefeated prospect back then, as a headlining fight at ACB 55: Davlatmurodov vs. Berkhamov card. Berkhamov submitted his fellow Kavkaz opponent "Sherkhan" Davlatmurodov via armbar in round two of the fight. This earned Berkhamov performance of the night award ACB management.

=== ACB Welterweight Champion ===
Five months later on August 19 of the same year, the Cherkes fighter was booked in a title fight against than ACB Welterweight champion, Brett Fudoshin Cooper of America, as a main event fight at ACB 67: Berkhamov vs, Cooper card. The fight ended in the 32nd second of the second round - after a concussive left punch from "Cherkess", the referee recorded a knockout. Thereby, becoming the youngest active champion in the ACB MMA promotion. Berkhamov was eventually gifted Mercedes-Benz car as reward for his title victory.

On February 16, 2018, Berkhamov was scheduled to defend his world title belt against his fellow republic man Albert Tumenov as a main event fight at ACB 80: Berkhamov vs. Tumenov card. Both fighters confessed of initially hesitating to fight each other as it would stroke nationalist hatred in their native state of Kabardino-Balkaria. On January 2, Berkhamov suffered a major injury, after breaking his left hand during the training camp. The Cherkes was quickly replaced by American martial artist Nah-Shon "The Rock-N-Rolla" Burrell, by ACB management.

Three months later on May 5 of the same year, Berkhamov was scheduled to defend his title belt against his Kavkaz compatriot of Chechen origin (former Pro FC and ACB Welterweight champion), at ACB 86: Raisov vs Balaev card. Alas, Berkhamov suffered second injury on the same arm, as he forced to withdraw from his title defence fight against Isaev. The Cherkes was immediately replaced by Ciro "Bad Boy" Rodrigues by the ACB team, after Berkhamov withdrawal.

On September 8, 2018, the Cherkes grappler Berkhamov, was booked to defend his world championship title against Albert Tumenov for the second time, as a main event bout at ACB 89: Krasnodar card. However, on August 15, 2018, Berkhamov had tear his knee ligament during the fight camp. The Cherkes shared x-ray scan of his injury on his Instagram account, where he announced that he will vacating the ACB World Welterweight belt due to long-term treatment process required for treating torn knee ligament. Berkhamov was promptly replaced by Brazilian mixed martial artist Ciro "Bad Boy" Rodrigues, as a result the Welterweight title bout with Tumenov was demoted to co-main event fight.

Due to lengthy injury recovery process, Berkhamov's next fight took place on August 19, 2019. The Cherkes was scheduled to face off against the ex-Jungle Fight Welterweight champion & Qualify Combat Champion, Ciro "Bad Boy" Rodrigues of Brazil, as a co-main event bout on ACA 97: Johnson vs. Goncharov card. The fight went the distance as Cherkes defeated the "Bad Boy" Rodrigues via unanimous decision.

After successfully defeating "Bad Boy" Rodrigues, Berkhamov enhanced his record to 13–0. Among these victories, eight were achieved through submission (62%), two by knockout (15%), and three by judges' decisions (23%).

Overall, his record for ACB/ACA organization was streak of six wins, five of which were finishes. Following this achievement, the Cherkes fighter left ACA MMA organization, as he aimed to compete in the American league. Although he did not come to terms with the UFC, Bellator MMA recognized his potential and promptly signed him.

=== Bellator MMA ===
Berkhamov debut opponent for Bellator MMA was Guamanian fighter, Herman "The Titan" Terrado on April 2, 2021, at Bellator 255: Pitbull vs. Sanchez 2 card at Mohegan Sun Arena in Uncasville, Connecticut. However, Berkhamov missed weight by 2.8 pounds, leading to the bout being scrapped from the lineup due to Berkhamov's miss.

After two years, on October 16, 2021, Berkhamov debut fight for Bellator MMA was scheduled against then number tenth ranked Bellator African-American fighter Jaleel "The Realest" Willis at Bellator 268 - Nemkov vs. Anglickas card, in Footprint Center arena, in the city of Phoenix, Arizona. The Cherkes submitted African-American brawler Willis via guillotine choke in first round of the bout. With this, the Berkhamov improved his pro MMA record to 14–0 victory streak with 64% (11 out of 14) finish rate; of which nine were submissions, two were KOs and three were judges' decisions.

For Berkhamov second for Bellator MMA, he was scheduled to face-off against ex-Strikeforce & UFC veteran, Lorenz "The Moonson" Larkin on the main card of Bellator 283: Lima vs. Jackson event, held in the venue of Emerald Queen Casino and Hotel, Tacoma, Washington, United States. The match was halted at 2 minutes and 52 seconds into the first round due to an inadvertent elbow strike by Larkin on back of Berkhamov head during his (Berkhamov) takedown attempt.

Consequently, the referee Raphael Davis who after consulting with the judges opted to discontinue the bout, rendering it a no contest. After the fight Berkhamov along with Floridian fighter Roman Faraldo were both given indefinite suspension by Bellator's medical team.

Following the no contest, the matchmakers decided to rebook Berkhamov fight against Larkin at featured prelim bout of Bellator 290: Bader vs. Fedor 2 card, held in the indoor arena of Kia Forum, in the city of Inglewood, California, United States, on February 4, 2023. Larkin KO'd the Cherkes fighter in first round of the fight, after Larkin connected powerful elbow to the side of Berkhamov's head, during the clinch exchange. This was the first time Cherkes combatant suffered a loss via KO.

On October 7, 2023, Berkhamov last fight for Bellator organization came against former Strikeforce veteran of Guam, Herman "The Titan" Terrado, on the prelims of Bellator 300: Nurmagomedov vs. Primus card held in the indoor stadium of Pechanga Arena in the city of San Diego, California, United States. This bout was scheduled to be held at contracted weight of 180 lb. Berkhamov dominates the Guamanian fighter Terrado via 30-27 unaimous decision on all 3 judges scorecard.

=== Professional Fighters League (PFL) ===
On August 23, 2024, Berkhamov debut for PFL organization was scheduled against two-time PFL's World Welterweight Champion Ray Cooper III at prelims of PFL 9 card at The Anthem stadium in Washington D.C., United States. The Cherkes defeated Ray Cooper III via split decision. The media members however all scored the fight 30-27 unanimous decision in Berkhamov favour.

On April 3, 2025, Berkhamov second fight for PFL came against the Haitian-American fighter Thad Jean at prelims of PFL World Tournament 1: Jackson vs. Koreshkov card at Universal Studios Florida stadium in Orlando, Florida, United States. The Jean KO'd the Berkhamov in the very first round of the fight via punches.

On June 12, 2025, the Cherkes third fight for the organization was booked against American submission specialist Kendly "The Highlander" St. Louis at prelims of PFL 5: Clash of the Caribbean card at Nashville Municipal Auditorium in Nashville, Tennessee, United States. Berkhamov started strong, landing sharp counters, low kicks, and a flying knee while evinced his defensive acumen and scrambling ability. However, in the third round, St. Louis capitalized on a scramble to take Berkhamov's back, locked in a body triangle, and secured a rear-naked choke at 3:21, handing Berkhamov the first submission loss of his career and eliminating him from the 2025 PFL Welterweight Tournament.

== Personal life ==
Berkhamov was previously known as "The Red Devil," a moniker inspired by his distinctive ginger hair and beard.

He now goes by the nickname Cherkes, which simply means Circassian in Russian. In Kabardino-Balkaria, where many identify as Circassian (specifically of Kabardian tribe), the name reflects Berkhamov's ethnic origin and local identity.

Berkhamov lost three times in his entire pro MMA career. However, prior to Berkhamov defeat against Lorenz Larkin, Kendly St. Louis & Thad Jean, the Cherkes fighter did lose against estimable MMA fighter of Rutul origin, Marif Telmanovich Piraev, in an exhibition MMA bout via a unanimous decision. This was not counted on his pro fight record by Sherdog.

Berkhamov carries the repute of having two master of sports in two different combat sports at amateur level. He is master of sports both in Combat Sambo and Army Hand-to-Hand Combat.

During the holy month of Ramzan, Berkhamov typically modifies his training routine to a less intense schedule, incorporating light grappling and pad work. He places greater emphasis on weight training, including lifting weights, and gradual physical conditioning to regain muscle mass lost during fasting hours.

Sometime in 2018, Berkhamov in preparation for his ACB title defence bout against Albert "Einstein" Tumenov, trained at the renowned American Kickboxing Academy (AKA) gym, where he (Berkhamov) joined notable fighters Khabib "The Eagle" Nurmagomedov and Islam Makhachev, who were preparing for their respective bouts.

Both Berkhamov and Tumenov were hesitant to face each other, fearing it would ignite ethnic tensions between Balkars (Tumenov) and Kabardians (Berkhamov). As both of them comes from the Kabardino-Balkarian Republic in Russia. To ease tensions between the two groups, both fighters called for mutual respect, emphasizing their shared faith (Islam) and common homeland, the republic of Kabardino-Balkaria. They also advised their fans not to succumb to nationalist hatred. However, the fight was later canceled due to an arm injury sustained by Berkhamov.

The year 2018 was a challenging period for Mukhamed Berkhamov, as he endured three consecutive injuries. Two of these injuries involved his left arm, preventing him from defending his ACA World Welterweight title against leading challengers Beslan Isaev and Albert Tumenov. The second injury stemmed partly from inadequate treatment of the first, requiring surgery to insert a stabilizing plate. Following the procedure, Berkhamov's arm gradually recovered, and he focused on light training sessions. During this period, he refrained from using his left hand and prioritized moderate-paced exercises to safeguard his health and prevent further setbacks. He also participated in amateur combat tournaments to keep himself in shape.

However, just as Berkhamov appeared poised for a comeback, tragedy struck with a third injury—a torn knee ligament. The severity of this injury, coupled with the prolonged recovery it required, ultimately forced Berkhamov to relinquish his ACA World Welterweight title.

On the other hand, Berkhamov held training camp at Fight Club Akhmat in preparation for his fight against fellow Kavkaz fighter Sharaf "Sherkhan" Davlatmurodov of Tajikstan.

Following his victory over Sharaf "Sherkhan" Davlatmurodov at ACB 55: Davlatmurodov vs. Berkhamov card, Berkhamov took a brief break to recover, only engaging in light training sessions just to maintain his fitness. After the three to four weeks resting period, Berkhamov then competed in the Don Cup for army hand-to-hand combat (ARB), winning first place in the 85-kilogram category.

In 2019, Mukhamed Berkhamov undertook a rigorous multi-stage training regimen in preparation for his fight against Brazilian fighter Ciro "Bad Boy" Rodrigues. The first stage of his preparation was a three-week training camp at the prestigious Allstars Training Center in Solna, Sweden. There, Berkhamov worked under the guidance of skilled coaches and trained with a roster of notable fighters, including Khamzat "Borz" Chimaev, Alexey Efremov, Frantz Slioa, Jonathan Westin, and several other top competitors. The camp provided a comprehensive platform for Berkhamov to sharpen his skills and enhance his overall performance.

Following his time in Sweden, Berkhamov transitioned to the second stage of preparation in Makhachkala, Dagestan, training at the Gorets Fight Club (Magomed Ankalaev gym) and other local gyms. This stage emphasized wrestling and sparring, allowing Berkhamov to refine his grappling techniques further in Dagestan.

However, as of right now, Berkhamov trains in Kill Cliff FC, where he was teammates with renowned fighters like Kamarudeen "The Nigerian Nightmare" Usman and Shavkat Rakhmonov.

During his early years at the Kill Cliff FC gym, Berkhamov chose not to accept payment for offering his services as a sparring partner. On one occasion, then-UFC Welterweight Champion Kamaru Usman offered to pay him during their sparring sessions. However, Berkhamov, unfamiliar with this practice and deeming it unnecessary, politely declined the offer, expressing that the opportunity to train alongside Welterweight legend Usman was rewarding enough in itself.

Nevertheless, back at Berhkhamov native town of Baksan, he trains Baksan Fighting Club/Team Alligator Nalchic under the leadership of fellow Circassian coach Beslan Zhamurzov.

Mukhamed Berkhamov, Ali "Hulk" Bagov, and Mukhamed Kokov are among the most estimable fighters to emerge from the Circassian community. These athletes not only represent their shared heritage but also frequently collaborate during training camps, using their combined expertise to sharpen each other's skills and realize enhanced outcomes in their respective careers.

== Championships and accomplishments ==
=== Pro MMA ===
💰 ACA Performance of the Night (Three times) vs. Stanislav Vlasenko, Jesse Taylor and Sharaf Davlatmurodov.

ACA Welterweight Champion (One time)

=== Soyuz MMA ===
🥇 FCF Absolute Cup Welterweight Tournament, Nalchik

🥇 Amateur MMA Cup of Nalchik Welterweight Championship, Nalchik

🥉 North Caucasus MMA Championship Bronze Medalist, Grozny

🥉 Russian Amateur MMA Championship Bronze Medalist, Volgograd

=== Combat Sambo ===
🥇 WCSF Combat Sambo International Tournament, Junior Category (Ages 15–17), Sochi, Russia

🥇 Tatarstan President's Sambo Cup, Kazan

=== Army Hand-to-Hand Combat ===
🏆 Don Cup Army Hand-to-Hand Combat Championship, Rostov-on-Don

=== Russian Grappling ===
🏆 Russian Open Grappling Cup, Novosibirsk

== Mixed martial arts record ==
Professional record breakdown
21 matches	18 wins	3 losses
By knockout	3	2
By submission	9	1
By decision	6	0

Res.	Record	Opponent	Method	Event	Date	Round	Time	Location	Notes
Win	18–3 (1)	Dante Schiro	Decision (unanimous)	Desert Force: Uncaged	October 30, 2026	3	5:00	Amman, Jordan	Catchweight (176 lb) bout.
Win	17–3 (1)	Jackson Loureiro	TKO (elbow and punches)	UAE Warriors 67	January 31, 2026	1	4:24	Abu Dhabi, United Arab Emirates	Catchweight (174 lb) bout.
Loss	16–3 (1)	Kendly St. Louis	Submission (rear-naked choke)	PFL 5 (2025)	June 12, 2025	3	3:21	Nashville, Tennessee, United States	
Loss	16–2 (1)	Thad Jean	KO (punches)	PFL 1 (2025)	April 3, 2025	1	4:25	Orlando, Florida, United States	2025 PFL Welterweight Tournament Quarterfinal.
Win	16–1 (1)	Ray Cooper III	Decision (split)	PFL 9 (2024)	August 23, 2024	3	5:00	Washington, D.C., United States	
Win	15–1 (1)	Herman Terrado	Decision (unanimous)	Bellator 300	October 7, 2023	3	5:00	San Jose, California, United States	Catchweight (180 lb) bout.
Loss	14–1 (1)	Lorenz Larkin	KO (elbow)	Bellator 290	February 4, 2023	1	1:41	Inglewood, California, United States	
NC	14–0 (1)	Lorenz Larkin	NC (illegal elbow)	Bellator 283	July 22, 2022	1	2:52	Tacoma, Washington, United States	Accidental illegal elbow rendered Berkhamov unable to continue.
Win	14–0	Jaleel Willis	Submission (guillotine choke)	Bellator 268	October 16, 2021	1	4:05	Phoenix, Arizona, United States	
Win	13–0	Ciro Rodrigues	Decision (unanimous)	ACA 97	August 31, 2019	3	5:00	Krasnodar, Russia	
Win	12–0	Brett Cooper	KO (punches)	ACB 67	August 19, 2017	2	0:32	Grozny, Russia	Won the ACB Welterweight Championship.
Win	11–0	Sharaf Davlatmurodov	Submission (armbar)	ACB 55	March 24, 2017	2	2:41	Dushanbe, Tajikistan	Performance of the Night.
Win	10–0	Jesse Taylor	Submission (armbar)	ACB 48	October 22, 2016	1	1:29	Moscow, Russia	Submission of the Night.
Win	9–0	Stanislav Vlasenko	KO (punch)	ACB 38	May 20, 2016	1	0:25	Rostov-on-Don, Russia	Catchweight (174 lb) bout. Knockout of the Night.
Win	8–0	Ronny Landaeta Utrera	Submission (armbar)	ACB 28	December 27, 2015	2	2:26	Nalchik, Russia	
Win	7–0	Yuri Izotov	Decision (unanimous)	Tech-Krep FC: Prime Selection 7	October 9, 2015	3	5:00	Krasnodar, Russia	Won the Tech-Krep FC Welterweight Tournament.
Win	6–0	Yuriy Kelekhsaev	Submission (triangle choke)	Tech-Krep FC: Prime Selection 6	August 20, 2015	1	3:15	Krasnodar, Russia	Tech-Krep FC Welterweight Tournament Semifinal.
Win	5–0	Salman Khaibulaev	Submission (brabo choke)	Tech-Krep FC: Prime Selection 2	June 25, 2015	1	1:54	Krasnodar, Russia	Tech-Krep FC Welterweight Tournament Quarterfinal.
Win	4–0	Nikolai Pryadko	Submission (rear-naked choke)	ACB 15	March 21, 2015	1	1:46	Nalchik, Russia	
Win	3–0	Tofiq Musayev	Submission (anaconda choke)	Oplot Challenge 94	November 30, 2013	1	4:09	Kharkov, Ukraine	
Win	2–0	Nver Kagramalyan	Submission (brabo choke)	Emperor FC 3	May 26, 2013	1	1:25	Yaroslavl, Russia	
Win	1–0	Artem Shokalo	Decision (unanimous)	Oplot Challenge 28	January 19, 2013	3	5:00	Kharkov, Ukraine	Welterweight debut.
