= 2020 in Bellator MMA =

Mixed martial arts events

Information
- Promotion: Bellator MMA
- First date aired: January 25, 2020
- Last date aired: December 10, 2020

2020 in Bellator MMA was the twelfth year in the history of Bellator MMA, a mixed martial arts promotion based in the United States. Bellator held 18 events in 2020.

== Background ==
Because of the COVID-19 pandemic in the United States, Bellator would go on hiatus after its 240th numbered event on February 22, 2020. The promotion would resume holding events with Bellator 242 on July 24.

On September 11, 2020, it was announced that Bellator telecasts would move to CBS Sports Network, starting October 1, after Viacom's re-merger with CBS Corporation in 2019. Prior to the announcement, CBS Sports Network debuted the recap series Bellator MMA: Recharged on April 25, 2020.

Bellator 248, which was held on October 10, would be the first MMA event to be held by a major promotion in France since the sport was legalized in January.

== Bellator Featherweight World Grand Prix Tournament ==
Opening round
(United States) A. J. McKee	KO
(Armenia) Georgi Karakhanyan	1
(United States) Derek Campos	UD
(United States) Daniel Straus	3
(United States) Darrion Caldwell	UD
(United States) Henry Corrales	3
(Hungary) Ádám Borics	TKO
(United States) Pat Curran	2
(Brazil) Patrício Pitbull (c)	UD
(United States) Juan Archuleta	5
(Portugal) Pedro Carvalho	SUB
(United States) Sam Sicilia	2
(United States) Emmanuel Sanchez	SUB
(United States) Tywan Claxton	2
(Germany) Daniel Weichel	UD
(United Kingdom) Saul Rogers	3

Quarterfinals
(United States) A. J. McKee	SUB
(United States) Derek Campos	3
(United States) Darrion Caldwell	SUB
(Hungary) Ádám Borics	1
(Brazil) Patrício Pitbull (c)	KO
(Portugal) Pedro Carvalho	1
(United States) Emmanuel Sanchez	UD
(Germany) Daniel Weichel	5

Semi-finals
(United States) A. J. McKee	SUB
(United States) Darrion Caldwell	1
(Brazil) Patrício Pitbull (c)	SUB
(United States) Emmanuel Sanchez	1

Final
(United States) A. J. McKee	SUB
(Brazil) Patrício Pitbull (c)	1

== Bellator 238 ==
Bellator 238: Budd vs. Cyborg
- Date: January 25, 2020
- Venue: The Forum
- City: Inglewood, California
- Attendance: 15,169
- Total gate: 1,725,989

Bellator 238: Budd vs. Cyborg took place on January 25, 2020 at The Forum in Inglewood, California. The event aired live on DAZN.

Background

The event featured a Bellator Women's Featherweight World Championship bout between the champion Julia Budd and former Strikeforce, Invicta, and UFC champion Cris Cyborg.

Results

Fight card
Weight class				Method	Round	Time	Notes
Women's Featherweight	Cris Cyborg	def.	Julia Budd (c)	TKO (punches)	4	1:14	(Note: For the Bellator Women's Featherweight World Championship.)
Featherweight	Darrion Caldwell	def.	Ádám Borics	Submission (rear-naked choke)	1	2:20	(Note: Bellator Featherweight World Grand Prix Quarter-Final bout.)
Featherweight	Juan Archuleta	def.	Henry Corrales	Decision (unanimous) (29-28, 29-28, 29-28)	3	5:00
Bantamweight	Sergio Pettis	def.	Alfred Khashakyan	Technical Submission (guillotine choke)	1	3:00
Welterweight	Raymond Daniels	def.	Jason King	TKO (punches)	1	3:07
Women's Strawweight	Emilee King	def.	Ava Knight	Submission (rear-naked choke)	1	2:18
Preliminary card
Catchweight (160 lb)	Joshua Jones	def.	Brandon Bender	Decision (unanimous) (30-26, 30-27, 29-27)	3	5:00
Featherweight	Aaron Pico	def.	Daniel Carey	KO (punch)	2	0:15
Featherweight	AJ Agazarm	def.	Adel Altamimi	Submission (triangle choke)	3	1:22
Featherweight	Jay Jay Wilson	def.	Mario Navarro	Submission (armbar)	2	2:48
Catchweight (180 lb)	Curtis Millender	def.	Moses Murrietta	Decision (unanimous) (30-27, 30-26, 30-26)	3	5:00
Lightweight	Anthony Taylor	def.	Chris Avila	Decision (majority) (28-28, 29-28, 29-28)	3	5:00
Welterweight	Miguel Jacob	def.	David Pacheco	Decision (unanimous) (30-27, 30-26, 30-27)	3	5:00
Postliminary card
Featherweight	Tony Bartovich	def.	Jarrett Connor	Decision (unanimous) (29-28, 29-28, 29-28)	3	5:00
Lightweight	Ricardo Seixas	def.	Dominic Clark	TKO (front kick and punches)	1	0:34

== Bellator 239 ==
Bellator 239: Ruth vs. Amosov
- Date: February 21, 2020
- Venue: WinStar World Casino
- City: Thackerville, Oklahoma
- Attendance: 1,031
- Total gate: $201,468

Bellator 239: Ruth vs. Amosov took place on February 21, 2020 at WinStar World Casino in Thackerville, Oklahoma.

The event aired live on Paramount Network and DAZN.

The event featured a welterweight bout between Ed Ruth and undefeated Yaroslav Amosov.

Results

Main card
Weight class				Method	Round	Time	Notes
Welterweight	Yaroslav Amosov	def.	Ed Ruth	Decision (unanimous) (29-28, 29-28, 29-28)	3	5:00
Lightweight	Myles Jury	def.	Brandon Girtz	Decision (unanimous) (29-28, 29-28, 29-28)	3	5:00
Heavyweight	Timothy Johnson	def.	Tyrell Fortune	KO (punch)	1	2:35
Heavyweight	Valentin Moldavsky	def.	Javy Ayala	Decision (unanimous) (30-25, 30-24, 30-24)	3	5:00
Preliminary card
Light Heavyweight	Grant Neal	def.	Claude Wilcox	TKO (punches)	3	3:37
Bantamweight	Josh Hill	def.	Vinicius Zani	Decision (unanimous) (30-27, 29-28, 29-28)	3	5:00
Featherweight	Solo Hatley	def.	Gaston Bolanos	Decision (split) (29-28, 28-29, 29-28)	3	5:00
Women's Flyweight	Denise Kielholtz	def.	Kristina Williams	Submission (rear-naked choke)	1	2:15
Featherweight	Teejay Britton	def.	Gabriel Varga	Decision (split) (29-28, 28-29, 29-28)	3	5:00
Bantamweight	Keith Lee	def.	Shawn Bunch	Decision (unanimous) (30-26, 29-28, 29-27)	3	5:00
Light Heavyweight	Christian Edwards	def.	Marco Hutchison	Decision (unanimous) (30-26, 30-26, 30-25)	3	5:00
Postliminary card
Heavyweight	Davion Franklin	def.	J.W. Kiser	TKO (punches)	1	1:40
Lightweight	Chris Gonzalez	def.	Aaron McKenzie	Decision (split) (30-27, 28-29, 30-27)	3	5:00
Featherweight	Kevin Croom	def.	Adil Benjilany	Decision (split) (29-28, 28-29, 29-28)	3	5:00
Featherweight	Cris Lencioni	def.	Salim Mukhidinov	Decision (split) (28-29, 29-28, 29-28)	3	5:00
Catchweight (175 lb)	Kyle Crutchmer	def.	Scott Futrell	Submission (anaconda choke)	1	2:58

== Bellator 240 ==
Bellator Dublin/Bellator 240
- Date: February 22, 2020
- Venue: 3Arena
- City: Dublin, Ireland

Bellator Dublin/Bellator 240 took place on February 22, 2020 at 3Arena in Dublin, Ireland.

Background

This was the first event of the second year of the Bellator European Series. The event was to be headlined by a bantamweight bout between James Gallagher and Cal Ellenor. However, on February 4, it was announced that Gallagher pulled out of the event due to a back injury, thus a women's featherweight bout between Leah McCourt and Judith Ruis was bumped to the main event.

The fights billed as Bellator 240 will be held on tape-delay on Paramount Network and DAZN and will feature a lightweight bout between former Bellator Lightweight World Champion Brent Primus and Peter Queally. However, Queally pulled out due to injury. Primus instead fought Chris Bungard.

Results

Bellator Dublin card
Weight class				Method	Round	Time	Notes
Women's Featherweight	Leah McCourt	def.	Judith Ruis	Decision (unanimous) (29-28, 29-28, 30-27)	3	5:00
Middleweight	Charlie Ward	def.	Kyle Kurtz	TKO (punches)	3	4:24
Welterweight	Austin Clem	def.	Aaron Chalmers	Decision (unanimous) (30-27, 30-27, 30-26)	3	5:00
Bellator 240 card
Lightweight	Brent Primus	def.	Chris Bungard	Submission (Neck crank)	1	1:55
Catchweight (160 lb)	Kiefer Crosbie	def.	Iamik Furtado	Decision (split) (29-28, 28-29, 29-28)	3	5:00
Women's Flyweight	Bec Rawlings	def.	Elina Kallionidou	Decision (unanimous) (30-27, 30-27, 29-28)	3	5:00
Featherweight	Ricky Bandejas	def.	Frans Mlambo	KO (punches)	2	1:25
Welterweight	Oliver Enkamp	def.	Lewis Long	KO (spinning back fist)	1	4:10
Preliminary card
Catchweight (180 lb)	George Hardwick	def.	Richard Kiely	Submission (guillotine choke)	2	3:40
Lightweight	Georgi Karakhanyan	def.	Paul Redmond	Submission (guillotine choke)	2	0:42
Women's Strawweight	Danni Neilan	def.	Chiara Penco	Decision (unanimous) (30-27, 30-27, 29-28)	3	5:00
Featherweight	Alberth Dias	def.	Richie Smullen	Decision (split) (29-28, 28-29, 29-28)	3	5:00
Middleweight	Will Fleury	def.	Justin Moore	Submission (arm-triangle choke)	1	4:14
Lightweight	Christopher Duncan	def.	Mateusz Piskorz	TKO (punches)	2	2:43
Featherweight	Calum Murrie	def.	Dylan Logan	Submission (rear-naked choke)	1	4:02
Flyweight	Blaine O'Driscoll	def.	Ezzoubair Bouarsa	TKO (punches)	1	4:12
Featherweight	Ciaran Clarke	def.	Jamie Faulding	Decision (unanimous) (30-26, 30-26, 29-27)	3	5:00
Lightweight	Constantin Blanita	def.	Asael Adjoudj	Decision (split) (29-28, 28-29, 29-28)	3	5:00
Postliminary card
Featherweight	Ilias Bulaid	def.	Diego Freitas	Decision (unanimous) (30-27, 30-27, 30-27)	3	5:00

== Bellator 241 (Cancelled) ==
Bellator 241: Pitbull vs. Carvalho
- Date: March 13, 2020 (cancelled)
- Venue: Mohegan Sun Casino
- City: Uncasville, Connecticut

Bellator 241: Pitbull vs. Carvalho was a scheduled event to take place on March 13, 2020 at Mohegan Sun Casino in Uncasville, Connecticut. The event was scheduled to be live on DAZN.

Background

The event was expected to feature a Bellator Featherweight World Championship bout between the champion Patrício Freire and Pedro Carvalho.

A heavyweight between former UFC Heavyweight Champion Josh Barnett and Ronny Markes was expected for the event. The original meeting was scheduled for Bellator 235, but Barnett was pulled out an hour before the fight due to illness and the fight was rebooked for this event. Reports came out stating that Barnett was pulled due to a failed drug test, but Mike Mazzulli, head of the Mohegan Tribe Athletic Department, announced that the reports were false. However on March 4, it was announced that Barnett was officially off the card, which Mazzulli announced that a failed medical test was the reason for Barnett's removal and Bellator then announced that Matt Mitrione would replace Barnett against Markes.

On March 13, the day of the event, Bellator President Scott Coker announced that the event would be cancelled due to the COVID-19 pandemic in the United States.

Cancelled Fight card

Fight card
Weight class				Method	Round	Time	Notes
Featherweight	Patrício Freire (c)	vs.	Pedro Carvalho				(Note: Bellator Featherweight World Grand Prix Quarter-Final bout for the Bellator Featherweight World Championship.)
Featherweight	Daniel Weichel	vs.	Emmanuel Sanchez				(Note: Bellator Featherweight World Grand Prix Quarter-Final bout.)
Heavyweight	Matt Mitrione	vs.	Ronny Markes
Welterweight	Paul Daley	vs.	Sabah Homasi
Lightweight	Nick Newell	vs.	Zachary Zane
Middleweight	Anatoly Tokov	vs.	Fabio Aguiar
Preliminary card
Middleweight	Jordan Newman	vs.	Pat McCrohan
Welterweight	Ion Pascu	vs.	Mark Lemminger
Women's Featherweight	Leslie Smith	vs.	Jessy Miele
Lightweight	Killys Mota	vs.	Nathaniel Andrews
Lightweight	Vladimir Tokov	vs.	Marcus Surin
Middleweight	Romero Cotton	vs.	Justin Sumter
Catchweight (160 lb)	Kevin Ferguson Jr.	vs.	Kaheem Murray
Welterweight	Robson Gracie Jr.	vs.	Billy Goff

== Bellator 242 (Cancelled) ==
Bellator 242: Bader vs. Nemkov
- Date: May 9, 2020 (cancelled)
- Venue: SAP Center
- City: San Jose, California

Bellator 242: Bader vs. Nemkov was a scheduled event to take place on May 9, 2020 at SAP Center in San Jose, California. The event was scheduled to be live on Paramount Network and DAZN.

Background

The event was expected to feature a Bellator Light Heavyweight World Championship bout between the champion Ryan Bader and Vadim Nemkov.

On March 30, Bellator announced that the event would be cancelled due to the COVID-19 pandemic in the United States.

Cancelled Fight card

Fight card
Weight class				Method	Round	Time	Notes
Light Heavyweight	Ryan Bader (c)	vs.	Vadim Nemkov				(Note: Bellator Light Heavyweight World Championship.)
Middleweight	Gegard Mousasi	vs.	Douglas Lima				(Note: Bellator Middleweight World Championship.)

== Bellator London 3 (Cancelled) ==
Bellator London: Gallagher vs. Ellenor
- Date: May 16, 2020 (cancelled)
- Venue: SSE Arena
- City: London, England

Bellator London: Gallagher vs. Ellenor was a scheduled event to take place on May 16, 2020 at SSE Arena in London, England as part of the Bellator European Fight Series. The event was scheduled to be live on Channel 5.

Background

The event was expected to feature a bantamweight bout between rivals James Gallagher and Cal Ellenor.

On March 30, Bellator announced that the event would be cancelled due to the COVID-19 pandemic in the United Kingdom.

Cancelled Fight card

Fight card
Weight class				Method	Round	Time	Notes
Bantamweight	James Gallagher	vs.	Cal Ellenor

== Bellator 243 (Cancelled) ==
Bellator 243: Carmouche vs. Bohm
- Date: May 29, 2020 (cancelled)
- Venue: Pechanga Resort and Casino
- City: Temecula, California

Bellator 243: Carmouche vs. Bohm was a scheduled event to take place on May 29, 2020 at Pechanga Resort and Casino in Temecula, California. The event was scheduled to be live on Paramount Network and DAZN.

Background

The event was expected to feature a women's flyweight bout between former UFC title contender Liz Carmouche and Mandy Bohm.

On March 30, Bellator announced that the event would be cancelled due to the COVID-19 pandemic in the United States.

Cancelled Fight card

Fight card
Weight class				Method	Round	Time	Notes
Women's Flyweight	Liz Carmouche	vs.	Mandy Bohm

== Bellator 244 (Cancelled) ==
Bellator 244: Chandler vs. Henderson 2
- Date: June 6, 2020 (cancelled)
- Venue: Wintrust Arena
- City: Chicago, Illinois

Bellator 244: Chandler vs. Henderson 2 was a scheduled event to take place on June 6, 2020 at Wintrust Arena in Chicago, Illinois. The event was scheduled to be live on DAZN.

Background

The event was expected to feature a rematch between former Bellator world champion Michael Chandler and former UFC and WEC world champion Benson Henderson, with Chandler having won the first bout.

Additionally, a semi-final matchup in the Bellator Featherweight World Grand Prix between former bantamweight champ Darrion Caldwell and A.J. McKee was scheduled for the card.

On April 21, Bellator announced that the event would be cancelled due to the COVID-19 pandemic in the United States.

Cancelled Fight card

Fight card
Weight class				Method	Round	Time	Notes
Lightweight	Michael Chandler	vs.	Benson Henderson
Featherweight	Darrion Caldwell	vs.	A.J. McKee				(Note: Bellator Featherweight World Grand Prix Semi-Final bout.)

== Bellator 242 ==
Bellator 242: Bandejas vs. Pettis
- Date: July 24, 2020
- Venue: Mohegan Sun Arena
- City: Uncasville, Connecticut
- Attendance: None (behind closed doors)

Bellator 242: Bandejas vs. Pettis took place on July 24, 2020 at the Mohegan Sun Arena in Uncasville, Connecticut.

The event aired live on Paramount Network and DAZN.

Bellator 242 marked the organization's return to live events following a shutdown due to the COVID-19 pandemic and was held behind closed doors without fans in attendance.

Results

Main card
Weight class				Method	Round	Time	Notes
Bantamweight	Sergio Pettis	def.	Ricky Bandejas	Decision (unanimous) (30-27, 30-27, 30-27)	3	5:00
Welterweight	Jason Jackson	def.	Jordan Mein	Decision (unanimous) (30-27, 30-27, 30-27)	3	5:00
Featherweight	Jay Jay Wilson	def.	Tywan Claxton	Decision (split) (27-30, 29-28, 30-27)	3	5:00
Featherweight	Aaron Pico	def.	Solo Hatley Jr.	Submission (rear-naked choke)	1	2:10
Preliminary card
Welterweight	Mark Lemminger	def.	Jake Smith	TKO (punches)	2	4:46
Bantamweight	Raufeon Stots	def.	Cass Bell	Submission (rear-naked choke)	3	1:24
Heavyweight	Ras Hylton	def.	Rudy Schaffroth	Decision (unanimous) (29-28, 29-28, 29-28)	3	5:00

== Bellator 243 ==
Bellator 243: Chandler vs. Henderson 2
- Date: August 7, 2020
- Venue: Mohegan Sun Arena
- City: Uncasville, Connecticut

Chandler vs. Henderson 2 was initially scheduled to take place at Bellator 244 on June 6, 2020 at Wintrust Arena in Chicago, Illinois. However, the event was postponed due to the COVID-19 pandemic. It was announced that the bout was rescheduled as the main event of Bellator 243 set to take place on August 7 from the Mohegan Sun Arena in Uncasville, Connecticut.

The event aired live on Paramount Network and DAZN.

Background

The event featured a lightweight rematch between former three-time Bellator lightweight champion Michael Chandler and former WEC and UFC lightweight champion Benson Henderson. To set up for Bellator Lightweight Title contention.

Results

Main card
Weight class				Method	Round	Time	Notes
Lightweight	Michael Chandler	def.	Benson Henderson	KO (punches)	1	2:09
Heavyweight	Timothy Johnson	def.	Matt Mitrione	TKO (punches)	1	3:14
Lightweight	Myles Jury	def.	Georgi Karakhanyan	Decision (split) (27-30, 30-27, 29-28)	3	5:00
Catchweight (175 lb)	Sabah Homasi	def.	Curtis Millender	Decision (unanimous) (29-28, 29-28, 29-28)	3	5:00
Preliminary card
Catchweight (150 lb)	Ádám Borics	def.	Mike Hamel	Decision (split) (29-28, 28-29, 29-28)	3	5:00
Featherweight	Cris Lencioni	def.	AJ Agazarm	Decision (unanimous) (30-26, 30-27, 29-28)	3	5:00
Women's Flyweight	Valerie Loureda	def.	Tara Graff	TKO (punches)	2	5:00
Light Heavyweight	Grant Neal	def.	Hamza Salim	Decision (unanimous) (30-26, 30-27, 30-24)	3	5:00
Lightweight	Charlie Campbell	def.	Nainoa Dung	TKO (leg kicks)	2	1:42
Middleweight	Dalton Rosta	def.	Mark Gardner	TKO (doctor stoppage)	1	5:00

== Bellator 244 ==
Bellator 244: Bader vs. Nemkov
- Date: August 21, 2020
- Venue: Mohegan Sun Arena
- City: Uncasville, Connecticut

Bader vs. Nemkov was initially scheduled to take place at Bellator 242 on May 9, 2020 at SAP Center in San Jose, California. However, the event was postponed due to the COVID-19 pandemic. It was announced that the bout was rescheduled as the main event for Bellator 244 set to take place on August 21 from the Mohegan Sun Arena in Uncasville, Connecticut.

The event aired live on Paramount Network and DAZN.

Background

The event featured a men's light heavyweight championship match between the current two-division champion Ryan Bader and the number one contender Vadim Nemkov.

Results

Main card
Weight class				Method	Round	Time	Notes
Light Heavyweight	Vadim Nemkov	def.	Ryan Bader (c)	TKO (head kick and punches)	2	3:02	(Note: For the Bellator Light Heavyweight World Championship.)
Featherweight	Julia Budd	def.	Jessy Miele	Decision (unanimous) (30-26, 30-27, 30-27)	3	5:00
Heavyweight	Valentin Moldavsky	def.	Roy Nelson	Decision (unanimous) (30-27, 30-27, 30-27)	3	5:00
Middleweight	John Salter	def.	Andrew Kapel	Submission (arm-triangle choke)	3	3:11
Preliminary card
Catchweight (175 lb)	Yaroslav Amosov	def.	Mark Lemminger	TKO (doctor stoppage)	1	5:00
Lightweight	Sidney Outlaw	def.	Adam Piccolotti	Decision (split) (28-29, 29-28, 29-28)	3	5:00
Bantamweight	Josh Hill	def.	Erik Pérez	Decision (unanimous) (29-28, 30-27, 30-27)	3	5:00
Catchweight (147 lb)	Weber Almeida	def.	Salim Mukhidinov	TKO (punches)	1	3:57
Catchweight (150 lb)	John de Jesus	def.	Vladyslav Parubchenko	Decision (unanimous) (29-28, 30-27, 29-28)	3	5:00
Lightweight	Chris Gonzalez	def.	Vladimir Tokov	Decision (split) (28-29, 29-28, 30-27)	3	5:00
Featherweight	Lucas Brennan	def.	Will Smith	TKO (punches)	2	4:14

== Bellator 245 ==
Bellator 245: Davis vs. Machida II
- Date: September 11, 2020
- Venue: Mohegan Sun Arena
- City: Uncasville, Connecticut

Bellator 245: Davis vs. Machida II took place on September 11, 2020 at Mohegan Sun Arena in Uncasville, Connecticut.

Background

The event featured a light heavyweight bout between former Bellator Light Heavyweight World Champion Phil Davis and former UFC Light Heavyweight Champion Lyoto Machida. The two previously met at UFC 163 where Davis won by a controversial split decision.

Results

Main card
Weight class				Method	Round	Time	Notes
Light Heavyweight	Phil Davis	def.	Lyoto Machida	Decision (split) (28-29, 29-28, 29-28)	3	5:00
Featherweight	Cat Zingano	def.	Gabby Holloway	Decision (unanimous) (29-27, 30-26, 30-26)	3	5:00
Middleweight	Taylor Johnson	def.	Ed Ruth	Submission (inverted heel hook)	1	0:59
Welterweight	Raymond Daniels	vs.	Peter Stanonik	No Contest (accidental groin kick)	2	1:00
Preliminary card
Light Heavyweight	Alex Polizzi	def.	Rafael Carvalho	Decision (unanimous) (30-27, 30-27, 30-27)	3	5:00
Featherweight	Leslie Smith	def.	Amanda Bell	Decision (unanimous) (29-28, 29-28, 29-28)	3	5:00
Heavyweight	Tyrell Fortune	vs.	Jack May	No Contest (accidental groin strike)	1	2:42
Catchweight (144 lb)	Keith Lee	def.	Vinicius Zani	Decision (unanimous) (30-27, 29-28, 29-28)	3	5:00

== Bellator 246 ==
Bellator 246: Archuleta vs. Mix
- Date: September 12, 2020
- Venue: Mohegan Sun Arena
- City: Uncasville, Connecticut

Bellator 246: Archuleta vs. Mix took place on September 12, 2020 at Mohegan Sun Arena in Uncasville, Connecticut.

Background

The event featured a bout for the vacant Bellator Bantamweight World Championship between former featherweight title challenger Juan Archuleta and Patchy Mix.

At the weigh-ins, DeAnna Bennett and Keoni Diggs both missed weight for their respective bouts. Bennett weighed in at 131.7 pounds, 5.7 pounds over the non-title flyweight limit of 126.0 pounds, and Diggs weighed in at 157 pounds, 1 pound over the non-title lightweight limit of 156 pounds. Both bouts proceeded at catchweights and both fighters were fined a percentage of their respective purses, a percentage that went to their opponents.

This would be the last Bellator event to air on Paramount Network.

Results

Main card
Weight class				Method	Round	Time	Notes
Bantamweight	Juan Archuleta	def.	Patchy Mix	Decision (unanimous) (49-46, 48-47, 48-47)	5	5:00	(Note: For the vacant Bellator Bantamweight World Championship.)
Welterweight	Neiman Gracie	def.	Jon Fitch	Submission (heel hook)	2	4:47
Catchweight (131.7 lb)	Liz Carmouche	def.	DeAnna Bennett	Submission (rear-naked choke)	3	3:17
Catchweight (157 lb)	Keoni Diggs	def.	Derek Campos	Technical Submission (rear-naked choke)	3	4:59
Preliminary card
Middleweight	Daniel Madrid	def.	Pat Casey	Decision (split) (28-29, 30-27, 29-28)	3	5:00
Middleweight	Ty Gwerder	def.	Tuco Tokkos	TKO (punch and knee)	3	1:05
Heavyweight	Davion Franklin	def.	Ras Hylton	Technical Decision (unanimous) (30-27, 30-27, 30-27)	3	1:37	(Note: Franklin landed a punch to the back of the head and Hylton was unable to continue.)

== Bellator Milan 2 ==
Bellator Milan: Edwards vs. van Steenis
- Date: September 26, 2020
- Venue: Allianz Cloud
- City: Milan, Italy

Bellator Milan: Edwards vs. van Steenis was a mixed martial arts event scheduled for September 26, 2020 from Milan, Italy and marked the organization's eighth European Series event.

The event aired on Channel 5 in the United Kingdom and featured a middleweight bout between Fabian Edwards and Costello van Steenis.

Results

Fight card
Weight class				Method	Round	Time	Notes
Middleweight	Costello van Steenis	def.	Fabian Edwards	Decision (split) (28-29, 28-27, 29-28)	3	5:00
Middleweight	Michael Shipman	def.	Pietro Penini	Decision (unanimous) (30-27, 30-27, 30-27)	3	5:00
Middleweight	Will Fleury	def.	Kent Kauppinen	Decision (unanimous) (30-27, 30-27, 30-27)	3	5:00
Preliminary card
Lightweight	George Hardwick	def.	Nicolò Solli	Decision (unanimous) (30-27, 30-27, 30-27)	3	5:00
Welterweight	Ion Pascu	def.	Stefano Paterno	Decision (unanimous) (29-28, 30-27, 30-27)	3	5:00
Lightweight	Alfie Davis	def.	Akonne Wanliss	Decision (unanimous) (30-26, 30-27, 30-27)	3	5:00
Lightweight	Daniel Scatizzi	def.	Gavin Hughes	Submission (guillotine choke)	1	1:41
Featherweight	Adien Lee	def.	Jeremy Petley	KO (knee)	2	1:22
Bantamweight	Frans Mlambo	def.	Corey Tait	Decision (unanimous) (30-27, 29-28, 29-27)	3	5:00
Light Heavyweight	Luke Trainer	def.	Alex O'Toole	TKO (punches)	1	1:22
Featherweight	Richie Smullen	def.	Harry Hardwick	Decision (unanimous) (29-28, 29-28, 29-28)	3	5:00
Women's Strawweight	Chiara Penco	def.	Aleksandra Plamenova	TKO (elbows)	2	4:27
Women's Strawweight	Danni McCormack	def.	Claire Lopez	Submission (rear-naked choke)	2	3:45

== Bellator 247 ==
Bellator 247: Jackson vs. Kielholtz
- Date: October 1, 2020
- Venue: Allianz Cloud
- City: Milan, Italy

Bellator 247: Jackson vs. Kielholtz was a mixed martial arts event held on October 1, 2020 from Milan, Italy.

Background

This was the first Bellator MMA event to air on CBS Sports Network.

The event was expected to feature a welterweight bout between Paul Daley and Derek Anderson. The day of the weigh-ins, Daley notified Bellator officials that he would not make weight. Daley weighed in anyway, 2.5 pounds over the welterweight weight limit of 171 lb. Daley was hospitalized and Bellator announced that the bout was canceled. The women's flyweight bout between Kate Jackson and Denise Kielholtz was bumped to the main event.

Results

Main card
Weight class				Method	Round	Time	Notes
Women's Flyweight	Denise Kielholtz	def.	Kate Jackson	KO (punches)	1	0:43
Middleweight	Norbert Növényi Jr.	def.	Laid Zerhouni	Submission (triangle choke)	1	4:36
Featherweight	Brian Moore	def.	Simone D'Anna	KO (punch)	2	3:55
Catchweight (160 lb)	Christopher Duncan	def.	Iamik Furtado	TKO (punches)	2	3:58
Preliminary card
Welterweight	Lewis Long	def.	Giovanni Melillo	Submission (kneebar)	1	2:24
Women's Flyweight	Mandy Böhm	def.	Griet Eeckhout	Decision (unanimous) (30-27, 30-27, 30-26)	3	5:00
Welterweight	Uros Jurisic	def.	Walter Gahadza	Submission (rear-naked choke)	1	3:07
Welterweight	Constantin Gnusariev	def.	Kywan Gracie	Decision (unanimous) (30-27, 29-28, 29-28)	3	5:00
Light Heavyweight	Lee Chadwick	def.	Ederson Macedo	Submission (arm-triangle choke)	2	3:28
Flyweight	Blaine O'Driscoll	def.	Salah Elkas	Submission (rear-naked choke)	1	2:26
Women's Atomweight	Monika Chochlíková	def.	Jade Jorand	Submission (scorpion crunch)	2	3:50

== Bellator Dublin 3 (Cancelled) ==
Bellator Dublin: Queally vs. Pitbull
- Date: October 3, 2020
- Venue: 3Arena
- City: Dublin, Ireland

Bellator Dublin: Queally vs. Pitbull was supposed to take place on October 3, 2020 at 3Arena in Dublin, Ireland.

The event was cancelled by Bellator as they announced an event for October 1.

Background

The event was supposed feature a lightweight bout between Peter Queally and Patricky Freire.

Cancelled Fight card

Main card
Weight class				Method	Round	Time	Notes
Lightweight	Peter Queally	vs.	Patricky Freire

== Bellator Milan 3 ==
Bellator Milan: Gallagher vs. Ellenor
- Date: October 3, 2020
- Venue: Allianz Cloud
- City: Milan, Italy

Bellator Milan: Gallagher vs. Ellenor took place on October 3, 2020 at Allianz Cloud in Milan, Italy as the ninth event in the Bellator European Series. The event will be live on Channel 5 in the UK.

Background

The event featured a bantamweight bout between rivals James Gallagher and Cal Ellenor.

Results

Fight card
Weight class				Method	Round	Time	Notes
Bantamweight	James Gallagher	def.	Cal Ellenor	Submission (rear-naked choke)	1	4:31
Middleweight	Charlie Ward	def.	Andy Monzolo	Decision (unanimous) (29-28, 29-28, 29-28)	3	5:00
Catchweight (160 lb)	Charlie Leary	def.	Kiefer Crosbie	TKO (doctor stoppage)	1	5:00
Preliminary card
Women's Featherweight	Sinead Kavanagh	def.	Katharina Lehner	Decision (unanimous) (29-28, 29-28, 29-28)	3	5:00
Lightweight	Aymard Guih	def.	Chris Bungard	Decision (split) (28-29, 29-28, 30-27)	3	5:00
Welterweight	Acoidan Duque	def.	Carlo Pedersoli	Decision (unanimous) (29-27, 30-27, 30-27)	3	5:00
Heavyweight	Gokhan Sharicam	def.	Joffie Houlton	TKO (punches)	1	2:52
Featherweight	Andrew Fisher	def.	Ashleigh Grimshaw	Decision (unanimous) (29-28, 29-28, 29-28)	3	5:00
Lightweight	Kane Mousah	def.	Alessandro Botti	Decision (split) (27-30, 29-28, 29-28)	3	5:00
Featherweight	Asael Adjoudj	def.	Nathaniel Jessimer	TKO (elbows)	2	2:58
Welterweight	Marek Jakimowicz	def.	Curtis Dodge	TKO (elbows)	1	4:45

== Bellator 248 ==
Bellator Paris/Bellator 248
- Date: October 10, 2020
- Venue: AccorHotels Arena
- City: Paris, France

Bellator Paris/Bellator 248 was a mixed martial arts event scheduled for October 10, 2020 from Paris, France. It was the first major MMA event held in France since the sport was legalized back in January.

Background

This was the first event where a leading MMA organization held a live event in front of a paying audience in France. One thousand tickets were made available and were all sold out within 48 hours.

The Bellator Paris portion of the card aired on Channel 5 and featured a heavyweight bout between former title challenger Cheick Kongo and Timothy Johnson. The two previously met at Bellator 208 where Kongo won by knockout the first round.

The Bellator 248 portion of the card aired on CBS Sports Network and featured a welterweight bout between Michael Page and former Cage Warriors Welterweight Champion Ross Houston. The bout was later updated to a 175-pound catchweight contest.

Results

Bellator Paris card
Weight class				Method	Round	Time	Notes
Heavyweight	Timothy Johnson	def.	Cheick Kongo	Decision (split) (28-29, 29-28, 29-28)	3	5:00
Featherweight	Saul Rogers	def.	Arbi Mezhidov	Submission (rear-naked choke)	1	4:38
Bellator Paris Prelims
Lightweight	Yves Landu	def.	Terry Brazier	KO (flying knee)	1	2:18
Featherweight	Fabacary Diatta	def.	Dominique Wooding	Decision (unanimous) (29-28, 29-28, 30-27)	3	5:00
Women's Flyweight	Lucie Bertaud	def.	Maguy Berchel	Decision (unanimous) (29-28, 30-26, 30-26)	3	5:00
Featherweight	Ciran Clarke	def.	Jean N'Doye	Decision (unanimous) (30-26, 30-27, 30-27)	3	5:00
Bellator 248 card
Catchweight (175 lb)	Michael Page	def.	Ross Houston	Decision (unanimous) (29-28, 30-27, 30-27)	3	5:00
Welterweight	Oliver Enkamp	def.	Emmanuel Dawa	Submission (japanese necktie)	1	4:10
Catchweight (160 lb)	Alan Omer	def.	Ryan Scope	TKO (punches)	1	1:46
Featherweight	Mads Burnell	def.	Darko Banovic	TKO (punches)	1	3:13

== Bellator 249 ==
Bellator 249: Cyborg vs. Blencowe
- Date: October 15, 2020
- Venue: Mohegan Sun Arena
- City: Uncasville, Connecticut

Bellator 249: Cyborg vs. Blencowe was a mixed martial arts event held on October 15, 2020 at the Mohegan Sun Arena in Uncasville, Connecticut. This event aired live on CBS Sports Network.

Background

The event featured a Bellator Women's Featherweight World Championship bout between the champion Cris Cyborg and former title challenger Arlene Blencowe.

A middleweight prelim bout between Curtis Millender and Joe Schilling was canceled after it was revealed by Schilling that one of his cornermen tested positive for COVID-19.

A catchweight bout between Patricky Freire and Jeleel Willis was scheduled to be the co-main event of the event. However, the bout was removed from the card when the Mohegan Tribal Athletic Commission deemed Freire unable to compete due to what was termed an undisclosed medical issue.

Results

Main card
Weight class				Method	Round	Time	Notes
Women's Featherweight	Cris Cyborg (c)	def.	Arlene Blencowe	Submission (rear-naked choke)	2	2:36	(Note: For the Bellator Women's Featherweight World Championship.)
Catchweight (139 lb)	Leandro Higo	def.	Ricky Bandejas	Submission (rear-naked choke)	2	2:32
Heavyweight	Steve Mowry	def.	Shawn Teed	TKO (knee and punches)	1	4:22
Lightweight	Saad Awad	vs.	Mandel Nallo	No Contest (accidental groin strike)	1	1:44
Preliminary card
Middleweight	Andrew Kapel	def.	Joseph Creer	TKO (doctor stoppage)	2	5:00
Welterweight	Kemran Lachinov	def.	Kyle Crutchmer	Decision (unanimous) (29-28, 29-28, 29-28)	3	5:00
Light Heavyweight	Christian Edwards	def.	Hamza Salim	Submission (rear-naked choke)	2	1:28
Catchweight (140 lb)	Da'Mon Blackshear	def.	Mike Kimbel	Submission (rear-naked choke)	2	4:14
Welterweight	Aviv Gozali	def.	Logan Neal	Submission (kimura)	1	3:22
Welterweight	Albert Gonzales	def.	Kastriot Xhema	TKO (retirement)	2	5:00

== Bellator 250 ==
Bellator 250: Mousasi vs. Lima
- Date: October 29, 2020
- Venue: Mohegan Sun Arena
- City: Uncasville, Connecticut

Bellator 250: Mousasi vs. Lima was a mixed martial arts event held on October 29, 2020 at the Mohegan Sun Arena in Uncasville, Connecticut. This event aired live on CBS Sports Network.

Background

The event featured a bout for the vacant Bellator Middleweight World Championship between current Bellator Welterweight World Champion Douglas Lima and former Bellator middleweight world champion Gegard Mousasi.

Nick Newell was scheduled to face Zachary Zane in a lightweight bout and Veta Arteaga was scheduled to Desiree Yanez in a women's flyweight bout. However, both bouts where cancelled when Newell and Arteaga tested positive for COVID-19.

Results

Main card
Weight class				Method	Round	Time	Notes
Middleweight	Gegard Mousasi	def.	Douglas Lima	Decision (unanimous) (48–47, 49–46, 49–46)	5	5:00	(Note: For the vacant Bellator Middleweight World Championship.)
Featherweight	Henry Corrales	def.	Brandon Girtz	Decision (split) (30–27, 27–30, 30–27)	3	5:00
Middleweight	Dalton Rosta	def.	Ty Gwerder	Decision (unanimous) (30–27, 30–27, 30–27)	3	5:00
Preliminary card
Heavyweight	Jake Hager	def.	Brandon Calton	Decision (split) (29–28, 28–29, 29–28)	3	5:00
Welterweight	Sabah Homasi	def.	Bobby Voelker	KO (flying knee and punches)	2	0:20
Middleweight	Johnny Eblen	def.	Taylor Johnson	Decision (unanimous) (29–28, 30–27, 30–27)	3	5:00
Catchweight (150 lb.)	Ádám Borics	def.	Erick Sanchez	Decision (unanimous) (29–28, 30–27, 30–27)	3	5:00
Featherweight	Cody Law	def.	Orlando Ortega	Submission (D'Arce choke)	1	2:41

== Bellator 251 ==
Bellator 251: Manhoef vs. Anderson
- Date: November 5, 2020
- Venue: Mohegan Sun Arena
- City: Uncasville, Connecticut

Bellator 251: Manhoef vs. Anderson was a mixed martial arts event that took place on November 5, 2020 from the Mohegan Sun Arena in Uncasville, Connecticut. This event aired live on CBS Sports Network.

Background

The event featured a light heavyweight main event between Melvin Manhoef and UFC veteran Corey Anderson.

Results

Main card
Weight class				Method	Round	Time	Notes
Light Heavyweight	Corey Anderson	def.	Melvin Manhoef	TKO (elbows and punches)	2	2:34
Heavyweight	Tyrell Fortune	def.	Said Sowma	Decision (unanimous) (29-28, 29-28, 29-28)	3	5:00
Middleweight	Austin Vanderford	def.	Vinicius de Jesus	Decision (unanimous) (30-26, 30-27, 30-27)	3	5:00
Welterweight	Derek Anderson	def.	Killys Mota	TKO (head kick)	2	4:27
Preliminary card
Lightweight	Georgi Karakhanyan	def.	Bryce Logan	Decision (split) (28-29, 29-28, 29-28)	3	5:00
Light Heavyweight	Julius Anglickas	def.	Alex Polizzi	Decision (unanimous) (30-27, 30-27, 30-27)	3	5:00
Women's Featherweight	Janay Harding	def.	Jessy Miele	Decision (unanimous) (30-27, 30-27, 30-27)	3	5:0
Lightweight	Ali Zebian	def.	Piankhi Zimmerman	Decision (unanimous) (29-28, 30-27, 30-27)	3	5:00
Bantamweight	Jaylon Bates	def.	Joe Supino	Decision (unanimous) (30-25, 30-27, 30-27)	3	5:00
Women's Strawweight	Sumiko Inaba	def.	Jessica Ruiz	TKO (elbows)	1	4:59

== Bellator 252 ==
Bellator 252: Pitbull vs. Carvalho
- Date: November 12, 2020
- Venue: Mohegan Sun Arena
- City: Uncasville, Connecticut

Bellator 252: Pitbull vs. Carvalho was a mixed martial arts event held on November 12, 2020 from the Mohegan Sun Arena in Uncasville, Connecticut. This event aired live on CBS Sports Network.

Background

The event featured a Bellator Featherweight World Grand Prix Quarter-Final bout for the Bellator Featherweight World Championship between the champion Patricio Freire and Pedro Carvalho. The bout was originally booked for Bellator 241, but the event was cancelled due to the COVID-19 pandemic.

Results

Main card
Weight class				Method	Round	Time	Notes
Featherweight	Patricio Freire (c)	def.	Pedro Carvalho	KO (punch)	1	2:10	(Note: Bellator Featherweight World Grand Prix Quarter-Final bout for the Bellator Featherweight World Championship.)
Welterweight	Yaroslav Amosov	def.	Logan Storley	Decision (split) (29-28, 28-29, 29-28)	3	5:00
Featherweight	Emmanuel Sanchez	def.	Daniel Weichel	Decision (unanimous) (48-46, 49-46, 49-45)	5	5:00	(Note: Bellator Featherweight World Grand Prix Quarter-Final bout.)
Preliminary card
Featherweight	Aaron Pico	def.	John de Jesus	KO (punch)	2	4:12
Women's Strawweight	Keri Taylor-Melendez	def.	Emilee King	Submission (rear-naked choke)	1	3:02
Lightweight	Manny Muro	def.	Devin Powell	Decision (unanimous) (30–27, 29–28, 30–27)	3	5:00
Bantamweight	Jornel Lugo	def.	Schyler Sootho	Decision (unanimous) (29–28, 30–27, 30–27)	3	5:00
Catchweight (148 lb)	Lucas Brennan	def.	Andrew Salas	Decision (unanimous) (30–27, 30–26, 30–26)	3	5:00	(Note: Brennan missed weight.)
Welterweight	Roman Faraldo	def.	Pat Casey	KO (flying knee)	2	2:30
Welterweight	Trevor Gudde	def.	Khonry Gracie	TKO (knee and punches)	3	3:28

== Bellator 253 ==
Bellator 253: Caldwell vs. McKee
- Date: November 19, 2020
- Venue: Mohegan Sun Arena
- City: Uncasville, Connecticut

Bellator 253: Caldwell vs. McKee was a mixed martial arts event scheduled for November 19, 2020 from the Mohegan Sun Arena in Uncasville, Connecticut. This event aired live on CBS Sports Network.

Background

The event featured a Bellator Featherweight World Grand Prix Semi-Final bout between Darrion Caldwell and A. J. McKee.

Results

Main card
Weight class				Method	Round	Time	Notes
Featherweight	A. J. McKee	def.	Darrion Caldwell	Submission (neck crank)	1	1:11	(Note: Bellator Featherweight World Grand Prix Semi-Final bout. Jitsmagazine BJJ Awards 'MMA Submission of the Year' 2020)
Welterweight	Jason Jackson	def.	Benson Henderson	Decision (unanimous) (30–27, 30–27, 30–27)	3	5:00
Welterweight	Joey Davis	def.	Bobby Lee	Decision (unanimous) (30–26, 30–27, 30–27)	3	5:00
Bantamweight	Raufeon Stots	def.	Keith Lee	Decision (unanimous) (30–27, 30–27, 30–27)	3	5:00
Preliminary card
Featherweight	Jeremy Kennedy	def.	Matt Bessette	Decision (unanimous) (30–27, 30–26, 30–26)	3	5:00
Welterweight	Jaleel Willis	def.	Mark Lemminger	Decision (unanimous) (29–28, 29–28, 29–28)	3	5:00
Featherweight	Jay Jay Wilson	def.	Sergio de Bari	KO (punches)	1	0:20
Lightweight	Kaheem Murray	def.	Kevin Ferguson Jr.	Decision (unanimous) (30–27, 30–27, 30–27)	3	5:00
Light Heavyweight	Sullivan Cauley	def.	Jason Markland	TKO (elbows and punches)	1	0:28

== Bellator 254 ==
Bellator 254: Macfarlane vs. Velasquez
- Date: December 10, 2020
- Venue: Mohegan Sun Arena
- City: Uncasville, Connecticut

Bellator 254: Macfarlane vs. Velasquez was a mixed martial arts event held on December 10, 2020 from the Mohegan Sun Arena in Uncasville, Connecticut. This event aired live on CBS Sports Network.

Background

The event featured a Women's Flyweight main event for the Bellator Women's Flyweight World Championship between Ilima-Lei Macfarlane and Juliana Velasquez.

At weigh ins, Goiti Yamauchi weighed in at 162.8 pounds, 6.8 pounds over the lightweight limit. The bout against PFL veteran, Nate Andrews was cancelled. Mohegan Sun commission head, Mike Mazzulli, said that from now on Yamauchi will be required to fight at Welterweight, 170 pounds.

A women's featherweight bout between Marina Mokhnatkina and Jessica Borga was scheduled for this event but cancelled a week before for unknown reasons.

This would be the last card to air on CBS Sports Network; all Bellator cards will air exclusively on Showtime beginning in April 2021.

Results

Main card
Weight class				Method	Round	Time	Notes
Women's Flyweight	Juliana Velasquez	def.	Ilima-Lei Macfarlane (c)	Decision (unanimous) (48–47, 49–46, 48–47)	5	5:00	(Note: For the Bellator Women's Flyweight World Championship)
Bantamweight	Magomed Magomedov	def.	Matheus Mattos	Decision (unanimous) (30–26, 30–27, 30–27)	3	5:00
Heavyweight	Linton Vassell	def.	Ronny Markes	TKO (punches)	2	3:37
Middleweight	Romero Cotton	def.	Justin Sumter	Submission (rear-naked choke)	1	3:36
Preliminary card
Welterweight	Shamil Nikaev	def.	Kemran Lachinov	Decision (unanimous) (29–28, 29–28, 29–28)	3	5:00
Light Heavyweight	Grant Neal	def.	Maurice Jackson	Submission (rear-naked choke)	2	3:59
Featherweight	Cody Law	def.	Kenny Champion	TKO (punches)	3	4:44
Welterweight	Billy Goff	def.	Robson Gracie Jr.	TKO (punches)	2	1:46

== See also ==
- List of current Bellator fighters
