= PFL 5 (2025) =

Professional Fighters League MMA event in 2025

- The poster for PFL 5
- Promotion: Professional Fighters League
- Date: June 12, 2025
- Venue: Nashville Municipal Auditorium
- City: Nashville, Tennessee, United States

Event chronology
PFL Paris 2025	PFL 5	PFL 6

The PFL 5 mixed martial arts event for the 2025 season of the Professional Fighters League was held on June 12, 2025, at the Nashville Municipal Auditorium in Nashville, Tennessee, United States. This event marked the semifinals of the single-elimination tournament format in the Welterweight and Featherweight divisions.

== Background ==
The event marked the promotion's second visit to Nashville and first since PFL 7 (2024) in August 2024.

The main card event featured the semifinals of 2025 PFL World Tournament in a welterweight and featherweight divisions.

At the weigh-ins, Anthony Ivy weighed in at 175.4 pounds, 4.4 pounds over the welterweight limit and he was fine a percentage of his purse, which went to Magomed Umalatov.

== Results ==
Main card (ESPN / ESPN+)
Weight class				Method	Round	Time	Notes
Welterweight	Thad Jean	def.	Jason Jackson	Decision (split) (29–28, 28–29, 30–27)	3	5:00	(Note: 2025 PFL Welterweight Tournament Semifinal.)
Featherweight	Jesus Pinedo	def.	Gabriel Braga	TKO (punches)	1	1:16	(Note: 2025 PFL Featherweight Tournament Semifinal.)
Welterweight	Logan Storley	def.	Masayuki Kikuiri	Decision (unanimous) (30–27, 29–27, 29–28)	3	5:00	(Note: 2025 PFL Welterweight Tournament Semifinal.)
Featherweight	Movlid Khaybulaev	def.	Kim Tae-kyun	Decision (unanimous) (30–27, 30–27, 30–27)	3	5:00	(Note: 2025 PFL Featherweight Tournament Semifinal.)
Preliminary card (ESPN+)
Featherweight	Ádám Borics	def.	Jeremy Kennedy	Decision (majority) (29–28, 28–28, 29–28)	3	5:00	(Note: 2025 PFL Featherweight Tournament Alternate bout.)
Catchweight (175 lb)	Magomed Umalatov	def.	Anthony Ivy	KO (punches)	1	2:28	(Note: 2025 PFL Welterweight Tournament Alternate bout; Ivy missed weight (175.4 lb).)
Welterweight	Sarek Shields	def.	Joseph Luciano	Decision (unanimous) (30–27, 30–27, 30–27)	3	5:00
Welterweight	Kendly St. Louis	def.	Mukhamed Berkhamov	Submission (rear-naked choke)	3	3:21
Featherweight	Alexei Pergande	def.	Mike Bardsley	Decision (unanimous) (30–27, 30–27, 30–27)	3	5:00
Bantamweight	Jason Danner	def.	Nathan Gilmore	Decision (unanimous) (30–27, 30–27, 29–28)	3	5:00

== Tournament brackets ==
=== 2025 PFL Welterweight Tournament ===
Quarter-finals
(Jamaica) Jason Jackson	SUB
(Russia) Andrey Koreshkov	2
(Russia) Mukhamed Berkhamov	1
(Haiti) Thad Jean (Note: Florim Zendeli withdrew from the tournament for unknown reasons and was replaced by Thad Jean.)	KO
(Australia) Joseph Luciano (Note: Magomed Umalatov missed weight (173.6 lb) and he was removed from the tournament. Alternate fighter Joseph Luciano stepped in instead.)	3
(United States) Logan Storley	UD
(Greece) Giannis Bachar	2
(Japan) Masayuki Kikuiri	TKO

Semi-finals
(Jamaica) Jason Jackson	3
(Haiti) Thad Jean	SD
(United States) Logan Storley	UD
(Japan) Masayuki Kikuiri	3

Final
(Haiti) Thad Jean
(United States) Logan Storley

=== 2025 PFL Featherweight Tournament ===
Quarter-finals
(Peru) Jesus Pinedo	TKO
(Hungary) Ádám Borics	1
(Brazil) Gabriel Braga	SUB
(Canada) Frederik Dupras (Note: Yves Landu withdrew from the tournament due to injury and was replaced by Frederik Dupras.)	1
(Canada) Jeremy Kennedy	3
(Russia) Movlid Khaybulaev	SD
(Republic of Ireland) Nathan Kelly	1
(South Korea) Kim Tae-kyun	SUB

Semi-finals
(Peru) Jesus Pinedo	TKO
(Brazil) Gabriel Braga	1
(Russia) Movlid Khaybulaev	UD
(South Korea) Kim Tae-kyun	3

Final
(Peru) Jesus Pinedo
(Russia) Movlid Khaybulaev

== See also ==
- 2025 in Professional Fighters League
- List of PFL events
- List of current PFL fighters
