= Thad Jean =

American mixed martial artist (born 1998)

- Born: July 16, 1998 (age 28); Broward County, Florida, U.S.
- Other names: The Silverback
- Height: 6 ft 2 in (188 cm)
- Weight: 170 lb (77 kg; 12 st 2 lb)
- Division: Welterweight
- Reach: 76 in (193 cm)
- Fighting out of: Fort Lauderdale, Florida, U.S.
- Team: Fight Sports Deerfield Beach
- Years active: 2021–present

Mixed martial arts record
- Total: 12
- Wins: 12
- By knockout: 6
- By submission: 1
- By decision: 5
- Losses: 0

Other information
- Mixed martial arts record from Sherdog

Thad Jean (born July 16, 1998) is an American professional mixed martial artist. He currently competes in the Welterweight division of the Professional Fighters League (PFL), where he is the current PFL Welterweight World Champion. He won the 2025 PFL Welterweight Tournament. As of April 21, 2026, he is #5 in the PFL men's pound-for-pound rankings.

== Background ==
Jean was born to Haitian parents in Broward County, Florida.

== Professional mixed martial arts career ==
=== Early career ===
Jean started his professional MMA career against Sage Philippe on August 6, 2021, at CES MMA 63, winning the bout submission via rear naked choke. He then faced Thomas Majeski on October 30, winning the bout by TKO via punches in the first round. Jean faced Sarek Shields at LFA 128 on April 8, 2022, again winning the bout by TKO via punches. In his last bout before PFL, he face Georgie Medina at a Combate Global event on September 30, winning the bout by unanimous decision.

=== Professional Fighters League ===
==== 2023 season ====
Jean faced Eric Alequin at PFL Challenger Series 9 on 27 January 2023. He won the bout by unanimous decision, securing a PFL contract.

Jean faced Ali Omar at PFL 7 on August 4, 2023. He won the fight via technical knockout in the first round via punches.

==== 2024 season ====
Jean faced Romain Debienne at PFL 3 on April 19, 2024. He won the fight by knockout via punches in the first round.

Jean faced Chris Brown on August 16, 2024, at PFL 8. He won the fight by unanimous decision.

==== 2025 season ====
In the opening round 2025 PFL Welterweight Tournament, Jean faced Mukhamed Berkhamov on April 3, 2025, at PFL 1. He won the bout in the first round of the fight by knockout via punches.

In the semifinals, Jean faced Jason Jackson at PFL 5 on June 12, 2025. He won the back-and-forth bout via split decision.

In the finals, Jean faced Logan Storley on August 1, 2025, at PFL 8. He won the bout by unanimous decision to win the tournament.

==== 2026 ====
Jean was scheduled to face Shamil Musaev for the vacant PFL Welterweight Championship on July 25, 2026, at PFL Washington DC. However, two days before the event, Musaev withdrew from the bout due to weight cut complications and was replaced by Ernesto Rodriguez. Jean won the title via technical knockout in round three.

== Championships and accomplishments ==
- Professional Fighters League
  - PFL Welterweight World Championship
    (One time, current)
  - 2025 PFL Welterweight Tournament Champion
- MMA Fighting
  - 2025 #5 Ranked Breakthrough Fighter of the Year

== Mixed martial arts record ==
Professional record breakdown
12 matches	12 wins	0 losses
By knockout	6	0
By submission	1	0
By decision	5	0

Res.	Record	Opponent	Method	Event	Date	Round	Time	Location	Notes
Win	12–0	Ernesto Rodriguez	TKO (punches)	PFL Washington DC: Jean vs. Rodriguez	July 25, 2026	3	2:44	Washington, D.C., United States	Won the vacant PFL Welterweight Championship.
Win	11–0	Logan Storley	Decision (unanimous)	PFL 8 (2025)	August 1, 2025	5	5:00	Atlantic City, New Jersey, United States	Won the 2025 PFL Welterweight Tournament.
Win	10–0	Jason Jackson	Decision (split)	PFL 5 (2025)	June 12, 2025	3	5:00	Nashville, Tennessee, United States	2025 PFL Welterweight Tournament Semifinal.
Win	9–0	Mukhamed Berkhamov	KO (punches)	PFL 1 (2025)	April 3, 2025	1	4:25	Orlando, Florida, United States	2025 PFL Welterweight Tournament Quarterfinal.
Win	8–0	Chris Brown	Decision (unanimous)	PFL 8 (2024)	August 16, 2024	3	5:00	Hollywood, Florida, United States	
Win	7–0	Romain Debienne	KO (punches)	PFL 3 (2024)	April 19, 2024	1	2:07	Chicago, Illinois, United States	
Win	6–0	Ali Omar	TKO (punches)	PFL 7 (2023)	August 4, 2023	1	1:54	San Antonio, Texas, United States	
Win	5–0	Eric Alequin	Decision (unanimous)	PFL Challenger Series 9	January 27, 2023	3	5:00	Orlando, Florida, United States	
Win	4–0	Georgie Medina	Decision (unanimous)	Combate Global: Romero vs. Ayala	September 30, 2022	3	5:00	Miami, Florida, United States	
Win	3–0	Sarek Shields	TKO (punches)	LFA 128	April 8, 2022	2	3:40	Sioux Falls, South Dakota, United States	Catchweight (171.8 lb) bout; Jean missed weight.
Win	2–0	Thomas Majeski	TKO (punches)	Cage Fury FC 102	October 30, 2021	1	4:19	Philadelphia, Pennsylvania, United States	
Win	1–0	Sage Philippe	Submission (rear-naked choke)	CES MMA 63	August 6, 2021	1	3:59	Springfield, Massachusetts, United States	Welterweight debut.

== See also ==
- List of current PFL fighters
- List of male mixed martial artists
