= PFL 1 (2025) =

Professional Fighters League MMA event in 2025

- The poster for PFL 1
- Promotion: Professional Fighters League
- Date: April 3, 2025
- Venue: Universal Studios Florida
- City: Orlando, Florida, United States

Event chronology
PFL Champions Series 1: Nurmagomedov vs. Hughes	PFL 1	PFL 2

The PFL 1 mixed martial arts event for the 2025 season of the Professional Fighters League was held on April 3, 2025, at the Universal Studios Florida in Orlando, Florida, United States. This event marked the quarterfinal of the single-elimination tournament format in the Welterweight and Featherweight divisions.

== Background ==
The event marked the promotion's first visit to Orlando.

The event featured the quarterfinal of 2025 PFL World Tournament in a welterweight and featherweight divisions.

2024 PFL Europe welterweight winner Florim Zendeli withdrew from the welterweight quarterfinal against Mukhamed Berkhamov and was replaced by Thad Jean, who scheduled to face Joseph Luciano in an alternate bout and was replaced by Sarek Shields.

Subsequently, Yves Landu withdrew from the featherweight quarterfinal against Gabriel Braga and was replaced by Frederick Dupas, who scheduled to face Nathan Ghareeb in an alternate bout.

At weigh-ins, Magomed Umalatov weighed in at 173.6 pounds, 2.6 pounds over the welterweight limit. As a result, he was removed from the Welterweight tournament, with alternate fighter Joseph Luciano took his place against former interim Bellator Welterweight World Champion Logan Storley.

== Results ==
Main card (ESPN2 / ESPN+)
Weight class				Method	Round	Time	Notes
Welterweight	Jason Jackson	def.	Andrey Koreshkov	Technical Submission (rear-naked choke)	2	4:21	(Note: 2025 PFL Welterweight Tournament Quarterfinal.)
Featherweight	Jesus Pinedo	def.	Ádám Borics	TKO (punches)	1	3:43	(Note: 2025 PFL Featherweight Tournament Quarterfinal.)
Welterweight	Logan Storley	def.	Joseph Luciano	Decision (unanimous) (30–27, 30–27, 30–27)	3	5:00	(Note: 2025 PFL Welterweight Tournament Quarterfinal.)
Featherweight	Movlid Khaybulaev	def.	Jeremy Kennedy	Decision (split) (28–29, 29–28, 29–28)	3	5:00	(Note: 2025 PFL Featherweight Tournament Quarterfinal.)
Preliminary card (ESPN+)
Welterweight	Thad Jean	def.	Mukhamed Berkhamov	KO (punches)	1	4:25	(Note: 2025 PFL Welterweight Tournament Quarterfinal.)
Featherweight	Gabriel Braga	def.	Frederik Dupras	Submission (neck crank)	1	4:37	(Note: 2025 PFL Featherweight Tournament Quarterfinal.)
Welterweight	Masayuki Kikuiri	def.	Giannis Bachar	TKO (retirement)	2	5:00	(Note: 2025 PFL Welterweight Tournament Quarterfinal.)
Featherweight	Kim Tae-kyun	def.	Nathan Kelly	Technical Submission (rear-naked choke)	1	4:53	(Note: 2025 PFL Featherweight Tournament Quarterfinal.)

== Tournament brackets ==
=== 2025 PFL Welterweight Tournament ===
Quarter-finals
(Jamaica) Jason Jackson	SUB
(Russia) Andrey Koreshkov	2
(Russia) Mukhamed Berkhamov	1
(Haiti) Thad Jean (Note: Florim Zendeli withdrew from the tournament for unknown reasons and was replaced by Thad Jean.)	KO
(Australia) Joseph Luciano (Note: Magomed Umalatov missed weight (173.6 lb) and he was removed from the tournament. Alternate fighter Joseph Luciano stepped in instead.)	3
(United States) Logan Storley	UD
(Greece) Giannis Bachar	2
(Japan) Masayuki Kikuiri	TKO

Semi-finals
(Jamaica) Jason Jackson
(Haiti) Thad Jean
(United States) Logan Storley
(Japan) Masayuki Kikuiri

Final

=== 2025 PFL Featherweight Tournament ===
Quarter-finals
(Peru) Jesus Pinedo	TKO
(Hungary) Ádám Borics	1
(Brazil) Gabriel Braga	SUB
(Canada) Frederik Dupras (Note: Yves Landu withdrew from the tournament due to injury and was replaced by Frederik Dupras.)	1
(Canada) Jeremy Kennedy	3
(Russia) Movlid Khaybulaev	SD
(Republic of Ireland) Nathan Kelly	1
(South Korea) Kim Tae-kyun	SUB

Semi-finals
(Peru) Jesus Pinedo
(Brazil) Gabriel Braga
(Russia) Movlid Khaybulaev
(South Korea) Kim Tae-kyun

Final

== See also ==
- 2025 in Professional Fighters League
- List of PFL events
- List of current PFL fighters
