= Jason Jackson (fighter) =

Jamaican mixed martial arts fighter

- Born: October 30, 1990 (age 36); Spanish Town, Jamaica
- Other names: The Ass-Kicking Machine
- Height: 6 ft 1 in (1.85 m)
- Weight: 170 lb (77 kg; 12 st 2 lb)
- Division: Welterweight
- Reach: 78 in (198 cm)
- Fighting out of: Hollywood, Florida, U.S.
- Team: Kill Cliff FC
- Years active: 2012–present

Mixed martial arts record
- Total: 26
- Wins: 20
- By knockout: 7
- By submission: 4
- By decision: 9
- Losses: 6
- By knockout: 2
- By decision: 4

Other information
- Mixed martial arts record from Sherdog

Jason Jackson (born October 30, 1990) is a Jamaican mixed martial artist who competes in the Welterweight division. Jackson has competed in Titan FC, Legacy Fighting Alliance (LFA), Professional Fighters League (PFL), and most notably Bellator MMA, where he is a former Bellator Welterweight World Champion. He also appeared on the UFC's reality television series The Ultimate Fighter: American Top Team vs. Blackzilians.

== Background ==
Jackson was born in Spanish Town, Jamaica on October 30, 1990. At the age of 12 he moved to South Florida, graduating from Miramar High School, where he competed on the school’s wrestling team. Growing up he was a fan of professional wrestling and the WWE. He began training for mixed martial arts at the age of 19 with The Blackzilians.

== Mixed martial arts career ==
=== Early career ===
Jackson made his professional debut in 2012, compiling a record of 5–2 in regional promotions, where he competed against future UFC fighter Colby Covington.

=== The Ultimate Fighter ===
In February 2015, it was announced Jackson would be a contestant on The Ultimate Fighter: American Top Team vs. Blackzilians.

Jackson's first fight on TUF was against Marcelo Alfaya, whom he defeated by majority decision.

In his second fight on the show he faced future Titan FC Welterweight Champion Michael Graves. Early in the first round Jackson connected with a groin kick that went unnoticed by the referee and almost finished Graves with punches. However Graves survived and submitted Jackson with a rear naked choke in round one, eliminating him from the tournament.

=== Titan Fighting Championships ===
Jackson made his Titan FC debut against Rodrigo Cavalheiro Correia on September 9, 2016, at Titan FC 41. He won the fight via unanimous decision.

Jackson then competed in a title match against Titan FC Welterweight Champion and future UFC fighter, Dhiego Lima on December 2, 2016, at Titan FC 42. Jackson won the fight via technical knockout early in round one, claiming the Titan FC Welterweight Championship.

Jackson vacated his title after being invited to compete on Dana White's Contender Series. He faced Kyle Stewart, and lost the fight via TKO in round two after suffering an ankle injury that rendered him unable to continue. He was not awarded a UFC contract as a result.

=== Bellator MMA ===
Jackson made his Bellator MMA debut against Jordon Larson on August 17, 2018, at Bellator 204. He won the fight via TKO in round one.

After picking up two wins in the Legacy Fighting Alliance promotion, Jackson returned to Bellator, facing Ed Ruth on October 25, 2019, at Bellator 231. He lost the fight via controversial split decision. 4 out of 6 media outlets scored the fight for Jackson.

Jackson faced Kiichi Kunimoto on December 21, 2019, at Bellator 236. He won the fight via unanimous decision.

Jackson then faced promotional newcomer Jordan Mein on July 24, 2020, at Bellator 242. He won the fight via unanimous decision.

Jackson then faced former UFC Lightweight Champion and former Bellator Lightweight Championship contender, Benson Henderson on November 28, 2020, at Bellator 253. Jackson controlled a majority of the fight, winning via unanimous decision in an upset victory.

Jackson next faced Neiman Gracie on April 2, 2021, at Bellator 255. He won the close fight via unanimous decision.

Jackson faced Paul Daley on June 11, 2021, at Bellator 260. Jackson used his wrestling to dominate Daley, winning the fight via unanimous decision.

Jackson was scheduled to face former Bellator Welterweight Champion Douglas Lima on May 13, 2022, at Bellator London. However the fight was postponed to July 24, 2022, at Bellator 283 for undisclosed reasons. At the weigh-ins, Douglas Lima, came in at 172.8 lbs, 1.8 pounds heavy for his headlining welterweight bout. The bout proceeded at a catchweight and Lima was fined a percentage of his individual purse, which went to Jackson. Jackson won the fight via unanimous decision.

==== Bellator Welterweight champion ====
Jackson fought for the Bellator Welterweight World Championship against reigning champion Yaroslav Amosov on November 17, 2023, at Bellator 301. In an upset, Jackson was able to stuff all of Amosov's takedowns and proceeded to knock him out with uppercuts in the third round, being the first person to defeat Amosov ever.

Jackson was scheduled to face 2023 PFL welterweight champion Magomed Magomedkerimov in a 3 round non-title crossover fight on February 24, 2024, at PFL vs. Bellator. However, Magomedkerimov withdrew due to injury in January 2024 and was replaced by Ray Cooper III, with the bout taking place at a catchweight of 182 pounds. Jackson dominated the bout with leg kicks and eventually won by technical knockout due to ground and pound in the second round.

Jackson faced Ramazan Kuramagomedov on June 22, 2024, at Bellator Champions Series 3. He lost the bout and championship by unanimous decision.

=== Professional Fighters League ===
On February 11, 2025, the promotion officially revealed that Jackson will join the 2025 PFL Welterweight Tournament.

Jackson faced Andrey Koreshkov in a welterweight bout at the 2025 PFL World Tournament: First Round at PFL 1 on April 3, 2025. He won the fight via a technical submission due to a rear-naked choke in the second round.

In the semifinals, Jackson faced Thad Jean at PFL 5 (2025) on June 12, 2025. He lost the back-and-forth bout via split decision.

=== Most Valuable Promotions ===
Jackson was scheduled to face Lorenz Larkin at MVP MMA 1 on May 16, 2026. However, Larkin pulled out due to an injury and was replaced by Jefferson Creighton. Jackson won the fight by knockout early in the first round.

== Personal life ==
Jackson is married to his wife Yanisuka. They have 2 children and 2 stepchildren.

Jackson is a fan of WWE, with his nickname "The Ass-Kicking Machine" being inspired from an angle between The Rock, Kane, and Hulk Hogan.

== Championships and accomplishments ==
- Bellator MMA
  - Bellator Welterweight World Championship (One time; former)
  - PFL vs. Bellator Champions of Champions Super Belt (One time)
- Titan Fighting Championship
  - Titan FC Welterweight Championship (One time)
- Legacy Fighting Alliance
  - LFA Welterweight Championship (One time)
- Victory Fighting Championships
  - VFC Welterweight Championship (One time) (One time)

== Mixed martial arts record ==
Professional record breakdown
26 matches	20 wins	6 losses
By knockout	7	2
By submission	4	0
By decision	9	4

Res.	Record	Opponent	Method	Event	Date	Round	Time	Location	Notes
Win	20–6	Jefferson Creighton	KO (punch)	MVP MMA: Rousey vs. Carano	May 16, 2026	1	0:20	Inglewood, California, United States	
Loss	19–6	Thad Jean	Decision (split)	PFL 5 (2025)	June 12, 2025	3	5:00	Nashville, Tennessee, United States	2025 PFL Welterweight Tournament Semifinal.
Win	19–5	Andrey Koreshkov	Technical Submission (rear-naked choke)	PFL 1 (2025)	April 3, 2025	2	4:21	Orlando, Florida, United States	2025 PFL Welterweight Tournament Quarterfinal.
Loss	18–5	Ramazan Kuramagomedov	Decision (unanimous)	Bellator Champions Series 3	June 22, 2024	5	5:00	Dublin, Ireland	Lost the Bellator Welterweight World Championship.
Win	18–4	Ray Cooper III	TKO (leg kick and punches)	PFL vs. Bellator	February 24, 2024	2	0:23	Riyadh, Saudi Arabia	Catchweight (182 lb) bout.
Win	17–4	Yaroslav Amosov	KO (punches)	Bellator 301	November 17, 2023	3	2:08	Chicago, Illinois, United States	Won the Bellator Welterweight World Championship.
Win	16–4	Douglas Lima	Decision (unanimous)	Bellator 283	July 22, 2022	5	5:00	Tacoma, Washington, United States	Catchweight (172.8 lb) bout; Lima missed weight.
Win	15–4	Paul Daley	Decision (unanimous)	Bellator 260	June 11, 2021	3	5:00	Uncasville, Connecticut, United States	Catchweight (175 lb) bout.
Win	14–4	Neiman Gracie	Decision (unanimous)	Bellator 255	April 2, 2021	3	5:00	Uncasville, Connecticut, United States	
Win	13–4	Benson Henderson	Decision (unanimous)	Bellator 253	November 19, 2020	3	5:00	Uncasville, Connecticut, United States	
Win	12–4	Jordan Mein	Decision (unanimous)	Bellator 242	July 24, 2020	3	5:00	Uncasville, Connecticut, United States	
Win	11–4	Kiichi Kunimoto	Decision (unanimous)	Bellator 236	December 21, 2019	3	5:00	Honolulu, Hawaii, United States	
Loss	10–4	Ed Ruth	Decision (split)	Bellator 231	October 25, 2019	3	5:00	Uncasville, Connecticut, United States	
Win	10–3	Hemerson Souza	Decision (split)	LFA 71	July 12, 2019	5	5:00	Atlanta, Georgia, United States	Won the vacant LFA Welterweight Championship.
Win	9–3	Scott Futrell	Submission (arm-triangle choke)	LFA 64	April 26, 2019	2	4:07	Sioux Falls, South Dakota, United States	Catchweight (180 lb) bout.
Win	8–3	Jordon Larson	TKO (punches)	Bellator 204	August 17, 2018	1	3:52	Sioux Falls, South Dakota, United States	
Loss	7–3	Kyle Stewart	TKO (ankle injury)	Dana White's Contender Series 3	July 25, 2017	2	0:21	Las Vegas, Nevada, United States	
Win	7–2	Dhiego Lima	TKO (punches)	Titan FC 42	December 2, 2016	1	2:10	Coral Gables, Florida, United States	Won the Titan FC Welterweight Championship.
Win	6–2	Rodrigo Cavalheiro	Decision (unanimous)	Titan FC 41	September 9, 2016	3	5:00	Coral Gables, Florida, United States	
Win	5–2	Victor Moreno	TKO (punches)	Victory FC 48	February 19, 2016	1	1:55	Urbandale, Iowa, United States	Won the vacant Victory FC Welterweight Championship.
Win	4–2	Michael Lilly	Decision (unanimous)	Fight Time 20	August 29, 2014	3	5:00	Fort Lauderdale, Florida, United States	
Loss	3–2	Hayder Hassan	TKO (punches)	CFA 12	October 12, 2013	3	2:32	Miami, Florida, United States	
Win	3–1	Michael Johnson	Submission (triangle choke)	Fight Time 12	November 2, 2012	2	2:05	Fort Lauderdale, Florida, United States	Catchweight (173 lb) bout; Johnson missed weight.
Win	2–1	Efrain Cintron	Submission (triangle choke)	Fight Time 11	August 24, 2012	2	1:10	Fort Lauderdale, Florida, United States	
Loss	1–1	Colby Covington	Decision (unanimous)	Fight Time 10	June 22, 2012	3	5:00	Fort Lauderdale, Florida, United States	
Win	1–0	Jerome Buchanan	TKO (punches)	Fight Time 9	April 27, 2012	1	0:55	Fort Lauderdale, Florida, United States	

== See also ==
- List of male mixed martial artists
- List of Dana White's Contender Series alumni
