= Ádám Borics =

Hungarian mixed martial arts fighter

- Born: July 7, 1993 (age 33); Eger, Hungary
- Nationality: Hungarian
- Height: 5 ft 11 in (1.80 m)
- Weight: 145 lb (66 kg; 10 st 5 lb)
- Division: Featherweight
- Reach: 70 1/2 in (179 cm)
- Style: Black belt in Kenpō
- Team: Kill Cliff FC
- Years active: 2014–present

Mixed martial arts record
- Total: 25
- Wins: 21
- By knockout: 4
- By submission: 7
- By decision: 9
- By disqualification: 1
- Losses: 4
- By knockout: 1
- By submission: 1
- By decision: 2

Other information
- Website: https://www.adamborics.hu/
- Mixed martial arts record from Sherdog

Ádám Borics (born July 7, 1993) is a Hungarian mixed martial artist who competes in the Featherweight division of the Professional Fighters League. He previously competed for Bellator MMA, where he was a Featherweight title challenger. As of July 6, 2026, he is #7 in the PFL featherweight rankings.

== Early life ==
Ádám Borics was born in Eger on 7 July 1993. He was raised in a village called Sirok. He started his studies there and spent his free time working out and playing football. At the age of 16 he started training Muay Thai with one of his friends and at the age of 17 he took part in his very first MMA training and fell in love with the sport.

He was admitted to the University of Physical Education, but he decided to focus his financial and physical resources on sports, so he stopped his studies and took up a job in addition to training. At first, he worked as a masseuse and led training sessions himself.

== Mixed martial arts career ==
=== Amateur career ===
During secondary school Borics took part in numerous Kempo and amateur MMA fights to develop. When he finished his studies, he moved to Eger for better possibilities. Since he was in need of money to pay his trainings, he started teaching MMA and gave massages too.

=== Professional career ===
Borics made his debut at the 5th event of HFC (Hungarian Fight Championship) on 1 August 2014. His opponent was Dániel Hajzer, who got submitted via heel hook shortly after 1 minute.

On 11 October, he faced József Tárnai on HFC 6. Ádám won by unanimous decision. He also faced Ádám Németh the same night, whom he defeated in the 2nd round with by knockout.

In his fourth match, Ádám fought for the HFC 65 kg (143 pound) belt against Benjámin Molnár. The match didn't go as planned, as in the middle of the 4th round Molnar was disqualified for using an illegal slam, so "The Kid" won the first belt on 15 November 2014, at the age of 21.

Borics' first non-Hungarian bout took place in Sarajevo at FFC 7, in featherweight. The Hungarian beat Croatia's Marko Burušić in March 2015.

In his next match, on 9 May 2015, he defended his HFC belt against Jaroslav Jarim on HFC 9. He defeated his Czech opponent with a Triangle choke at the end of the first round.

On HFC 10, he defeated Benjámin Molnár, against whom Borics had won his belt. This was Ádám's last match at the Hungarian organization, from which he left with a record of 6–0 at the end of 2015, after defending his title twice.

In his 8th professional bout, Borics was fighting again in the Final Fight Championship. At FFC 20, Matija Blažičević, a Croatian martial artist. Borics won via split decision.

FFC 23 was held in Vienna on April 18, 2016, where Borics fought against Manuel Bilić. He won via triangle choke.

=== Bellator ===
In early 2017, Borics travelled to America for 3 weeks to a training camp. He joined the Hard Knocks 365 team (Sanford MMA since 2019) for a few weeks.

Bellator 177 was held 14 April 2017, which was also the first event to be held in Hungary. They gave The Kid a chance to fight against Anthony Taylor. Borics defeated his opponent via rear-naked choke, earning him the 10th win of his career, rewarding him a contract with the Bellator MMA organization for 4 matches.

Borics moved to the United States with his wife, but he had to wait almost an entire year for his next bout, because Ádi's hand was fractured 2 weeks after moving. On 6 April 2018, he returned into the cage again in Budapest at Bellator 196 and knocked out Teodor Nikolov in the 2nd round with his signature flying knee in front of his home audience.

Next time Borics fought Josenaldo Silva, on 21 September 2018 at Bellator 205. Borics submitted Silva in the third round.

Next time he faced Aaron Pico on Bellator 222, on 14 June 2019. Ádám won by TKO via flying knee in the Madison Square Garden. After his first 4 fights in Bellator, the Borics had 4 victories, and finished all of them. With that, he also earned a new contract.

==== Bellator featherweight tournament ====
Borics was selected as one of the 16 martial artists to take part in the Bellator Featherweight Tournament.

In the first round of the tournament, Borics got former champion Pat Curran as his opponent. The fight was held on 7 September 2019 on Bellator 226. Borics won by TKO. The victory allowed him to advance to the quarterfinals of the tournament.

In the quarter-finals, Borics took on former bantamweight Bellator champion Darrion Caldwell. The fight took place on 25 January 2020 on Bellator 238. In first round, Caldwell submitted Ádám with a rear-naked choke. This was the Hungarian's first defeat in martial arts.

==== Catchweight ====
Borics had his next two bouts in catchweight, 150 pounds. Borics faced Mike Hamell on 7 August 2020 on Bellator 243. Hamel couldn't make weight at weigh-ins. Borics won by split decision.

His next opponent was Erick Sánchez. Borics won by unanimous decision on 19 October 2020, on Bellator 250.

==== Return to featherweight ====
On April 9, 2021, at Bellator 256, Borics took on Jeremy Kennedy. Borics defeated Kennedy by unanimous decision.

Borics was scheduled to face Jay-Jay Wilson for the #1 contender status on August 20, 2021, at Bellator 265. However, at the weigh-ins, Wilson came in at 150.4 pounds, missing weight by 4.4 pounds. As a result, the fight has been scrapped and Borics was paid his show money.

Borics headlined against Mads Burnell on March 12, 2022, at Bellator 276. He won the bout via unanimous decision, in what many consider to be one of the most entertaining matches of the year.

Borics challenged for the Bellator Featherweight Championship against reigning champ Patrício Pitbull on October 1, 2022, at Bellator 286. He lost the bout via unanimous decision.

=== Professional Fighters League ===
In his PFL debut, Borics faced Enrique Barzola on April 19, 2024, at PFL 3 (2024). He won the fight by unanimous decision.

Borics was scheduled to face former Cage Warriors Bantamweight Champion Brett Johns on June 28, 2024, at PFL 6, but Borics pulled out and was replaced by Tyler Diamond.

On February 12, 2025, the promotion officially revealed that Borics will join the 2025 PFL Featherweight Tournament. In the opening round, he faced Jesus Pinedo at PFL 1 on April 3, 2025. He lost the fight via TKO in the first round.

Borics returned to the tournament in an alternate bout again Jeremy Kennedy at PFL 5 (2025) on June 12, 2025. He won the fight via majority decision.

Borics faced A. J. McKee on March 20, 2026, at PFL Madrid: van Steenis vs. Edwards 2. He lost the bout via unanimous decision.

Borics faced Khasan Magomedsharipov on November 14, 2026, at PFL Dubai 2. He won the fight via an arm-triangle submission in the first round.

== Personal life ==
Ádám Borics lives with his wife, Zsófia Perge in Pompano Beach, Florida, United States. They married in 2017 before moving to the US. Ádám has a brother.

== Championships and accomplishments ==
- Hungarian Fight Championship
  - HFC Featherweight Championship (one time)
    - Two successful title defenses

== Mixed martial arts record ==
Professional record breakdown
25 matches	21 wins	4 losses
By knockout	4	1
By submission	7	1
By decision	9	2
By disqualification	1	0

Res.	Record	Opponent	Method	Event	Date	Round	Time	Location	Notes
Win	21–4	Khasan Magomedsharipov	Submission (triangle armbar)	PFL Dubai: Nemkov vs. Bilostenniy	November 14, 2026	1	4:17	Dubai, United Arab Emirates	
Loss	20–4	A. J. McKee	Decision (unanimous)	PFL Madrid: van Steenis vs. Edwards 2	March 20, 2026	3	5:00	Madrid, Spain	
Win	20–3	Jeremy Kennedy	Decision (majority)	PFL 5 (2025)	June 12, 2025	3	5:00	Nashville, Tennessee, United States	2025 PFL Featherweight Tournament Alternate bout.
Loss	19–3	Jesus Pinedo	TKO (punches)	PFL 1 (2025)	April 3, 2025	1	3:43	Orlando, Florida, United States	2025 PFL Featherweight Tournament Quarterfinal.
Win	19–2	Enrique Barzola	Decision (unanimous)	PFL 3 (2024)	April 19, 2024	3	5:00	Chicago, Illinois, United States	
Loss	18–2	Patrício Pitbull	Decision (unanimous)	Bellator 286	October 1, 2022	5	5:00	Long Beach, California, United States	For the Bellator Featherweight World Championship.
Win	18–1	Mads Burnell	Decision (unanimous)	Bellator 276	March 12, 2022	5	5:00	St. Louis, Missouri, United States	
Win	17–1	Jeremy Kennedy	Decision (unanimous)	Bellator 256	April 9, 2021	3	5:00	Uncasville, Connecticut, United States	
Win	16–1	Erick Sánchez	Decision (unanimous)	Bellator 250	October 29, 2020	3	5:00	Uncasville, Connecticut, United States	Catchweight (150 lb) bout.
Win	15–1	Mike Hamel	Decision (split)	Bellator 243	August 7, 2020	3	5:00	Uncasville, Connecticut, United States	Catchweight (150 lb) bout.
Loss	14–1	Darrion Caldwell	Submission (rear-naked choke)	Bellator 238	January 25, 2020	1	2:20	Inglewood, California, United States	Bellator Featherweight World Grand Prix Quarterfinal.
Win	14–0	Pat Curran	TKO (punches)	Bellator 226	September 7, 2019	2	4:59	San Jose, California, United States	Bellator Featherweight World Grand Prix Opening Round.
Win	13–0	Aaron Pico	TKO (flying knee and punches)	Bellator 222	June 14, 2019	2	3:55	New York City, New York, United States	
Win	12–0	Josenaldo Silva	Submission (rear-naked choke)	Bellator 205	September 21, 2018	3	1:46	Boise, Idaho, United States	
Win	11–0	Teodor Nikolov	KO (flying knee)	Bellator 196	April 6, 2018	2	2:25	Budapest, Hungary	
Win	10–0	Anthony Taylor	Submission (rear-naked choke)	Bellator 177	April 14, 2017	1	4:12	Budapest, Hungary	
Win	9–0	Manuel Bilić	Submission (triangle choke)	Final Fight Championship 23	March 18, 2016	2	3:32	Vienna, Austria	
Win	8–0	Matija Blažičević	Decision (split)	Final Fight Championship 20	October 23, 2015	3	5:00	Zagrab, Croatia	
Win	7–0	Benjámin Molnár	Submission (triangle choke)	Premium MMA Liga: Hungarian FC 10	September 19, 2015	2	4:17	Zalaegerszeg, Hungary	Defended the Hungarian FC Featherweight Championship
Win	6–0	Jaroslav Jartim	Submission (triangle choke)	Premium MMA Liga: Hungarian FC 9	September 9, 2015	1	4:14	Győr, Hungary	Defended the Hungarian FC Featherweight Championship
Win	5–0	Marko Burušić	Decision (unanimous)	Final Fight Championship 7	March 13, 2015	3	5:00	Sarajevo, Bosnia and Herzegovina	
Win	4–0	Benjámin Molnár	DQ (illegal slam)	Premium MMA Liga: Hungarian FC 7	November 15, 2014	4	2:46	Budapest, Hungary	Won the Hungarian FC Featherweight Championship
Win	3–0	Németh Ádám	KO (flying knee)	Premium MMA Liga: Hungarian FC 6	October 11, 2014	2	3:45	Pápa, Hungary	Won the Hungarian FC Featherweight Tournament.
Win	2–0	Tárnai József	Decision (unanimous)	Premium MMA Liga: Hungarian FC 6	October 11, 2014	3	5:00	Pápa, Hungary	Hungarian FC Featherweight Tournament Semifinal.
Win	1–0	Hajzer Dániel	Submission (leglock)	Premium MMA Liga: Hungarian FC 5	August 1, 2014	1	1:09	Siófok, Hungary	Featherweight debut.

== See also ==
- List of current Bellator fighters
- List of male mixed martial artists
