= Jeremy Kennedy =

Canadian mixed martial arts fighter

- Born: Jeremy Michael Fitz-Kennedy; September 16, 1992 (age 34); Surrey, British Columbia, Canada
- Other names: JBC, The Bandit
- Nationality: Canadian
- Height: 5 ft 11 in (1.80 m)
- Weight: 145 lb (66 kg; 10.4 st)
- Division: Lightweight; Featherweight; Bantamweight
- Reach: 71 in (180 cm)
- Stance: Orthodox
- Fighting out of: Surrey, British Columbia, Canada
- Team: Revolution MMA; Xtreme Couture (2018–present)
- Rank: Black belt in Brazilian Jiu-Jitsu under Bibiano Fernandes
- Years active: 2013–present

Mixed martial arts record
- Total: 30
- Wins: 22
- By knockout: 7
- By submission: 3
- By decision: 12
- Losses: 7
- By knockout: 3
- By decision: 4
- No contests: 1

Other information
- Mixed martial arts record from Sherdog

Jeremy Michael Fitz-Kennedy (born September 16, 1992) is a Canadian mixed martial artist who competes in the Featherweight division. He has previously fought for the Professional Fighters League (PFL), Bellator MMA, and the Ultimate Fighting Championship (UFC).

== Background ==
Kennedy was born and raised in Fleetwood, Surrey, British Columbia, Canada. He started training boxing and Brazilian jiu-jitsu at the age of 13 to put up with his older brother. He graduated from Fleetwood Park Secondary School.

== Mixed martial arts career ==
=== Early career ===
Before joining the UFC, Kennedy held both the Battlefield Fight League Amateur and Professional Featherweight Championships while amassing an amateur record of 8–1 and a professional record of 8–0.

=== Ultimate Fighting Championship ===
Kennedy made his promotional debut on August 27, 2016, at UFC on Fox 21 against Alessandro Ricci. He won the fight by unanimous decision.

Kennedy was briefly tabbed as a short notice replacement to face Mirsad Bektic on October 8, 2016, at UFC 204. Subsequently, after his participation was publicly confirmed, Kennedy indicated he was injured and unable to take the fight. He was replaced by Russell Doane.

Kennedy next faced Rony Jason on March 11, 2017, at UFC Fight Night 106. He won the bout by unanimous decision.

Kennedy faced Kyle Bochniak on July 22, 2017, at UFC on Fox 25. Kennedy won the fight via unanimous decision.

Kennedy was scheduled to face Alexander Volkanovski at UFC Fight Night: Hunt vs. Tybura on 19 November 2017. However, Kennedy pulled out of the fight on October 5 citing a back injury.

The bout with Volkanovski was rescheduled and took place on February 11, 2018, at UFC 221. He lost the fight via technical knockout in round two.

=== Brave Combat Federation ===
Kennedy's contract with the UFC ended after the Volkanovski bout and Kennedy grew tired of the contract negotiations for renewing, eventually leading him to sign with a new promotion - Brave CF. Kennedy headlined Brave 14 against Danyel Pilo on August 18, 2018. He won the fight via knockout in round one.

Kennedy was expected to face Marcos Galvão at PFL 8 for the alternate spot in the Professional Fighters League's 2018 featherweight tournament. Due to a misunderstanding when making the contract with Brave CF, Kennedy assumed he was eligible to compete in other organizations' events. Just before Kennedy's fight, Brave CF officials contacted PFL to deny him from fighting. Briefly after the news surfaced, Brave CF officials revealed that Kennedy had signed a bout agreement to fight Marat Magomedov at Brave 18 on November 16, 2018.

Kennedy headlined Brave 21 against Magomedov on December 28, 2018. He won the fight via TKO in the third round.

=== Professional Fighters League ===
In 2019, Kennedy joined the Professional Fighters League as an entrant in their 2019 Featherweight tournament. He was scheduled to face Alexandre Bezerra in the opening round, but Bezerra missed weight and was replaced by Luis Rafael Laurentino. Kennedy lost the fight via TKO in the first round.

In the second round of PFL 2 regular season, Kennedy faced Steven Siler at PFL 5 on July 25, 2019. He won the fight by unanimous decision and advanced to the playoffs.

In the quarterfinals, Kennedy faced Luis Rafael Laurentino at PFL 8 on October 17, 2019. He won the fight via second-round knockout and advanced to the semifinals contested later on the same day. In semifinals Kennedy lost to Daniel Pineda via first round submission and was eliminated from the tournament. However, Pineda tested positive for a banned substance and the result was overturned to no contest.

=== Bellator MMA ===
Kennedy signed with Bellator MMA in October 2020. He made his promotional debut against Matt Bessette at Bellator 253 on November 19, 2020. Kennedy won the fight by unanimous decision.

Kennedy faced Ádám Borics on April 9, 2021, at Bellator 256. He lost the bout via unanimous decision.

Kennedy faced Emmanuel Sanchez on December 3, 2021, at Bellator 272. He won the bout via unanimous decision.

Kennedy was scheduled to face Aaron Pico on April 15, 2022, at Bellator 277. However, for unknown reasons, Kennedy withdrew 8 days before the event.

The bout against Aaron Pico was rebooked for October 1, 2022 at Bellator 286. After Pico hurt his shoulder midway through the first round, the bout was stopped after the first round by the doctor.

Kennedy faced Pedro Carvalho on February 25, 2023, at Bellator 291. He won the fight by unanimous decision.

Kennedy was scheduled to face James Gallagher on March 22, 2024, at Bellator Champions Series 1. However, at the beginning of the month, Kennedy was rescheduled for a Bellator Featherweight Championship bout against reigning champion Patrício Pitbull. Despite cutting Pitbull and stumbling him, he lost the bout in the third round as Pitbull landed a flurry of punches and knees on Kennedy.

=== Return to PFL ===
Kennedy was scheduled to face Jesus Pinedo on November 29, 2024, at PFL 10. However, Pinedo withdrew from the bout due to missing weight by six pounds and was replaced by Gabriel Alves Braga on one day's notice. Braga won the bout against Kennedy by unanimous decision.

On February 12, 2025, the promotion officially revealed that Kennedy joined the 2025 PFL Featherweight Tournament.

In the quarterfinal, Kennedy faced Movlid Khaybulaev on April 3, 2025, at PFL 1. He lost the back-and-forth fight by split decision.

Kennedy returned to the tournament in an alternate bout again Ádám Borics at PFL 5 (2025) on June 12, 2025. He lost the fight via majority decision.

=== Post PFL ===
Kennedy fought Jeremy Henry on September 4, 2025 for the BFL Lightweight Championship at BFL 84. Kennedy won the fight via submission in round 4.

== Championships and accomplishments ==
- Battlefield Fight League
  - BFL Featherweight Championship (One time)
  - Interim BFL Lightweight Championship (One time, current)
    - One successful title defense

== Mixed martial arts record ==
Professional record breakdown
30 matches	22 wins	7 losses
By knockout	7	3
By submission	3	0
By decision	12	4
No contests	1	

Res.	Record	Opponent	Method	Event	Date	Round	Time	Location	Notes
Win	22–7 (1)	Guram Kutateladze	Decision (unanimous)	Vault Fighting League 1	September 12, 2026	3	5:00	Dubai, United Arab Emirates	
Win	21–7 (1)	Nic Ouellet	Decision (unanimous)	Battlefield Fight League 85	October 16, 2025	5	5:00	Vancouver, British Columbia, Canada	Defended the interim BFL Lightweight Championship.
Win	20–7 (1)	Jeremy Henry	Technical Submission (rear-naked choke)	Battlefield Fight League 84	September 4, 2025	4	3:33	Vancouver, British Columbia, Canada	Return to Lightweight. Won the interim BFL Lightweight Championship.
Loss	19–7 (1)	Ádám Borics	Decision (majority)	PFL 5 (2025)	June 12, 2025	3	5:00	Nashville, Tennessee, United States	2025 PFL Featherweight Tournament Alternate bout.
Loss	19–6 (1)	Movlid Khaybulaev	Decision (split)	PFL 1 (2025)	April 3, 2025	3	5:00	Orlando, Florida, United States	2025 PFL Featherweight Tournament Quarterfinal.
Loss	19–5 (1)	Gabriel Alves Braga	Decision (unanimous)	PFL 10 (2024)	November 29, 2024	3	5:00	Riyadh, Saudi Arabia	
Loss	19–4 (1)	Patrício Pitbull	TKO (knees and punches)	Bellator Champions Series 1	March 22, 2024	3	4:07	Belfast, Northern Ireland	For the Bellator Featherweight World Championship.
Win	19–3 (1)	Pedro Carvalho	Decision (unanimous)	Bellator 291	February 25, 2023	3	5:00	Dublin, Ireland	
Win	18–3 (1)	Aaron Pico	TKO (shoulder injury)	Bellator 286	October 1, 2022	1	5:00	Long Beach, California, United States	
Win	17–3 (1)	Emmanuel Sanchez	Decision (unanimous)	Bellator 272	December 3, 2021	3	5:00	Uncasville, Connecticut, United States	
Loss	16–3 (1)	Ádám Borics	Decision (unanimous)	Bellator 256	April 9, 2021	3	5:00	Uncasville, Connecticut, United States	
Win	16–2 (1)	Matt Bessette	Decision (unanimous)	Bellator 253	November 19, 2020	3	5:00	Uncasville, Connecticut, United States	
NC	15–2 (1)	Daniel Pineda	NC (overturned)	PFL 8 (2019)	October 17, 2019	1	4:00	Las Vegas, Nevada, United States	2019 PFL Featherweight Tournament Semifinal. Originally a Submission (guillotine choke) win for Pineda; overturned after he tested positive for a banned substance.
Win	15–2	Luis Rafael Laurentino	TKO (punches)	PFL 8 (2019)	October 17, 2019	2	1:24	Las Vegas, Nevada, United States	2019 PFL Featherweight Tournament Quarterfinal.
Win	14–2	Steven Siler	Decision (unanimous)	PFL 5 (2019)	July 25, 2019	3	5:00	Atlantic City, New Jersey, United States	
Loss	13–2	Luis Rafael Laurentino	TKO (punches)	PFL 2 (2019)	May 23, 2019	1	0:23	Uniondale, New York, United States	
Win	13–1	Marat Magomedov	TKO (punches)	Brave CF 21	December 28, 2018	3	1:08	Jeddah, Saudi Arabia	
Win	12–1	Danyel Pilo	KO (elbows)	Brave CF 14	August 18, 2018	1	2:02	Tangier, Morocco	
Loss	11–1	Alexander Volkanovski	TKO (punches and elbows)	UFC 221	February 11, 2018	2	4:57	Perth, Australia	
Win	11–0	Kyle Bochniak	Decision (unanimous)	UFC on Fox: Weidman vs. Gastelum	July 22, 2017	3	5:00	Uniondale, New York, United States	
Win	10–0	Rony Jason	Decision (unanimous)	UFC Fight Night: Belfort vs. Gastelum	March 11, 2017	3	5:00	Fortaleza, Brazil	
Win	9–0	Alessandro Ricci	Decision (unanimous)	UFC on Fox: Maia vs. Condit	August 27, 2016	3	5:00	Vancouver, British Columbia, Canada	Lightweight bout.
Win	8–0	Drew Brokenshire	Decision (unanimous)	Battlefield Fight League 43	March 7, 2016	3	5:00	Coquitlam, British Columbia, Canada	
Win	7–0	Mario Pereira	Decision (unanimous)	Battlefield Fight League 34	January 24, 2015	5	5:00	Richmond, British Columbia, Canada	Won the BFL Featherweight Championship.
Win	6–0	Andre da Silva	Submission (rear-naked choke)	Battlefield Fight League 32	August 23, 2014	2	3:15	Richmond, British Columbia, Canada	Featherweight debut.
Win	5–0	Matthew Middleton	Submission (Peruvian necktie)	Chiang Mai FC 4	July 26, 2014	1	2:35	Chiang Mai, Thailand	Lightweight debut.
Win	4–0	Viktor Larsson	TKO (punches)	Songkran MMA Festival	April 12, 2014	2	0:00	Hua Hin, Thailand	Catchweight (150 lb) bout.
Win	3–0	Natthapol Thanaruethai	KO (punches)	Chiang Mai FC 2	March 7, 2014	1	3:58	Chiang Mai, Thailand	
Win	2–0	Blake Shearing	TKO (doctor stoppage)	Fivestar Fight League 10	November 8, 2013	2	2:11	Grand Prairie, Alberta, Canada	Catchweight (150 lbs) bout.
Win	1–0	Dan Lin	Decision (unanimous)	Battlefield Fight League 24	June 8, 2013	3	5:00	Penticton, British Columbia, Canada	Bantamweight debut.

== See also ==
- List of male mixed martial artists
- List of Canadian UFC fighters
