= 2026 in Professional Fighters League =

Information
- Promotion: Professional Fighters League
- First date: February 7, 2026

The year 2026 will be the 8th year in the history of the Professional Fighters League (PFL), a mixed martial arts promotion based in the United States.

== Events list ==
| # | Event | Date | Venue | Location | Ref. |
|---|---|---|---|---|---|
| 1 | PFL Dubai: Nurmagomedov vs. Davis | Feb 7, 2026 | Coca-Cola Arena | Dubai, United Arab Emirates | |
| 2 | PFL Madrid: van Steenis vs. Edwards 2 | Mar 20, 2026 | Palacio Vistalegre | Madrid, Spain | |
| 3 | PFL Pittsburgh: Eblen vs. Battle | Mar 28, 2026 | UPMC Events Center | Moon Township, Pennsylvania, United States | |
| 4 | PFL Africa 1: Pretoria | Apr 10, 2026 | SunBet Arena | Pretoria, South Africa | |
| 5 | PFL Chicago: Pettis vs. McKee | Apr 11, 2026 | Wintrust Arena | Chicago, Illinois, United States | |
| 6 | PFL Belfast: Kelly vs. Wilson | Apr 16, 2026 | SSE Arena | Belfast, Northern Ireland | |
| 7 | PFL Sioux Falls: Storley vs. Zendeli | May 2, 2026 | Sanford Pentagon | Sioux Falls, South Dakota, United States | |
| 9 | PFL Brussels: Habirora vs. Henderson | May 23, 2026 | ING Arena | Brussels, Belgium | |
| 10 | PFL MENA 9: Pride of Arabia | May 24, 2026 | Coca-Cola Arena | Dubai, United Arab Emirates | |
| 11 | PFL Africa 2: Nigeria | Jun 13, 2026 | Eko Convention Center | Lagos, Nigeria | |
| 12 | PFL San Diego: McKee vs. Isbulaev | Jun 27, 2026 | Pechanga Arena | San Diego, California, United States | |
| 13 | PFL MENA 10: No Fear, No Mercy | Jul 10, 2026 | Boulevard City | Riyadh, Saudi Arabia | |
| 14 | PFL Austin: Eblen vs. Kasanganay 2 | Jul 18, 2026 | Moody Center | Austin, Texas, United States | |
| 15 | PFL Washington DC: Jean vs. Rodriguez | Jul 25, 2026 | CareFirst Arena | Washington, D.C., United States | |
| 16 | PFL New York: Nurmagomedov vs. Colgan | Jul 31, 2026 | UBS Arena | Elmont, New York, United States | |
| 17 | PFL Charlotte: Battle vs. Rosta | Aug 7, 2026 | Bojangles Coliseum | Charlotte, North Carolina, United States | |
| 18 | PFL Tampa: Cyborg vs. Vieira | Aug 22, 2026 | Benchmark International Arena | Tampa, Florida, United States | |
| 19 | PFL MENA 11: Last Man Standing | Oct 2, 2026 | Boulevard City | Riyadh, Saudi Arabia | |
| 20 | PFL Africa 3: Morocco | Oct 10, 2026 | Mohammed V Sports Complex | Casablanca, Morocco | |
| 21 | PFL Chicago: Carmouche vs. Bishop 2 | Oct 17, 2026 | Wintrust Arena | Chicago, Illinois, United States | |
| 22 | PFL Dubai: Nemkov vs. Bilostenniy | Nov 14, 2026 | Coca-Cola Arena | Dubai, United Arab Emirates | |
| 23 | PFL Lyon: Lapilus vs. McKee | Dec 19, 2026 | LDLC Arena | Lyon, France | |

== Title fights ==
Title fights in 2026
| Weight class | | | | Method | Round | Time | Event | Notes |
|---|---|---|---|---|---|---|---|---|
| Welterweight | Ramazan Kuramagomedov | def. | Shamil Musaev | Decision (majority) (46–46, 48–46, 48–46) | 5 | 5:00 | PFL Champions Series 5 | (Note: For the inaugural PFL Welterweight World Championship.) |
| Lightweight | Usman Nurmagomedov (c) | def. | Alfie Davis | Technical Submission (rear arm-triangle choke) | 3 | 4:41 | PFL Champions Series 5 | (Note: For the PFL Lightweight World Championship.) |
| Middleweight | Costello van Steenis (c) | def. | Fabian Edwards | KO (elbows) | 3 | 1:48 | PFL Champions Series 6 | (Note: For the PFL Middleweight World Championship.) |
| Middleweight | Johnny Eblen | def. | Impa Kasanganay | TKO (elbow and punches) | 2 | 2:39 | PFL Austin | (Note: For the interim PFL Middleweight World Championship.) |
| Welterweight | Thad Jean | def. | Ernesto Rodriguez | TKO (punches) | 3 | 2:44 | PFL Washington DC | (Note: For the vacant PFL Welterweight World Championship.) |
| Lightweight | Usman Nurmagomedov (c) | def. | Archie Colgan | TKO (punches) | 1 | 3:42 | PFL New York | (Note: For the PFL Lightweight World Championship.) |
| Women's Featherweight | Cris Cyborg (c) | def. | Ketlen Vieira | Decision (unanimous) (49–46, 48–47, 49–46) | 5 | 5:00 | PFL Tampa | (Note: For the PFL Women's Featherweight World Championship.) |
| Featherweight | Razhabali Shaydullaev | def. | A.J. McKee | Decision (unanimous) (30–27, 30–27, 30–27) | 3 | 5:00 | Super Rizin 5 | (Note: For the inaugural PFL Featherweight World Championship.) |
| Women's Flyweight | Jena Bishop | def. | Liz Carmouche | Decision (unanimous) (48–47, 48–47, 48–47) | 5 | 5:00 | PFL Chicago 2 | (Note: For the inaugural PFL Women's Flyweight World Championship.) |
| Heavyweight | Vadim Nemkov (c) | vs. | Sergey Bilostenniy | | | | PFL Dubai 2 | (Note: For the PFL Heavyweight World Championship.) |
| Bantamweight | Taylor Lapilus | vs. | Mitchell McKee | | | | PFL Lyon | (Note: For the inaugural PFL Bantamweight World Championship.) |

== 2026 PFL Africa Tournament ==
=== 2026 PFL Africa Welterweight Tournament ===
Quarter-finals
(Angola) Shido Boris Esperança | TKO
(Cameroon) Emilios Dassi | 1
(South Africa) Peace Nguphane | UD
(Guinea-Bissau) Yabna N'Tchalá | 3
(Guinea-Bissau) Rivaldo Pereira (Note: Eliezer Kubanza withdrew from the tournament and was replaced by Rivaldo Pereira.) | TKO
(Nigeria) Kunle Lawal | 1
(Nigeria) David Samuel | SUB
(Egypt) Abdelrahman Mohamed | 1

Semi-finals
(Angola) Shido Boris Esperança | TKO
(South Africa) Peace Nguphane | 1
(Guinea-Bissau) Rivaldo Pereira | 3
(Nigeria) David Samuel | UD

Final
(Angola) Shido Boris Esperança
(Nigeria) David Samuel

=== 2026 PFL Africa Lightweight Tournament ===
Quarter-finals
(Nigeria) Patrick Ocheme | KO
(Cameroon) Ayinda Octave | 1
(Angola) Áureo Cruz (Note: Tshilomba Mikixi withdrew from the tournament and was replaced by Áureo Cruz.) | 3
(Nigeria) Cornel Thompson | UD
(Senegal) Demba Seck | UD
(Benin) Jean Do Santos | 3
(Chad) Hussain Al Kurdi | SUB
(Morocco) Abderrahman Errachidy | 2

Semi-finals
(Nigeria) Patrick Ocheme | KO
(Nigeria) Cornel Thompson | 1
(Senegal) Demba Seck | NC (Note: Accidental knee to the groin rendered Seck unable to continue; the judge picked him advanced to the final. .)
(Chad) Hussain Al Kurdi | 1

Final
(Nigeria) Patrick Ocheme
(Chad) Hussain Al Kurdi (Note: Demba Seck pulled out from the tournament for unknown reasons and was replaced by Hussain Al Kurdi.)

=== 2026 PFL Africa Bantamweight Tournament ===
Quarter-finals
(Tanzania) Dauda Rajabu | 2
(Angola) Boule Godogo | TKO
(Cameroon) Alain Majorique | 3
(Liberia) Dwight Joseph | SD
(Nigeria) Raphael Uchegbu | UD
(Mozambique) Edson Machavane | 3
(South Africa) Thimna Mhlauli | 1
(Algeria) Karim Henniene | SUB

Semi-finals
(Angola) Boule Godogo | 3
(Liberia) Dwight Joseph | SD
(Nigeria) Raphael Uchegbu (Note: Karim Henniene withdrew from the tournament and was replaced by Alain Majorique, who in turn missed weight. Therefore Raphael Uchegbu advanced to final.) | BYE
(Cameroon) Alain Majorique | –

Final
(Liberia) Dwight Joseph
(Nigeria) Raphael Uchegbu

== 2026 PFL MENA Tournament ==
=== 2026 PFL MENA Welterweight Tournament ===
Quarter-finals
(Egypt) Yousef Adel | 3
(Morocco) Badreddine Diani | UD
(Lebanon) Hassan Shaaban | 3
(Jordan) Hazem Kayyali | UD
(Morocco) Wissame Akhmouch | 2
(Algeria) Abdelkrim Zouad | SUB
(Egypt) Ahmad Abdelbast Darwish | 2
(Palestine) Omar Hussein | TKO

Semi-finals
(Morocco) Badreddine Diani | SUB
(Jordan) Hazem Kayyali | 2
(Algeria) Abdelkrim Zouad | UD
(Palestine) Omar Hussein | 3

Final
(Morocco) Badreddine Diani
(Algeria) Abdelkrim Zouad

=== 2026 PFL MENA Lightweight Tournament ===
Quarter-finals
(Morocco) Salah Eddine Hamli | 1
(Algeria) Ylies Djiroun | TKO
(Egypt) Basel Shalaan | UD
(Kuwait) Abdullah Saleem | 3
(Egypt) Assem Ghanem | –
(Iraq) Mohammad Fahmi | BYE (Note: Assem Ghanem has suffered an injury during the event, therefore Fahmi advanced to semifinal.)
(Egypt) Ahmed El Sisy | SD
(Iraq) Harda Karim | 3

Semi-finals
(Algeria) Ylies Djiroun | TKO
(Egypt) Assem Ghanem (Note: Basel Shalaan missed weight, and was replaced by Assem Ghanem.) | 1
(Iraq) Mohammad Fahmi | UD
(Egypt) Ahmed El Sisy | 3

Final
(Algeria) Ylies Djiroun
(Iraq) Mohammad Fahmi

=== 2026 PFL MENA Featherweight Tournament ===
Quarter-finals
(Morocco) Taha Bendaoud | 3
(Bahrain) Hamza Kooheji | UD
(Algeria) Elias Boudegzdame | SUB
(Iraq) Hussein Salem | 1
(Egypt) Ahmed Tarek | 3
(Syria) Shadi Kabbani (Note: Rachid El Hazoume withdrew from the tournament and was replaced by Shadi Kabbani.) | UD
(United Arab Emirates) Mohammad Yahya | 3
(Tunisia) Mehdi Saadi | SD

Semi-finals
(Egypt) Islam Youssef | –
(Algeria) Elias Boudegzdame (Note: Hamza Kooheji withdrew from the tournament and was replaced by Islam Youssef, who in turn was unable to compete due to visa issues. Therefore Elias Boudegzdame advanced to final.) | BYE
(Syria) Shadi Kabbani | 3
(Tunisia) Mehdi Saadi | SD

Final
(Algeria) Elias Boudegzdame
(Tunisia) Mehdi Saadi

== See also ==
- List of current PFL fighters
- 2026 in UFC
- 2026 in ONE Championship
- 2026 in Absolute Championship Akhmat
- 2026 in Konfrontacja Sztuk Walki
- 2026 in Legacy Fighting Alliance
- 2026 in Rizin Fighting Federation
- 2026 in LUX Fight League
- 2026 in Oktagon MMA
- 2026 in Cage Warriors
- 2026 in Brave Combat Federation
- 2026 in UAE Warriors
