= 2024 in Bellator MMA =

Mixed martial arts events

Information
- Promotion: Bellator MMA
- First date: February 24, 2024
- Last date: September 14, 2024

Events
- Total events: 6

Fights
- Total fights: 63
- Title fights: 5

2024 in Bellator MMA was the sixteenth and final year in the history of Bellator MMA, a mixed martial arts promotion based in the United States.

== Events list ==
#	Event	Date	Venue	City	Country	Ref.
313	Bellator Champions Series 5: McCourt vs. Collins	September 14, 2024	OVO Arena Wembley	London	England	
312	Bellator Champions Series 4: Nurmagomedov vs. Shabliy	September 7, 2024	Pechanga Arena	San Diego, California	United States	
311	Bellator Champions Series 3: Jackson vs. Kuramagomedov	June 22, 2024	3Arena	Dublin	Ireland	
310	Bellator Champions Series 2: Mix vs. Magomedov 2	May 17, 2024	Accor Arena	Paris	France	
309	Bellator Champions Series 1: Anderson vs. Moore	March 22, 2024	SSE Arena	Belfast	Northern Ireland	
308	PFL vs. Bellator	February 24, 2024	Kingdom Arena	Riyadh	Saudi Arabia	

== Title fights ==
Title fights in 2024
Weight class				Method	Round	Time	Event	Notes
Featherweight	Patrício Pitbull (c)	def.	Jeremy Kennedy	TKO (knees and punches)	3	4:07	Bellator Champions Series 1	(Note: For the Bellator Featherweight World Championship.)
Light Heavyweight	Corey Anderson	def.	Karl Moore	Decision (unanimous) (49–46, 49–46, 50–45)	5	5:00	Bellator Champions Series 1	(Note: For the vacant Bellator Light Heavyweight World Championship.)
Bantamweight	Patchy Mix (c)	def.	Magomed Magomedov	Decision (split) (46–49, 48–47, 48–47)	5	5:00	Bellator Champions Series 2	(Note: For the Bellator Bantamweight World Championship.)
Welterweight	Ramazan Kuramagomedov	def.	Jason Jackson (c)	Decision (unanimous) (48–47, 48–47, 48–47)	5	5:00	Bellator Champions Series 3	(Note: For the Bellator Welterweight World Championship.)
Lightweight	Usman Nurmagomedov (c)	def.	Alexandr Shabliy	Decision (unanimous) (50–45, 49–46, 49–46)	5	5:00	Bellator Champions Series 4	(Note: For the Bellator Lightweight World Championship.)
Middleweight	Johnny Eblen (c)	def.	Fabian Edwards	Decision (unanimous) (48–47, 48–47, 48–47)	5	5:00	PFL Super Fights: Battle of the Giants	(Note: For the Bellator Middleweight World Championship.)

== See also ==
- List of Bellator MMA events
- List of current Bellator MMA fighters
- 2024 in UFC
- 2024 in Professional Fighters League
- 2024 in ONE Championship
- 2024 in Absolute Championship Akhmat
- 2024 in Konfrontacja Sztuk Walki
- 2024 in Rizin Fighting Federation
- 2024 in Oktagon MMA
- 2024 in Brave Combat Federation
- 2024 in UAE Warriors
- 2024 in Legacy Fighting Alliance
- 2024 in Cage Warriors
