= PFL Rankings =

Athletic rankings

Professional Fighter League (PFL) rankings, which were introduced in January 2026, are generated by a voting panel made up of media members. These media members are asked to vote for whom they feel are the top fighters in the PFL by weight class and pound-for-pound. A fighter is only eligible to be voted on if they are of active status in the PFL. A fighter can appear in more than one weight division at a time. The champion and interim champion are considered to be in top positions of their respective divisions and therefore are not eligible for voting by weight class. However, the champions can be voted on for the pound-for-pound rankings.

== Legend ==
Legend
▲ +1	Move up
Steady	No change
▼ −1	Move down
New entry	Not previously ranked

== Men's rankings ==
=== Men's pound-for-pound ===
Rankings updated on October 27, 2026, after PFL Chicago.

Rank	ISO	Fighter	Record	Win streak	M	Weight class	Status	Next fight	
Rank	ISO	Fighter	Record	Win streak	M	Weight class	Status	Event	Opponent
1	(Russia)	Usman Nurmagomedov	22–0 (1 NC)	22	Steady	Lightweight	Lightweight Champion		
2	(Russia)	Vadim Nemkov	20–2 (1 NC)	14	Steady	Heavyweight	Heavyweight Champion	PFL Dubai	Sergey Bilostenniy
3	(United States)	Corey Anderson	20–6 (1 NC)	4	Steady	Light Heavyweight	Light Heavyweight Champion		
4	(Spain)	Costello van Steenis	18–3	4	Steady	Middleweight	Middleweight Champion		
5	(Haiti)	Thad Jean	12–0	12	Steady	Welterweight	Welterweight Champion		
6	(United States)	A.J. McKee	25–3	0	Steady	Featherweight	#2 in featherweight rankings		
7	(United States)	Johnny Eblen	18–1	2	Steady	Middleweight	Interim Middleweight Champion		
8	(Russia)	Shamil Musaev	20–1–1	0	Steady	Welterweight	#1 in welterweight rankings		
9	(Russia)	Timur Khizriev	19–0	19	Steady	Featherweight	#1 in featherweight rankings		
10	(Republic of Ireland)	Paul Hughes	14–3	0	Steady	Lightweight	#6 in lightweight rankings		

=== Heavyweight ===
Weight limit: 206 to 265 lb • 93.44 kg to 120.20 kg

Rankings updated on October 27, 2026, after PFL Chicago.

Rank	ISO	Fighter	Record	M	Win streak	Last fight			Next fight	
Rank	ISO	Fighter	Record	M	Win streak	Result	Event	Opponent	Event	Opponent
C	(Russia)	Vadim Nemkov	20–2 (1 NC)	Steady	14 (0 def)	Win	PFL Champions Series 4	Renan Ferreira	PFL Dubai	Sergey Bilostenniy
1	(Russia)	Oleg Popov	23–2	Steady	4	Win	BetCity Fight Nights 135	Magomed Magomedov	TBD	
2	(Russia)	Denis Goltsov	37–9	Steady	1	Win	PFL Charlotte	Hasan Mezhiev	PFL Dubai	Maxwell Djantou Nana
3	(Russia)	Sergey Bilostenniy	15–4	Steady	1	Win	PFL Sioux Falls	Renan Ferreira	PFL Dubai	Vadim Nemkov
4	(Moldova)	Alexander Romanov	22–4 (1 NC)	Steady	3	Win	PFL Chicago	Rodrigo Nascimento	TBD	
5	(Cameroon)	Maxwell Djantou Nana	9–2	▲ +1	2	Win	PFL Charlotte	Eduardo Neves	PFL Dubai	Denis Goltsov
6	(Brazil)	Jose Augusto	11–6	▲ +1	0	Loss	PFL Madrid	Linton Vassell	TBD	
7	(Brazil)	Eduardo Neves	9–4	▲ +2	0	Loss	PFL Charlotte	Maxwell Djantou Nana	TBD	

=== Light Heavyweight ===
Weight limit: 186 to 205 lbs • 84.36 to 92.98 kg

Rankings updated on October 27, 2026, after PFL Chicago.

Rank	ISO	Fighter	Record	M	Win streak	Last fight			Next fight	
Rank	ISO	Fighter	Record	M	Win streak	Result	Event	Opponent	Event	Opponent
C	(United States)	Corey Anderson	20–6 (1 NC)	Steady	4 (0 def)	Win	PFL Champions Series 3	Dovletdzhan Yagshimuradov	TBD	
1	(Brazil)	Antônio Carlos Júnior	19–6 (2 NC)	Steady	3	Win	PFL 10	Sullivan Cauley	TBD	
3	(England)	Luke Trainer	11–1	Steady	6	Win	PFL Tampa	Roland Dunlap	TBD	
2	(England)	Simeon Powell	13–2	Steady	2	Win	PFL Charlotte	Dovletdzhan Yagshimuradov	TBD	
4	(Turkmenistan)	Dovletdzhan Yagshimuradov	26–9–1	Steady	0	Loss	PFL Charlotte	Simeon Powell	TBD	
5	(Bahrain)	Rasul Magomedov	10–0	Steady	10	Win	PFL Washington DC	Sullivan Cauley	TBD	
6	(United States)	Sullivan Cauley	8–3	▲ +1	0	Loss	PFL Washington DC	Rasul Magomedov	TBD	
7	(Germany)	Rafael Xavier	15–9	▲ +1	1	Win	PFL Washington DC	Tyson Pedro	TBD	
8	(Argentina)	Emiliano Sordi	27–14–1	▲ +1	1	Win	PFL Chicago 2	Abraham Bably	TBD	
9	(Senegal)	Moustapha Diakhaté	6–0–1	▲ +1	2	Win	PFL New York	Darryl Walker	TBD	
10	(Australia)	Tyson Pedro	10–7	New entry	0	Loss	PFL Washington DC	Rafael Xavier	TBD	

=== Middleweight ===
Weight limit: 171 to 185 lb • 77.56 to 83.91 kg

Rankings updated on October 27, 2026, after PFL Chicago.

Rank	ISO	Fighter	Record	M	Win streak	Last fight			Next fight	
Rank	ISO	Fighter	Record	M	Win streak	Result	Event	Opponent	Event	Opponent
C	(Spain)	Costello van Steenis	18–3	Steady	4 (1 def)	Win	PFL Madrid	Fabian Edwards	TBD	
IC	(United States)	Johnny Eblen	18–1	Steady	2	Win	PFL Austin	Impa Kasanganay	TBD	
2	(England)	Fabian Edwards	16–5 (1 NC)	Steady	0	Loss	PFL Madrid	Costello van Steenis	TBD	
3	(United States)	Impa Kasanganay	20–7	Steady	0	Loss	PFL Austin	Johnny Eblen	TBD	
4	(United States)	Bryan Battle	13–3 (1 NC)	Steady	1	Win	PFL Charlotte	Dalton Rosta	TBD	
5	(Belgium)	Boris Mbarga Atangana	9–0	Steady	9	Win	PFL Brussels	Jared Gooden	TBD	
6	(Canada)	Aaron Jeffery	17–6	Steady	1	Win	PFL Charlotte	Joshua Silveira	TBD	
7	(United States)	Dalton Rosta	11–4	Steady	0	Loss	PFL Charlotte	Bryan Battle	TBD	
8	(United States)	Josh Fremd	13–6	Steady	2	Win	PFL Charlotte	Jhony Gregory	TBD	
9	(United States)	Joshua Silveira	15–6	Steady	0	Loss	PFL Charlotte	Aaron Jeffery	TBD	
10	(Brazil)	Jhony Gregory	11–5	Steady	0	Win	PFL Charlotte	Josh Fremd	TBD	

=== Welterweight ===
Weight limit: 156 to 170 lb • 70.76 to 77.11 kg

Rankings updated on October 27, 2026, after PFL Chicago.

Rank	ISO	Fighter	Record	M	Win streak	Last fight			Next fight	
Rank	ISO	Fighter	Record	M	Win streak	Result	Event	Opponent	Event	Opponent
C	(Haiti)	Thad Jean	12–0	Steady	12	Win	PFL Washington DC	Ernesto Rodriguez	TBD	
1	(Russia)	Shamil Musaev	20–1–1	Steady	0	Loss	PFL Dubai	Ramazan Kuramagomedov	TBD	
2	(Russia)	Magomed Umalatov	18–1	Steady	1	Win	PFL 5	Anthony Ivy	TBD	
3	(France)	Abdoul Abdouraguimov	20–1 (1 NC)	Steady	10	Win	PFL Dubai	Kendly St. Louis	TBD	
4	(Belgium)	Patrick Habirora	9–0	Steady	9	Win	PFL Brussels	Benson Henderson	TBD	
5	(Egypt)	Omar El Dafrawy	16–6	Steady	2	Win	PFL New York	Jonathan Piersma	TBD	
6	(Albania)	Florim Zendeli	11–2–1	Steady	0	Loss	PFL Sioux Falls	Logan Storley	TBD	
7	(Cuba)	Ernesto Rodriguez	11–1	Steady	0	Loss	PFL Pittsburgh	Thad Jean	PFL Dubai	Rhys McKee
8	(Democratic Republic of the Congo)	Eliezer Kubanza	9–1	Steady	3	Win	PFL Chicago 2	Trey Waters	TBD	
9	(Republic of Ireland)	Eoin Sheridan	6–0	Steady	6	Win	PFL Tampa	James Vake	TBD	
10	(France)	Cédric Doumbé	6–1	Steady	1	Win	Bellator Champions Series 2	Jaleel Willis	TBD	

=== Lightweight ===
Weight limit: 146 to 155 lb • 66.22 to 70.30 kg

Rankings updated on October 27, 2026, after PFL Chicago.

Rank	ISO	Fighter	Record	M	Win streak	Last fight			Next fight	
Rank	ISO	Fighter	Record	M	Win streak	Result	Event	Opponent	Event	Opponent
C	(Russia)	Usman Nurmagomedov	22–0 (1 NC)	Steady	22 (2 def)	Win	PFL New York	Archie Colgan	TBD	
1	(Russia)	Alexandr Shabliy	25–4	Steady	1	Win	PFL San Diego	Alfie Davis	TBD	
2	(Russia)	Gadzhi Rabadanov	28–5–2	Steady	2	Win	PFL Tampa	Tracy Reeder	TBD	
3	(England)	Alfie Davis	20–7–1	Steady	0	Loss	PFL San Diego	Alexandr Shabliy	TBD	
4	(United States)	Archie Colgan	13–1	Steady	0	Loss	PFL New York	Usman Nurmagomedov	TBD	
5	(Poland)	Jakub Kaszuba	16–0	Steady	16	Win	PFL Pittsburgh	Natan Schulte	TBD	
6	(Republic of Ireland)	Paul Hughes	14–3	Steady	0	Loss	PFL Champions Series 3	Usman Nurmagomedov	TBD	
7	(New Zealand)	Jay-Jay Wilson	12–2	Steady	0	Win	PFL Belfast	Darragh Kelly	TBD	
8	(Brazil)	Natan Schulte	26–6–1	Steady	1	Win	PFL Tampa	Makkasharip Zaynukov	TBD	
9	(Russia)	Amru Magomedov	11–0	Steady	11	Win	PFL New York	Angel Alvarez	TBD	
10	(Republic of Ireland)	Darragh Kelly	9–1	Steady	0	Loss	PFL Belfast	Jay-Jay Wilson	TBD	

=== Featherweight ===
Weight limit: 136 to 145 lb • 61.68 to 65.77 kg

Rankings updated on October 27, 2026, after PFL Chicago.

Rank	ISO	Fighter	Record	M	Win streak	Last fight			Next fight	
Rank	ISO	Fighter	Record	M	Win streak	Result	Event	Opponent	Event	Opponent
C	(Kyrgyzstan)	Razhabali Shaydullaev	20-0	Steady	20	Win	Super Rizin 5	A.J. McKee	TBD	
1	(United States)	A.J. McKee	25–3	Steady	0	Loss	Super Rizin 5	Razhabali Shaydullaev	TBD	
2	(Russia)	Timur Khizriev	19–0	Steady	19	Win	PFL Chicago 2	Gabriel Braga	TBD	
3	(Peru)	Jesus Pinedo	26–8–1	Steady	0	Win	PFL Austin	Joey Ruquet	TBD	
4	(Kazakhstan)	Salamat Isbulaev	10–1	Steady	1	Loss	PFL San Diego	A.J. McKee	TBD	
5	(Brazil)	Gabriel Braga	17–4	Steady	0	Loss	PFL Chicago 2	Timur Khizriev	TBD	
6	(England)	Ibragim Ibragimov	10–0	Steady	10	Win	PFL Europe 2	Mathys Duragrin	TBD	
7	(Hungary)	Ádám Borics	20–4	Steady	0	Loss	PFL Madrid	A.J. McKee	TBD	
8	(France)	Asaël Adjoudj	11–1	Steady	11	Win	PFL Brussels	Keisuke Sasu	TBD	
9	(United States)	Alexei Pergande	8–0	Steady	8	Win	PFL Pittsburgh	Julio Arce	TBD	
10	(Russia)	Khasan Magomedsharipov	11–0	Steady	11	Win	PFL San Diego	Joshua Weems	TBD	

=== Bantamweight ===
Weight limit: 126 to 135 lbs • 57.15 to 61.23 kg

Rankings updated on October 27, 2026, after PFL Chicago.

Rank	ISO	Fighter	Record	M	Win streak	Last fight			Next fight	
Rank	ISO	Fighter	Record	M	Win streak	Result	Event	Opponent	Event	Opponent
C									TBD	
1	(United States)	Mitch McKee	11–0	Steady	11	Win	PFL Chicago	Sergio Pettis	PFL Lyon	Taylor Lapilus
2	(Russia)	Renat Khavalov	12–0	Steady	12	Win	PFL Chicago	Raufeon Stots	TBD	
3	(France)	Taylor Lapilus	25–4	Steady	6	Win	PFL Brussels	Jake Hadley	PFL Lyon	Mitch McKee
4	(United States)	Sergio Pettis	25–8	Steady	0	Loss	PFL Chicago	Mitch McKee	TBD	
5	(Cuba)	Lazaro Dayron	11–0–1	Steady	12	Win	PFL New York	Raufeon Stots	TBD	
6	(Tajikistan)	Sarvarjon Khamidov	18–1	Steady	2	Win	PFL Chicago 2	Rafael do Nascimento	TBD	
7	(Russia)	Magomed Magomedov	22–6	Steady	0	Loss	PFL Tampa	Daniel Marcos	TBD	
8	(Brazil)	Marcirley Alves	15–6	Steady	0	Loss	PFL Tampa	Nkosi Ndebele	TBD	
9	(Afghanistan)	Javid Basharat	16–2 (1)	Steady	2	Win	PFL Tampa	Movsar Ibragimov	TBD	
10	(Peru)	Daniel Marcos	19–1 (1)	Steady	2	Win	PFL Tampa	Magomed Magomedov	TBD	

== Women's rankings ==
=== Women's Flyweight ===
Weight limit: 116 to 125 lb • 52.61 to 56.69 kg

Rankings updated on October 27, 2026, after PFL Chicago.

Rank	ISO	Fighter	Record	M	Win streak	Last fight			Next fight	
Rank	ISO	Fighter	Record	M	Win streak	Result	Event	Opponent	Event	Opponent
C	(United States)	Jena Bishop	12–3	Steady	3	Win	PFL Chicago 2	Liz Carmouche	TBD	
1	(England)	Dakota Ditcheva	16–0	Steady	16	Win	PFL New York	Denise Kielholtz	TBD	
2	(United States)	Liz Carmouche	26–9	Steady	0	Loss	PFL Chicago 2	Jena Bishop	TBD	
3	(Brazil)	Taila Santos	23–5	Steady	0	Loss	PFL Tampa	Sabrinna de Sousa	TBD	
4	(Poland)	Paulina Wiśniewska	8–1	Steady	2	Win	PFL Chicago 2	Chelsea Hackett	TBD	
5	(Bahrain)	Sabrinna de Sousa	7–0	Steady	7	Win	PFL Tampa	Taila Santos	TBD	
6	(Netherlands)	Denise Kielholtz	9–6	Steady	0	Win	PFL New York	Dakota Ditcheva	TBD	
7	(Brazil)	Viviane Araújo	14–8	Steady	0	Loss	PFL San Diego	Liz Carmouche	TBD	
8	(Russia)	Tatiana Postarnakova	8–0	Steady	8	Win	PFL New York	Montana De La Rosa	TBD	
9	(Canada)	Shannon Clark	9–1	Steady	4	Win	PFL Chicago 2	Lucero Acosta	TBD	
10	(United States)	Cheyanne Bowers	8–3	Steady	1	Win	PFL Charlotte	Elora Dana	TBD	

== See also ==
- List of undefeated mixed martial artists
- List of current PFL fighters
- List of PFL champions
