= Bellator Champions Series 5 =

Mixed martial arts event in 2024

Bellator Champions Series 5: McCourt vs. Collins
- The poster for Bellator Champions Series 5: McCourt vs. Collins
- Promotion: Bellator MMA
- Date: September 14, 2024
- Venue: OVO Arena Wembley
- City: London, England

Event chronology
Bellator Champions Series 4: Nurmagomedov vs. Shabliy	Bellator Champions Series 5: McCourt vs. Collins

Bellator Champions Series 5: McCourt vs. Collins (also known as Bellator Champions Series London) was a mixed martial arts event produced by Bellator MMA that took place on September 14, 2024, at OVO Arena Wembley in London, England.

This is the last event to be promoted by Bellator MMA as the company ceased operations in January 2025.

== Background ==
The event marked the promotion's eighth visit to London and first since Bellator 281 in May 2022.

A Bellator Middleweight World Championship rematch between current champion Johnny Eblen and Fabian Edwards was expected to headline the event. The pairing previously met at Bellator 299 in September 2023, which Eblen won by third-round knockout. However on September 3, the bout was rescheduled for a later date with a women's featherweight title eliminator bout between Leah McCourt and Sara Collins served as the new main event.

A women's featherweight bout between Eman Almudhaf and Daiane Silva was removed from the event at the weigh-ins for unknown reasons.

== Results ==
Fight card (MAX / DAZN)
Weight class				Method	Round	Time	Notes
Women's Featherweight	Sara Collins	def.	Leah McCourt	Submission (rear-naked choke)	1	2:25	(Note: Bellator Women's Featherweight title eliminator.)
Light Heavyweight	Simeon Powell	def.	Rafael Xavier	Decision (split) (29–28, 28–29, 29–28)	3	5:00
Light Heavyweight	Luke Trainer	def.	Laurynas Urbonavicius	Submission (rear-naked choke)	1	4:15
Lightweight	Marc Diakiese	def.	Tim Wilde	Decision (unanimous) (29–28, 29–28, 29–28)	3	5:00
Preliminary card (MAX)
Lightweight	Archie Colgan	def.	Manoel Sousa	Decision (unanimous) (30–27, 29–28, 29–28)	3	5:00
Middleweight	Mike Shipman	def.	Eslam Abdul Baset	TKO (knee and punches)	2	2:32
Catchweight (175 lb)	Joseph Luciano	def.	Steven Hill	Submission (anaconda choke)	2	1:22
Catchweight (140 lb)	Ciarán Clarke	def.	Tuomas Grönvall	Decision (unanimous) (30–26, 30–26, 30–27)	3	5:00
Lightweight	Darragh Kelly	def.	Dmytrii Hrytsenko	Decision (unanimous) (30–26, 30–26, 30–26)	3	5:00

== See also ==
- 2024 in Bellator MMA
- List of Bellator MMA events
- List of current Bellator fighters
