= PFL Super Fights: Battle of the Giants =

Professional Fighters League MMA event in 2024

- The poster for PFL Super Fights: Battle of the Giants
- Promotion: Professional Fighters League
- Date: October 19, 2024
- Venue: The Mayadeen
- City: Riyadh, Saudi Arabia

Event chronology
| PFL Europe 3 | PFL Super Fights: Battle of the Giants | PFL 10 |

PFL Super Fights: Battle of the Giants was a mixed martial arts event produced by the Professional Fighters League that took place on October 19, 2024, at The Mayadeen in Riyadh, Saudi Arabia.

== Background ==
The event marked the promotion's fifth visit to Riyadh and first since PFL MENA 3 (2024) in September 2024.

A world heavyweight superfight title bout between former UFC Heavyweight Champion Francis Ngannou and 2023 PFL heavyweight winner Renan Ferreira headlined the event.

A women's world featherweight superfight title bout between the Bellator Women's Featherweight Champion (also former Invicta FC, Strikeforce and UFC Women's Featherweight Champion) Cris Cyborg and 2022 PFL Women's Lightweight and 2023 Featherweight winner Larissa Pacheco took place at the co-main event.

A Bellator World Middleweight Championship bout and rematch between champion Johnny Eblen and Fabian Edwards took place at this event. The pairing previously met at Bellator 299 in September 2023, which Eblen won by third-round knockout. The pairing was previously scheduled to meet at Bellator Champions Series 5, but the bout was rescheduled to this event.

A bantamweight bout between former interim Bellator Bantamweight Champion Raufeon Stots and Marcos Breno took place at the event. They were previously scheduled to meet at Bellator Champions Series 4, but the bout was removed from the event for unknown reasons.

== Results ==
Main card (ESPN+ PPV)
| Weight class | | | | Method | Round | Time | Notes |
|---|---|---|---|---|---|---|---|
| Heavyweight | Francis Ngannou | def. | Renan Ferreira | KO (punches) | 1 | 3:32 | (Note: For the inaugural PFL World Heavyweight Superfight Championship.) |
| Women's Featherweight | Cris Cyborg | def. | Larissa Pacheco | Decision (unanimous) (49–46, 49–46, 49–46) | 5 | 5:00 | (Note: For the inaugural PFL Women's World Featherweight Superfight Championship.) |
| Middleweight | Johnny Eblen (c) | def. | Fabian Edwards | Decision (unanimous) (48–47, 48–47, 48–47) | 5 | 5:00 | (Note: For the Bellator World Middleweight Championship.) |
| Featherweight | Husein Kadimagomaev | vs. | Zafar Mohsen | NC (overturned) | 3 | 5:00 | (Note: Originally a unanimous decision (30–27, 30–27, 30–27) win for Mohsen, overturned after he tested positive for banned substances.) |
| Lightweight | Paul Hughes | def. | A. J. McKee | Decision (split) (28–29, 29–28, 29–28) | 3 | 5:00 |
Preliminary card (ESPN+)
| Bantamweight | Raufeon Stots | def. | Marcos Breno | Submission (rear-naked choke) | 3 | 3:01 |
| Lightweight | Makkasharip Zaynukov | def. | Dedrek Sanders | Decision (unanimous) (30–26, 30–26, 30–26) | 3 | 5:00 |
| Featherweight | Ibragim Ibragimov | def. | Nacho Campos | Decision (unanimous) (30–27, 30–27, 30–27) | 3 | 5:00 |
| Featherweight | Taha Bendaoud | def. | Tariq Ismail | Submission (triangle choke) | 2 | 3:51 |

== Aftermath ==
On December 2, news surfaced that Mohsen had submitted a fight night drug test sample that was flagged positive, subsequently his win was overturned to a no contest and he was banned from competition for a year and fined an undisclosed amount.

== See also ==
- List of PFL events
- List of current PFL fighters
- Riyadh Season
