= Bellator Champions Series 4 =

Mixed martial arts event in 2024

Bellator Champions Series 4: Nurmagomedov vs. Shabliy
- The poster for Bellator Champions Series 4: Nurmagomedov vs. Shabliy
- Promotion: Bellator MMA
- Date: September 7, 2024
- Venue: Pechanga Arena
- City: San Diego, California, United States

Event chronology
Bellator Champions Series 3: Jackson vs. Kuramagomedov	Bellator Champions Series 4: Nurmagomedov vs. Shabliy	Bellator Champions Series 5: McCourt vs. Collins

Bellator Champions Series 4: Nurmagomedov vs. Shabliy (also known as Bellator Champions Series San Diego) was a mixed martial arts event produced by Bellator MMA that took place on September 7, 2024, at Pechanga Arena in San Diego, California, United States.

== Background ==
The event marked the promotion's third visit to San Diego and first since Bellator 300 in October 2023.

A Bellator Lightweight World Championship bout between current champion Usman Nurmagomedov and Alexandr Shabliy headlined the event. The pair was previously expected to headline at Bellator Champions Series 2, but Nurmagomedov withdrew from the event due to injury.

Roughly a two-week before the card there a fight changes made:

- On August 29, it was announced that two bouts between Raufeon Stots vs. Marcos Breno and Grant Neal vs. Khalid Murtazaliev were removed from the event for unknown reasons.
- Keri-Taylor Melandez was scheduled to face Sumiko Inaba in a women's flyweight bout, but she withdrew due to knee injury and was replaced by Mackenzie Stiller.

== Results ==
Fight card (MAX / DAZN)
Weight class				Method	Round	Time	Notes
Lightweight	Usman Nurmagomedov (c)	def.	Alexandr Shabliy	Decision (unanimous) (50–45, 49–46, 49–46)	5	5:00	(Note: For the Bellator Lightweight World Championship.)
Welterweight	Lorenz Larkin	def.	Levan Chokheli	KO (punches)	1	1:53	(Note: Bellator Welterweight title eliminator.)
Middleweight	Aaron Jeffery	def.	Douglas Lima	Decision (unanimous) (29–28, 29–28, 29–28)	3	5:00
Women's Flyweight	Sumiko Inaba	def.	Mackenzie Stiller	TKO (punches)	2	4:25
Lightweight	Jora Ayvazyan	def.	Yancy Medeiros	Decision (unanimous) (30–27, 30–27, 30–27)	3	5:00
Preliminary card (MAX)
Middleweight	Jordan Newman	def.	Imamshafi Aliev	Decision (unanimous) (30–27, 30–27, 30–27)	3	5:00
Welterweight	Masayuki Kikuiri	def.	Herman Terrado	TKO (body kick and punches)	3	2:54
Bantamweight	Bryce Meredith	def.	John MaCalolooy	Technical Submission (rear-naked choke)	1	3:15
Heavyweight	Josh Hokit	def.	Sean Rose	Submission (armbar)	1	4:58
Women's Strawweight	Ashley Thiner	def.	Aysia Cortez	TKO (punches)	2	3:11

== Reported payout ==
The following is the reported payout to the athletes as reported to the California State Athletic Commission (CSAC). It does not include any discretionary bonuses, side letter (LOA) agreement totals, or sponsorship pay.

- Usman Nurmagomedov: $100,000 (no win bonus) def. Alexander Shabliy: $50,000
- Lorenz Larkin: $100,000 (no win bonus) def. Levan Chokheli: $41,000
- Aaron Jeffery: $60,000 (includes $30,000 win bonus) def. Douglas Lima: $50,000
- Sumiko Inaba: $82,000 (includes $41,000 win bonus) def. Mackenzie Stiller: $13,000
- Jora Ayvazyan: $40,000 (includes $20,000 win bonus) def. Yancy Medeiros: $25,000
- Jordan Newman: $36,000 (includes $18,000 win bonus) def. Imamshafi Aliev: $30,000
- Masayuki Kikuiri: $26,000 (includes $13,000 win bonus) def. Herman Terrado: $7,500
- Bryce Meredith: $30,000 (no win bonus) def. John MaCololooy: $5,000
- Josh Hokit: $26,000 (includes $13,000 win bonus) def. Sean Rose: $2,000
- Ashley Thiner: $4,000 (includes $2,000 win bonus) def. Aysia Cortez: $10,000

== Fight night weights ==
The following is the official weigh-in weights compared to the fight night weights reported by the California State Athletic Commission.

- Usman Nurmagomedov: 154.8 to 173.6 (19 pounds), 12%
- Alexander Shabily: 154.8 to 174.0 (19 pounds), 12%
- Lorenz Larkin: 170.4 to 188.8 (18 pounds), 11%
- Levan Chokheli: 170.8 to 189 (18 pounds), 11%
- Aaron Jeffery: 184.4 to 201.6 (17 pounds), 9%
- Douglas Lima: 184.6 to 189.9 (5 pounds), 3%
- Mackenzie Stiller: 125.2 to 131.8 (7 pounds), 5%
- Sumiko Inaba: 125.2 to 135.6 (10 pounds), 8%
- Zhora Aivazian: 155.4 to 169.2 (14 pounds), 9%
- Yancey Medeiros: 155.2 to 177 (22 pounds), 14%
- Imamshavi Aliev: 185.0 to 208.2 (23 pounds), 13%
- Jordan Newman: 185.2 to 192 (7 pounds), 4%
- Herman Terrado: 170.4 to 195.8 (25 pounds), 15%
- Masayuki Kikuiri: 169.0 to 181.8 (13 pounds), 8%
- John MaCalolooy: 134.8 to 146.4 (12 pounds), 9%
- Bryce Meredith: 135.8 to 153.0 (17 pounds), 13%
- Josh Hokit: 242.2 to 243.6 (1 pounds), 1%
- Sean Rose: 264.8 to 272.4 (8 pounds), 3%
- Aysia Cortez: 116 to 131 15 (pounds), 13%
- Ashley Thiner: 115 to 135.8 (21 pounds), 18%

== See also ==
- 2024 in Bellator MMA
- List of Bellator MMA events
- List of current Bellator fighters
