= Marc Diakiese =

English mixed martial artist

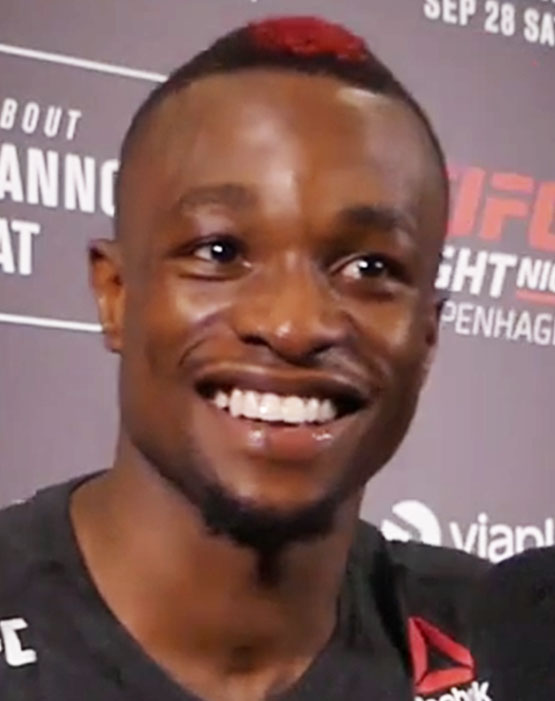
- Marc Diakese UFC Fight Night 160 in Copenhagen
- Born: 16 March 1993 (age 33); Kinshasa, Zaire (now Kinshasa, Democratic Republic of the Congo)
- Other names: Bonecrusher
- Nationality: British
- Height: 5 ft 10 in (1.78 m)
- Weight: 155 lb (70 kg; 11 st 1 lb)
- Division: Lightweight
- Reach: 75 in (191 cm)
- Fighting out of: Doncaster, England
- Team: American Top Team (2016–present); Titan Fighter; Asylum Vale Tudo; London Shootfighters Scramble Academy Leeds
- Rank: Purple belt in Brazilian Jiu-Jitsu
- Years active: 2013–present

Mixed martial arts record
- Total: 27
- Wins: 18
- By knockout: 6
- By submission: 1
- By decision: 11
- Losses: 9
- By knockout: 1
- By submission: 3
- By decision: 5

Other information
- Mixed martial arts record from Sherdog

Marc Diakiese /djæˈkeɪsi/ (born 16 March 1993) is an English professional mixed martial artist who currently competes in the Lightweight division of Oktagon MMA He formerly competed for the Ultimate Fighting Championship, Bellator MMA, Professional Fighters League, Caged Steel and BAMMA, where he is the former BAMMA British Lightweight Champion.

== Background ==
Aged 17, Diakiese began training in mixed martial arts to keep fit and stay out of trouble. Before turning professional, he worked as a railway engineer. Diakiese was also a promising footballer before committing to mixed martial arts.

== Mixed martial arts career ==
=== Early career ===
As an amateur, Diakiese went 9–0 and simultaneously held three different titles. He turned professional in 2013 after struggling to find willing opponents.

=== BAMMA ===
After four wins in under a year in regional promotions, Diakiese joined BAMMA on a five-fight contract in 2014. In September, he made his promotional debut against Jefferson George at BAMMA 16 and won the fight by unanimous decision. In December, he beat Vernon O'Neill via unanimous decision at BAMMA 17.

In March 2015, Diakiese faced Jack McGann at BAMMA 19 for the vacant Lightweight Championship. He won the fight by unanimous decision. In September, he defended his title at BAMMA 22 with a knockout 24 seconds into the first round against Rick Selvarajah. In February 2016, Diakiese signed a new deal with the promotion.

Three months later, he successfully defended his title for a second time with another first-round knockout. Diakiese finished Kane Mousah in 36 seconds at BAMMA 25 and subsequently earned a UFC contract.

=== Ultimate Fighting Championship ===
Diakiese was scheduled to make his UFC debut against Reza Madadi on 8 October 2016 at UFC 204. However, Madadi withdrew from the bout due to an eye injury and was replaced by Łukasz Sajewski. After being smothered by his opponent in the first round, Diakiese came back to win the fight by TKO due to knees and punches near the end of the second round.

Diakiese returned to face Frankie Perez on 9 December 2016 at UFC Fight Night: Lewis vs. Abdurakhimov. Despite losing the second round, Diakiese would go on to win the bout by unanimous decision.

Diakiese faced Teemu Packalén on 18 March 2017 at UFC Fight Night: Manuwa vs. Anderson. He won the fight via knockout 30 seconds into the first round. The win earned Diakiese his first Performance of the Night bonus.

Diakiese faced Drakkar Klose on 7 July 2017 at The Ultimate Fighter 25 Finale. He lost the fight by split decision.

Diakiese faced Dan Hooker on 30 December 2017 at UFC 219. He lost the fight via guillotine choke submission in the third round.

Diakiese faced Nasrat Haqparast on 22 July 2018 at UFC Fight Night 134. He lost the fight via unanimous decision after being knocked down multiple times during the bout.

Diakiese faced Joseph Duffy on 16 March 2019 at UFC Fight Night 147. He won the fight by unanimous decision.

In May 2019, Diakiese revealed on his social media that he had signed a new, multi-fight contract with the UFC.

Diakiese faced Lando Vannata on 28 September 2019 at UFC Fight Night 160. He won the fight via unanimous decision.

Diakiese was scheduled to face Stevie Ray on 21 March 2020 at UFC Fight Night: Woodley vs. Edwards. However, Ray was removed from the card late-January for undisclosed reasons. Diakiese was expected to remain on the card against promotional newcomer Jai Herbert. Due to the COVID-19 pandemic, the event was eventually postponed . Instead Diakiese was scheduled to face Alan Patrick on 19 July 2020 at UFC Fight Night 172. However, on 14 June, Patrick withdrew from the event for unknown reason and he was replaced by Rafael Fiziev. He lost the fight via unanimous decision. This fight earned him the Fight of the Night award.

Diakiese was scheduled to face Rafael Alves on 4 September 2021 at UFC Fight Night 191. However, Alves pulled out of the fight in mid-August for undisclosed reasons and in turn, Diakiese was removed from the card as well. In turn, the pair was rescheduled at UFC Fight Night 197 on 13 November 2021. Diakiese lost the bout via guillotine choke submission in the first round.

Diakiese faced Viacheslav Borshchev on 26 March 2022 at UFC on ESPN 33. He won the fight by unanimous decision after controlling Borshchev on the ground for nearly twelve and a half minutes.

As the first bout of his new four-fight contract, Diakiese faced Damir Hadžović on 23 July 2022 at UFC Fight Night 208. He won the fight by unanimous decision.

Diakiese faced Michael Johnson on 3 December 2022 at UFC on ESPN 42. He lost the bout via unanimous decision.

Diakiese faced Joel Álvarez on 22 July 2023 at UFC Fight Night 224. He lost the fight via brabo submission in the second round.

Diakiese faced Kauê Fernandes on 4 November 2023 at UFC Fight Night 231. He won the fight via split decision.

=== Professional Fighters League ===
It was reported on 8 June 2024 that Diakiese signed with the Professional Fighters League (PFL) and will compete this year.

In his debut for the promotion, Diakiese faced Tim Wilde on 14 September 2024 at Bellator Champions Series 5. He won the fight by unanimous decision.

On January 15, 2025, it was announced that Diakiese joined the 2025 PFL World Tournament in a lightweight division.

In the quarterfinal, Diakiese faced Gadzhi Rabadanov on April 18, 2025, at PFL 3. He lost the fight via knockout in round one.

== Professional grappling career ==
Diakiese faced Benoît Saint Denis in the no gi main event of ADXC 4 on May 18, 2024. He lost the match by unanimous decision.

== Personal life ==
In 2017, he became the first UFC fighter to pose for Gay Times, an LGBT publication.

Diakiese has a son and a daughter.

== Championships and accomplishments ==
=== Mixed martial arts ===
- Ultimate Fighting Championship
  - Performance of the Night (One time) vs. Teemu Packalén
  - Fight of the Night (One time) vs. Rafael Fiziev
  - UFC.com Awards
    - 2016: Ranked #6 Newcomer of the Year
    - 2017: Ranked #8 Knockout of the Year vs. Teemu Packalen
- BAMMA
  - BAMMA Lonsdale British Lightweight Championship (One time)
    - Two successful title defenses
- Cage Kumite
  - Cage Kumite Lightweight Championship (One time)
- MMA Total Combat
  - MMATC Lightweight Championship (One time)
- MMADNA.nl
  - 2016 European Newcomer of the Year

== Mixed martial arts record ==
Professional record breakdown
| 27 matches | 18 wins | 9 losses |
| By knockout | 6 | 1 |
| By submission | 1 | 3 |
| By decision | 11 | 5 |

| Res. | Record | Opponent | Method | Event | Date | Round | Time | Location | Notes |
|---|---|---|---|---|---|---|---|---|---|
| Loss | 18–9 | Fedor Duric | Decision (unanimous) | Oktagon 94 | September 26, 2026 | 3 | 5:00 | Frankfurt, Germany | |
| Loss | 18–8 | Gadzhi Rabadanov | KO (punches) | PFL 3 (2025) | April 18, 2025 | 1 | 0:32 | Orlando, Florida, United States | 2025 PFL Lightweight Tournament Quarterfinal. |
| Win | 18–7 | Tim Wilde | Decision (unanimous) | Bellator Champions Series 5 | September 14, 2024 | 3 | 5:00 | London, England | |
| Win | 17–7 | Kauê Fernandes | Decision (split) | UFC Fight Night: Almeida vs. Lewis | 4 November 2023 | 3 | 5:00 | São Paulo, Brazil | |
| Loss | 16–7 | Joel Álvarez | Submission (brabo choke) | UFC Fight Night: Aspinall vs. Tybura | 22 July 2023 | 2 | 4:26 | London, England | |
| Loss | 16–6 | Michael Johnson | Decision (unanimous) | UFC on ESPN: Thompson vs. Holland | 3 December 2022 | 3 | 5:00 | Orlando, Florida, United States | |
| Win | 16–5 | Damir Hadžović | Decision (unanimous) | UFC Fight Night: Blaydes vs. Aspinall | 23 July 2022 | 3 | 5:00 | London, England | |
| Win | 15–5 | Viacheslav Borschev | Decision (unanimous) | UFC on ESPN: Blaydes vs. Daukaus | 26 March 2022 | 3 | 5:00 | Columbus, Ohio, United States | |
| Loss | 14–5 | Rafael Alves | Submission (guillotine choke) | UFC Fight Night: Holloway vs. Rodríguez | 13 November 2021 | 1 | 1:48 | Las Vegas, Nevada, United States | |
| Loss | 14–4 | Rafael Fiziev | Decision (unanimous) | UFC Fight Night: Figueiredo vs. Benavidez 2 | 19 July 2020 | 3 | 5:00 | Abu Dhabi, United Arab Emirates | Fight of the Night. |
| Win | 14–3 | Lando Vannata | Decision (unanimous) | UFC Fight Night: Hermansson vs. Cannonier | 28 September 2019 | 3 | 5:00 | Copenhagen, Denmark | |
| Win | 13–3 | Joseph Duffy | Decision (unanimous) | UFC Fight Night: Till vs. Masvidal | 16 March 2019 | 3 | 5:00 | London, England | |
| Loss | 12–3 | Nasrat Haqparast | Decision (unanimous) | UFC Fight Night: Shogun vs. Smith | 22 July 2018 | 3 | 5:00 | Hamburg, Germany | |
| Loss | 12–2 | Dan Hooker | Submission (guillotine choke) | UFC 219 | 30 December 2017 | 3 | 0:42 | Las Vegas, Nevada, United States | |
| Loss | 12–1 | Drakkar Klose | Decision (split) | The Ultimate Fighter: Redemption Finale | 7 July 2017 | 3 | 5:00 | Las Vegas, Nevada, United States | |
| Win | 12–0 | Teemu Packalén | KO (punch) | UFC Fight Night: Manuwa vs. Anderson | 18 March 2017 | 1 | 0:30 | London, England | Performance of the Night. |
| Win | 11–0 | Frankie Perez | Decision (unanimous) | UFC Fight Night: Lewis vs. Abdurakhimov | 9 December 2016 | 3 | 5:00 | Albany, New York, United States | |
| Win | 10–0 | Łukasz Sajewski | TKO (knees and punches) | UFC 204 | 8 October 2016 | 2 | 4:40 | Manchester, England | |
| Win | 9–0 | Kane Mousah | KO (punch) | BAMMA 25 | 14 May 2016 | 1 | 0:36 | Birmingham, England | Defended the BAMMA British Lightweight Championship. |
| Win | 8–0 | Rick Selvarajah | KO (punch) | BAMMA 22 | 19 September 2015 | 1 | 0:24 | Dublin, Ireland | Defended the BAMMA British Lightweight Championship. |
| Win | 7–0 | Jack McGann | Decision (unanimous) | BAMMA 19 | 28 March 2015 | 3 | 5:00 | Blackpool, England | Won the vacant BAMMA British Lightweight Championship. |
| Win | 6–0 | Vernon O'Neil | Decision (unanimous) | BAMMA 17 | 6 December 2014 | 3 | 5:00 | Manchester, England | |
| Win | 5–0 | Jefferson George | Decision (unanimous) | BAMMA 16 | 13 September 2014 | 3 | 5:00 | Manchester, England | |
| Win | 4–0 | Danny Welsh | Submission (rear-naked choke) | Caged Steel FC 8 | 28 June 2014 | 1 | 2:16 | Doncaster, England | |
| Win | 3–0 | Jakob Grzegorzek | Decision (unanimous) | Caged Steel FC 7 | 29 March 2014 | 3 | 5:00 | Doncaster, England | |
| Win | 2–0 | Tom Earnshaw | TKO (punches) | Cage Kumite 2 | 1 November 2013 | 1 | 4:52 | Barnsley, England | Won the Cage Kumite Lightweight Championship. |
| Win | 1–0 | Harris Neofytou | TKO (punches) | MMA Total Combat 55 | 21 September 2013 | 1 | 1:27 | Spennymoor, England | Lightweight debut. Won the MMATC Lightweight Championship. |
