= Sara Collins (fighter) =

Australian MMA fighter

- Born: August 22, 1990 (age 36); Victoria, Australia
- Nationality: Australia
- Height: 5 ft 7 in (1.70 m)
- Weight: 145 lb (66 kg)
- Division: Featherweight
- Reach: 69 in (175 cm)
- Style: Judo
- Fighting out of: Victoria, Australia
- Team: Resilience Training Centre
- Years active: 2019–present (MMA)

Mixed martial arts record
- Total: 7
- Wins: 6
- By submission: 3
- By decision: 3
- Losses: 1
- By submission: 1

Other information
- Mixed martial arts record from Sherdog
- Judo career

Judo achievements and titles
- World Champ.: R32 (2011, 2013)
- Oceania Champ.: (silver) (2012, 2013, 2015)
- Commonwealth Games: 7th (2014)
Medal record
Women's judo
Representing Australia
Oceania Championships
Silver medal – second place	2012 Cairns	‍–‍70 kg
Silver medal – second place	2013 Apia	‍–‍70 kg
Silver medal – second place	2015 Nouvelle	‍–‍70 kg
Bronze medal – third place	2011 Papeete	‍–‍70 kg
Bronze medal – third place	2014 Auckland	‍–‍70 kg

Profile at external judo databases
- IJF: 1066
- JudoInside.com: 50279
- Last updated on: 6 October 2024

Sara Collins (born August 22, 1990) is an Australian mixed martial artist and former judoka, competing in the Featherweight division of PFL MMA.

== Background ==
Collins is a judo black belt who started training in the sport at 10, going on to be a member of the Australian National Judo Team for 10 years, representing Australia at the World Judo Championships three times, at 63 kg in 2010 and at 70 kg in 2011 and 2013. She competed in the Judo World Cup from 2009–2015, as well as at the 2014 Commonwealth Games at 70 kg. She won five medals at the Oceania Championships in the time period of 2011–2015, was a Bronze medalist at the Commonwealth Judo Championships in 2012 and was the Australian champion in 2010, 2012, 2013 and 2015.

However, she was not able to achieve continued success in judo due to injuries, which included three knee surgeries and a ruptured Achilles tendon. These setbacks eventually led her to make the switch to MMA, and making her professional debut in 2019. She was inspired to start MMA after attending UFC 193 to support her teammate Dan Kelly.

== Professional MMA career ==
=== Bellator MMA ===
After going 3-0 on the Australian regionals, Collins made her Bellator debut, Collins faced Pam Sorenson faced on March 31, 2023, at Bellator 293. She won the fight via a scarf hold armlock submission in the first round.

Collins faced Sinead Kavanagh on September 23, 2023, at Bellator 299. She won the fight via split decision.

Collins faced Leah McCourt in a Bellator Women's Featherweight title eliminator on September 14, 2024, at Bellator Champions Series 5, winning the fight via a rear-naked choke submission in the first round.

=== Professional Fighters League ===
Collins faced Cris Cyborg for the PFL Women's Featherweight Championship on December 13, 2025, at PFL Europe 4. She lost the fight via a rear-naked choke in round three.

== Mixed martial arts record ==
Professional record breakdown
7 matches	6 wins	1 loss
By submission	3	1
By decision	3	0

Res.	Record	Opponent	Method	Event	Date	Round	Time	Location	Notes
Loss	6–1	Cris Cyborg	Submission (rear-naked choke)	PFL Lyon: Nemkov vs. Ferreira	December 13, 2025	3	2:55	Décines-Charpieu, France	For the inaugural PFL Women's Featherweight Championship.
Win	6–0	Leah McCourt	Submission (rear-naked choke)	Bellator Champions Series 5	September 14, 2024	1	2:25	London, England	Bellator Women's Featherweight title eliminator.
Win	5–0	Sinead Kavanagh	Decision (split)	Bellator 299	September 23, 2023	3	5:00	Dublin, Ireland	
Win	4–0	Pam Sorenson	Submission (scarf hold armlock)	Bellator 293	March 31, 2023	1	2:43	Temecula, California, United States	
Win	3–0	Jamie Edenden	Decision (unanimous)	Eternal MMA 64	March 19, 2022	3	5:00	Gold Coast, Australia	
Win	2–0	Annie Thatcher	Submission (armbar)	Demolition Fight Series 4	November 20, 2021	2	4:18	Melbourne, Australia	Featherweight debut. Won vacant DFS Featherweight Championship.
Win	1–0	Gase Sanita	Decision (unanimous)	Hex Fight Series 19	September 6, 2019	3	5:00	Flemington, Australia	Lightweight debut.

== See also ==
- List of current Bellator fighters
- List of female mixed martial artists
