= PFL Austin: Eblen vs. Kasanganay 2 =

Professional Fighters League MMA event in 2026

- The poster for PFL Austin: Eblen vs. Kasanganay 2
- Promotion: Professional Fighters League
- Date: July 18, 2026
- Venue: Moody Center
- City: Austin, Texas, United States

Event chronology
PFL MENA 10	PFL Austin: Eblen vs. Kasanganay 2	PFL Washington DC: Jean vs. Rodriguez

PFL Austin: Eblen vs. Kasanganay 2 was a mixed martial arts event produced by the Professional Fighters League that took place on July 18, 2026, at Moody Center in Austin, Texas, United States.

== Background ==
The event marked the promotion's first visit to Austin, it's sixth visit to the state of Texas, since PFL 1 (2024) in April 2024.

A PFL Middleweight Championship rematch between current champion Costello van Steenis and former Bellator Middleweight World Champion Johnny Eblen was scheduled to headline this event. The pairing previously fought at PFL Champions Series 2 in July 2025, which van Steenis won the title by fifth round technical submission. However, van Steenis withdrew from the bout due to sustained an injury and was replaced by 2023 PFL Light Heavyweight Tournament winner Impa Kasanganay for the interim title. Eblen and Kasanganay previously met at PFL vs. Bellator in August 2024, which Eblen won the bout by split decision.

A bantamweight bout between former Bellator Bantamweight World Champion Sergio Pettis and 2024 PFL Europe Bantamweight Tournament winner Lewis McGrillen was scheduled at this event. However, Pettis withdrew due to an injury and was replaced by Rafael do Nascimento.

In addition, a featherweight bout between 2023 PFL Featherweight Tournament winner Jesus Pinedo and Levy Saúl Marroquín was scheduled at this event, but Marroquín pulled out from the event and was replaced by Joey Ruquet. At the weigh-ins, Pinedo weighed in at 146.8 pounds, 0.8 pounds over the featherweight non-title fight limit and he was fined a percentage of his purse, which went to Ruquet.

== Results ==
Main card (ESPN2)
Weight class				Method	Round	Time	Notes
Middleweight	Johnny Eblen	def.	Impa Kasanganay	TKO (elbow and punches)	3	2:39	(Note: For the interim PFL Middleweight Championship.)
Bantamweight	Rafael do Nascimento	def.	Lewis McGrillen	Submission (rear-naked choke)	2	2:07
Featherweight	Julio Arce	def.	Caolán Loughran	Decision (unanimous) (30–27, 30–27, 29–28)	3	5:00
Featherweight	Jesus Pinedo	def.	Joey Ruquet	TKO (punches and elbows)	1	4:50	(Note: Pinedo missed weight (146.8 lb).)
Preliminary card (ESPN+)
Lightweight	Gamid Khizriev	def.	Biaggio Ali Walsh	Submission (twister)	1	2:32
Women's Flyweight	Aleksandra Savicheva	def.	Andrea Vázquez	Decision (split) (29–28, 28–29, 29–28)	3	5:00
Women's Flyweight	Ashley Thiner	def.	Mia Grawe	Decision (unanimous) (29–28, 29–28, 29–28)	3	5:00
Catchweight (150 lb)	Jackson Glass	def.	Zak Flessas	TKO (punches and soccer kicks)	1	0:47
Women's Flyweight	Victoria Alba	def.	Borena Tsertsvadze	TKO (front kick to the body and punches)	3	4:50

== See also ==
- 2026 in Professional Fighters League
- List of PFL events
- List of current PFL fighters
