= Sumiko Inaba =

American mixed martial arts fighter

- Born: February 6, 1991 (age 35); Pukalani, Hawaii, U.S.
- Other names: Lady Samurai
- Height: 5 ft 4 in (1.63 m)
- Weight: 125 lb (57 kg; 8 st 13 lb)
- Division: Flyweight
- Reach: 64.0 in (163 cm)
- Fighting out of: Hawaii, U.S.
- Team: Fly Pen Boxing; Maui
- Years active: 2020–present

Mixed martial arts record
- Total: 11
- Wins: 8
- By knockout: 4
- By submission: 1
- By decision: 3
- Losses: 3
- By decision: 3

Amateur boxing record
- Total: 5
- Wins: 4
- By knockout: 3
- Losses: 1

Other information
- Mixed martial arts record from Sherdog

Sumiko Inaba (born February 6, 1991) is an American mixed martial artist who competes in the Women's Flyweight division of the Professional Fighters League.

== Background ==
After graduating King Kekaulike High School, Inaba studied nursing before she discovered mixed martial arts while attending boxing classes to get into shape.

She has a daughter, Kiyarah-Lei, who was born around 2009.

== Mixed martial arts career ==
=== Early career ===
She went 6-1 as an amateur, including four TKOs and one submission. After the pandemic put her career in the travel industry on hiatus, she put her full-time efforts into training. She decided to go professional in 2020 and landed an endorsement with Hilo-based Waiakea Water Company.

=== Bellator MMA ===
After a successful amateur career, Inaba signed with Bellator MMA.

She made her professional MMA debut against Jessica Ruiz on November 5, 2020, at Bellator 251.

In her sophomore performance, Inaba faced Kristina Katsikis on May 21, 2021, at Bellator 259. She won the bout via third-round TKO.

Inaba faced Randi Field on October 16, 2021, at Bellator 268. She won the bout via arm-triangle choke in the second round.

Inaba faced Whittany Pyles on April 23, 2022, at Bellator 279. At the weigh-ins, Pyles missed weight for her bout, weighing in at 127.4 pounds, 1.4 pounds over the flyweight non-title fight limit. The bout proceeded at catchweight and Pyles was fined a percentage of her purse, which went to Inaba. Inaba knocked out her opponent with a left hook in the first round.

Inaba faced Nadine Mandiau on October 1, 2022, at Bellator 286. She won the bout after grinding out a unanimous decision.

Inaba faced Veta Arteaga on April 22, 2023, at Bellator 295. She won the bout via unanimous decision.

Inaba faced Denise Kielholtz on November 17, 2023, at Bellator 301. In a bout contested mostly on the feet, Kielholtz maintained the advantage and won the bout via unanimous decision.

Inaba was scheduled to Kaytlin Neil on April 4, 2024 at PFL 1. However, a week before the event it was announced that Inaba had pulled out.

=== Professional Fighters League ===
Inaba made her debut with the Professional Fighters League on June 13, 2024 as she faced Saray Orozco at PFL 4. She won the bout via split decision.

Inaba faced Mackenzie Stiller on September 7, 2024 at Bellator Champions Series 4. She won the fight via TKO in the second round.

Inaba faced Dakota Ditcheva on July 19, 2025, at PFL Champions Series 2. She lost the bout via unanimous decision.

Inaba faced Ariane da Silva on March 28, 2026, at PFL Pittsburgh. She lost the fight via unanimous decision.

== Mixed martial arts record ==
Professional record breakdown
11 matches	8 wins	3 losses
By knockout	4	0
By submission	1	0
By decision	3	3

Res.	Record	Opponent	Method	Event	Date	Round	Time	Location	Notes
Loss	8–3	Ariane da Silva	Decision (unanimous)	PFL Pittsburgh: Eblen vs. Battle	March 28, 2026	3	5:00	Moon Township, Pennsylvania, United States	
Loss	8–2	Dakota Ditcheva	Decision (unanimous)	PFL Champions Series 2	July 19, 2025	3	5:00	Cape Town, South Africa	
Win	8–1	Mackenzie Stiller	TKO (punches)	Bellator Champions Series 4	September 7, 2024	2	4:25	San Diego, California, United States	
Win	7–1	Saray Orozco	Decision (split)	PFL 4 (2024)	June 13, 2024	3	5:00	Uncasville, Connecticut, United States	
Loss	6–1	Denise Kielholtz	Decision (unanimous)	Bellator 301	November 17, 2023	3	5:00	Chicago, Illinois, United States	
Win	6–0	Veta Arteaga	Decision (unanimous)	Bellator 295	April 22, 2023	3	5:00	Honolulu, Hawaii, United States	
Win	5–0	Nadine Mandiau	Decision (unanimous)	Bellator 286	October 1, 2022	3	5:00	Long Beach, California, United States	
Win	4–0	Whittany Pyles	KO (punches)	Bellator 279	April 23, 2022	1	1:22	Honolulu, Hawaii, United States	Catchweight (127.4 lb) bout; Pyles missed weight.
Win	3–0	Randi Field	Submission (arm-triangle choke)	Bellator 268	October 16, 2021	2	2:02	Phoenix, Arizona, United States	
Win	2–0	Kristina Katsikis	TKO (punches)	Bellator 259	May 21, 2021	3	3:35	Uncasville, Connecticut, United States	
Win	1–0	Jessica Ruiz	TKO (elbows)	Bellator 251	November 5, 2020	1	4:59	Uncasville, Connecticut, United States	

Amateur record breakdown		
7 matches	6 wins	1 loss
By knockout	4	0
By submission	1	0
By decision	1	1

Res.	Record	Opponent	Method	Event	Date	Round	Time	Location	Notes
Win	6–1	Kelsey Gilmore	TKO (punches)	Cowboy Fight Series 2	June 29, 2019	3	0:57	Sterling, Virginia, United States	Won the vacant CFS Flyweight Championship.
Win	5–1	Nadine Mandiau	TKO (punches)	Tuff-N-Uff: Fight Night Henderson	October 5, 2018	1	1:05	Henderson, Nevada, United States	Won the TUFF Strawweight Championship.
Win	4–1	Tenika Waldroup	Submission (armbar)	Tuff-N-Uff: Pack The Mack	June 30, 2018	2	2:03	Las Vegas, Nevada, United States	Won the TUFF Flyweight Championship.
Win	3–1	Brianne Jhun	Decision (unanimous)	War on the Valley Isle 6	November 11, 2017	3	3:00	Wailuku, Hawaii, United States	Won the SBC Flyweight Championship.
Win	2–1	Des Vida	TKO (punches)	War on the Valley Isle 5	November 12, 2016	2	2:31	Wailuku, Hawaii, United States	
Loss	1–1	Kendra Elizabeth Linn	Decision (majority)	Maui FC 6	March 26, 2016	3	3:00	Maui, Hawaii, United States	
Win	1–0	Katherine Antoniak	TKO (punches)	War on the Valley Isle 3	November 8, 2014	2	1:49	Kahului, Hawaii, United States	

== See also ==
- List of current Bellator fighters
- List of female mixed martial artists
