= Bellator Champions Series 1 =

Mixed martial arts event in 2024

Bellator Champions Series 1: Anderson vs. Moore
- The poster for Bellator Champions Series 1: Anderson vs. Moore
- Promotion: Bellator MMA
- Date: March 22, 2024
- Venue: SSE Arena
- City: Belfast, Northern Ireland

Event chronology
PFL vs. Bellator	Bellator Champions Series 1: Anderson vs. Moore	Bellator Champions Series 2: Mix vs. Magomedov 2

Bellator Champions Series 1: Anderson vs. Moore (also known as Bellator Champions Series Belfast and Bellator 302) was a mixed martial arts event produced by Bellator MMA, that took place on March 22, 2024, at the SSE Arena in Belfast, Northern Ireland. It marked the first show to air on Max as part of a new U.S. television deal with Warner Bros. Discovery.

== Background ==
The inaugural "Champions Series" card was Bellator's first event since it was acquired by the Professional Fighters League (PFL) late last year; with PFL vs. Bellator being a co-promoted event. It was also the promotion's second visit to Belfast, and the first since Bellator 173 in February 2017.

A Bellator Light Heavyweight World Championship bout for the vacant title between The Ultimate Fighter: Team Edgar vs. Team Penn light heavyweight winner Corey Anderson and Karl Moore headlined the event. The previous titleholder Vadim Nemkov vacated the title and returned in the heavyweight division against 2021 PFL heavyweight winner Bruno Cappelozza at PFL vs. Bellator: Champions on February 24.

A featherweight bout between Sinead Kavanagh and Leah McCourt was scheduled for this event. On February 20, McCourt announced that she was out of the bout after suffering broken ribs and a torn oblique.

A featherweight bout between Jeremy Kennedy and James Gallagher was scheduled for this event. However, at the beginning of the month, Kennedy was rescheduled for a Bellator Featherweight Championship bout against reigning champion Patrício Pitbull, while Gallagher was rescheduled against Leandro Higo.

On March 15, it was announced that the lightweight bout between 2019 Rizin Lightweight Grand Prix winner Tofiq Musayev and Alfie Davis and the middleweight bout between Steven Hill and Jordan Newman were scrapped. Instead, Davis will take on Oscar Ownsworth (8-2-1) and both middleweight will no longer appear on the card.

At the weigh-ins, Vikas Singh Ruhil weighed in at 147 pounds, one pound over the featherweight non-title fight limit. His bout proceeded at catchweight and he was fined a percent of his purse which went to his opponent Nathan Kelly.

== Results ==
Main card (DAZN / MAX)
Weight class				Method	Round	Time	Notes
Light Heavyweight	Corey Anderson	def.	Karl Moore	Decision (unanimous) (49–46, 49–46, 50–45)	5	5:00	(Note: For the vacant Bellator Light Heavyweight World Championship.)
Featherweight	Patrício Pitbull (c)	def.	Jeremy Kennedy	TKO (knees and punches)	3	4:07	(Note: For the Bellator Featherweight World Championship.)
Middleweight	Fabian Edwards	def.	Aaron Jeffery	Decision (unanimous) (29–28, 29–28, 29–28)	3	5:00	(Note: Bellator Middleweight title eliminator.)
Featherweight	Leandro Higo	def.	James Gallagher	Decision (unanimous) (29–28, 29–28, 29–28)	3	5:00
Lightweight	Manoel Sousa	def.	Tim Wilde	KO (punch)	1	4:48
Preliminary card (MAX)
Bantamweight	Ciarán Clarke	def.	Darius Mafi	Submission (arm-triangle choke)	3	0:41
Lightweight	Alfie Davis	def.	Oscar Ownsworth	Decision (unanimous) (30–27, 30–27, 30–27)	3	5:00
Light Heavyweight	Luke Trainer	def.	Grant Neal	Decision (unanimous) (30–27, 30–27, 30–27)	3	5:00
Featherweight	Nathan Kelly	def.	Vikas Singh Ruhil	KO (elbow)	1	0:40	(Note: Singh Ruhil missed weight (147 lb).)
Heavyweight	Abraham Bably	def.	Isaiah Pinson	Decision (unanimous) (30–27, 30–27, 30–27)	3	5:00
Amateur bout
Catchweight (130 lb)	Nate Kelly	def.	Jordan Elliot	Submission (armbar)	1	1:48

== See also ==
- 2024 in Bellator MMA
- List of Bellator MMA events
- List of current Bellator fighters
