= PFL 3 (2025) =

Professional Fighters League MMA event in 2025

- The poster for PFL 3
- Promotion: Professional Fighters League
- Date: April 18, 2025
- Venue: Universal Studios Florida
- City: Orlando, Florida, United States

Event chronology
| PFL 2 | PFL 3 | PFL 4 |

The PFL 3 mixed martial arts event for the 2025 season of the Professional Fighters League was held on April 18, 2025, at Soundstage 19 of Universal Studios Florida in Orlando, Florida, United States. This event marked the quarterfinal of the single-elimination tournament format in the Middleweight and Lightweight divisions.

== Background ==
The event featured the quarterfinal of 2025 PFL World Tournament in a middleweight and lightweight divisions.

Fabian Edwards withdrew from the middleweight quarterfinal against 2023 PFL light heavyweight winner Impa Kasanganay for unknown reasons and has briefly been replaced by Jordan Newman, who scheduled to face Khalid Murtazaliev in an alternate bout. Subsequently, it was announced that Edwards pushed back in his original spot.

On April 12, it was announced that Alexandr Shabliy withdrew from the tournament for unknown reasons against former Bellator Lightweight World Champion Brent Primus and was replaced by Vinicius Sacchelli Cenci. In addition, Nick Maximov replaced Jordan Newman against Khalid Murtazaliev in a middleweight alternate bout. Subsequently, the bout between Maximov and Murtazaliev was removed from the event after Maximov withdrew.

A lightweight alternate bout between Antonio Caruso and Robert Watley was cancelled shortly after the event started due to an illness suffered by Watley.

== Results ==
Main card (ESPN / ESPN+)
| Weight class | | | | Method | Round | Time | Notes |
|---|---|---|---|---|---|---|---|
| Middleweight | Fabian Edwards | def. | Impa Kasanganay | TKO (punches) | 2 | 2:14 | (Note: 2025 PFL Middleweight Tournament Quarterfinal.) |
| Lightweight | Gadzhi Rabadanov | def. | Marc Diakiese | KO (punches) | 1 | 0:32 | (Note: 2025 PFL Lightweight Tournament Quarterfinal.) |
| Middleweight | Dalton Rosta | def. | Sadibou Sy | Submission (brabo choke) | 2 | 3:29 | (Note: 2025 PFL Middleweight Tournament Quarterfinal.) |
| Lightweight | Jay-Jay Wilson | def. | Mads Burnell | TKO (elbows and punches) | 3 | 4:42 | (Note: 2025 PFL Lightweight Tournament Quarterfinal.) |
| Lightweight | Alfie Davis | def. | Clay Collard | TKO (spinning back elbow and punches) | 1 | 2:12 | (Note: 2025 PFL Lightweight Tournament Quarterfinal.) |
Preliminary card (ESPN+)
| Middleweight | Josh Silveira | def. | Mike Shipman | Decision (unanimous) (29–28, 29–28, 29–28) | 3 | 5:00 | (Note: 2025 PFL Middleweight Tournament Quarterfinal.) |
| Lightweight | Brent Primus | def. | Vinicius Sacchelli Cenci | Submission (rear-naked choke) | 3 | 4:52 | (Note: 2025 PFL Lightweight Tournament Quarterfinal.) |
| Middleweight | Aaron Jeffery | def. | Murad Ramazanov | Decision (split) (28–29, 29–28, 29–28) | 3 | 5:00 | (Note: 2025 PFL Middleweight Tournament Quarterfinal.) |

== Tournament brackets ==
=== 2025 PFL Middleweight Tournament ===
Quarter-finals
(United States) Impa Kasanganay | 2
(England) Fabian Edwards | TKO
(England) Mike Shipman | 3
(United States) Josh Silveira | UD
(United States) Dalton Rosta | SUB
(Sweden) Sadibou Sy | 2
(Canada) Aaron Jeffery | SD
(Russia) Murad Ramazanov | 3

Semi-finals
(England) Fabian Edwards
(United States) Josh Silveira
(United States) Dalton Rosta
(Canada) Aaron Jeffery

Final

=== 2025 PFL Lightweight Tournament ===
Quarter-finals
(Brazil) Vinicius Sacchelli Cenci (Note: Alexandr Shabliy withdrew from the tournament due to undisclosed reasons and was replaced by Vinicius Sacchelli Cenci.) | 3
(United States) Brent Primus | SUB
(United States) Clay Collard | 3
(England) Alfie Davis | UD
(Russia) Gadzhi Rabadanov | KO
(Democratic Republic of the Congo) Marc Diakiese | 1
(New Zealand) Jay-Jay Wilson | TKO
(Denmark) Mads Burnell | 3

Semi-finals
(United States) Brent Primus
(England) Alfie Davis
(Russia) Gadzhi Rabadanov
(New Zealand) Jay-Jay Wilson

Final

== See also ==
- 2025 in Professional Fighters League
- List of PFL events
- List of current PFL fighters
