= Leah McCourt =

Irish mixed martial artist (born 1992)

- Born: 21 June 1992 (age 34); Saintfield, Northern Ireland
- Other names: The Curse
- Height: 5 ft 8 in (1.73 m)
- Weight: 145 lb (66 kg)
- Division: Featherweight
- Reach: 69 in (175 cm)
- Fighting out of: Belfast, Northern Ireland
- Team: Straight Blast Gym; Next Generation MMA Liverpool; ACTJJ International
- Rank: Black belt in Brazilian Jiu-Jitsu; Black belt in Judo
- Years active: 2017–present (MMA)

Mixed martial arts record
- Total: 12
- Wins: 8
- By knockout: 2
- By submission: 2
- By decision: 4
- Losses: 4
- By knockout: 1
- By submission: 1
- By decision: 2

Other information
- Mixed martial arts record from Sherdog

Leah McCourt (born 21 June 1992) is a Northern Irish professional mixed martial artist and submission grappler who competed in the Featherweight division of Bellator MMA.

== Background ==
McCourt, who grew up on a council estate in Belfast, was enrolled in judo as a child by her father. From the age of 11, she quit judo and all her spare time was spent riding ponies and horses, competing around Northern Ireland at places like Balmoral and the Dublin Horseshow. When she was a teenager, McCourt developed an allergy towards horses, leading her to give up riding.

She first started training at a mixed martial arts (MMA) gym aged 18, after giving birth to her daughter Isabella .

McCourt signed an exclusive multi-year fight sports equipment and sports apparel agreement with Everlast is the first female athlete to be placed on an apparel deal from the UK.

== Amateur mixed martial arts career ==
McCourt started her MMA career in Clan Wars MMA, debuting on 7 June 2014 at Clan Wars 19, winning the fight versus Sarah Louise Scott by armbar submission.

On 1 November 2014 McCourt lost from Aoife Murphy at Clan Wars 20 by TKO (punches).

In November 2015, she won the IMMAF - European Open Championships in the 155 lbs division by defeating Sini Koivunen (by armbar submission) and Mia Isola (by unanimous decision).

In November 2016, McCourt won the 2016 IMMAF World Championships after defeating Yvonne Chow (by Kimura submission), Taryn Conklin (by Kimura submission), and Julia Dorny (by TKO).

== Professional mixed martial arts career ==
McCourt made her professional MMA debut on 24 June 2017 at CWFC 85 - Cage Warriors Fighting Championship 85, losing by Rizlen Zouak via TKO (Punches) in Round 2.

On 16 June 2018, McCourt took part at CW 94 - Cage Warriors 94 and won the fight versus Manon Fiorot by split decision.

After this win, McCourt signed a six-fight deal with Bellator MMA.

McCourt made her Bellator debut against Hatice Özyurt at Bellator 217 on 23 February 2019. At weigh-ins, Ozyurt came in at 148lbs and was fined 20 per cent of her fight purse. She won the bout via doctor stoppage after the doctor stopped the fight at the end of the first round due to a cut under Hatice's eye.

McCourt won her sophomore performance on 27 September 2019 at Bellator 227 versus Kerry Hughes by Submission (Rear-Naked Choke).

McCourt faced Judith Ruis at Bellator 240 on 22 February 2020. However, on February 4, it was announced that James Gallagher pulled out of the event due to a back injury, thus a McCourt's bout was bumped to the main event. In the process, she became the first woman to headline a MMA event in Europe. McCourt won the bout via unanimous decision.

After her win against Ruis, McCourt had surgery in two places on her right shoulder, which prevented her from fighting again in 2020.

McCourt faced Janay Harding on 21 May 2021 at Bellator 259. At the weigh-ins, McCourt weighed in at 149.4 pounds, three and a half pounds over the featherweight non-title fight limit. The bout proceeded at catchweight and McCourt was fined a percentage of her purse, which went to her opponent Harding. After McCourt caught Harding with an upkick, McCourt locked in the triangle choke and won the bout in the second round.

McCourt faced Jessica Borga on 1 October 2021 at Bellator 267. She won the one-sided bout via unanimous decision.

McCourt faced Sinead Kavanagh on 25 February 2022 at Bellator 275. McCourt lost the bout via unanimous decision.

McCourt faced Dayana Silva on 23 September 2022 at Bellator 285. She won the fight by unanimous decision.

McCourt faced Cat Zingano on March 31, 2023 at Bellator 293. She lost the fight via unanimous decision.

McCourt faced Sara McMann on October 7, 2023 at Bellator 300. She won the fight by ground and pound TKO in the first round.

McCourt was scheduled to rematch Sinead Kavanagh on March 22, 2024 at Bellator Champions Series 1. On February 20, McCourt announced that she was out of the bout after suffering broken ribs and a torn oblique.

McCourt faced Sara Collins in a Bellator Women's Featherweight title eliminator on September 14, 2024 at Bellator Champions Series 5, losing the fight via a rear-naked choke submission in the first round.

== Submission grappling career ==
McCourt competed and won gold at the 2016 IBJJF World No-Gi Championship in the adult/female/blue belt/medium-heavy division.

McCourt competed at the 2018 IBJJF European No-Gi Championship. After defeating the only other competitor in the adult/female/purple belt/medium-heavy division, she entered and won the adult/female/purple belt/open division.

McCourt competed and won gold at the 2021 IBJJF World No-Gi Championship in the adult/female/brown belt/medium-heavy division.

== Championships and accomplishments ==
=== Amateur mixed martial arts ===
- International Mixed Martial Arts Federation
  - 2016 World Championships, 1st place (145 lbs/women's featherweight)
  - 2015 European Open, 1st place (155 lbs/lightweight female)

=== Submission grappling ===
- International Brazilian Jiu-Jitsu Federation
  - 2021 IBJJF No-Gi World Championship, 1st place (adult/female/brown belt/medium-heavy)
  - 2018 IBJJF No-Gi European Championship, 1st place (adult/female/purple belt/open)
  - 2016 IBJJF No-Gi World Championship, 1st place (adult/female/blue belt/medium-heavy)

== Mixed martial arts record ==
Professional record breakdown
12 matches	8 wins	4 losses
By knockout	2	1
By submission	2	1
By decision	4	2

Res.	Record	Opponent	Method	Event	Date	Round	Time	Location	Notes
Loss	8–4	Sara Collins	Submission (rear-naked choke)	Bellator Champions Series 5	September 14, 2024	1	2:25	London, England	Bellator Women's Featherweight title eliminator.
Win	8–3	Sara McMann	TKO (punches)	Bellator 300	October 7, 2023	1	4:30	San Diego, California, United States	
Loss	7–3	Cat Zingano	Decision (unanimous)	Bellator 293	March 31, 2023	3	5:00	Temecula, California, United States	
Win	7–2	Dayana Silva	Decision (unanimous)	Bellator 285	September 23, 2022	3	5:00	Dublin, Ireland	
Loss	6–2	Sinead Kavanagh	Decision (unanimous)	Bellator 275	February 25, 2022	3	5:00	Dublin, Ireland	
Win	6–1	Jessica Borga	Decision (unanimous)	Bellator 267	October 1, 2021	3	5:00	London, England	
Win	5–1	Janay Harding	Submission (triangle choke)	Bellator 259	May 21, 2021	2	2:42	Uncasville, Connecticut, United States	Catchweight (149.4 lb) bout; McCourt missed weight.
Win	4–1	Judith Ruis	Decision (unanimous)	Bellator 240	February 22, 2020	3	5:00	Dublin, Ireland	
Win	3–1	Kerry Hughes	Submission (rear-naked choke)	Bellator 227	September 27, 2019	1	2:42	Dublin, Ireland	
Win	2–1	Hatice Ozyurt	TKO (doctor stoppage)	Bellator 217	February 23, 2019	1	5:00	Dublin, Ireland	Catchweight (148 lb) bout; Ozyurt missed weight.
Win	1–1	Manon Fiorot	Decision (split)	Cage Warriors 94	June 16, 2018	3	5:00	Antwerp, Belgium	Catchweight (138 lb) bout.
Loss	0–1	Rizlen Zouak	TKO (punches)	Cage Warriors 85	June 24, 2017	2	3:46	Bournemouth, England	Featherweight debut.

== See also ==
- List of female mixed martial artists
