= PFL Madrid: van Steenis vs. Edwards 2 =

Professional Fighters League MMA event in 2026

- The poster for PFL Madrid: van Steenis vs. Edwards 2
- Promotion: Professional Fighters League
- Date: March 20, 2026
- Venue: Palacio Vistalegre
- City: Madrid, Spain

Event chronology
PFL Dubai: Nurmagomedov vs. Davis	PFL Madrid: van Steenis vs. Edwards 2	PFL Pittsburgh: Eblen vs. Battle

PFL Madrid: van Steenis vs. Edwards 2 was a mixed martial arts event produced by the Professional Fighters League that took place on March 20, 2026, at the Palacio Vistalegre in Madrid, Spain.

== Background ==
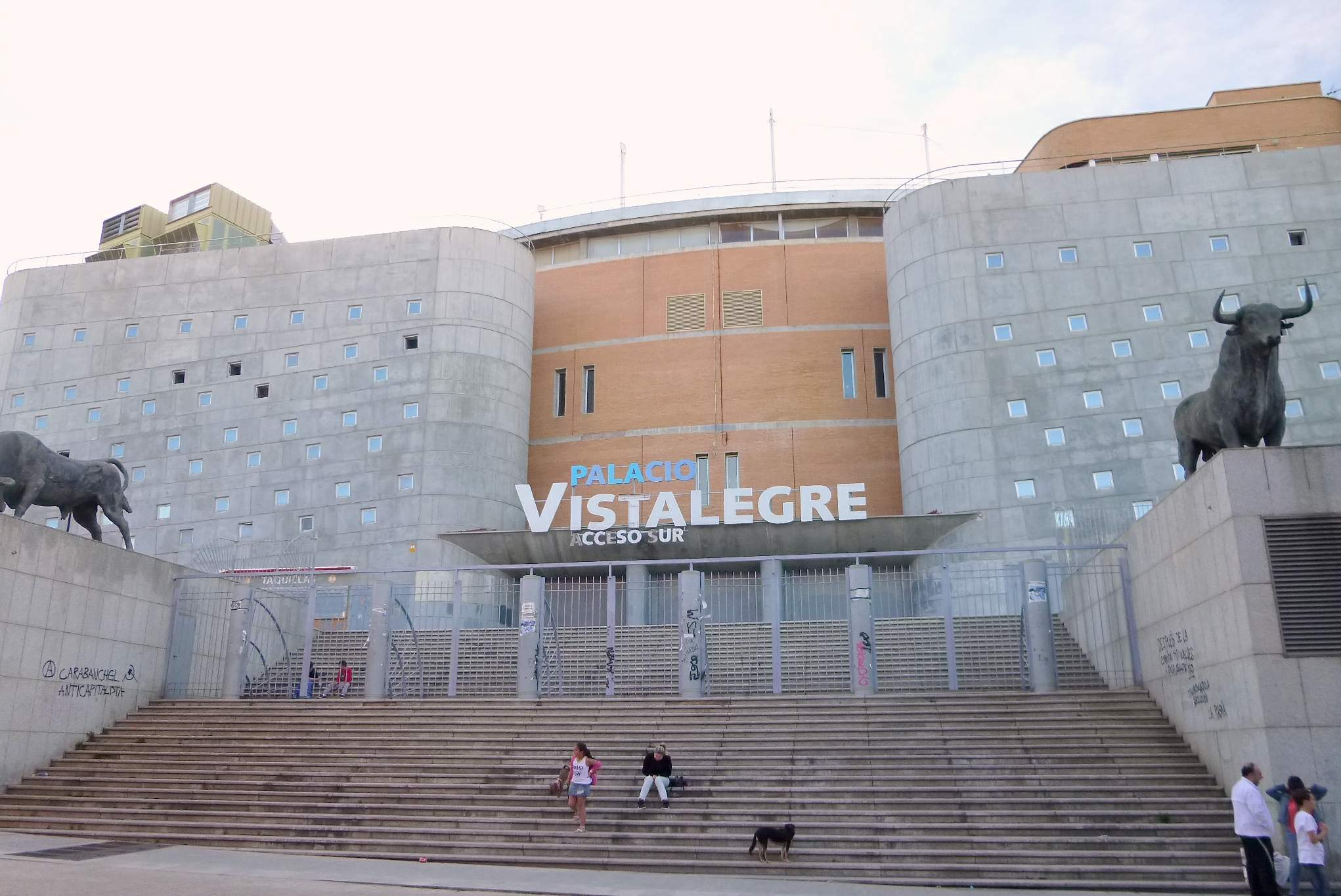
The Palacio Vistalegre hosted the promotion's debut in Spain, which became the 6th country to hold a PFL event in Europe.

A PFL Middleweight Championship bout between current champion Costello van Steenis and Fabian Edwards headlined the event. The pair previously met at Bellator Milan 2 in September 2020, which van Steenis won the bout by split decision.

A heavyweight rematch between Linton Vassell and 2024 PFL Heavyweight Tournament winner Denis Goltsov was scheduled at this event. The pairing previously fought at PFL 1 (2024) in April 2024, which Goltsov won by third-round TKO. However, Goltsov pulled out and was replaced by Bellator veteran José Augusto Azevedo.

At the weigh-ins, two fighters missed weight:

- Kevin Cordero weighed in at 136.6 pounds, 0.6 pounds over the bantamweight limit.
- Mathys Duragrin weighed in at 146.5 pounds, 0.5 pounds over the featherweight limit.

Cordero and Duragrin's bout proceeded at catchweight. Both fighters were fined a percentage of their individual purses which went to their opponents Luciano Pereira and Ignacio Campos respectively.

== Results ==
Main card (ESPN+)
Weight class				Method	Round	Time	Notes
Middleweight	Costello van Steenis (c)	def.	Fabian Edwards	KO (elbows)	3	1:48	(Note: For the PFL Middleweight Championship.)
Featherweight	A. J. McKee	def.	Ádám Borics	Decision (unanimous) (30–27, 30–27, 29–28)	3	5:00
Welterweight	Franco Tenaglia	def.	Yassin Najid	TKO (shoulder injury)	2	5:00
Women's Strawweight	Jacinta Austin	def.	Benita van Rooij	TKO (punches)	1	2:40
Heavyweight	Linton Vassell	def.	José Augusto Azevedo	TKO (punches and elbows)	2	2:48
Preliminary card (ESPN+)
Bantamweight	Luciano Pereira	def.	Kevin Cordero	KO (punches)	1	2:10	(Note: Cordero missed weight (136.6 lb).)
Flyweight	Borja García	def.	Rafael Calderón	Decision (unanimous) (29–28, 29–28, 29–28)	3	5:00
Lightweight	Gino van Steenis	def.	Mark Ewen	KO (punches)	1	2:43
Bantamweight	Mattia Giordano	def.	Ernesto Schisano	Decision (unanimous) (29–28, 29–28, 29–28)	3	5:00
Catchweight (160 lb)	Claudio Pacella	def.	David Mora	Decision (unanimous) (30–27, 30–27, 30–26)	3	5:00
Featherweight	Ignacio Campos	def.	Mathys Duragrin	Decision (unanimous) (29–28, 29–28, 29–28)	3	5:00	(Note: Duragrin missed weight (146.5 lb).)

== See also ==
- 2026 in Professional Fighters League
- List of PFL events
- List of current PFL fighters
