= PFL Champions Series 2 =

Professional Fighters League MMA event in 2025

PFL Champions Series 2: Eblen vs. van Steenis
- The poster for PFL Champions Series 2: Eblen vs. van Steenis
- Promotion: Professional Fighters League
- Date: July 19, 2025
- Venue: GrandWest Arena
- City: Cape Town, South Africa

Event chronology
PFL Europe 2	PFL Champions Series 2: Eblen vs. van Steenis	PFL 8

PFL Champions Series Cape Town: Eblen vs. van Steenis and PFL Africa 1: 2025 First Round was a mixed martial arts event produced by the Professional Fighters League that took place on July 19, 2025, at GrandWest Arena in Cape Town, South Africa.

== Background ==
The event marked the promotion's debut in South Africa, which became the 14th country to held a PFL and WSOF event. This also the first event to held in Africa region. On May 20, the promotion announced that they've changed the date for their from July 26 to July 19 instead.

A PFL Middleweight Championship bout between Johnny Eblen and Costello van Steenis headlined the event.

The event also featured the quarterfinals of 2025 PFL Africa Tournament in a heavyweight and bantamweight divisions.

At the weigh-ins, Shannon van Tonder weighed in at 136.2 pounds, 0.2 pounds over the bantamweight limit and he was fined a percentage of his purse, which went to Boule Godogo.

== Results ==
PFL Champions Series 2 (DAZN / ESPN+)
Weight class				Method	Round	Time	Notes
Middleweight	Costello van Steenis	def.	Johnny Eblen	Technical Submission (rear-naked choke)	5	4:51	(Note: For the inaugural PFL Middleweight Championship.)
Women's Flyweight	Dakota Ditcheva	def.	Sumiko Inaba	Decision (unanimous) (30–27, 30–27, 30–27)	3	5:00
Featherweight	A. J. McKee	def.	Akhmed Magomedov	Decision (unanimous) (30–27, 30–27, 30–27)	3	5:00
Lightweight	Makkasharip Zaynukov	def.	Takeshi Izumi	Decision (unanimous) (30–27, 30–27, 30–27)	3	5:00
Heavyweight	Corey Anderson	def.	Denis Goltsov	TKO (elbows)	2	3:28
2025 PFL Africa 1 (DAZN / PFL App)
Bantamweight	Nkosi Ndebele	def.	Mahmoud Atef	TKO (punches)	1	4:50	(Note: 2025 PFL Africa Bantamweight Tournament Quarterfinal.)
Heavyweight	Maxwell Djantou Nana	def.	Mickaël Groguhe	Decision (unanimous) (30–27, 30–27, 30–27)	3	5:00	(Note: 2025 PFL Africa Heavyweight Tournament Quarterfinal.)
Bantamweight	Boule Godogo	def.	Shannon van Tonder	Decision (split) (30–26, 28–29, 29–27)	3	5:00	(Note: 2025 PFL Africa Bantamweight Tournament Quarterfinal; van Tonder missed weight (136.2 lb).)
Heavyweight	Justin Clarke	def.	Jashell Ticha Awa	TKO (retirement)	1	5:00	(Note: 2025 PFL Africa Heavyweight Tournament Quarterfinal.)
Bantamweight	Karim Henniene	def.	Asiashu Tshitamba	Decision (split) (30–27, 28–29, 29–28)	3	5:00	(Note: 2025 PFL Africa Bantamweight Tournament Quarterfinal.)
Heavyweight	Joffie Houlton	def.	Abdoullah Kane	DQ (illegal knee)	1	0:40	(Note: 2025 PFL Africa Heavyweight Tournament Quarterfinal.)
Bantamweight	Simbarashe Hokonya	def.	Frans Mlambo	Decision (unanimous) (30–26, 30–26, 30–25)	3	5:00	(Note: 2025 PFL Africa Bantamweight Tournament Quarterfinal. Mlambo was deducted one point in round 2 due to illegal elbows to back of head.)
Heavyweight	Abraham Bably	def.	Paul-Emmanuel Gnaze	KO (punch)	1	4:59	(Note: 2025 PFL Africa Heavyweight Tournament Quarterfinal.)
Women's Strawweight	Juliet Ukah	def.	Ceileigh Niedermayr	Decision (unanimous) (30–27, 30–27, 30–27)	3	5:00

== Tournament brackets ==
=== 2025 PFL Africa Heavyweight Tournament ===
Quarter-finals
(Ivory Coast) Paul-Emmanuel Gnaze (Note: Badr Medkouri withdrew from the tournament and was replaced by Paul-Emmanuel Gnaze.)	1
(Ivory Coast) Abraham Bably	KO
(Nigeria) Joffie Houlton (Note: Mohammad Ben Yahia withdrew from the tournament due to an injury and was replaced by Joffie Houlton.)	DQ
(Senegal) Abdoullah Kane	1
(South Africa) Justin Clarke	TKO
(Cameroon) Jashell Ticha Awa	1
(Cameroon) Maxwell Djantou Nana	UD
(Ivory Coast) Mickaël Groguhe	3

Semi-finals
(Ivory Coast) Abraham Bably
(Nigeria) Joffie Houlton
(South Africa) Justin Clarke
(Cameroon) Maxwell Djantou Nana

Final

=== 2025 PFL Africa Bantamweight Tournament ===
Quarter-finals
(South Africa) Nkosi Ndebele	TKO
(Egypt) Mahmoud Atef	1
(South Africa) Frans Mlambo (Note: Alain Majorique withdrew from the tournament and was replaced by Frans Mlambo.)	3
(Zimbabwe) Simbarashe Hokonya	UD
(South Africa) Shannon van Tonder	3
(Democratic Republic of the Congo) Boule Godogo	SD
(South Africa) Asiashu Tshitamba (Note: Antero dos Santos withdrew from the tournament and was replaced by Asiashu Tshitamba.)	3
(Algeria) Karim Henniene	SD

Semi-finals
(South Africa) Nkosi Ndebele
(Zimbabwe) Simbarashe Hokonya
(Democratic Republic of the Congo) Boule Godogo
(Algeria) Karim Henniene

Final

== See also ==
- 2025 in Professional Fighters League
- List of PFL events
- List of current PFL fighters
