= Costello van Steenis =

Dutch mixed martial artist (born 1992)

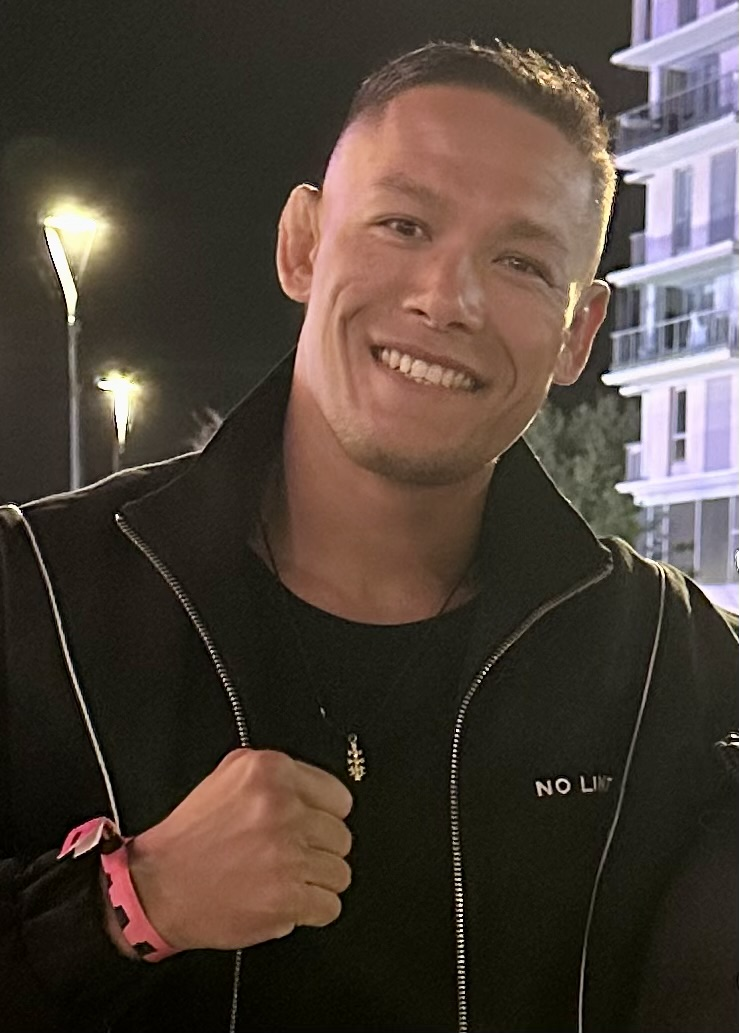
- Costello van Steenis in 2026
- Born: 26 July 1992 (age 34); Rotterdam, Netherlands
- Other names: The Spaniard
- Citizenship: Netherlands; Spain
- Height: 6 ft 1 in (1.85 m)
- Weight: 185 lb (84 kg; 13.2 st)
- Division: Middleweight
- Reach: 76 in (193 cm)
- Fighting out of: Andorra
- Team: MMA Vlaardingen
- Years active: 2014–present

Mixed martial arts record
- Total: 21
- Wins: 18
- By knockout: 6
- By submission: 8
- By decision: 3
- By disqualification: 1
- Losses: 3
- By decision: 3

Other information
- Mixed martial arts record from Sherdog

Costello van Steenis (born 26 July 1992) is a Dutch-Spanish professional mixed martial artist who currently competes in the middleweight division of the PFL, where he is the current and inaugural PFL Middleweight World Champion. Van Steenis has been a professional MMA fighter since 2014 and has previously competed in Bellator MMA. As of January 27, 2026, he is #4 in the PFL men's pound-for-pound rankings.

In April 2026, he reached No. 6 in the middleweight rankings according to Fight Matrix.

== Background ==
Van Steenis was born on 26 July 1992 in Rotterdam, Netherlands to a Dutch father and a Spanish-Filipino mother. He grew up in Spain in the coastal town of Altea. Van Steenis was first introduced to MMA in the nearby town of Benidorm. His trainer recognized that van Steenis was talented and told him he should move to a different country where MMA is more established so he could grow as a fighter. Van Steenis decided to move to the Netherlands and live with his godfather in Vlaardingen. He ended up joining MMA Vlaardingen, training under Ricardo Wondel. He then also joined regular training sessions with Gegard Mousasi's team in Leiden and at Kops Gym in Amsterdam. He considers Mousasi as a mentor and has stated he would not fight him.

== Mixed martial arts career ==
=== Early career ===
Van Steenis began his professional MMA career in 2014. Prior to signing with Bellator MMA, he compiled an 8-1 record, finishing most of his opponents. Up until that point, his only loss came against Jake Bostwick, where van Steenis suffered a fractured eye socket at the beginning of the second round. He lost the fight by unanimous decision.

=== Bellator MMA ===
Making his Bellator debut, van Steenis faced Steve Skrzat on 20 October 2017, at Bellator 185. He won the bout by first-round submission.

Van Steenis faced Kevin Fryer on 25 May 2018, at Bellator 200. He won the fight by first-round TKO.

Van Steenis faced Chris Honeycutt at Bellator 210 on 30 November 2018. He won the bout by split decision.

Van Steenis faced Mike Shipman on 22 June 2019, at Bellator 223. He won the bout by knockout in the second round.

Van Steenis faced John Salter on 8 November 2019, in the main event of Bellator 233. He lost the fight by unanimous decision.

Van Steenis was scheduled to face Fabian Edwards on 16 May 2020, at Bellator London 3. However, the event was cancelled due to the COVID-19 pandemic. The bout was rebooked for 26 September 2020 at Bellator Milan 2. He won the bout by split decision.

Van Steenis faced Kamil Oniszczuk on 29 October 2022, at Bellator 287. He won the bout by submission via brabo choke in the second round.

Van Steenis faced former Bellator Welterweight Champion Douglas Lima on 12 May 2023 at Bellator 296. He lost the bout via unanimous decision.

Van Steenis faced Gregory Babene at Bellator Champions Series 2 on 17 May 2024. He won the fight via submission in the second round.

=== Professional Fighters League ===
Making his PFL debut, van Steenis faced João Vitor Dantas on 29 November 2024, at PFL 10. He won the bout by knockout in the first round.

==== PFL Middleweight Champion ====
Van Steenis faced Bellator Middleweight Champion Johnny Eblen for the inaugural PFL Middleweight Championship on 19 July 2025, at PFL Champions Series 2. He won the title via submission in the final seconds of round five.

Van Steenis made his first title defense against 2025 PFL Middleweight Tournament winner Fabian Edwards in a rematch on 20 March 2026, at PFL Champions Series 6. He won the bout via knockout in the third round.

Van Steenis was scheduled to rematch against Johnny Eblen for the PFL Middleweight Championship on July 18, 2026, at PFL Austin. However, van Steenis withdrew from the bout due to sustained an injury and was replaced by Impa Kasanganay for the interim title.

== Personal life ==
Van Steenis has a scar on his face, caused by a bite of his grandmother's dog when he was two years old. He is the older brother of Gino van Steenis who is also a mixed martial artist.

== Championships and accomplishments ==
=== Mixed martial arts ===
- Professional Fighters League
  - PFL Middleweight Championship (One time, inaugural, current)
    - One successful title defense
- Profesjonalna Liga MMA
  - PLMMA Middleweight Championship (One time)
- Sherdog
  - 2025 Submission of the Year vs. Johnny Eblen at PFL Champions Series 2
- MMA Junkie
  - 2025 Submission of the Yearvs. Johnny Eblen at PFL Champions Series 2
  - 2025 Comeback of the Year vs. Johnny Eblen at PFL Champions Series 2
- MMA Fighting
  - 2025 Submission of the Year vs. Johnny Eblen
- Fight Matrix
  - 2025 Most Lopsided Upset of the Year vs. Johnny Eblen

== Mixed martial arts record ==
Professional record breakdown
21 matches	18 wins	3 losses
By knockout	6	0
By submission	8	0
By decision	3	3
By disqualification	1	0

Res.	Record	Opponent	Method	Event	Date	Round	Time	Location	Notes
Win	18–3	Fabian Edwards	KO (elbows)	PFL Madrid: van Steenis vs. Edwards 2	March 20, 2026	3	1:48	Madrid, Spain	Defended the PFL Middleweight Championship.
Win	17–3	Johnny Eblen	Technical Submission (rear-naked choke)	PFL Champions Series 2	July 19, 2025	5	4:53	Cape Town, South Africa	Won the inaugural PFL Middleweight Championship.
Win	16–3	João Vitor Dantas	KO (head kick)	PFL 10 (2024)	November 29, 2024	1	0:48	Riyadh, Saudi Arabia	
Win	15–3	Gregory Babene	Submission (Von Flue choke)	Bellator Champions Series 2	May 17, 2024	2	2:16	Paris, France	Bellator Middleweight title eliminator.
Loss	14–3	Douglas Lima	Decision (unanimous)	Bellator 296	May 12, 2023	3	5:00	Paris, France	
Win	14–2	Kamil Oniszczuk	Submission (brabo choke)	Bellator 287	October 29, 2022	2	3:02	Milan, Italy	
Win	13–2	Fabian Edwards	Decision (split)	Bellator Milan 2	September 26, 2020	3	5:00	Milan, Italy	
Loss	12–2	John Salter	Decision (unanimous)	Bellator 233	November 8, 2019	3	5:00	Thackerville, Oklahoma, United States	
Win	12–1	Mike Shipman	KO (punches)	Bellator 223	June 22, 2019	2	1:34	London, England	
Win	11–1	Chris Honeycutt	Decision (split)	Bellator 210	November 30, 2018	3	5:00	Thackerville, Oklahoma, United States	
Win	10–1	Kevin Fryer	TKO (punches)	Bellator 200	May 25, 2018	1	1:20	London, England	
Win	9–1	Steve Skrzat	TKO (submission to elbows)	Bellator 185	October 20, 2017	1	2:52	Uncasville, Connecticut, United States	
Win	8–1	Marcin Naruszczka	DQ (illegal kick to downed opponent)	PLMMA 72	March 4, 2017	2	2:35	Łomianki, Poland	Won the PLMMA Middleweight Championship.
Win	7–1	Ronan McKay	Submission (rear-naked choke)	Combat Performance League 1	August 27, 2016	1	2:05	Guildford, England	
Loss	6–1	Jake Bostwick	Decision (unanimous)	Phoenix Fight Night 28	December 12, 2015	3	5:00	Bournemouth, England	For the vacant PFN Middleweight Championship.
Win	6–0	Avi Jack	Submission (triangle choke)	Phoenix Fight Night 27	September 12, 2015	1	3:02	Bournemouth, England	
Win	5–0	Harry McLeman	Submission (triangle choke)	Phoenix Fight Night 26	June 13, 2015	2	1:03	Bournemouth, England	
Win	4–0	Andy Manzolo	TKO (punches)	Phoenix Fight Night 25	March 28, 2015	1	1:00	Bournemouth, England	
Win	3–0	Maarten Wouters	Submission (rear-naked choke)	Staredown FC 9	March 14, 2015	1	3:29	Deurne, Belgium	
Win	2–0	Cenk Toplar	Submission (rear-naked choke)	Strength and Honour 10	October 4, 2014	1	3:12	Dessel, Belgium	
Win	1–0	Andy Peters	Decision (unanimous)	Hoyer's Productions: Battle of the South 12	April 5, 2014	2	5:00	Kerkrade, Netherlands	Middleweight debut.
