= Impa Kasanganay =

American mixed martial arts fighter

- Born: Impa Armand Kasanganay; January 17, 1994 (age 32); Fort Lauderdale, Florida, U.S.
- Other names: Tshilobo
- Height: 5 ft 11 in (1.80 m)
- Weight: 185 lb (84 kg; 13 st 3 lb)
- Division: Light Heavyweight (2023–present); Welterweight (2021–2022); Middleweight (2019–2021, 2022, 2024)
- Reach: 75 in (191 cm)
- Fighting out of: Deerfield Beach, Florida, U.S.
- Team: Kill Cliff FC (2021–present); Gym-O (2019–2021)
- Years active: 2019–present

Mixed martial arts record
- Total: 27
- Wins: 20
- By knockout: 8
- By submission: 3
- By decision: 9
- Losses: 7
- By knockout: 5
- By decision: 2

Other information
- Mixed martial arts record from Sherdog

Impa Armand Kasanganay (born January 17, 1994) is an American mixed martial artist who currently competes in the Light heavyweight division of Professional Fighters League (PFL). He formerly competed in the Welterweight and Middleweight divisions of Ultimate Fighting Championship (UFC). As of January 27, 2026, he is #3 in the PFL middleweight rankings.

== Background ==
Born to Congolese immigrants in Fort Lauderdale, Florida, before moving to North Carolina at the age of 12, he attended Providence High School in Charlotte. He started playing American football his senior year.

Kasanganay played collegiate football at Lenoir-Rhyne University, before turning his attention to the cage. During the beginnings of his MMA career, Impa worked as an accountant and holds three degrees, an associate degree in Business Administration and accounting, a Bachelor's in Accounting and a Bachelor's in Finance.

== Mixed martial arts career ==
=== Early career ===
Making his MMA debut at 864 Fighting Championship, Impa won his first bout via split decision against Garett Fosdyck. Kasanganay would go on to win his next 4 bouts on the regional scene, defeating Dahlen Willson at Island Fights 53 by unanimous decision, tapping out John Lewis in the first round at Island Fights 54, submitting Roger Pratcher via rear-naked choke in the first round at KOTC Rumble On The River 2, and then finally defeating Devorious Tubbs via split decision in his one and only outing with Legacy Fighting Alliance at LFA 71 on July 12, 2019.

=== Dana White’s Contender Series ===
Kasanganay was invited to Dana White's Contender Series 26 on August 27, 2019, where he defeated Kailan Hill via unanimous decision.

After not gaining a UFC contract on his first try, Impa was invited back to Dana White's Contender Series 28 on August 11, 2020, where he defeated Anthony Adams via unanimous decision. With the win, he received a UFC contract.

=== Ultimate Fighting Championship ===
Kasanganay made his UFC debut against Maki Pitolo on August 29, 2020, at UFC Fight Night: Smith vs. Rakić. He won the fight via unanimous decision.

Kasanganay, as a replacement for Abu Azaitar, faced Joaquin Buckley on October 11, 2020, at UFC Fight Night: Moraes vs. Sandhagen. Buckley won the fight in spectacular fashion via spinning back kick knockout in the second round.

Kasanganay faced Sasha Palatnikov on April 10, 2021, at UFC on ABC: Vettori vs. Holland. After hurting Palatnikov, he secured a rear naked choke winning the fight via submission in the second round.

Kasanganay faced Carlston Harris on September 18, 2021, at UFC Fight Night 192. He lost the fight via technical knockout in round one.

On December 2, 2021, it was announced that Kasanganay was no longer on the UFC roster.

=== Post-UFC career ===
On January 19, 2022, news surfaced that Kasanganay had signed a contract with Eagle Fighting Championship. He faced Raimond Magomedaliev at Eagle FC 46 on March 11, 2022. At weigh-ins, Kasanganay weighed in at 179.2 pounds, 3.2 pounds over the super welterweight non-title limit. The bout proceeded at a catchweight and he was fined a percentage of his purse, which went to Raimond. Kasanganay lost the fight via split decision.

Kasanganay faced Jared Gooden at XMMA 5 on July 23, 2022. He won the fight by a first-round TKO stoppage.

=== Professional Fighters League ===
Kasanganay faced Osama Elseady on March 10, 2023 at PFL Challenger Series 15, winning the bout by TKO at the end of the first round, securing a PFL contract.

Kasanganay returned to action three weeks later as he faced Cory Hendricks at PFL 1 on April 1, 2023. He won the fight by unanimous decision.

==== 2023 season ====
Stepping in for a suspended fighter, Kasanganay entered the 2023 season against Tim Caron on June 8, 2023 at PFL 4. He won the fight via an arm-triangle choke submission in the second round.

In the semi-finals, he faced Marthin Hamlet at PFL 7 on August 4, 2023, winning the fight via knockout in the first round to advance to the finals.

In the final, Kasanganay faced Josh Silveira on November 24, 2023 at PFL 10. He won the fight via unanimous decision to win the 2023 PFL Light Heavyweight Championship and $1 million collective dollar prize.

==== 2024 season ====
Kasanganay faced Bellator Middleweight Champion Johnny Eblen in a three round non-title crossover fight, on February 24, 2024, at PFL vs. Bellator. He lost the closely contested bout via split decision.

Kasanganay started the 2024 season against Alex Polizzi on April 12, 2024 at PFL 2. He won the bout by first-round technical knockout.

Kasanganay next faced Jakob Nedoh in the co-main event of PFL 5 on June 21, 2024. He won the fight via TKO at the end of the second round.

Kasanganay faced Josh Silveira in the semifinals of the 2024 Light Heavyweight tournament on August 16, 2024 at PFL 8. He won the fight by unanimous decision.

In the final, Kasanganay faced Dovletdzhan Yagshimuradov on November 29, 2024, at PFL 10. He lost the bout by knockout in the first round.

==== 2025 season ====
On January 15, 2025, it was announced that Kasanganay joined the 2025 PFL World Tournament in a middleweight division.

In the quarterfinal, Kasanganay faced Fabian Edwards on April 18, 2025, at PFL 3. Initially Edwards withdrew from the tournament for unknown reasons and was briefly been replaced by Jordan Newman. Subsequently, it was announced that Edwards was pushed back in his original spot. Kasanganay lost the fight via technical knockout in round two.

Kasanganay faced Andrew Sanchez on August 21, 2025, at PFL 10. He won the bout via technical knockout in the third round.

==== 2026 ====
Kasanganay faced Dalton Rosta on March 28, 2026, at PFL Pittsburgh. He won the fight via knockout in round one.

Replacing an injured Costello van Steenis, Kasanganay faced Johnny Eblen for the interim PFL Middleweight Championship on July 18, 2026, at PFL Austin. He lost the fight via technical knockout in round three.

== Championships and accomplishments ==
- Professional Fighters League
  - 2023 PFL Light Heavyweight Champion
- MMA Fighting
  - 2023 First Team MMA All-Star

== Mixed martial arts record ==
Professional record breakdown
27 matches	20 wins	7 losses
By knockout	8	5
By submission	3	0
By decision	9	2

Res.	Record	Opponent	Method	Event	Date	Round	Time	Location	Notes
Loss	20–7	Johnny Eblen	TKO (elbow and punches)	PFL Austin: Eblen vs. Kasanganay 2	July 18, 2026	3	2:39	Austin, Texas, United States	For the interim PFL Middleweight Championship.
Win	20–6	Dalton Rosta	KO (punches)	PFL Pittsburgh: Eblen vs. Battle	March 28, 2026	1	3:18	Moon Township, Pennsylvania, United States	
Win	19–6	Andrew Sanchez	TKO (punches)	PFL 10 (2025)	August 21, 2025	3	4:31	Hollywood, Florida, United States	
Loss	18–6	Fabian Edwards	TKO (punches)	PFL 3 (2025)	April 18, 2025	2	2:14	Orlando, Florida, United States	Return to Middleweight. 2025 PFL Middleweight Tournament Quarterfinal.
Loss	18–5	Dovletdzhan Yagshimuradov	KO (punches)	PFL 10 (2024)	November 29, 2024	1	0:58	Riyadh, Saudi Arabia	2024 PFL Light Heavyweight Tournament Final.
Win	18–4	Joshua Silveira	Decision (unanimous)	PFL 8 (2024)	August 16, 2024	3	5:00	Hollywood, Florida, United States	2024 PFL Light Heavyweight Tournament Semifinal.
Win	17–4	Jakob Nedoh	TKO (doctor stoppage)	PFL 5 (2024)	June 21, 2024	2	5:00	Salt Lake City, Utah, United States	
Win	16–4	Alex Polizzi	TKO (punches)	PFL 2 (2024)	April 12, 2024	1	3:39	Las Vegas, Nevada, United States	
Loss	15–4	Johnny Eblen	Decision (split)	PFL vs. Bellator	February 24, 2024	3	5:00	Riyadh, Saudi Arabia	Middleweight bout.
Win	15–3	Joshua Silveira	Decision (unanimous)	PFL 10 (2023)	November 24, 2023	5	5:00	Washington, D.C., United States	Won the 2023 PFL Light Heavyweight Tournament.
Win	14–3	Marthin Hamlet	KO (punches)	PFL 7 (2023)	August 4, 2023	1	2:24	San Antonio, Texas, United States	2023 PFL Light Heavyweight Tournament Semifinal.
Win	13–3	Tim Caron	Submission (arm-triangle choke)	PFL 4 (2023)	June 8, 2023	2	3:52	Atlanta, Georgia, United States	
Win	12–3	Cory Hendricks	Decision (unanimous)	PFL 1 (2023)	April 1, 2023	3	5:00	Las Vegas, Nevada, United States	
Win	11–3	Osama Elseady	TKO (punches)	PFL Challenger Series 15	March 10, 2023	1	4:15	Orlando, Florida, United States	Light Heavyweight debut.
Win	10–3	Jared Gooden	TKO (punches)	XMMA 5	July 23, 2022	1	3:16	Columbia, South Carolina, United States	Middleweight bout.
Loss	9–3	Raimond Magomedaliev	Decision (split)	Eagle FC 46	March 11, 2022	3	5:00	Miami, Florida, United States	Catchweight (179.2 lb) bout; Kasanganay missed weight.
Loss	9–2	Carlston Harris	TKO (punches)	UFC Fight Night: Smith vs. Spann	September 18, 2021	1	2:38	Las Vegas, Nevada, United States	
Win	9–1	Sasha Palatnikov	Submission (rear-naked choke)	UFC on ABC: Vettori vs. Holland	April 10, 2021	2	0:26	Las Vegas, Nevada, United States	Welterweight debut.
Loss	8–1	Joaquin Buckley	KO (spinning back kick)	UFC Fight Night: Moraes vs. Sandhagen	October 11, 2020	2	2:03	Abu Dhabi, United Arab Emirates	
Win	8–0	Maki Pitolo	Decision (unanimous)	UFC Fight Night: Smith vs. Rakić	August 29, 2020	3	5:00	Las Vegas, Nevada, United States	
Win	7–0	Anthony Adams	Decision (unanimous)	Dana White's Contender Series 28	August 11, 2020	3	5:00	Las Vegas, Nevada, United States	
Win	6–0	Kailan Hill	Decision (unanimous)	Dana White's Contender Series 26	August 27, 2019	3	5:00	Las Vegas, Nevada, United States	
Win	5–0	Devorious Tubbs	Decision (split)	LFA 71	July 12, 2019	3	5:00	Atlanta, Georgia, United States	
Win	4–0	Roger Pratcher	Submission (rear-naked choke)	KOTC: Rumble On The River 2	May 11, 2019	1	4:30	North Augusta, South Carolina, United States	
Win	3–0	John Lewis	TKO (retirement)	Island Fights 54	March 22, 2019	1	1:58	Panama City Beach, Florida, United States	
Win	2–0	Dahlen Wilson	Decision (unanimous)	Island Fights 53	March 6, 2019	3	5:00	Fort Walton Beach, Florida, United States	
Win	1–0	Garrett Fosdyck	Decision (split)	864 FC: Showcase MMA	January 25, 2019	3	5:00	Johnson City, Tennessee, United States	Middleweight debut.

== See also ==
- List of current PFL fighters
- List of Dana White's Contender Series alumni
- List of male mixed martial artists
