= Bellator Champions Series 2 =

Mixed martial arts event in 2024

Bellator Champions Series 2: Mix vs. Magomedov 2
- The poster for Bellator Champions Series 2: Mix vs. Magomedov 2
- Promotion: Bellator MMA
- Date: May 17, 2024
- Venue: Accor Arena
- City: Paris, France

Event chronology
Bellator Champions Series 1: Anderson vs. Moore	Bellator Champions Series 2: Mix vs. Magomedov 2	Bellator Champions Series 3: Jackson vs. Kuramagomedov

Bellator Champions Series 2: Mix vs. Magomedov 2 (also known as Bellator Champions Series Paris) was a mixed martial arts event produced by Bellator MMA, that took place on May 17, 2024, at the Accor Arena in Paris, France.

== Background ==
The event marked the promotion's fourth visit to Paris and first since Bellator 296 in May 2023.

A Bellator Lightweight World Championship bout between current champion Usman Nurmagomedov and Alexandr Shabliy was expected to headlined the event. However, Nurmagomedov withdrew due to injury and the bout was scrapped.

A Bellator Bantamweight World Championship bout between current champion (also Bellator Bantamweight World Grand Prix winner) Patchy Mix and Magomed Magomedov was expected to take place at the co-main event. Due to the originally main event was cancelled, the bout was promoted to main event instead. The pairing previously met at Bellator 289 in December 2022, which Mix won by second round technical submission.

A welterweight bout between former two-time Glory Welterweight Champion Cédric Doumbé and Derek Anderson was expected to serve as the co-main event. However, Anderson was involved in a hit-and-run accident that severely injured his left foot and withdrew from the bout. He was replaced by former LFA Welterweight Champion Jaleel Willis.

At weigh-ins, Thibault Gouti came in at 157.7 pounds, 1.7 pounds over the lightweight non-title limit. His bout proceeded at catchweight and he was fined a percent of his purse which went to his opponent Archie Colgan.

== Results ==
Main card (MAX / DAZN)
Weight class				Method	Round	Time	Notes
Bantamweight	Patchy Mix (c)	def.	Magomed Magomedov	Decision (split) (46–49, 48–47, 48–47)	5	5:00	(Note: For the Bellator Bantamweight World Championship.)
Catchweight (175 lbs)	Cédric Doumbé	def.	Jaleel Willis	TKO (punches)	1	3:33
Middleweight	Costello van Steenis	def.	Gregory Babene	Submission (Von Flue choke)	2	2:16	(Note: Bellator Middleweight title eliminator.)
Featherweight	Yves Landu	def.	Jonas Bilharinho	Decision (split) (29–28, 28–29, 30–27)	3	5:00
Lightweight	Archie Colgan	def.	Thibault Gouti	Decision (unanimous) (30–27, 30–26, 30–26)	3	5:00	(Note: Gouti missed weight (157.7 lb).)
Preliminary card (MAX)
Heavyweight	Slim Trabelsi	def.	Louis Sutherland	Decision (unanimous) (30–27, 30–27, 30–27)	3	5:00
Lightweight	Mansour Barnaoui	def.	Yusuke Yachi	Submission (brabo choke)	1	4:08
Middleweight	Mike Shipman	def.	Steven Hill	TKO (retirement)	1	5:00
Women's Featherweight	Aspen Ladd	def.	Ekaterina Shakalova	Decision (unanimous) (29–28, 30–27, 29–28)	3	5:00
Featherweight	Asaël Adjoudj	def.	Bruno Fontes	TKO (punches)	2	1:11

== See also ==
- 2024 in Bellator MMA
- List of Bellator MMA events
- List of current Bellator fighters
