= Fabian Edwards =

Jamaican-English mixed martial arts fighter

- Born: 24 March 1993 (age 33); Kingston, Jamaica
- Height: 6 ft 1 in (1.85 m)
- Weight: 185 lb (84 kg; 13 st 3 lb)
- Division: Middleweight
- Reach: 79 1/2 in (202 cm)
- Fighting out of: Erdington, Birmingham, England
- Team: Team Renegade BJJ & MMA (2015–present); Ultimate Training Centre (2010–2015)
- Rank: Black belt in Brazilian Jiu-Jitsu
- Years active: 2017–present

Mixed martial arts record
- Total: 21
- Wins: 16
- By knockout: 6
- By submission: 3
- By decision: 7
- Losses: 5
- By knockout: 2
- By decision: 3

Other information
- Notable relatives: Leon Edwards (brother)
- Mixed martial arts record from Sherdog

Fabian Edwards (born 24 March 1993) is an English professional mixed martial artist who competes in the Middleweight division of the Professional Fighters League (PFL), where he is the 2025 PFL Middleweight Tournament Champion. He is the younger brother of former UFC Welterweight Champion Leon Edwards. As of January 27, 2026, he is #2 in the PFL middleweight rankings.

== Background ==
Edwards was born in Kingston, Jamaica, where he and his family shared a single bed, one room, and a wooden house. They were living in squalor without realising it. Edwards's father was the boss of a neighbourhood gang, going by the name "The General." Edwards became desensitised to gun violence since it occurred so frequently in his neighbourhood where gang and criminal activity were rife. Gunshots were commonplace. When Edwards was seven years old, his parents divorced, and his father was already residing in London while continuing to provide for the family financially from afar. They relocated to England to be closer to him, first to London and then to Aston, Birmingham. There were gangs there as well, and until they discovered MMA and formed Team Renegade, they spent their time blending in. Fabian started MMA five to six years after Leon, at the age of 16, due to the insistence of his brother.

When Edwards was eleven, his father was shot dead in a London nightclub.

== Mixed martial arts career ==
=== Early career ===
Prior to going pro, he had a 9–0 record as an amateur. He rose up the ranks by working as a janitor and a carpenter. He did not leave his janitorial position until after signing his first deal with Bellator, at which point he believed his MMA career was already well started. The younger Edwards alternated between a day job and a fighting career for many years, working both jobs to exhaustion. But someday, he assured them, "I'd be making enough money not to do that. I simply persisted, and it sort of paid off.

Before joining the British organisation BAMMA, he made his professional MMA debut with Bellator on 19 May 2017 against Rafał Cejrowski, winning by flying knee knockout in the first round. He reeled off five straight stoppages under the BAMMA promotion to start off his career in style. Starting with Aaron Kennedy via rear-naked choke at BAMMA 30, Louis King via rear-naked choke at BAMMA 33, Kent Kauppinen via armbar at BAMMA 34, and finally Claudio Conti via body kick TKO at BAMMA 35.

=== Bellator MMA ===
After his highlight flying knee knockout, Edwards signed a multi-fight deal with Bellator.

Edwards faced Lee Chadwick on 9 February 2019 at Bellator Newcastle, defeating the experienced veteran via unanimous decision.

Debuting in his hometown for the first time, Edwards faced Falco Neto on 4 May 2019 at Bellator Birmingham, defeating Neto in highlight fashion, landing multiple upkicks on Neto that knocked him down, afterwards being finished by Edwards on the ground. Neto later tested positive for metabolites of methyltestosterone and nandrolone and was handed down a six-month suspension.

After the win, Edwards signed a new deal with Bellator and in his first bout of the deal faced Jonathan Bosuku on 22 June 2019 at Bellator 223. He won the bout via unanimous decision.

Edwards faced Mike Shipman on 23 November 2019 at Bellator London 2, defeating him in a close bout via split decision.

After initially being booked against Costello van Steenis for 16 May 2020 at Bellator London 3, the event was cancelled due to the COVID pandemic. The bout was rebooked for 26 September 2020 at Bellator Milan 2, where Fabian lost his first bout in his career via split decision.

Edwards faced Austin Vanderford on 21 May 2021 at Bellator 259, losing the bout via unanimous decision.

Edwards, as a replacement for Norbert Növényi Jr., was scheduled to face Charlie Ward at Bellator 270 on 5 November 2021. Ward had to pull out however due to a ruptured bicep and was replaced by promotional newcomer Robert Fonseca. Fonseca couldn't get paperwork sorted in time and the bout was scratched, with no replacement sought.

Edwards was scheduled to face Marian Dimitrov at Bellator 275 on 25 February 2022. However, the bout was scrapped a week before for unknown reason. Edwards was rebooked against Lyoto Machida at Bellator London.

Edwards faced former UFC Light Heavyweight Champion Lyoto Machida on 13 May 2022 at Bellator 281. He won the fight via knockout in the first round, catching Machida with an elbow after breaking from a clinch.

Edwards faced Charlie Ward on 29 October 2022 at Bellator 287. He won the bout via unanimous decision.

Edwards faced Gegard Mousasi in a Bellator Middleweight title eliminator fight on 12 May 2023, at Bellator 296. He won the fight via unanimous decision.

Edwards faced Johnny Eblen for the Bellator Middleweight Championship on 23 September 2023, at Bellator 299. He lost the fight via knockout in the third round.

Edwards faced Aaron Jeffery on 22 March 2024, at Bellator Champions Series 1. In a bout filled with lots of clinching against the fence, Edwards came out with a unanimous decision victory.

Edwards was scheduled to rematch Johnny Eblen for the Bellator Middleweight Championship on 14 September 2024, at Bellator Champions Series 5. On 3 September the bout was rescheduled for a later date with no reason given. The bout was rebooked to take place on 19 October 2024 at PFL Super Fights: Battle of the Giants. Edwards lost the fight by unanimous decision.

=== Professional Fighters League ===
On 25 February 2025 the promotion officially revealed that Edwards joined the 2025 PFL Middleweight Tournament.

In the quarterfinal, Edwards faced Impa Kasanganay on 18 April 2025 at PFL 3. Initially Edwards withdrew from the tournament for unknown reasons and was briefly been replaced by Jordan Newman. Subsequently, it was announced that Edwards was pushed back in his original spot. He won the fight via technical knockout in round two.

In the semifinals, Edwards faced Josh Silveira at PFL 7 on 27 June 2025. He won the fight via unanimous decision.

Edwards faced Dalton Rosta in the final at PFL 10 on 21 August 2025. He won the fight via head kick knockout in the third round.

Edwards faced Costello van Steenis in a rematch for the PFL Middleweight Championship on 20 March 2026, at PFL Champions Series 6. He lost the bout via knockout in the third round.

== Championships and accomplishments ==
=== Mixed martial arts ===
- Professional Fighters League
  - 2025 PFL Middleweight Tournament Champion

== Mixed martial arts record ==
Professional record breakdown
21 matches	16 wins	5 losses
By knockout	6	2
By submission	3	0
By decision	7	3

Res.	Record	Opponent	Method	Event	Date	Round	Time	Location	Notes
Loss	16–5	Costello van Steenis	KO (elbows)	PFL Madrid: van Steenis vs. Edwards 2	March 20, 2026	3	1:48	Madrid, Spain	For the PFL Middleweight Championship.
Win	16–4	Dalton Rosta	KO (head kick)	PFL 10 (2025)	August 21, 2025	3	1:28	Hollywood, Florida, United States	Won the 2025 PFL Middleweight Tournament.
Win	15–4	Josh Silveira	Decision (unanimous)	PFL 7 (2025)	June 27, 2025	3	5:00	Chicago, Illinois, United States	2025 PFL Middleweight Tournament Semifinal.
Win	14–4	Impa Kasanganay	TKO (punches)	PFL 3 (2025)	April 18, 2025	2	2:14	Orlando, Florida, United States	2025 PFL Middleweight Tournament Quarterfinal.
Loss	13–4	Johnny Eblen	Decision (unanimous)	PFL Super Fights: Battle of the Giants	October 19, 2024	5	5:00	Riyadh, Saudi Arabia	For the Bellator Middleweight World Championship.
Win	13–3	Aaron Jeffery	Decision (unanimous)	Bellator Champions Series 1	22 March 2024	3	5:00	Belfast, Northern Ireland	Bellator Middleweight title eliminator.
Loss	12–3	Johnny Eblen	KO (punches)	Bellator 299	23 September 2023	3	0:21	Dublin, Ireland	For the Bellator Middleweight World Championship.
Win	12–2	Gegard Mousasi	Decision (unanimous)	Bellator 296	12 May 2023	5	5:00	Paris, France	Bellator Middleweight title eliminator.
Win	11–2	Charlie Ward	Decision (unanimous)	Bellator 287	29 October 2022	3	5:00	Milan, Italy	
Win	10–2	Lyoto Machida	KO (elbow and punches)	Bellator 281	13 May 2022	1	3:18	London, England	
Loss	9–2	Austin Vanderford	Decision (unanimous)	Bellator 259	21 May 2021	3	5:00	Uncasville, Connecticut, United States	
Loss	9–1	Costello van Steenis	Decision (split)	Bellator Milan 2	26 September 2020	3	5:00	Milan, Italy	
Win	9–0	Mike Shipman	Decision (split)	Bellator London 2	23 November 2019	3	5:00	London, England	
Win	8–0	Jonathan Bosuku	Decision (unanimous)	Bellator 223	22 June 2019	3	5:00	London, England	
Win	7–0	Falco Neto	TKO (upkicks and punches)	Bellator Birmingham	4 May 2019	1	3:51	Birmingham, England	
Win	6–0	Lee Chadwick	Decision (unanimous)	Bellator Newcastle	9 February 2019	3	5:00	Newcastle, England	
Win	5–0	Claudio Conti	TKO (body kick)	BAMMA 35	12 May 2018	1	1:00	Dublin, Ireland	
Win	4–0	Kent Kauppinen	Submission (armbar)	BAMMA 34	18 March 2018	1	4:52	London, England	
Win	3–0	Louis King	Submission (rear-naked choke)	BAMMA 33	15 December 2017	1	1:15	Newcastle, England	
Win	2–0	Aaron Kennedy	Submission (rear-naked choke)	BAMMA 30	7 July 2017	2	0:44	Dublin, Ireland	
Win	1–0	Rafał Cejrowski	KO (flying knee)	Bellator 179	19 May 2017	1	3:44	London, England	Middleweight debut.

== See also ==
- List of current Bellator MMA fighters
- List of male mixed martial artists
