= Johnny Eblen =

American mixed martial arts fighter (born 1991)

- Born: December 13, 1991 (age 34); Des Moines, Iowa, U.S.
- Other names: Pressure
- Height: 6 ft 1 in (185 cm)
- Weight: 185 lb (84 kg; 13 st 3 lb)
- Division: Middleweight
- Reach: 74 in (188 cm)
- Style: Wrestling
- Fighting out of: Coconut Creek, Florida
- Team: American Top Team (2016–present)
- Wrestling: NCAA Division I Wrestling
- Years active: 2017–present

Mixed martial arts record
- Total: 19
- Wins: 18
- By knockout: 7
- By submission: 2
- By decision: 9
- Losses: 1
- By submission: 1

Amateur record
- Total: 3
- Wins: 3
- By submission: 1
- By decision: 2

Other information
- University: University of Missouri
- Mixed martial arts record from Sherdog

Johnny Eblen (born December 13, 1991) is an American professional mixed martial artist who currently competes in the Middleweight division of the Professional Fighters League, where he is current interim PFL Middleweight Champion. He formerly competed in Bellator MMA, where he was the last Bellator Middleweight World Champion. As of January 27, 2026, he is #1 in the PFL middleweight rankings and as of April 21, 2026, he is #7 in the PFL men's pound-for-pound rankings.

== Background ==
Eblen, born to a Korean mother and American father, was a state wrestling champion while at Park Hill High School in Kansas City. He has an older brother, Tommy, who is also a mixed martial artist. Eblen wrestled collegiately at the University of Missouri, where he became an NCAA qualifier in 2015 and a two-time Academic All-MAC Team member, posting three 20-win campaigns and compiled an 87–24 career record. His time in college was also marked with injuries, as in the summer prior to college, Eblen suffered a fractured fibula and also tore several ligaments in his ankle, forcing him to redshirt his freshman season. In his sophomore season, Eblen suffered extreme dehydration during a 7-mile run ended up in the ICU for three days, before tearing his meniscus in his knee, less than a month later, requiring another surgery. Before his junior year, he suffered a dislocated shoulder which would eventually lead him his season ending before the start of the MAC Tournament after reinjuring it. In his senior season, he cut down to 174, and was a starter on No.1 ranked Tigers, becoming an NCAA qualifier.

After graduation from Missouri in 2015, Eblen relocated to Florida to take a non-MMA related job, working full time at a paving company and coaching wrestling on the side. When he met Steve Mocco, a former Olympic wrestler and American Top Team coach, at a wrestling practice, he was invited to visit ATT to check it out.

== Mixed martial arts career ==
=== Early career ===
Eblen started his professional MMA career under the banner of Shamrock FC, making his debut at Shamrock FC 291, winning the bout against Wayne Collier via TKO in the first round. Eblen would defeat his next two opponents, Raymond Gray and Wayman Carter, via first round stoppages at Shamrock FC 298 and Shamrock FC 308 respectively, before winning what would be his last bout for the promotion at Shamrock FC 310, via a 1-round "Submission from strikes" against Tyler Lee .

=== Bellator MMA ===
Eblen made his promotional debut against Chauncey Foxworth on March 22, 2019, at Bellator 218. He won the bout via unanimous decision.

In his sophomore performance against Mauricio Alonso on October 4, 2019, at Bellator 229, he won the bout via unanimous decision.

Eblen faced Taylor Johnson on October 29, 2020, at Bellator 250, winning the bout via unanimous decision.

Picking up his first stoppage victory with the promotion, Eblen knocked out Daniel Madrid in the first round on May 7, 2021, at Bellator 258.

As the first bout of his new four-fight contract, Eblen faced Travis Davis on July 16, 2021, at Bellator 262. He won the bout via unanimous decision.

In his 6th bout with the promotion, Eblen defeated Collin Huckbody on December 3, 2021, at Bellator 272 via first-round TKO stoppage.

As the first bout his new six-fight contract, Eblen faced John Salter on March 12, 2022, at Bellator 276. He won the bout via unanimous decision.

==== Bellator Middleweight champion ====
Eblen faced Gegard Mousasi for the Bellator Middleweight Championship at Bellator 282 on June 24, 2022. He won the bout and the title via a 50-45 unanimous decision on all judges' scorecards. Following this victory, Eblen was ranked as the fourth best middleweight by Fight Matrix and eight by Sherdog.

Eblen made his first title defense against Anatoly Tokov on February 4, 2023, at Bellator 290. He won the bout via unanimous decision.

Eblen defended his title against Fabian Edwards on September 23, 2023, at Bellator 299. He won the fight via knockout in the third round.

Eblen faced 2023 PFL Light Heavyweight champion Impa Kasanganay in a three-round non-title crossover fight, on February 24, 2024, at PFL vs. Bellator. He won the closely contested bout vis split decision.

Eblen was scheduled to face Fabian Edwards in a rematch on September 14, 2024, at Bellator Champions Series 5. On September 3, the bout was rescheduled for a later date with no reason given. The bout was rebooked to take place on October 19, 2024, at PFL Super Fights: Battle of the Giants. Eblen won the fight by unanimous decision.

=== Professional Fighters League ===
Eblen faced Costello van Steenis for the inaugural PFL Middleweight Championship on July 19, 2025, at PFL Champions Series 2. He lost the bout via submission in the final seconds of round five.

Eblen faced Bryan Battle on March 28, 2026, at PFL Pittsburgh. He won the fight via a rear-naked choke in round one.

Eblen was scheduled to rematch against Costello van Steenis for the PFL Middleweight Championship on July 18, 2026, at PFL Austin. However, van Steenis withdrew from the bout due to sustained an injury and was replaced by Impa Kasanganay for the interim title. He won the fight via technical knockout in round three.

== Championships and accomplishments ==
=== Mixed martial arts ===
- Professional Fighters League
  - Interim PFL Middleweight World Championship (One time, current)
- Bellator MMA
  - Bellator Middleweight World Championship (One time; final)
    - Three successful title defences
  - PFL vs. Bellator Champions of Champions Super Belt (One time)

== Mixed martial arts record ==
Professional record breakdown
| 19 matches | 18 wins | 1 loss |
| By knockout | 7 | 0 |
| By submission | 2 | 1 |
| By decision | 9 | 0 |

| Res. | Record | Opponent | Method | Event | Date | Round | Time | Location | Notes |
|---|---|---|---|---|---|---|---|---|---|
| Win | 18–1 | Impa Kasanganay | TKO (elbow and punches) | PFL Austin: Eblen vs. Kasanganay 2 | July 18, 2026 | 3 | 2:39 | Austin, Texas, United States | Won the interim PFL Middleweight Championship. |
| Win | 17–1 | Bryan Battle | Submission (rear-naked choke) | PFL Pittsburgh: Eblen vs. Battle | March 28, 2026 | 1 | 4:10 | Moon Township, Pennsylvania, United States | |
| Loss | 16–1 | Costello van Steenis | Technical Submission (rear-naked choke) | PFL Champions Series 2 | July 19, 2025 | 5 | 4:53 | Cape Town, South Africa | For the inaugural PFL Middleweight World Championship. |
| Win | 16–0 | Fabian Edwards | Decision (unanimous) | PFL Super Fights: Battle of the Giants | October 19, 2024 | 5 | 5:00 | Riyadh, Saudi Arabia | Defended the Bellator Middleweight World Championship. |
| Win | 15–0 | Impa Kasanganay | Decision (split) | PFL vs. Bellator | February 24, 2024 | 3 | 5:00 | Riyadh, Saudi Arabia | |
| Win | 14–0 | Fabian Edwards | KO (punches) | Bellator 299 | September 23, 2023 | 3 | 0:21 | Dublin, Ireland | Defended the Bellator Middleweight World Championship. |
| Win | 13–0 | Anatoly Tokov | Decision (unanimous) | Bellator 290 | February 4, 2023 | 5 | 5:00 | Inglewood, California, United States | Defended the Bellator Middleweight World Championship. |
| Win | 12–0 | Gegard Mousasi | Decision (unanimous) | Bellator 282 | June 24, 2022 | 5 | 5:00 | Uncasville, Connecticut, United States | Won the Bellator Middleweight World Championship. |
| Win | 11–0 | John Salter | Decision (unanimous) | Bellator 276 | March 12, 2022 | 3 | 5:00 | St. Louis, Missouri, United States | |
| Win | 10–0 | Collin Huckbody | TKO (punches) | Bellator 272 | December 3, 2021 | 1 | 1:11 | Uncasville, Connecticut, United States | |
| Win | 9–0 | Travis Davis | Decision (unanimous) | Bellator 262 | July 16, 2021 | 3 | 5:00 | Uncasville, Connecticut, United States | |
| Win | 8–0 | Daniel Madrid | KO (punches) | Bellator 258 | May 7, 2021 | 1 | 2:44 | Uncasville, Connecticut, United States | |
| Win | 7–0 | Taylor Johnson | Decision (unanimous) | Bellator 250 | October 29, 2020 | 3 | 5:00 | Uncasville, Connecticut, United States | |
| Win | 6–0 | Mauricio Alonso | Decision (unanimous) | Bellator 229 | October 4, 2019 | 3 | 5:00 | Temecula, California, United States | |
| Win | 5–0 | Chauncey Foxworth | Decision (unanimous) | Bellator 218 | March 22, 2019 | 3 | 5:00 | Thackerville, Oklahoma, United States | |
| Win | 4–0 | Tyler Lee | TKO (submission to punches) | Shamrock FC 310 | October 13, 2018 | 1 | 2:14 | Kansas City, Missouri, United States | |
| Win | 3–0 | Wayman Carter | Submission (guillotine choke) | Shamrock FC 308 | August 18, 2018 | 1 | 1:37 | St. Louis, Missouri, United States | |
| Win | 2–0 | Raymond Gray | TKO (submission to punches) | Shamrock FC 298 | November 18, 2017 | 1 | 2:21 | Kansas City, Missouri, United States | |
| Win | 1–0 | Wayne Collier | TKO (submission to punches) | Shamrock FC 291 | July 7, 2017 | 1 | 1:01 | Kansas City, Missouri, United States | |

== See also ==
- List of current Bellator fighters
- List of male mixed martial artists
