= Bellator 299 =

MMA event

Bellator 299: Eblen vs. Edwards
- The poster for Bellator 299: Eblen vs. Edwards
- Promotion: Bellator MMA
- Date: September 23, 2023
- Venue: 3Arena
- City: Dublin, Ireland

Event chronology
Bellator 298: Storley vs. Ward	Bellator 299: Eblen vs. Edwards	Bellator 300: Nurmagomedov vs. Primus

Bellator 299: Eblen vs. Edwards (also known as Bellator Dublin) was a mixed martial arts event produced by Bellator MMA, that took place on September 23, 2023, at the 3Arena in Dublin, Ireland.

== Background ==
The event marked the promotion's 10th visit to Dublin and first since Bellator 291 in February 2023.

A Bellator Middleweight World Championship bout between current champion Johnny Eblen and Fabian Edwards headlined the event.

A women's featherweight bout between Sinead Kavanagh and Sara Collins took place at the event.

Khasan Magomedsharipov was scheduled to face Martin McDonough in the featherweight bout, however his opponent pulled out and was replaced by Piotr Niedzielski. At weigh-ins, Niedzielski weighed in at 147.8 pounds, 1.8 pounds over the featherweight non-title limit. Due to this, the bout proceeded at catchweight and he was fined 20 percent of his purse, which went to Magomedsharipov.

== Results ==
Main Card (Showtime)
Weight class				Method	Round	Time	Notes
Middleweight	Johnny Eblen (c)	def.	Fabian Edwards	KO (elbows and punches)	3	0:21	(Note: For the Bellator Middleweight World Championship.)
Featherweight	Aaron Pico	def.	Pedro Carvalho	TKO (punches)	1	3:05
Women's Featherweight	Sara Collins	def.	Sinead Kavanagh	Decision (split) (29–28, 28–29, 29–28)	3	5:00
Featherweight	Mads Burnell	def.	Daniel Weichel	Decision (unanimous) (29–28, 30–27, 30–27)	3	5:00
Welterweight	Levan Chokheli	def.	Sabah Homasi	KO (front kick)	1	1:51
Preliminary card (Youtube/Pluto TV)
Welterweight	Peter Queally	vs.	Daniele Miceli	No Contest (illegal soccer kick)	1	0:26	(Note: Accidental illegal soccer kick rendered Queally unable to continue.)
Lightweight	Jay-Jay Wilson	def.	Mansour Barnaoui	Decision (unanimous) (29–28, 29–28, 29–28)	3	5:00
Middleweight	Grégory Babene	def.	Charlie Ward	Submission (guillotine choke)	1	1:03
Catchweight (140 lb)	Ciarán Clarke	def.	Przemysław Górny	Submission (arm-triangle choke)	2	2:52
Welterweight	Luca Poclit	def.	Roman Faraldo	Submission (brabo choke)	1	2:18
Catchweight (147.8 lb)	Khasan Magomedsharipov	def.	Piotr Niedzielski	Submission (arm-triangle choke)	2	3:58	(Note: Niedzielski missed weight (147.8 lb))
Featherweight	Darragh Kelly	def.	Jelle Zeegers	TKO (punches)	3	3:42
Featherweight	Otto Rodrigues	def.	Brian Moore	Submission (arm triangle choke)	2	1:31
Lightweight	Attila Korkmaz	def.	Davy Gallon	TKO (head kick and punches)	3	0:23
Featherweight	Asaël Adjoudj	def.	Ibrahim Al-Faqih Hassan	Decision (unanimous) (30–27, 30–27, 29–28)	3	5:00
Featherweight	Josh O'Connor	def.	Kenny Mokhonoana	Decision (unanimous) (30–27, 30–26, 30–26)	3	5:00
Welterweight	Romain Debienne	def.	Nicolò Solli	KO (punches)	1	0:39
Heavyweight	Sergey Bilostenniy	def.	Kasim Aras	TKO (spinning wheel kick and punches)	1	2:33
Lightweight	Mark Ewen	def.	Noah Gugnon	TKO (elbows and punches)	2	3:51
Women's Strawweight	Mackenzie Stiller	def.	Chiara Penco	Decision (unanimous) (29–28, 29–28, 29–28)	3	5:00

== See also ==
- 2023 in Bellator MMA
- List of Bellator MMA events
- List of current Bellator fighters
