= List of current PFL fighters =

List of current PFL fighters records current PFL fighters' information, country origins, recent fighter signings and departures, fight schedules and results and the champion of each division. Unlike the UFC, PFL does allow its fighters to compete in other promotions, so many fighters on this list may appear in MMA events outside of PFL.

== Background ==
The Professional Fighters League, formerly known as the World Series of Fighting prior to April 2017, is an American mixed martial arts (MMA) promotion that was started in 2012 and based in Washington, District of Columbia. This list is an up-to-date roster of those fighters currently under contract with the PFL brand. Fighters are organized by weight class and within their weight class by their number of fights with the promotion.

As of 2026, PFL operates yearly fights in 10 divisions; Heavyweight, Light Heavyweight, Middleweight, Welterweight, Lightweight, Featherweight, Bantamweight, Women's Featherweight, Women's Flyweight and Women's Straweight. PFL also runs 2 regional leagues in Africa and MENA (Middle East and North Africa).

== Recent releases and retirements ==
These fighters have either been released from their PFL contracts, or announced their retirement, over the course of the last month. If their release has not been announced, then they have been listed here based upon their removal from the PFL roster.

Date	ISO	Name	Nickname	Reason	Division	Ref	PFL record	MMA record
Nov 11, 2026	(Australia)	Rob Wilkinson	Razor	Released	Light Heavyweight		7–3 (1)	20–5 (1)
Nov 11, 2026	(Australia)	Chelsea Hackett	Hammer	Released	Women's Flyweight		2–3	5–4–1

== Recent signings ==
The fighters in this section have either signed with PFL, have recently returned from an announced retirement, or have yet to make their PFL debut.

Date	ISO	Name	Nickname	Division	Status / next fight / Info	Ref	MMA record
May 29, 2026	(Venezuela)	Mauricio Partida	The Hammer	Bantamweight			11–0
June 7, 2026	(United States)	Avery Guidebeck		Lightweight			0–0
June 11, 2026	(Argentina)	Valeria Ramírez	Foxy	Women's Strawweight			10–1
June 11, 2026	(Republic of Ireland)	Leon Hill	The Hitman	Welterweight			10–2
June 18, 2026	(Brazil)	Fellipe Oliveira	Capanema	Bantamweight			10–1
June 24, 2026	(France)	Ilian Bouafia	The Gorilla	Middleweight	PFL Lyon - Fabian Edwards		8–1
June 24, 2026	(France)	Brandon Brachet	Snatch	Lightweight			9–1
June 24, 2026	(Russia)	Marina Merchuk	Armata	Women's Strawweight			7–2
June 24, 2026	(United States)	Max Metzgar	Mad	Lightweight			6–0
June 24, 2026	(Burundi)	Zacharia Nishimwe		Light Heavyweight	(July 30) Not Cleared - Out of PFL New York - Moustapha Diakhaté		4–0
Sep 10, 2026	(France)	Bafode Gassama	Baidoneus	Heavyweight			4–0
Sep 11, 2026	(Kyrgyzstan)	Kubanychbek Abdisalam Uulu	Omok	Lightweight			23–3 (1)

== Suspended fighters ==
The list below is based on fighters suspended either by (1) United States Anti-Doping Agency (USADA) or World Anti-Doping Agency (WADA) for violation of taking prohibited substances or non-analytical incidents, (2) by local commissions on misconduct during the fights or at event venues, or (3) by PFL.

ISO	Name	Nickname	Division	From	Duration	Tested positive for / Info	By	Eligible to fight again	Ref.	Notes

== Rankings ==
The PFL rankings are rated by a panel made up of MMA media members. The panel votes for the top active fighters in the PFL by both weight class and pound-for-pound. A fighter can be ranked in multiple divisions simultaneously in divisions they have competed in. The champions and interim champions are placed in the top positions of their respective weight classes and only the champions are eligible to be voted for in the pound-for-pound rankings.

The rankings for the PFL's fighters are recorded and updated when information is obtained from the PFL's website. If the website is not updated, the updated data from the UFC's official app will be used instead.

Updated as of September 10, 2026.

Rank	Men's pound-for-pound	Bantamweight	Featherweight	Lightweight	Welterweight
(C)			Razhabali Shaydullaev	Usman Nurmagomedov	Thad Jean
1	Usman Nurmagomedov	Mitchell McKee	A.J. McKee	Alexandr Shabliy	Shamil Musaev
2	Vadim Nemkov	Renat Khavalov	Timur Khizriev	Gadzhi Rabadanov	Magomed Umalatov
3	Corey Anderson	Taylor Lapilus	Jesus Pinedo	Alfie Davis	Abdoul Abdouraguimov
4	Costello van Steenis	Sergio Pettis	Salamat Isbulaev	Archie Colgan	Patrick Habirora
5	Thad Jean	Lazaro Dayron	Gabriel Braga	Jakub Kaszuba	Omar El Dafrawy
6	A.J. McKee	Sarvarjon Khamidov	Ibragim Ibragimov	Paul Hughes	Florim Zendeli
7	Johnny Eblen	Magomed Magomedov	Ádám Borics	Jay-Jay Wilson	Ernesto Rodriguez
8	Shamil Musaev	Marcirley Alves	Asaël Adjoudj	Natan Schulte	Eliezer Kubanza
9	Timur Khizriev	Daniel Marcos	Alexei Pergande	Amru Magomedov	Cedric Doumbe
10	Paul Hughes	Naoki Inoue	Khasan Magomedsharipov	Darragh Kelly	Eoin Sheridan

Rank	Middleweight	Light heavyweight	Heavyweight	Women's Flyweight
(C)	Costello van Steenis	Corey Anderson	Sergey Bilostenniy	Jena Bishop
1	Johnny Eblen	Antônio Carlos Júnior	Vadim Nemkov	Dakota Ditcheva
2	Fabian Edwards	Luke Trainer	Oleg Popov	Liz Carmouche
3	Impa Kasanganay	Simeon Powell	Denis Goltsov	Taila Santos
4	Bryan Battle	Dovletdzhan Yagshimuradov	Alexander Romanov	
5	Boris Mbarga Atangana	Rasul Magomedov	Abraham Bably	Paulina Wisniewska
6	Aaron Jeffery	Rob Wilkinson	Maxwell Djantou Nana	Sabrinna de Sousa
7	Dalton Rosta	Sullivan Cauley	Jose Augusto	Denise Kielholtz
8	Josh Fremd	Rafael Xavier	Hasan Mezhiev	Viviane Araújo
9	Joshua Silviera	Emiliano Sordi	Eduardo Neves	Tatiana Postarnakova
10	Jhony Gregory	Moustapha Diakhaté		Shannon Clark

== Current champions, weight classes and status ==
PFL currently uses eight different weight classes. This list of champions is updated as of September 10, 2026.

WC	Min	Upper limit	G	Champion	Flag	Date won	Days held	Defenses	Next Fight / Info
FLW	>115 Ib >52.2 kg	125 Ib; 56.7 kg	W	Jena Bishop	United States	Oct 16, 2026	30		
BW	>125 Ib >56.7 kg	135 Ib; 61.2 kg	M	Vacant					PFL Lyon - Taylor Lapilus vs Mitchell McKee
FW	>135 Ib >61.2 kg	145 Ib; 65.8 kg	M	Razhabali Shaydullaev	Kyrgyzstan	Sept 10, 2026	66		
FW	>135 Ib >61.2 kg	145 Ib; 65.8 kg	W	Cris Cyborg	Brazil	Dec 10, 2025	340	1. def. Ketlen Vieira at PFL Tampa on Aug 23, 2026	
LW	>145 Ib >65.8 kg	155 Ib; 70.3 kg	M	Usman Nurmagomedov	Russian Federation	Oct 3, 2025	408	1. def. Alfie Davis at PFL Dubai on Feb 7, 2026; 2. def. Archive Colgan at PFL New York on July 31, 2026	
WW	>155 Ib >70.3 kg	170 Ib; 77.1 kg	M	Thad Jean	United States	July 25, 2026	113		
MW	>170 Ib >77.1 kg	185 Ib; 83.9 kg	M	Costello van Steenis	Spain	July 19, 2025	484	1. def. Fabian Edwards at PFL Madrid on March 20, 2026	
MW	>170 Ib >77.1 kg	185 Ib; 83.9 kg	M	Johnny Eblen (interim)	United States	July 18, 2026	120		
LHW	>185 Ib >83.9 kg	205 Ib; 93 kg	M	Corey Anderson	United States	Oct 3, 2025	408		
HW	>205 Ib >93 kg	265 Ib; 120.2 kg	M	Sergey Bilostenniy	Russian Federation	Nov 14, 2026	1		

== PFL Main Roster ==
=== Heavyweights (265 lb, 120 kg) ===
ISO	Name	Age	Ht.	Nickname	Result / next fight / status	Months since Last Bout	PFL/Bellator record	MMA record
(England)	Linton Vassell	43	6 ft 4 in (1.93 m)	The Swarm	Win - PFL Madrid - Jose Augusto	7	14–7	26–10 (1)
(Russia)	Vadim Nemkov	34	6 ft 0 in (1.83 m)		Loss - PFL Dubai 2 - Sergey Bilostenniy	0	12–1 (1)	20–3 (1)
(Russia)	Denis Goltsov	36	6 ft 5 in (1.96 m)	The Russian Bogatyr	Win - PFL Chicago 2 - Maxwell Djantou Nana	0	16–4	38–9
(Brazil)	Jose Augusto	34	5 ft 9 in (1.75 m)	Gugu	Loss - PFL Champions Series 6 (Madrid) - Linton Vassell	7	2–3	11–6
(Russia)	Oleg Popov	34	6 ft 1 in (1.85 m)		Win - PFL Dubai 2 - Pouya Rahmani	0	8–1	23–2
(Russia)	Sergey Bilostenniy (C)	31	6 ft 1 in (1.85 m)		Win - PFL Dubai 2 - Vadim Nemkov	0	6–2	16–4
(Cameroon)	Maxwell Djantou Nana	35	6 ft 4 in (1.93 m)	Leonidas	Loss - PFL Chicago 2 - Denis Goltsov	0	4–2	9–3
(Moldova)	Alexander Romanov	35	6 ft 2 in (1.88 m)	King Kong	Win - PFL Chicago - Rodrigo Nascimento	7	2–1 (1)	22-4 (1)
(Iran)	Pouya Rahmani	34	6 ft 2 in (1.88 m)		Loss - PFL Dubai 2 - Oleg Popov	9	2–1	6–1
(Latvia)	Hasan Mezhiev	34	6 ft 2 in (1.88 m)		Loss - PFL Charlotte - Denis Goltsov	3	0–1	15–1
(Brazil)	Eduardo Neves	26	6 ft 2 in (1.88 m)	Bebezao	Loss - PFL Charlotte - Maxwell Djantou Nana	3	0–1	9–4

=== Light Heavyweights (205 lb, 93 kg) ===
ISO	Name	Age	Ht.	Nickname	Result / next fight / status	Months since Last Bout	PFL/Bellator record	MMA record
(Argentina)	Emiliano Sordi	35	6 ft 2 in (1.88 m)	He-Man	Win - PFL Chicago 2 - Abraham Bably	0	9–7–1	28–14–1
(United States)	Phil Davis	42	6 ft 2 in (1.88 m)	Mr. Wonderful		16	12–5	25–8 (1)
(Russia)	Valentin Moldavsky	34	6 ft 1 in (1.85 m)		Loss - PFL Charlotte - Bruno Cappelozza	3	9–3 (2)	15–5 (2)
(United States)	Corey Anderson (C)	37	6 ft 3 in (1.91 m)	Overtime		13	7–1 (1)	20–6 (1)
(Sweden)	Karl Albrektsson	33	6 ft 2 in (1.88 m)	King		16	2–5	14–8
(England)	Luke Trainer	30	6 ft 6 in (1.98 m)	The Gent	Win - PFL Tampa - Roland Dunlap	2	8–1	11–1
(Turkmenistan)	Dovletdzhan Yagshimuradov	37	5 ft 11 in (1.80 m)		Loss - PFL Charlotte - Simeón Powell	3	8–4	26–9–1
(United States)	Sullivan Cauley	30	6 ft 1 in (1.85 m)		Loss - PFL Washington DC - Rasul Magomedov	3	8–3	8–3
(Brazil)	Antônio Carlos Júnior	36	6 ft 2 in (1.88 m)			14	9–1 (1)	19–6 (1)
(Brazil)	Bruno Cappelozza	37	6 ft 2 in (1.88 m)		Win - PFL Charlotte - Valentin Moldavsky	3	6–2 (1)	17–7 (1)
(England)	Simeón Powell	27	6 ft 5 in (1.96 m)	Smooth	Win - PFL Charlotte - Dovletdzhan Yagshimuradov	3	8–2	13–2
(England)	Abraham Bably	30	5 ft 10 in (1.78 m)	The One and Only	Loss - PFL Chicago 2 - Emiliano Sordi	0	5–4	8–4
(Germany)	Rafael Xavier	35	6 ft 1 in (1.85 m)	Kratos	Win - PFL Washington DC - Tyson Pedro	3	2–2	15–9
(Bahrain)	Rasul Magomedov	31	6 ft 2 in (1.88 m)		Win - PFL Washington DC - Sullivan Cauley	3	3–0	10–0
(Russia)	Khabib Nabiev	N/A	6 ft 1 in (1.85 m)		Win - PFL Dubai 2 - Styve Ngono Essono	0	2–0	13–0
(Australia)	Tyson Pedro	35	6 ft 3 in (1.91 m)	Kangaroo Paws	Loss - PFL Washington DC - Rafael Xavier	3	0–2	10–7
(Cameroon)	Styve Ngono	N/A	6 ft 2 in (1.88 m)		Loss - PFL Dubai 2 - Khabib Nabiev	0	2–1	8–2
(Suriname)	Donegi Abena	28	6 ft 4 in (1.93 m)		Win - PFL Brussels (Brussels) - Joe Schilling	5	1–0	1–0
(Senegal)	Moustapha Diakhaté	N/A	6 ft 4 in (1.93 m)		Win - PFL New York - Darryl Walker	3	1–0	6–0–1
(United States)	Roland Dunlap	33	6 ft 3 in (1.91 m)	The Dream	Loss - PFL Tampa - Luke Trainer	2	0–1	7–1 (1)

=== Middleweights (185 lb, 84 kg) ===
ISO	Name	Age	Ht.	Nickname	Result / next fight / status	Months since Last Bout	PFL/Bellator record	MMA record
(France)	Grégory Babene	42	6 ft 0 in (1.83 m)	Blade		13	5–2	23–13
(England)	Mike Shipman	36	5 ft 10 in (1.78 m)	Sea Bass		18	8–4	17–5
(Spain)	Costello van Steenis (C)	34	6 ft 1 in (1.85 m)	The Spaniard		7	10–2	18–3
(Sweden)	Sadibou Sy	39	6 ft 3 in (1.91 m)	Swedish Denzel Washington		18	11–7–2 (1)	17–9–2 (1)
(England)	Fabian Edwards	33	6 ft 1 in (1.85 m)	The Assassin	PFL Lyon - Ilian Bouafia	7	12–5	16–5
(United States)	Johnny Eblen (IC)	34	6 ft 3 in (1.91 m)	Diamond Hands	Win - PFL Austin - Impa Kasanganay	3	14–1	18–1
(United States)	Dalton Rosta	31	6 ft 0 in (1.83 m)	Hercules	Loss - PFL Charlotte - Bryan Battle	3	11–4	11–4
(United States)	Josh Silveira	33	6 ft 1 in (1.85 m)	Coninha	Loss - PFL Charlotte - Aaron Jeffery	3	8–6	15–6
(United States)	Impa Kasanganay	32	5 ft 11 in (1.80 m)	Tshilobo	Loss - PFL Charlotte - Johnny Eblen	3	10–4	20–7
(Canada)	Aaron Jeffery	34	6 ft 2 in (1.88 m)		Win - PFL Charlotte - Josh Silveira	3	6–3	17–6
(United States)	Andrew Sanchez	38	6 ft 1 in (1.85 m)	El Dirte		14	1–2	14–9
(Egypt)	Eslam Abdul Baset	33	6 ft 0 in (1.83 m)	Iron Man		15	0–2	16–4
(England)	Haider Khan	N/A	6 ft 2 in (1.88 m)	Darth	Loss - PFL Champions Series 5 (Dubai) - Jhony Gregory	9	2–1	10–2
(Belgium)	Boris Mbarga Atangana	N/A	6 ft 1 in (1.85 m)	Alain	PFL Lyon - Bryan Battle	5	4–0	9–0
(Brazil)	Jhony Gregory	32	6 ft 0 in (1.83 m)		Loss - PFL Charlotte - Josh Fremd	3	1–2	11–5
(United States)	Josh Fremd	32	6 ft 4 in (1.93 m)		Win - PFL Charlotte - Jhony Gregory	3	3–0	13–6
(United States)	Bryan Battle	32	6 ft 1 in (1.85 m)	The Butcher	PFL Lyon - Boris Mbarga Atangana	3	1–1	13–3

=== Welterweights (170 lb, 77 kg) ===
ISO	Name	Age	Ht.	Nickname	Result / next fight / status	Months since Last Bout	PFL/Bellator record	MMA record
(Russia)	Magomed Umalatov	34	6 ft 1 in (1.85 m)	Prince		17	8–1	18–1
(Moldova)	Luca Poclit	37	6 ft 0 in (1.83 m)		Loss - PFL Brussels (Brussels) - Khamzat Abaev	5	3–2	10–3
(United States)	Thad Jean (C)	28	6 ft 2 in (1.88 m)	The Silverback	Win - PFL Washington DC - Ernesto Rodriguez	3	8–0	12–0
(United States)	Chris Mixan	27	6 ft 1 in (1.85 m)	Cossack	Loss - PFL Washington DC - Eliezer Kubanza	3	3–2	7–3
(France)	Cédric Doumbé	34	5 ft 8 in (1.73 m)	The Best		29	2–1	6–1
(Italy)	Daniele Miceli	39	5 ft 7 in (1.70 m)	The Cyborg		16	2–2	13–7
(France)	Abdoul Abdouraguimov	31	5 ft 10 in (1.78 m)	Lazy King	Win - PFL Champions Series 5 (Dubai) - Kennedy St. Louis	9	4–0	20–1
(Albania)	Florim Zendeli	28	6 ft 1 in (1.85 m)		Loss - PFL Sioux Falls (Sioux Falls) - Logan Storley	6	4–1	11–2–1
(Angola)	Chequina Noso Pedro	N/A	5 ft 10 in (1.78 m)		Loss - PFL Belfast (Belfast) - Omran Chaaban	6	1–2	10–5
(Russia)	Shamil Musaev	32	5 ft 10 in (1.78 m)	The Silent Assassin		9	4–1	20–1–1
(Egypt)	Omar El Dafrawy	31	5 ft 10 in (1.78 m)		Win - PFL New York - Jonathan Piersma	3	6–1	16–6
(Belgium)	Patrick Habirora	25	6 ft 1 in (1.85 m)	The Belgian Bomber	Win - PFL Brussels (Brussels) - Benson Henderson	5	5–0	9–0
(Republic of Ireland)	Eoin Sheridan	32	6 ft 5 in (1.96 m)		Win - PFL Tampa - James Vake	2	4–0	6–0
(Greece)	Giannis Bachar	36	6 ft 1 in (1.85 m)		Loss - PFL Belfast (Belfast) - David Martinez	6	0–2	9–4
(United States)	Kendly St. Louis	35	5 ft 11 in (1.80 m)	The Highlander	PFL Chicago 2 - Oualy Tandia	9	1–2	11–6
(England)	Danny Roberts	39	6 ft 1 in (1.85 m)	Hot Chocolate		16	0–1	18–9
(Belgium)	Khamzat Abaev	30	6 ft 0 in (1.83 m)	Borz	PFL Chicago 2 - Leon Hill	5	1–1	6–1
(France)	Kevin Jousset	33	6 ft 2 in (1.88 m)	Air		11	0–1	10–5
(Democratic Republic of the Congo)	Eliezer Kubanza	28	5 ft 9 in (1.75 m)	King Kong	Win - PFL Chicago 2 - Trey Waters	0	3–0	10–1
(Argentina)	Franco Tenaglia	30	5 ft 9 in (1.75 m)	El Rey de la Calle	Win - PFL Champions Series 6 (Madrid) - Yassin Najid	7	1–0	6–2
(Cuba)	Ernesto Rodriguez	29	5 ft 9 in (1.75 m)	Starboy	Win - PFL Dubai 2 - Rhys McKee	0	2–1	12–2
(Tonga)	James Vake	32	5 ft 11 in (1.80 m)	King	Loss - PFL Tampa - Eoin Sheridan	2	0–2	7–3
(Australia)	David Martinez	33	5 ft 9 in (1.75 m)	The Smiling Assassin	PFL Dubai 2 - Abubakar Nurmagomedov	6	1–0	17–6
(Finland)	Omran Chaaban	N/A	6 ft 1 in (1.85 m)	The Lebanese Gorilla	Win - PFL Belfast (Belfast) - Chequina Noso Pedro	6	1–0	10–1
(Republic of Ireland)	Rhys McKee	31	6 ft 2 in (1.88 m)	Skeletor	Loss - PFL Dubai 2 - Ernesto Rodriguez	0	1–1	15–8–1
(France)	Alex Lohoré	36	5 ft 9 in (1.75 m)	Da Killa King	Loss - PFL Belfast (Belfast) - Alex Lohore	6	2–1	26–12
(United States)	Jonathan Piersma	30	5 ft 11 in (1.80 m)	War Hawk	Loss - PFL New York - Omar El Dafrawy	3	0–1	12–4
(United States)	Trey Waters	31	6 ft 5 in (1.96 m)	The Truth	Loss - PFL Chicago 2 - Eliezer Kubanza	0	1–1	10–3
(United States)	Trukon Carson	31	5 ft 11 in (1.80 m)	The Carolina Gamedog	Loss - PFL Charlotte - Trey Waters	3	0–1	6–2
(United States)	Aaron McKenzie	38	5 ft 11 in (1.80 m)		Loss - Rkena vs. PFL (Tbilisi) - Nikoloz Abramishvili	0	1–1	12–3–1
(France)	Oualay Tandia	24	6 ft 3 in (1.91 m)		Win - PFL Chicago 2 - J.P Saint Louis	0	1–0	6–0
(Russia)	Saygid Izagakhmaev	32	6 ft 0 in (1.83 m)		Win - PFL Dubai 2 - David Martinez	0	1–0	23–4

=== Lightweights (155 lb, 70 kg) ===
ISO	Name	Age	Ht.	Nickname	Loss -	Months Since Last Bouts	PFL/Bellator record	MMA record
(Portugal)	Pedro Carvalho	31	5 ft 11 in (1.80 m)	The Game	Loss - Rkena vs. PFL (Tbilisi) - Levan Kirtadze	0	7–7	15–11
(Brazil)	Natan Schulte	34	5 ft 10 in (1.78 m)	Russo	Win - PFL Tampa - Makkasharip Zaynukov	2	15–3–1	26–6–1
(New Zealand)	Jay Jay Wilson	29	5 ft 10 in (1.78 m)	The Maori Kid		6	11–2	12–2
(England)	Alfie Davis	34	5 ft 11 in (1.80 m)	The Axe Man	Loss - PFL San Diego - Alexandr Shabliy	4	11–4–1	20–7–1
(United States)	Mike Hamel	34	5 ft 9 in (1.75 m)	Magic		16	4–4	11–7
(Russia)	Usman Nurmagomedov (C)	28	5 ft 11 in (1.80 m)		Win - PFL New York (New York ) - Archie Colgan	3	11–0 (1 NC)	22–0 (1 NC)
(United States)	Clay Collard	33	6 ft 0 in (1.83 m)	Cassius		18	7–7	25–15 (1)
(Russia)	Alexandr Shabliy	33	5 ft 9 in (1.75 m)	Peresvet	PFL Chicago 2 - Landry Ward	4	6–1	25–4
(Russia)	Gadzhi Rabadanov	33	5 ft 9 in (1.75 m)		Win - PFL Tampa - Tracy Reeder	2	13–1	28–5–2
(United States)	Archie Colgan	31	5 ft 8 in (1.73 m)	King	Loss - PFL New York (New York ) - Usman Nurmagomedov	3	10–1	13–1
(Republic of Ireland)	Darragh Kelly	28	6 ft 0 in (1.83 m)	The Moville Mauler	Loss - PFL Belfast (Belfast) - Jay Jay Wilson	6	7–1	9–1
(Brazil)	Bruno Miranda	36	5 ft 9 in (1.75 m)	Robusto		18	3–3	17–6
(United States)	Alexei Pergande	25	6 ft 0 in (1.83 m)	Russian DNA	PFL Dubai 2 - Akhmed Magomedov	0	8–0	8–0
(Russia)	Akhmed Magomedov	30	5 ft 8 in (1.73 m)		PFL Dubai 2 - Alexei Pergande	0	2–2	11–2
(Latvia)	Aleksandr Chizov	28	5 ft 11 in (1.80 m)	Pretty Boy	Loss - PFL Sioux Falls (Sioux Falls) - Gadzhi Rabadanov	6	4–3	13–4
(Tunisia)	Mansour Barnaoui	34	6 ft 0 in (1.83 m)	The Afro-Samurai		16	3–3	22–7
(England)	Connor Hughes	29	5 ft 11 in (1.80 m)		PFL Dubai - Shaqueme Rock	11	5–3	12–3
(Poland)	Jakub Kaszuba	31	5 ft 11 in (1.80 m)	The Auditor		7	8–0	16–0
(Scotland)	Mark Ewen	N/A	5 ft 9 in (1.75 m)		Loss - PFL Pittsburgh (Pittsburgh) - Gino van Steenis	7	3–3	7–3
(Mexico)	Sergio Cossio	29	5 ft 9 in (1.75 m)	Drako	Loss - PFL Belfast (Belfast) - Pedro Carvalho	6	2–3	27–12–1
(United States)	Biaggio Ali Walsh	28	5 ft 10 in (1.78 m)		Loss - PFL Austin - Gamid Khizriev	3	4–2	4–2
(Italy)	Claudio Pacella	N/A	5 ft 9 in (1.75 m)		Win - PFL Champions Series 6 (Madrid) - David Mora	7	4–2	7–3
(Republic of Ireland)	Paul Hughes	29	5 ft 9 in (1.75 m)	Big News	(Apr 2) Knee Injury - Out of PFL Belfast (Belfast) - Jay-Jay Wilson	13	3–2	14–3
(United States)	Kevin Pease	29	5 ft 8 in (1.73 m)	Sweet Pea	Win - PFL Chicago 2 - Cássio Barão	0	2–0	9–0 (1)
(Russia)	Makkasharip Zaynukov	35	5 ft 10 in (1.78 m)		Loss - PFL Tampa - Natan Schulte	2	4–1	19–5
(Uzbekistan)	Mirafzal Akhtamov	33	5 ft 10 in (1.78 m)	Mirko		13	2–0	9–1–1
(Spain)	Gino van Steenis	28	6 ft 1 in (1.85 m)	Ghost Assassin	Win - PFL Tampa - Robert Watley	2	3–1	9–2
(United States)	Kevin Lee	34	5 ft 9 in (1.75 m)	Motown Phenom		16	0–1	20–9
(United States)	Robert Watley	37	5 ft 9 in (1.75 m)	Contact	Loss - PFL Tampa - Gino van Steenis	2	1–2	16–5
(France)	Amin Ayoub	31	5 ft 11 in (1.80 m)	Fierceness		9	1–1	26–6
(Russia)	Amru Magomedov	27	5 ft 11 in (1.80 m)		Win - PFL New York - Angel Alvarez	9	2–0	11–0
(United States)	Kolton Englund	33	5 ft 10 in (1.78 m)	White Assassin	Loss - PFL Champions Series 5 (Dubai) - Amru Magomedov	9	0–1	15–5
(United States)	Dakota Bush	32	5 ft 10 in (1.78 m)	Hairy	Win - PFL Tampa - Morquez Forest	2	2–0	17–4
(Cuba)	Angel Alvarez	31	5 ft 7 in (1.70 m)	Salsa King	Loss - PFL New York - Amru Magomedov	6	1–1	11–3
(United States)	Michael Boylan	25	6 ft 0 in (1.83 m)	Hairy	Loss - PFL Chicago 2 - Gamid Khizriev	0	0–2	6–2
(Russia)	Gamid Khizriev	N/A	5 ft 11 in (1.80 m)		Win - PFL Chicago 2 - Michael Boylan	0	2–0	8–0
(Georgia (country))	Levan Khabalaev	27	6 ft 2 in (1.88 m)		Win - PFL Chicago 2 - Brock Hamer	0	2–0	7–0
(United States)	Landry Ward	29	6 ft 0 in (1.83 m)	Lone Star		3	1–0	11–3
(United States)	Tracy Reeder	27	5 ft 11 in (1.80 m)		Loss - Rkena vs. PFL (Tbilisi) - Ruslan Bolkvadze	0	0–1	12–7
(Brazil)	Cássio Junior	31	5 ft 8 in (1.73 m)	Barão	Loss - PFL Chicago 2 - Kevin Pease	0	0–1	10–2–1
(England)	Shaqueme Rock	833	5 ft 11 in (1.80 m)		PFL Dubai 2 - Connor Hughes	0	0–0	12–3–1

=== Featherweights (145 lb, 66 kg) ===
ISO	Name	Age	Ht.	Nickname	Result / next fight / status	Months Since Last Bouts	PFL/Bellator record	MMA record
(United States)	A. J. McKee	31	5 ft 10 in (1.78 m)	The Mercenary	Loss - Super Rizin 5 - Razhabali Shaydullaev	2	25–3	25–3
(Hungary)	Ádám Borics	33	5 ft 11 in (1.80 m)	The Kid	Win - PFL Dubai 2 - Khasan Magomedsharipov	0	12–4	21–4
(United States)	Ethan Goss	34	5 ft 10 in (1.78 m)		Loss - PFL Pittsburgh (Pittsburgh) - Frederik Dupras	7	0–3	12–9
(Russia)	Movlid Khaybulaev	36	5 ft 6 in (1.68 m)	Killer	PFL Dubai 2 - Asaël Adjoudj	15	10–0–1 (1)	24–0–1 (1)
(England)	Brendan Loughnane	36	5 ft 9 in (1.75 m)			23	12–3	30–6
(France)	Asaël Adjoudj	27	6 ft 0 in (1.83 m)		PFL Dubai 2 - Movlid Khaybulaev	5	9–1	11–1
(Russia)	Khasan Magomedsharipov	26	5 ft 11 in (1.80 m)		Loss - PFL Dubai 2 - Ádám Borics	0	6–1	11–1
(Republic of Ireland)	Nathan Kelly	29	5 ft 8 in (1.73 m)			15	7–3	11–5
(Russia)	Timur Khizriev	30	5 ft 9 in (1.75 m)	Imam	Win - PFL Chicago 2 - Gabriel Braga	0	8–0	19–0
(Brazil)	Gabriel Alves Braga	28	5 ft 10 in (1.78 m)		Loss - PFL Chicago 2 - Timur Khizriev	0	9–4	17–4
(Peru)	Jesus Pinedo	30	5 ft 11 in (1.80 m)	El Mudo	Win - PFL Austin - Joey Ruquet	3	6–3	26–8–1
(France)	Adam Meskini	30	5 ft 8 in (1.73 m)		Win - PFL Brussels (Brussels) - Keweny Lopes	5	3–1	11–3
(England)	Ibragim Ibragimov	22	5 ft 8 in (1.73 m)	The Mauler	Win - Rkena vs. PFL (Tbilisi) - Nika Kupravishvili	0	5–0	11–0
(Spain)	Ignacio Campos	N/A	5 ft 10 in (1.78 m)	Nacho	Win - PFL Africa 2 (Lagos) - Wasi Adeshina	5	2–1	8–2
(Canada)	Frederik Dupras	33	5 ft 9 in (1.75 m)		Win - PFL Pittsburgh (Pittsburgh) - Ethan Goss	7	2–1	10–2
(Belgium)	Gaetano Pirrello	34	5 ft 7 in (1.70 m)	El Tigre		16	1–0	17–7–1
(Brazil)	Keweny Lopes	31	5 ft 9 in (1.75 m)	Leão	Loss - PFL Brussels (Brussels) - Adam Meskini	5	0–2	12–5–1
(Republic of Ireland)	Caolán Loughran	30	5 ft 6 in (1.68 m)	The Don	Loss - PFL Austin - Julio Arce	3	1–2	11–4
(Kazakhstan)	Salamat Isbulaev	29	5 ft 7 in (1.70 m)		Loss - PFL San Diego - A. J. McKee	4	1–1	10–1
(United States)	Julio Arce	37	5 ft 7 in (1.70 m)		Win - PFL Austin - Caolán Loughran	3	1–1	22–7
(United States)	Cheyden Leialoha	32	5 ft 8 in (1.73 m)	Steadfast	Win - PFL Charlotte - Robbie Ring	3	1–1	12–3
(South Korea)	Sang Won Kim	33	5 ft 9 in (1.75 m)	No Problem	Win - PFL Sioux Falls (Sioux Falls) - Humberto Bandenay	6	1–0	15–6–1
(Peru)	Humberto Bandenay	32	5 ft 11 in (1.80 m)	The Peruvian Problem	Loss - PFL Sioux Falls (Sioux Falls) - Sang Won Kim	6	0–1	27–10
(Japan)	Keisuke Sasu	32	5 ft 7 in (1.70 m)	Sasuke	Loss - PFL Brussels (Brussels) - Asaël Adjoudj	5	0–1	14–4–1
(United States)	Noah Hermosillo	27	5 ft 7 in (1.70 m)		Win - PFL Chicago 2 - Caden Cox	0	2–0	2–0
(United States)	Robbie Ring	26	5 ft 9 in (1.75 m)	Razor	Loss - PFL Charlotte - Cheyden Leialoha	3	0–1	9–2
(Kyrgyzstan)	Razhabali Shaydullaev (C)	26	5 ft 7 in (1.70 m)		Win - Super Rizin 5 - A. J. McKee	2	1–0	20–0
(United States)	Asa Ten Pow	37	5 ft 9 in (1.75 m)	The American Ninja	Loss - Rkena vs. PFL (Tbilisi) - David Mgoyan	0	0–0	2–1

=== Bantamweights (135 lb, 61 kg) ===
ISO	Name	Age	Ht.	Nickname	Result / next fight / status	Months since Last Bout	PFL/Bellator record	MMA record
(Brazil)	Leandro Higo	37	5 ft 8 in (1.73 m)	Pitbull	Loss - PFL Sioux Falls - Magomed Magomedov	6	6–6	23–8
(Republic of Ireland)	Ciarán Clarke	31	5 ft 8 in (1.73 m)		Loss - PFL Belfast - Dean Garnett	6	10–1	10–1
(United States)	Raufeon Stots	37	5 ft 7 in (1.70 m)	Supa	Loss - PFL New York - Lazaro Dayron	3	9–4	21–5
(United States)	Sergio Pettis	33	5 ft 6 in (1.68 m)	The Phenom		7	7–2	25–8
(Russia)	Magomed Magomedov	34	5 ft 7 in (1.70 m)	Tiger	Loss - PFL Tampa - Daniel Marcos	2	6–5	22–6
(Brazil)	Matheus Mattos	34	5 ft 5 in (1.65 m)	Adamas		19	2–3	14–4–1
(Tajikistan)	Sarvarjon Khamidov	29	5 ft 6 in (1.68 m)	Sarvar	Win - PFL Chicago 2 - Rafael do Nascimento	0	5–1	18–1
(England)	Lewis McGrillen-Evans	26	5 ft 6 in (1.68 m)	The McGrizzla	Win - PFL Charlotte - Brandon Lewis	3	7–2	13–2
(United States)	Bryce Meredith	31	5 ft 9 in (1.75 m)	Misfit	Win - PFL Washington DC - Michael Cyr	3	5–1	8–1
(Brazil)	Marcirley Alves	27	5 ft 4 in (1.63 m)	Durin	Loss - PFL Tampa - Nkosi Ndebele	2	4–3	15–6
(Russia)	Kasum Kasumov	32	5 ft 8 in (1.73 m)		Loss - PFL Champions Series 5 (Dubai) - Taylor Lapilus	9	2–1	16–2
(Cuba)	Lazaro Dayron	34	5 ft 5 in (1.65 m)	The Hunter	Win - PFL New York - Raufeon Stots	3	3–0–1	11–0–1
(England)	Dean Garnett	38	5 ft 6 in (1.68 m)		Win - PFL Belfast - Ciarán Clarke	6	3–2	15–4–1
(France)	Mahio Campanella	N/A	5 ft 9 in (1.75 m)			16	2–0	8–1
(Russia)	Renat Khavalov	28	5 ft 7 in (1.70 m)		Win - PFL Chicago - Raufeon Stots	7	3–0	12–0
(United States)	Justin Wetzell	34	5 ft 9 in (1.75 m)		Loss - PFL San Diego - Sarvarjon Khamidov	4	2–2	12–4
(Northern Ireland)	Alan Philpott	34	5 ft 8 in (1.73 m)	Super Ali	Loss - PFL Belfast - Caolán Loughran	6	0–2	21–18
(France)	Taylor Lapilus	34	5 ft 6 in (1.68 m)	Double Impact	PFL Lyon - Mitchell McKee	5	3–0	25–4
(Portugal)	Gustavo Oliveira	30	5 ft 8 in (1.73 m)	Heart	Win - PFL Brussels - Baris Adiguzel	5	3–0	13–2
(Belgium)	Movsar Ibragimov	28	5 ft 8 in (1.73 m)		Loss - PFL Tampa - Javid Basharat	2	2–2	8–2
(South Africa)	Nkosi Ndebele	31	5 ft 10 in (1.78 m)	King	Win - PFL Tampa - Marcirley Alves	2	6–0	14–3
(France)	Baris Adiguzel	N/A	5 ft 5 in (1.65 m)	The Problem	Loss - PFL Brussels - Gustavo Oliveira	5	2–1	10–2
(England)	Jack Cartwright	32	5 ft 9 in (1.75 m)			7	2–0	14–2
(England)	Liam Gittins	N/A	5 ft 6 in (1.68 m)	Nightmare	Loss - PFL Belfast - David Martinez	6	0–2	13–6 (1)
(Uruguay)	Luciano Pereira	25	5 ft 3 in (1.60 m)	El Toro	Win - PFL Champions Series 6 (Madrid) - Kevin Cordero	7	1–0	16–1
(Spain)	Kevin Cordero	27	5 ft 6 in (1.68 m)		Loss - PFL Champions Series 6 (Madrid) - Luciano Pereira	7	0–1	15–6
(Brazil)	Allan Begosso	30	5 ft 5 in (1.65 m)	Mini	Loss - PFL New York - Sean Gauci	3	0–2	10–5–1
(United States)	Jacob Thrall	31	5 ft 6 in (1.68 m)	Gerberbaby	Loss - PFL Pittsburgh - Lazaro Dayron	7	0–1	15–8–1
(Italy)	Michele Clemente	26	5 ft 6 in (1.68 m)	The Arrow	Loss - PFL Africa 1 (Pretoria) - Nkosi Ndebele	7	0–1	7–2
(United States)	Mitchell McKee	28	5 ft 6 in (1.68 m)	Merciless	PFL Lyon - Taylor Lapilus	7	2–0	11–0
(Australia)	Sean Gauci	29	5 ft 5 in (1.65 m)		Win - PFL New York - Allan Begosso	3	2–0	12–1
(United States)	Cobey Fehr	32	5 ft 6 in (1.68 m)	The Don	Win - PFL Chicago 2 - Rosario Romero	0	2–0	5–0
(Brazil)	Rafael do Nascimento	35	5 ft 6 in (1.68 m)	Mulisha	Loss - PFL Chicago 2 - Sarvarjon Khamidov	0	1–1	13–3
(Afghanistan)	Javid Basharat	31	5 ft 9 in (1.75 m)	The Snow Leopard	Win - PFL Tampa - Movsar Ibragimov	2	1–0	16–2
(Peru)	Daniel Marcos	33	5 ft 7 in (1.70 m)	Soncora	Win - PFL Tampa - Magomed Magomedov	2	1–0	19–1
(Sierra Leone)	Abdul Kamara	35	5 ft 10 in (1.78 m)	The Reborn King	Loss - Rkena vs. PFL (Tbilisi) - Bakhtiyar Nesipbek	0	0–0	11–3

=== Women's Featherweights (145 lb, 66 kg) ===
ISO	Name	Age	Ht.	Nickname	Result / next fight / status	Months since Last Bout	PFL/Bellator record	MMA record
(Brazil)	Cris Cyborg (C)	41	5 ft 8 in (1.73 m)		Win - PFL Tampa - Ketlen Vieira	2	9–0	30–2
(Australia)	Sara Collins	36	5 ft 7 in (1.70 m)			11	3–1	6–1
(Brazil)	Ketlen Vieira	35	5 ft 9 in (1.75 m)	Fenômeno	Loss - PFL Tampa - Cris Cyborg	2	0–1	16–6

=== Women's Flyweights (125 lb, 57 kg) ===
ISO	Name	Age	Ht.	Nickname	Result / next fight / status	Months since Last Bout	PFL/Bellator record	MMA record
(Netherlands)	Denise Kielholtz	37	5 ft 3 in (1.60 m)	Miss Dynamite	Loss - PFL New York - Dakota Ditcheva	3	9–5	9–6
(Brazil)	Juliana Velasquez	40	5 ft 6 in (1.68 m)			15	9–4	14–4
(Brazil)	Ilara Joanne	32	5 ft 3 in (1.60 m)	Arya Stark	Loss - PFL San Diego - Shannon Clark	4	5–7	13–11
(Japan)	Kana Watanabe*	38	5 ft 6 in (1.68 m)		Loss - PFL Chicago (Chicago) - Paulina Wiśniewska	7	5–5	13–5–1
(United States)	Liz Carmouche	42	5 ft 6 in (1.68 m)	Girl-Rilla	Loss - PFL Chicago 2 - Jena Bishop	0	13–2	26–9
(United States)	Sumiko Inaba	35	5 ft 4 in (1.63 m)	Lady Samurai	Loss - PFL Pittsburgh (Pittsburgh) - Sumiko Inaba	7	8–3	8–3
(Russia)	Diana Avsaragova	28	5 ft 7 in (1.70 m)	Pantera		19	4–2	6–2
(England)	Dakota Ditcheva	28	5 ft 8 in (1.73 m)	Dangerous	Win - PFL New York - Denise Kielholtz	3	11–0	16–0
(United States)	Shanna Young	35	5 ft 7 in (1.70 m)	The Shanimal		6	1–3	11–9
(United States)	Jena Bishop (C)	40	5 ft 4 in (1.63 m)		Win - PFL Chicago 2 - Liz Carmouche	0	8–3	12–3
(Ukraine)	Ekaterina Shakalova	29	5 ft 2 in (1.57 m)			15	2–3	9–4
(Brazil)	Taila Santos	33	5 ft 6 in (1.68 m)		Loss - PFL Tampa - Ketlen Vieira	2	4–2	23–5
(Mexico)	Saray Orozco	35	5 ft 5 in (1.65 m)	Killer Queen		15	0–3	8–8
(Bahrain)	Sabrinna de Sousa	26	5 ft 3 in (1.60 m)		Win - PFL Tampa - Sabrinna de Sousa	2	4–0	7–0
(Poland)	Paulina Wiśniewska	27	5 ft 6 in (1.68 m)		Win PFL Chicago 2 - Chelsea Hackett	7	5–1	7–1
(Scotland)	Gemma Auld	36	5 ft 5 in (1.65 m)			18	2–0	2–0
(Brazil)	Elora Dana	28	5 ft 3 in (1.60 m)	Onca Negra	Loss - PFL Charlotte - Cheyanne Bowers	3	1–3	8–3
(England)	Sammy-Jo Luxton	27	5 ft 7 in (1.70 m)	The Ghetto Cinderella		18	0–1	2–1
(Russia)	Tatiana Postarnakova	26	5 ft 6 in (1.68 m)		Win - PFL New York (New York) - Montana De La Rosa	3	3–0	9–0
(Brazil)	Viviane Araújo	39	5 ft 5 in (1.65 m)	Vivi	Loss - PFL San Diego - Liz Carmouche	4	1–1	14–8
(Georgia (country))	Borena Tsertsvadze	N/A	5 ft 4 in (1.63 m)		Loss - PFL Austin - Victoria Alba	3	0–2	6–2
(Mexico)	Andrea Vázquez	32	5 ft 3 in (1.60 m)	Monstruo	Loss - PFL Austin - Aleksandra Savicheva	3	0–2	8–4
(China)	Qihui Yan	30	5 ft 3 in (1.60 m)	Queen Kong	Loss - PFL Sioux Falls (Sioux Falls) - Taila Santos	6	0–1	25–6
(United States)	Cheyanne Bowers	32	5 ft 5 in (1.65 m)	The Boss	Win - PFL Charlotte - Elora Dana	3	1–1	8–3
(Canada)	Shannon Clark	34	5 ft 5 in (1.65 m)	MMA Barbie	Win - PFL Chicago 2 - Lucero Acosta	0	2–0	9–1
(Mexico)	Victoria Alba	34	5 ft 7 in (1.70 m)		Win - PFL Austin - Borena Tsertsvadze	3	1–0	7–2
(United States)	Mia Grawe	25	5 ft 3 in (1.60 m)	Raw	Loss -PFL Austin - Ashley Thiner	3	0–1	3–1
(United States)	Montana De La Rosa	31	5 ft 5 in (1.65 m)		Loss - PFL New York - Tatiana Postarnakova	3	0–1	13–10–1
(Mexico)	Lucero Acosta	32	5 ft 6 in (1.68 m)	La Loba	Loss - PFL Chicago 2 - Shanna Young	0	0–1	6–3

=== Women's Strawweights (115 lb, 52.2 kg) ===
ISO	Name	Age	Ht.	Nickname	Result / next fight / status	Months since Last Bout	PFL/Bellator record	MMA record
(Australia)	Jacinta Austin	32	5 ft 5 in (1.65 m)	The Juggernaut	Loss - PFL Dubai 2 - Aleksandra Savicheva	0	1–1	9–3
(Netherlands)	Benita van Rooij	N/A	5 ft 6 in (1.68 m)		Loss - PFL Champions Series 6 (Madrid) - Jacinta Austin	7	0–1	7–2
(Brazil)	Elisandra Ferreira	28	5 ft 1 in (1.55 m)	Lili	Win - PFL Africa 2 (Lagos) - Juliet Ukah	5	1–0	10–2
(Russia)	Aleksandra Savicheva	28	5 ft 5 in (1.65 m)		Win - PFL Dubai 2 - Jacinta Austin	0	2–0	9–2

== PFL Africa ==
=== Heavyweights (265 lb, 120 kg) ===
ISO	Name	Age	Ht.	Nickname	Status	PFL/Bellator record	MMA record
(Senegal)	Abdoullah Kane	28	6 ft 5 in (1.96 m)		Win - PFL Africa 3 (Casablanca) - Badr Medkouri	3–2	6–2
(South Africa)	Justin Clarke	N/A	6 ft 3 in (1.91 m)		Win - PFL Africa 1 (Pretoria) - Abdoullah Kane	3–1	5–1

=== Light Heavyweights (205 lb, 93 kg) ===
ISO	Name	Age	Ht.	Nickname	Status	PFL/Bellator record	MMA record
(Nigeria)	Richard Muzaan	25	6 ft 3 in (1.91 m)	Shield	Loss - PFL Africa 2 (Lagos) - Styve Ngono	0–1	6–4–1

=== Middleweights (185 lb, 84 kg) ===
ISO	Name	Age	Ht.	Nickname	Status	PFL/Bellator record	MMA record
(Cameroon)	Jordan Fongno	N/A	6 ft 2 in (1.88 m)		Win - PFL Africa 2 (Lagos) - Yahaya Yahuza	1–0	5–1
(Nigeria)	Yahaya Yahuza	25	5 ft 8 in (1.73 m)	Smile Strong	Loss - PFL Africa 2 (Lagos) - Jordan Fongno	0–1	8–1

=== Welterweights (170 lb, 77 kg) ===
ISO	Name	Age	Ht.	Nickname	Status	PFL/Bellator record	MMA record
(Angola)	Shido Boris Esperanca	30	5 ft 8 in (1.73 m)	Machine	Win - PFL Africa 3 (Casablanca) - Peace Nguphane	5–1	13–2
(Guinea-Bissau)	Yabna N’Tchalá	29	6 ft 0 in (1.83 m)	The Panther	Loss - PFL Africa 3 (Casablanca) - Mouhamed Ba	3–2	14–4–1
(Cameroon)	Emilios Dassi	N/A	5 ft 11 in (1.80 m)		Loss - PFL Africa 1 (Pretoria) - Shido Boris Esperanca	1–2	5–3
(Nigeria)	David Samuel	N/A	6 ft 0 in (1.83 m)		Win - PFL Africa 3 (Casablanca) - Rivaldo Pereira	2–0	7–0
(Nigeria)	Kunle Lawal	N/A	6 ft 1 in (1.85 m)		Loss - PFL Africa 1 (Pretoria) - Rivaldo Pereira	1–1	3–2
(Guinea-Bissau)	Rivaldo Pereira	29	6 ft 2 in (1.88 m)	Don Pepas	Loss - PFL Africa 3 (Casablanca) - David Samuel	1–1	4–3
(South Africa)	Peace Nguphane	N/A	5 ft 11 in (1.80 m)	X	Loss - PFL Africa 3 (Casablanca) -	1–1	9–4
(Senegal)	Mouhamed Ba	N/A	6 ft 0 in (1.83 m)		Win - PFL Africa 3 (Casablanca) - Yabna N’Tchalá	1–0 (1 NC)	4–1 (1 NC)
(Egypt)	Abdelrahman Mohamed	26	5 ft 9 in (1.75 m)	The African Prowler	Loss - PFL Africa 1 (Pretoria) - David Samuel	0–1	5–1

=== Lightweights (155 lb, 71 kg) ===
ISO	Name	Age	Ht.	Nickname	Status	PFL/Bellator record	MMA record
(Nigeria)	Patrick Ocheme	N/A	6 ft 0 in (1.83 m)	Star Boi	Win - PFL Africa 3 (Casablanca) - Cornel Thompson	4–0	10–1
(Nigeria)	Cornel Thompson	31	5 ft 8 in (1.73 m)	The Marine Boxer	Loss - PFL Africa 3 (Casablanca) - Patrick Ocheme	2–1	12–4
(Morocco)	Abderrahman Errachidy	25	5 ft 10 in (1.78 m)	Mugiwara	Win - PFL Africa 3 (Casablanca) -	1–1	5–2
(Benin)	Jean Do Santos	N/A	5 ft 8 in (1.73 m)	The Black Panther	Loss - PFL Africa 2 (Lagos) - Demba Seck	0–2	9–2
(Angola)	Áureo Cruz	29	5 ft 10 in (1.78 m)	Xerife	Loss - PFL Africa 2 (Lagos) - Cornel Thompson	0–1 (1 NC)	3–1 (1 NC)
(Senegal)	Demba Seck	32	6 ft 1 in (1.85 m)	Black Tiger	NC - PFL Africa 3 (Casablanca) - Hussain Al Kurdi	1–0 (1 NC)	11–3 (1 NC)
(Chad)	Hussain Al Kurdi	N/A	5 ft 11 in (1.80 m)	Black Panther	NC - PFL Africa 3 (Casablanca) - Demba Seck	1–0 (1 NC)	3–0 (1 NC)
(Democratic Republic of the Congo)	Tshilomba Mikixi	N/A	6 ft 1 in (1.85 m)	The Old Monkey	(June 8) Out of PFL Africa 2 (Lagos) - Cornel Thompson	0–0	5–0

=== Featherweights (145 lb, 66 kg) ===
ISO	Name	Age	Ht.	Nickname	Status	PFL/Bellator record	MMA record
(Nigeria)	Wasi Adeshina	29	5 ft 8 in (1.73 m)	The Nigerian Jaguar	Loss - PFL Africa 2 (Lagos) - Nacho Campos	3–1	10–4
(Democratic Republic of the Congo)	Jean-Jacques Lubaya	29	5 ft 9 in (1.75 m)	Ziwi	Loss - PFL Africa 1 (Pretoria) - Shadrick Dju Yemba	0–2	9–3

=== Bantamweights (135 lb, 61 kg) ===
ISO	Name	Age	Ht.	Nickname	Status	PFL/Bellator record	MMA record
(South Africa)	Frans Mlambo	35	5 ft 9 in (1.75 m)	The Black Mamba		5–3	15–7
(Angola)	Boule Godogo	N/A	5 ft 9 in (1.75 m)		Loss - PFL Africa 3 (Casablanca) - Dwight Joseph	2–3	5–3
(Nigeria)	Raphael Uchegbu	31	5 ft 10 in (1.78 m)	Scouse Spider	Win - PFL Africa 2 (Lagos) - Edson Machavane	3–1	11–2
(Liberia)	Dwight Joseph	37	5 ft 7 in (1.70 m)		Win - PFL Africa 3 (Casablanca) - Boule Godogo	3–1	17–3 (1 NC)
(Canada)	Karim Henniene	31	5 ft 10 in (1.78 m)	The Kryptonian	Win - PFL Africa 2 (Lagos) - Thimna Mhlauli	3–0	7–0
(Cameroon)	Alain Majorique	36	5 ft 8 in (1.73 m)	African Assassin	Loss - PFL Africa 2 (Lagos) - Dwight Joseph	1–2	6–2
(Zimbabwe)	Simbarashe Hokonya	28	5 ft 10 in (1.78 m)	The Hawk		1–1	6–1
(South Africa)	Asiashu Tshitamba	34	6 ft 0 in (1.83 m)		Win - PFL Africa 1 (Pretoria) - Shannon van Tonder	1–1	7–5
(South Africa)	Shannon van Tonder	31	5 ft 11 in (1.80 m)		Loss - PFL Africa 1 (Pretoria) - Asiashu Tshitamba	0–2	7–4
(Tanzania)	Dauda Rajabu	33	5 ft 11 in (1.80 m)	Go Getter	Loss - PFL Africa 2 (Lagos) - Boule Godogo	0–1	4–2
(Mozambique)	Edson Machavane	31	5 ft 9 in (1.75 m)	Trapdoor Spider	Loss - PFL Africa 2 (Lagos) - Raphael Uchegbu	0–1	7–2
(South Africa)	Thimna Mhlauli	N/A	5 ft 8 in (1.73 m)	Kingslayer	Loss - PFL Africa 2 (Lagos) - Karim Henniene	0–1	5–1

=== Women's Strawweights (115 lb, 52 kg) ===
ISO	Name	Age	Ht.	Nickname	Result / next fight / status	PFL/Bellator record	MMA record
(Nigeria)	Juliet Ukah	27	5 ft 6 in (1.68 m)	Golden Bones	Loss - PFL Africa 2 (Lagos) - Elisandra Ferreira	3–1	9–1
(Zambia)	Shelda Chipito	27	5 ft 3 in (1.60 m)	Miracle	Win - PFL Africa 2 (Lagos) - Haidy Ahmed	2–0	2–0
(Nigeria)	Jane Osigwe	21	5 ft 7 in (1.70 m)	The Slayer	Win - PFL Africa 3 (Casablanca) - Sanaa Mandar	1–1	6–4
(Kenya)	Felista Mugo	26	5 ft 5 in (1.65 m)	The Young Queen	Win - PFL Africa 1 (Pretoria) - Felista Mugo	1–0	6–2–1
(Uganda)	Annet Kiiza	25	5 ft 3 in (1.60 m)	Rose	Loss - PFL Africa 1 (Pretoria) - Felista Mugo	0–1	3–2
(Egypt)	Haidy Ahmed	N/A	5 ft 3 in (1.60 m)		Loss - PFL Africa 2 (Lagos) - Shelda Chipito	0–1	3–2

== PFL MENA ==
=== Middleweights (205 lb, 93 kg) ===
ISO	Name	Age	Ht.	Nickname	Status	PFL/Bellator record	MMA record
(Saudi Arabia)	Mostafa Abada Rashed Neda	38	5 ft 10 in (1.78 m)		Win - PFL MENA 11 (Riyadh) - Osama Elsaidy	3–1	10–4

=== Welterweights (170 lb, 77 kg) ===
ISO	Name	Age	Ht.	Nickname	Status	PFL/Bellator record	MMA record
(Kuwait)	Mohammad Alaqraa	26	5 ft 11 in (1.80 m)			5–1	10–1
(Morocco)	Badreddine Diani	N/A	6 ft 0 in (1.83 m)		Win - PFL MENA 11 (Riyadh) - Hazem Kayyali	5–1	12–4
(Palestine)	Omar Hussein	30	6 ft 1 in (1.85 m)	187	Loss - PFL MENA 11 (Riyadh) - Abdelkrim Zouad	1–2	12–8
(Algeria)	Abdelkrim Zouad	N/A	5 ft 10 in (1.78 m)		Win - PFL MENA 11 (Riyadh) - Omar Hussein	2–0	9–2
(Algeria)	Rayan Atmani	33	6 ft 1 in (1.85 m)		Win - PFL MENA 10 (Riyadh) - Eslam Mostafa	1–1	6–3
(Egypt)	Ahmed Darwish	N/A	5 ft 9 in (1.75 m)	The Egyptian Eagle	Loss - PFL MENA 10 (Riyadh) - Omar Hussein	1–1	6–2
(Jordan)	Hazem Kayyali	N/A	6 ft 2 in (1.88 m)		Loss - PFL MENA 11 (Riyadh) - Badreddine Diani	1–1	3–1–2
(Saudi Arabia)	Ahmed Albrahim	30	5 ft 10 in (1.78 m)	Saudi Hulk	Win - PFL MENA 9 (Dubai) - Ebrahem Mahmoud	1–0	1–0
(Lebanon)	Hassan Shaaban	25	5 ft 10 in (1.78 m)	Diaz	Loss - PFL MENA 10 (Riyadh) - Hazem Kayyali	0–1	7–2
(Morocco)	Wissame Akhmouch	N/A	5 ft 10 in (1.78 m)		Loss - PFL MENA 10 (Riyadh) - Abdelkrim Zouad	0–1	7–3
(Egypt)	Yousef Adel	24	6 ft 0 in (1.83 m)	El Arabawy	Loss - PFL MENA 10 (Riyadh) - Badreddine Diani	0–1	7–1
(Egypt)	Eslam Mostafa	31	6 ft 2 in (1.88 m)	Keliny	Loss - PFL MENA 10 (Riyadh) - Rayan Atmani	0–1	6–3

=== Lightweights (155 lb, 70 kg) ===
ISO	Name	Age	Ht.	Nickname	Status	PFL/Bellator record	MMA record
(Iran)	Mohsen Mohammadseifi	37	5 ft 5 in (1.65 m)			4–1	8–2
(Morocco)	Salah Eddine Hamli	28	6 ft 0 in (1.83 m)	SuperSalah	Loss - PFL MENA 9 (Dubai) - Ylies Djiroun	3–1	11–1
(Iraq)	Mohammad Fahmi	31	5 ft 10 in (1.78 m)	Soulkeeper	Win - PFL MENA 11 (Riyadh) - Ahmed El Sisy	3–1	7–1
(Algeria)	Ylies Djiroun	34	5 ft 10 in (1.78 m)	Broly	Win - PFL MENA 11 (Riyadh) - Assem Ghanem	2–2	26–9
(Lebanon)	Georges Eid	36	5 ft 10 in (1.78 m)	The Lebanese Bulldozer		2–2	11–6
(Egypt)	Ahmed El Sisy	N/A	5 ft 8 in (1.73 m)		Loss - PFL MENA 11 (Riyadh) - Mohammad Fahmi	2–2	8–3 (1 NC)
(Jordan)	Abdelrahman Alhyasat	N/A	5 ft 8 in (1.73 m)			2–0 (1 NC)	5–0 (1 NC)
(Kuwait)	Abdullah Saleem	N/A	5 ft 8 in (1.73 m)	White Gorilla	Loss - PFL MENA 9 (Dubai) - Georges Eid	0–2 (1 NC)	5–2 (1 NC)
(Egypt)	Assem Ghanem	N/A	5 ft 11 in (1.80 m)		Loss - PFL MENA 11 (Riyadh) - Ylies Djiroun	1–1	7–1
(Egypt)	Basel Shalaan	24	5 ft 7 in (1.70 m)		Win - PFL MENA 9 (Dubai) - Abdullah Saleem	1–0	7–1
(Iraq)	Hussein Fakher	35	5 ft 10 in (1.78 m)	Dragon	(May 21) Visa Issues - Out of PFL MENA 9 (Dubai) - Georges Eid	0–0	7–4 (2 NC)

=== Featherweights (145 lb, 66 kg) ===
ISO	Name	Age	Ht.	Nickname	Status	PFL/Bellator record	MMA record
(Saudi Arabia)	Abdullah Al-Qahtani	N/A	5 ft 9 in (1.75 m)	The Reaper		5–1	10–2
(Egypt)	Islam Reda	32	5 ft 9 in (1.75 m)	The Egyptian Zombie		5–0	15–1
(Morocco)	Taha Bendaoud	31	5 ft 8 in (1.73 m)	Atlas Lion	Loss - PFL Africa 3 (Casablanca) - Yanis Ghemmouri	2–3	5–3
(Morocco)	Rachid El Hazoume	34	5 ft 10 in (1.78 m)	Haz		2–2	11–4
(Algeria)	Elias Boudegzdame	33	5 ft 10 in (1.78 m)	Smile	Win - PFL MENA 10 (Riyadh) - Hussein Salem	2–1	21–9
(Algeria)	Yanis Ghemmouri	31	5 ft 9 in (1.75 m)	The Desert Warrior	Win - PFL Africa 3 (Casablanca) - Taha Bendaoud	2–1	14–4
(United Arab Emirates)	Mohammad Yahya	32	5 ft 9 in (1.75 m)	The UAE Warrior	Loss - PFL MENA 9 (Dubai) - Mehdi Saadi	1–2	12–7
(Tunisia)	Mehdi Saadi	33	5 ft 6 in (1.68 m)		Win - PFL MENA 11 (Riyadh) - Shadi Kabbani	2–0	8–2
(Syria)	Shadi Kabbani	N/A	5 ft 6 in (1.68 m)		Loss - PFL MENA 11 (Riyadh) - Mehdi Saadi	1–1	5–1
(Iraq)	Hussein Salem	33	5 ft 10 in (1.78 m)	Buffalo	Loss - PFL MENA 10 (Riyadh) - Elias Boudegzdame	0–2	13–7
(Egypt)	Ahmed Tarek	27	5 ft 10 in (1.78 m)	The Mental Rock	Loss - PFL MENA 10 (Riyadh) - Shadi Kabbani	0–2	7–2
(Bahrain)	Hamza Kooheji	33	5 ft 7 in (1.70 m)		Win - PFL MENA 9 (Dubai) - Taha Bendaoud	1–0	15–4

=== Bantamweights (135 lb, 61 kg) ===
ISO	Name	Age	Ht.	Nickname	Status	PFL/Bellator record	MMA record
(Jordan)	Nawras Abzakh	34	5 ft 7 in (1.70 m)	The Honey Badger		3–1	15–6 (1)
(Egypt)	Islam Youssef	N/A	5 ft 5 in (1.65 m)	Moksha		2–1	7–3
(Lebanon)	Ali Yazbeck	N/A	5 ft 9 in (1.75 m)			0–1	5–1–1

=== Flyweights (125 lb, 57 kg) ===
ISO	Name	Age	Ht.	Nickname	Status	PFL/Bellator record	MMA record
(Saudi Arabia)	Malik Basahel	25	5 ft 5 in (1.65 m)		Win - PFL MENA 10 (Riyadh) - Imad El Azami	4–0	4–0
(United Arab Emirates)	Hadi Omar Al Hussaini	N/A	5 ft 4 in (1.63 m)			1–1	6–1–1
(Bahrain)	Hamad Marhoon	N/A	5 ft 9 in (1.75 m)		Loss - PFL MENA 9 (Dubai) - Saher Qasmieh	1–1	1–1

=== Women's Atomweights (105 lb, 48 kg) ===
ISO	Name	Age	Ht.	Nickname	Status	PFL/Bellator record	MMA record
(Saudi Arabia)	Hattan Alsaif	N/A	5 ft 1 in (1.55 m)		Win - PFL MENA 10 (Riyadh) - Dania Ouhachi	1–0	1–0

== See also ==
- List of PFL champions
- List of PFL events
- List of current UFC fighters
- List of current ACA fighters
- List of current Brave CF fighters
- List of current Invicta FC fighters
- List of current KSW fighters
- List of current Oktagon MMA fighters
- List of current ONE fighters
- List of current Rizin FF fighters
- List of current Road FC fighters
