= PFL Dubai: Nemkov vs. Bilostenniy =

Professional Fighters League MMA event in 2026

- The poster for PFL Dubai: Nemkov vs. Bilostenniy
- Promotion: Professional Fighters League
- Date: November 14, 2026
- Venue: Coca-Cola Arena
- City: Dubai, United Arab Emirates

Event chronology
PFL Chicago: Carmouche vs. Bishop 2	PFL Dubai: Nemkov vs. Bilostenniy	PFL MENA 12: MMA's Most Wanted

PFL Dubai: Nemkov vs. Bilostenniy (also known as PFL Returns to Dubai) was a mixed martial arts event produced by the Professional Fighters League that took place on November 14, 2026, at Coca-Cola Arena in Dubai, United Arab Emirates.

== Background ==
The event marked the promotion's fifth visit to Dubai and first since PFL MENA 9 in May 2026.

A PFL Heavyweight Championship bout between then champion (also former Bellator Light Heavyweight World Champion) Vadim Nemkov and Sergey Bilostenniy headlined the event.

Abubakar Nurmagomedov and David Martinez were scheduled to compete at the event in a welterweight bout. However, Nurmagomedov pulled out for unknown reasons and was replaced by Saygid Izagakhmaev.

In addition, two fights originally scheduled for the event were removed from the event during the fight week: a featherweight bout between Asaël Adjoudj and 2021 PFL Featherweight Tournament winner Movlid Khaybulaev; and a welterweight bout between Khamzat Abaev and Leon Hill.

== Results ==
Main card (ESPN+)
Weight class				Method	Round	Time	Notes
Heavyweight	Sergey Bilostenniy	def.	Vadim Nemkov (c)	Decision (unanimous) (49–46, 48–47, 48–47)	5	5:00	(Note: For the PFL Heavyweight Championship.)
Welterweight	Patrick Habirora	def.	Omar El Dafrawy	Technical Submission (guillotine choke)	1	3:11
Heavyweight	Oleg Popov	def.	Pouya Rahmani	Decision (unanimous) (30–25, 30–26, 30–27)	3	5:00
Bantamweight	Jōji Gotō	def.	Sergio Pettis	Decision (unanimous) (30–27, 30–27, 30–27)	3	5:00
Bantamweight	Lewis McGrillen	def.	Nawras Abzakh	TKO (retirement)	1	5:00
Preliminary card (ESPN+)
Lightweight	Connor Hughes	def.	Shaqueme Rock	KO (punch)	2	1:04
Welterweight	Saygid Izagakhmaev	def.	David Martinez	Submission (rear-naked choke)	3	4:27
Lightweight	Akhmed Magomedov	def.	Alexei Pergande	Decision (unanimous) (29–28, 29–28, 30–27)	3	5:00
Featherweight	Ádám Borics	def.	Khasan Magomedsharipov	Submission (triangle armbar)	1	4:17
Heavyweight	Denis Goltsov	def.	Maxwell Djantou Nana	TKO (punches)	1	3:41
Welterweight	Ernesto Rodriguez	def.	Rhys McKee	TKO (punches)	1	2:28
Light Heavyweight	Khabib Nabiev	def.	Styve Ngono Essono	TKO (elbow and punches)	3	0:46
Women's Strawweight	Aleksandra Savicheva	def.	Jacinta Austin	Decision (unanimous) (30–27, 30–27, 29–28)	3	5:00

== See also ==
- 2026 in Professional Fighters League
- List of PFL events
- List of current PFL fighters
