= PFL Chicago: Carmouche vs. Bishop 2 =

Professional Fighters League MMA event in 2026

- The poster for PFL Chicago: Carmouche vs. Bishop 2
- Promotion: Professional Fighters League
- Date: October 16, 2026
- Venue: Wintrust Arena
- City: Chicago, Illinois, United States

Event chronology
PFL Africa 3: Morocco	PFL Chicago: Carmouche vs. Bishop 2	PFL Dubai: Nemkov vs. Bilostenniy

PFL Chicago: Carmouche vs. Bishop 2 (also known as PFL Chicago 2) was a mixed martial arts event produced by the Professional Fighters League that took place on October 16, 2026, at the Wintrust Arena in Chicago, Illinois, United States.

== Background ==
The event marked the promotion's fifth visit to Chicago and first since PFL Chicago: Pettis vs. McKee in April 2026.

A PFL Women's Flyweight Championship for the inaugural title between former Bellator Women's Flyweight World Champion (also a 2025 PFL Women's Flyweight Tournament winner) Liz Carmouche and Jena Bishop headlined the event. The pairing previously fought at PFL 9 (2025) in August 2025, where Carmouche won the 2025 PFL tournament by knockout in round three.

Two bouts reportedly scheduled for the event were removed from the event for unknown reasons including: a lightweight bout between Alexandr Shabliy and Landry Ward; and a heavyweight bout between 2024 PFL Heavyweight Tournament winner Denis Goltsov and Maxwell Djantou Nana.

At the weigh-ins, J.P. Saint Louis weighed in at 172.8 pounds, 1.8 pounds over the welterweight limit. He was fined a percentage of his purse, which went to Oualy Tandia. In addition, a women's strawweight bout between Benita van Rooij and Giuliany Perêa was removed from the event due to Perêa not being medically cleared.

== Results ==
Main card (ESPN2)
Weight class				Method	Round	Time	Notes
Women's Flyweight	Jena Bishop	def.	Liz Carmouche	Decision (unanimous) (48–47, 48–47, 48–47)	5	5:90	(Note: For the inaugural PFL Women's Flyweight Championship.)
Featherweight	Timur Khizriev	def.	Gabriel Braga	Decision (split) (29–28, 28–29, 29–28)	3	5:00
Bantamweight	Sarvarjon Khamidov	def.	Rafael do Nascimento	KO (punches)	1	1:49
Welterweight	Oualy Tandia	def.	J.P. Saint Louis	Decision (unanimous) (30–27, 29–28, 29–28)	3	5:00	(Note: Saint Louis missed weight (172.8 lb).)
Preliminary card (ESPN+)
Welterweight	Eliezer Kubanza	def.	Trey Waters	KO (punches)	1	1:36
Light Heavyweight	Emiliano Sordi	def.	Abraham Bably	TKO (punches)	2	3:13
Lightweight	Kevin Pease	def.	Cássio Barão	Submission (rear-naked choke)	1	3:28
Women's Flyweight	Shannon Clark	def.	Lucero Acosta	TKO (elbows)	3	1:59
Lightweight	Gamid Khizriev	def.	Michael Boylan	TKO (elbows)	1	3:04
Bantamweight	Cobey Fehr	def.	Rosario Romero	Technical Submission (rear-naked choke)	1	0:58
Lightweight	Levan Khabalaev	def.	Brock Hamer	TKO (knees and punches)	1	1:01
Women's Flyweight	Paulina Wiśniewska	def.	Chelsea Hackett	Decision (unanimous) (29–28, 29–28, 29–28)	3	5:00
Featherweight	Noah Hermosillo	def.	Caden Cox	TKO (body kick and punches)	3	1:43

== See also ==
- 2026 in Professional Fighters League
- List of PFL events
- List of current PFL fighters
