= PFL Washington DC: Jean vs. Rodriguez =

Professional Fighters League MMA event in 2026

- The poster for PFL Washington DC: Jean vs. Rodriguez
- Promotion: Professional Fighters League
- Date: July 25, 2026
- Venue: CareFirst Arena
- City: Washington, D.C., United States

Event chronology
PFL Austin: Eblen vs. Kasanganay 2	PFL Washington DC: Jean vs. Rodriguez	PFL New York: Nurmagomedov vs. Colgan

PFL Washington DC: Jean vs. Rodriguez was a mixed martial arts event produced by the Professional Fighters League that took place on July 25, 2026, at CareFirst Arena in Washington, D.C., United States.

== Background ==
The event marked the promotion's sixth visit to Washington, D.C., and first since PFL 9 (2024) in August 2024.

A PFL Welterweight Championship bout for the vacant title between 2025 PFL Welterweight Tournament winner Thad Jean and 2024 PFL Welterweight Tournament winner Shamil Musaev was scheduled to headline this event. Former champion Ramazan Kuramagomedov had been stripped of the title when he immediately announced his retirement after winning the title against Musaev in February. However, two days before the event, Musaev withdrew from the bout due to weight cut complications and was replaced by Ernesto Rodriguez.

2025 PFL Africa Bantamweight Tournament winner Nkosi Ndebele and Mando Gutierrez were scheduled to meet in a bantamweight bout at this event. However, Gutierrez withdrew for unknown reasons and was replaced by Brandon Davis.

During the fight week, there were a scheduled another several bouts changes made:

- A heavyweight bout between 2024 PFL Heavyweight Tournament winner Denis Goltsov and promotional newcomer Hasan Mezhiev was removed from the event for unknown reasons.
- Ernesto Rodriguez was scheduled to meet Magomed Umalatov in a welterweight bout, but Umalatov withdrew from the event and was replaced by Aaron McKenzie. In turn, Rodriguez was moved to fight against Jean in the title bout as main event after Musaev withdrew.
- Bryce Meredith was originally scheduled to face Jack Cartwright at this event, but Cartwright pulled out and was replaced by Michael Cyr.
- A light heavyweight bout between former interim Bellator Heavyweight World Champion Valentin Moldavsky and 2021 PFL Heavyweight Tournament winner Bruno Cappelozza not compete at the event due to Cappelozza's visa issues and the bout was moved to PFL Charlotte: Battle vs. Rosta on August 7.

== Results ==
Main card (ESPN)
Weight class				Method	Round	Time	Notes
Welterweight	Thad Jean	def.	Ernesto Rodriguez	TKO (punches)	3	2:44	(Note: For the vacant PFL Welterweight Championship.)
Light Heavyweight	Rafael Xavier	def.	Tyson Pedro	TKO (elbows)	1	4:59
Light Heavyweight	Rasul Magomedov	def.	Sullivan Cauley	Decision (unanimous) (29–28, 29–28, 29–28)	3	5:00
Welterweight	Eliezer Kubanza	def.	Chris Mixan	Submission (brabo choke)	2	2:34
Preliminary card (ESPN+)
Catchweight (140 lb)	Bryce Meredith	def.	Michael Cyr	Decision (unanimous) (30–27, 30–27, 30–27)	3	5:00
Catchweight (140 lb)	Nkosi Ndebele	def.	Brandon Davis	Decision (unanimous) (30–26, 30–26, 30–26)	3	5:00
Light Heavyweight	Coby Bradford	def.	Chad Yard	Submission (rear-naked choke)	2	1:57
Featherweight	Noah Hermosillo	def.	Jacob Pais	Decision (unanimous) (30–27, 30–27, 30–27)	3	5:00

== See also ==
- 2026 in Professional Fighters League
- List of PFL events
- List of current PFL fighters
