= Khasan Magomedsharipov =

Russian mixed martial arts fighter

- Born: October 6, 2000 (age 26); Saratov, Russia
- Height: 5 ft 11 in (180 cm)
- Weight: 145 lb (66 kg; 10.4 st)
- Division: Featherweight
- Reach: 71 in (180 cm)
- Style: Sanda
- Fighting out of: Makhachkala, Dagestan, Russia; Brick Township, New Jersey, U.S.
- Team: DagFighter; Ricardo Almeida BJJ; Nick Catone MMA; Eagles MMA
- Trainer: Mark Henry; Zabit Magomedsharipov
- Years active: 2019–present

Mixed martial arts record
- Total: 12
- Wins: 11
- By knockout: 3
- By submission: 5
- By decision: 3
- Losses: 1
- By submission: 1

Other information
- Notable relatives: Zabit Magomedsharipov (brother)
- Mixed martial arts record from Sherdog

Khasan Magomedsharipov (born 6 October 2000) is a Russian mixed martial artist who competes in the featherweight division in Bellator MMA. Khasan is the younger brother of former mixed martial artist fighter Zabit Magomedsharipov. At the age of 15 years, he won gold medal in European Junior Championship in Wushu Sanda in 2016. As of July 6, 2026, he is #10 in the PFL featherweight rankings.

== Early life ==
Khasan was born in Saratov, Saratov Oblast, Russia, on October 6, 2000, and is of Akhvakh ethnicity. He is the younger brother of former UFC fighter Zabit Magomedsharipov. As a child, he was a street hooligan, that shows in multiple scars on his head, wrists and elbow to this day. In order to discipline their child, his parents enrolled Khasan at "Five Directions of the World" Martial Arts Boarding School, where his brother Zabit and Muslim Salikhov was also alumni of.

At the age of 17, Khasan came under the guidance of the MMA coach Mark Henry. Khasan was allowed early to train with notable fighters like Eddie Alvarez, Edson Barboza, Frankie Edgar & Marlon Moraes.

His coach Mark Henry at one point, planned to enter Khasan at Diamond Gloves boxing tournament. Khasan and his brother Zabit were one of the main sparring partners for Frankie Edgar, during the fight camp preparation against Max Holloway and Jose Aldo.

Back in Dagestan, and recently, he has been training with fighters of Abdulmanap Nurmagomedov School/Eagles MMA.

== Mixed martial arts career ==
=== Russian MMA ===
Magomedsharipov made his professional MMA debut against Azeri fighter Amil Nasirov on December 6, 2019, at Gorilla Fighting 21. He won the fight via anaconda choke in round one.

Magomedsharipov faced Edil Esenkulov on December 25, 2019, at Gorilla Fighting 23. He won the fight via unanimous decision.

Magomedsharipov faced Timur Akaba on September 9, 2020, at FNG / GFC: Abdulmanap Nurmagomedov Memory Tournament. He won the fight via rear-naked choke in round one.

Magomedsharipov faced Dibir Amirmagomedov on September 26, 2020, at Kaganat Fighting League 2. He won the fight via twister in the first round.

Magomedsharipov faced Mikhail Tarkhanov on December 25, 2020, at AMC Fight Nights 99. He won the fight via TKO in round one.

=== Bellator MMA ===
In the promotional debut, Magomedsharipov was scheduled to face Nekruz Mirkhojaev on July 31, 2021, at Bellator 263. However, Mirkhojaev withdrew for unknown reasons and was replaced by Jonathan Quiroz. He won the fight via technical knockout in the first round.

Magomedsharipov faced Jose Sanchez on March 25, 2022, at Bellator 275. He won the fight via unanimous decision.

Magomedsharipov was scheduled to face Bailey Gilbert on March 25, 2023, at Bellator 291. However, Gilbert pulled out and was replaced by Rafael Hudson. He won the fight via technical knockout in the first round.

Magomedsharipov was scheduled to face Martin McDonough on September 23, 2023, at Bellator 299. However, McDonough was replaced by Piotr Niedzielski for unknown reasons. At weigh-ins, Niedzielski weighed in at 147.8 pounds, 1.8 pounds over the featherweight non-title limit. Due to this, the bout proceeded at catchweight and he was fined 20 percent of his purse, which went to Magomedsharipov. He won the fight via arm-triangle choke, after a successful takedown on the 3:58 minutes of the second round.

Magomedsharipov faced Tyler Mathison on June 22, 2024, at Bellator Champions Series 3. He won the fight by unanimous decision.

=== Professional Fighters League ===
Magomedsharipov was scheduled to face Nathan Kelly on January 25, 2025 at PFL Road to Dubai: Champions Series. On January 6, it was announced that he had pulled out for unknown reasons.

Magomedsharipov was scheduled to face Yves Landu on December 13, 2025, at PFL Lyon, but Landu withdrew and was replaced by Asaël Adjoudj. In turn, Magomedsharipov pulled out from the event and was replaced by Frederik Dupras.

Magomedsharipov was scheduled to face Levy Saúl Marroquín on June 27, 2026, at PFL San Diego. However, Marroquín pulled out from the event and was replaced by Joshua Weems. He won the fight via an arm-triangle choke in round one.

Magomedsharipov faced Ádám Borics on November 14, 2026, at PFL Dubai 2. He lost the fight via arm-triangle submission in the first round, marking the first loss of his MMA career.

== Personal life ==
Khasan is a fan of now defunct Pride Fighting Championships. He is an avid book reader who has read The Godfather novel in Russian and Islamic literature. Zabit, his older brother, is currently one of the main coaches of Khasan, and is helping him in making strategies, during fight camps.

== Championships and accomplishments ==
- (gold) 1x Junior European Championship of Wushu Sanda
- (gold) 4x Russian Championship of Wushu Sanda
- (gold) 4x Dagestani Championship of Wushu Sanda

== Mixed martial arts record ==
Professional record breakdown
12 matches	11 wins	1 loss
By knockout	3	0
By submission	5	1
By decision	3	0

Res.	Record	Opponent	Method	Event	Date	Round	Time	Location	Notes
Loss	11–1	Ádám Borics	Submission (triangle armbar)	PFL Dubai: Nemkov vs. Bilostenniy	November 14, 2026	1	4:17	Dubai, United Arab Emirates	
Win	11–0	Joshua Weems	Submission (arm-triangle choke)	PFL San Diego: McKee vs. Isbulaev	June 27, 2026	1	2:10	San Diego, California, United States	
Win	10–0	Tyler Mathison	Decision (unanimous)	Bellator Champions Series 3	June 22, 2024	3	5:00	Dublin, Ireland	
Win	9–0	Piotr Niedzielski	Submission (arm-triangle choke)	Bellator 299	September 23, 2023	2	3:58	Dublin, Ireland	Catchweight (147.8 lb) bout; Niedzielski missed weight.
Win	8–0	Rafael Hudson	TKO (punches)	Bellator 291	February 25, 2023	1	4:40	Dublin, Ireland	
Win	7–0	José Sanchez	Decision (unanimous)	Bellator 275	February 25, 2022	3	5:00	Dublin, Ireland	
Win	6–0	Jonathan Quiroz	TKO (punches)	Bellator 263	July 31, 2021	2	4:21	Inglewood, California, United States	
Win	5–0	Mikhail Tarkhanov	TKO (punches)	AMC Fight Nights 99	December 25, 2020	1	4:30	Moscow, Russia	
Win	4–0	Dibir Amirmagomedov	Submission (twister)	Kaganat Fighting League 2	September 26, 2020	1	2:22	Khasavyurt, Russia	
Win	3–0	Timur Akaba	Submission (rear-naked choke)	FNG / GFC: Abdulmanap Nurmagomedov Memory Tournament	September 9, 2020	1	3:48	Moscow, Russia	
Win	2–0	Edil Esenkulov	Decision (unanimous)	Gorilla Fighting 23	December 15, 2019	3	5:00	Almaty, Kazakhstan	Catchweight (150 lb) bout.
Win	1–0	Amil Nasirov	Submission (anaconda choke)	Gorilla Fighting 21	December 6, 2019	3	3:17	Samara, Russia	Featherweight debut.

== See also ==
- List of current Bellator MMA fighters
- List of male mixed martial artists
