= PFL MENA 11 =

Professional Fighters League MMA event in 2026

PFL MENA 11: Last Man Standing
- The poster for PFL MENA 11: Last Man Standing
- Promotion: Professional Fighters League
- Date: October 2, 2026
- Venue: Boulevard City
- City: Riyadh, Saudi Arabia

Event chronology
PFL Tampa: Cyborg vs. Vieira	PFL MENA 11: Last Man Standing	PFL Africa 3: Morocco

PFL MENA 11: Last Man Standing was a mixed martial arts event produced by the Professional Fighters League that took place on October 2, 2026, at the Boulevard City in Riyadh, Saudi Arabia.

== Background ==
A light heavyweight trilogy bout between Mostafa Rashed Neda and Osama Elsaidy headlined the event. This marked the third time meeting with the pair fought twice in 2016 at Desert Force Championship and each winning split their two bouts.

The event featured the semifinals of 2026 PFL MENA Tournament in a welterweight, lightweight and featherweight divisions.

== Results ==
Main card (YouTube / Vice TV)
Weight class				Method	Round	Time	Notes
Light Heavyweight	Mostafa Rashed Neda	def.	Osama Elsaidy	Submission (guillotine choke)	2	3:33
Welterweight	Badreddine Diani	def.	Hazem Kayyali	Submission (arm-triangle choke)	2	3:05	(Note: 2026 PFL MENA Welterweight Tournament Semifinal.)
Lightweight	Ylies Djiroun	def.	Assem Ghanem	TKO (punches)	1	3:06	(Note: 2026 PFL MENA Lightweight Tournament Semifinal.)
Featherweight	Mehdi Saadi	def.	Shadi Kabbani	Decision (split) (29–28, 28–29, 29–28)	3	5:00	(Note: 2026 PFL MENA Featherweight Tournament Semifinal.)
Preliminary card (YouTube / ViceTV)
Welterweight	Abdelkrim Zouad	def.	Omar Hussein	Decision (unanimous) (30–27, 29–28, 30–27)	3	5:00	(Note: 2026 PFL MENA Welterweight Tournament Semifinal.)
Lightweight	Mohammad Fahmi	def.	Ahmed El Sisy	Decision (unanimous) (29–28, 29–28, 30–27)	3	5:00	(Note: 2026 PFL MENA Lightweight Tournament Semifinal.)
Amateur bouts
Catchweight (139 lb)	Fatima Al Ammari	def.	Aya Lounes	TKO (knee and punches)	2	1:05
Bantamweight	Alridah Alnemar	def.	Ali Alshowakh	Decision (unanimous) (30–27, 30–27, 30–27)	3	3:00

== 2026 PFL MENA Tournament ==
=== 2026 PFL MENA Welterweight Tournament ===
Quarter-finals
(Egypt) Yousef Adel	3
(Morocco) Badreddine Diani	UD
(Lebanon) Hassan Shaaban	3
(Jordan) Hazem Kayyali	UD
(Morocco) Wissame Akhmouch	2
(Algeria) Abdelkrim Zouad	SUB
(Egypt) Ahmad Abdelbast Darwish	2
(Palestine) Omar Hussein	TKO

Semi-finals
(Morocco) Badreddine Diani	SUB
(Jordan) Hazem Kayyali	2
(Algeria) Abdelkrim Zouad	UD
(Palestine) Omar Hussein	3

Final
(Morocco) Badreddine Diani
(Algeria) Abdelkrim Zouad

=== 2026 PFL MENA Lightweight Tournament ===
Quarter-finals
(Morocco) Salah Eddine Hamli	1
(Algeria) Ylies Djiroun	TKO
(Egypt) Basel Shalaan	UD
(Kuwait) Abdullah Saleem	3
(Egypt) Assem Ghanem	–
(Iraq) Mohammad Fahmi	BYE (Note: Assem Ghanem has suffered an injury during the event, therefore Fahmi advanced to semifinal.)
(Egypt) Ahmed El Sisy	SD
(Iraq) Harda Karim	3

Semi-finals
(Algeria) Ylies Djiroun	TKO
(Egypt) Assem Ghanem (Note: Basel Shalaan missed weight, and was replaced by Assem Ghanem.)	1
(Iraq) Mohammad Fahmi	UD
(Egypt) Ahmed El Sisy	3

Final
(Algeria) Ylies Djiroun
(Iraq) Mohammad Fahmi

=== 2026 PFL MENA Featherweight Tournament ===
Quarter-finals
(Morocco) Taha Bendaoud	3
(Bahrain) Hamza Kooheji	UD
(Algeria) Elias Boudegzdame	SUB
(Iraq) Hussein Salem	1
(Egypt) Ahmed Tarek	3
(Syria) Shadi Kabbani (Note: Rachid El Hazoume withdrew from the tournament and was replaced by Shadi Kabbani.)	UD
(United Arab Emirates) Mohammad Yahya	3
(Tunisia) Mehdi Saadi	SD

Semi-finals
(Egypt) Islam Youssef	–
(Algeria) Elias Boudegzdame (Note: Hamza Kooheji withdrew from the tournament and was replaced by Islam Youssef, who in turn was unable to compete due to visa issues. Therefore Elias Boudegzdame advanced to final.)	BYE
(Syria) Shadi Kabbani	3
(Tunisia) Mehdi Saadi	SD

Final
(Algeria) Elias Boudegzdame
(Tunisia) Mehdi Saadi

== See also ==
- 2026 in Professional Fighters League
- List of PFL events
- List of current PFL fighters
