= PFL Africa 3 (2026) =

Professional Fighters League MMA event in 2026

PFL Africa 3: Morocco
- The poster for PFL Africa 3: Morocco
- Promotion: Professional Fighters League
- Date: October 10, 2026
- Venue: Mohammed V Sports Complex
- City: Casablanca, Morocco

Event chronology
PFL MENA 11: Last Man Standing	PFL Africa 3: Morocco	PFL Chicago: Carmouche vs. Bishop 2

2026 PFL Africa 3: Morocco was a mixed martial arts event produced by the Professional Fighters League that took place on October 10, 2026, at Mohammed V Sports Complex in Casablanca, Morocco.

== Background ==
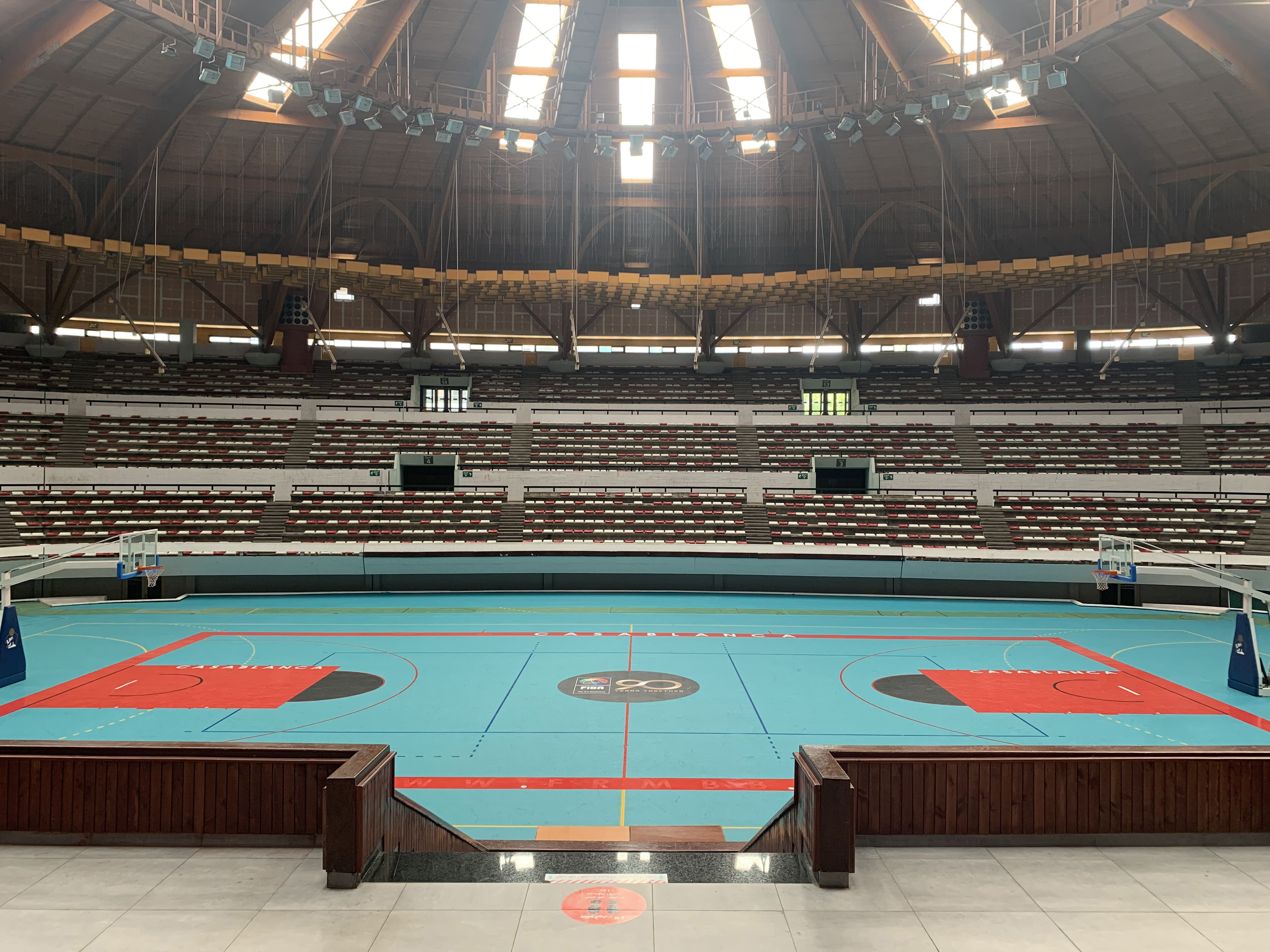
Mohammed V Sports Complex hosted the promotion's debut in Morocco, which became the 22nd country to hold a PFL and WSOF event.

A heavyweight bout between Abdoulaye Kane and Badr Medkouri headlined the event.

The event featured the semifinals of the 2026 PFL Africa Tournament in the welterweight, lightweight and bantamweight divisions.

At the weigh-ins, Shido Boris Esperança weighed in at 172 pounds, one pound over the welterweight tournament limit. He was fined a percentage of his purse, which went to Peace Nguphane.

A bantamweight tournament semifinal between Alain Majorique and Raphael Uchegbu was expected to take place at the event, but it was removed from the card for undisclosed reasons.

== Results ==
Main card (YouTube / Vice TV)
Weight class				Method	Round	Time	Notes
Heavyweight	Abdoulaye Kane	def.	Badr Medkouri	TKO (elbows)	1	4:06
Featherweight	Yanis Ghemmouri	def.	Taha Bendaoud	Decision (unanimous) (30–27, 30–27, 30–27)	3	5:00
Welterweight	Shido Boris Esperança	def.	Peace Nguphane	TKO (punches)	1	1:03	(Note: 2026 PFL Africa Welterweight Tournament Semifinal; Esperança missed weight (172 lb).)
Lightweight	Patrick Ocheme	def.	Cornel Thompson	KO (body kick)	1	2:46	(Note: 2026 PFL Africa Lightweight Tournament Semifinal.)
Welterweight	David Samuel	def.	Rivaldo Pereira	Decision (unanimous) (30–27, 30–27, 30–27)	3	5:00	(Note: 2026 PFL Africa Welterweight Tournament Semifinal.)
Preliminary card (YouTube / ViceTV)
Welterweight	Mouhamed Ba	def.	Yabna N'Tchalá	Decision (unanimous) (30–27, 30–27, 29–28)	3	5:00
Bantamweight	Reda Abdellaoui	def.	Salim Mhamdi	Submission (rear-naked choke)	1	2:11
Bantamweight	Dwight Joseph	def.	Boule Godogo	Decision (split) (29–28, 28–29, 29–28)	3	5:00	(Note: 2026 PFL Africa Bantamweight Tournament Semifinal.)
Lightweight	Demba Seck	vs.	Hussain Al Kurdi	No Contest (accidental knee to groin)	1	0:37	(Note: 2026 PFL Africa Lightweight Tournament Semifinal. Accidental knee to the groin rendered Seck unable to continue; the judge picked him advanced to the final.)
Catchweight (132 lb)	Jane Osigwe	def.	Sanaa Mandar	Decision (unanimous) (29–28, 29–28, 29–27)	3	5:00
Lightweight	Abderrahman Errachidy	def.	Oussama El Idrissi	Decision (unanimous) (29–28, 29–28, 30–27)	3	5:00

== 2026 PFL Africa Tournament ==
=== 2026 PFL Africa Welterweight Tournament ===
Quarter-finals
(Guinea-Bissau) Rivaldo Pereira (Note: Eliezer Kubanza withdrew from the tournament and was replaced by Rivaldo Pereira.)	TKO
(Nigeria) Kunle Lawal	1
(Nigeria) David Samuel	SUB
(Egypt) Abdelrahman Mohamed	1
(Angola) Shido Boris Esperança	TKO
(Cameroon) Emilios Dassi	1
(South Africa) Peace Nguphane	UD
(Guinea-Bissau) Yabna N'Tchalá	3

Semi-finals
(Guinea-Bissau) Rivaldo Pereira	3
(Nigeria) David Samuel	UD
(Angola) Shido Boris Esperança	TKO
(South Africa) Peace Nguphane	1

Final
(Nigeria) David Samuel
(Angola) Shido Boris Esperança

=== 2026 PFL Africa Lightweight Tournament ===
Quarter-finals
(Nigeria) Patrick Ocheme	KO
(Cameroon) Ayinda Octave	1
(Angola) Áureo Cruz (Note: Tshilomba Mikixi withdrew from the tournament and was replaced by Áureo Cruz.)	3
(Nigeria) Cornel Thompson	UD
(Senegal) Demba Seck	UD
(Benin) Jean Do Santos	3
(Chad) Hussain Al Kurdi	SUB
(Morocco) Abderrahman Errachidy	2

Semi-finals
(Nigeria) Patrick Ocheme	KO
(Nigeria) Cornel Thompson	1
(Senegal) Demba Seck	NC (Note: Accidental knee to the groin rendered Seck unable to continue; the judge picked him advanced to the final. .)
(Chad) Hussain Al Kurdi	1

Final
(Nigeria) Patrick Ocheme
(Senegal) Demba Seck

=== 2026 PFL Africa Bantamweight Tournament ===
Quarter-finals

Semi-finals

Final

(Tanzania) Dauda Rajabu
2

(Angola) Boule Godogo
TKO

(Angola) Boule Godogo
3

(Liberia) Dwight Joseph
SD

(Cameroon) Alain Majorique
3

(Liberia) Dwight Joseph
SD

(Liberia) Dwight Joseph

(Nigeria) Raphael Uchegbu

(Nigeria) Raphael Uchegbu
UD

(Mozambique) Edson Machavane
3

(Nigeria) Raphael Uchegbu (Note: Karim Henniene withdrew from the tournament and was replaced by Alain Majorique, who in turn missed weight. Therefore Raphael Uchegbu advanced to final.)
BYE

(Cameroon) Alain Majorique
–

(South Africa) Thimna Mhlauli
1

(Algeria) Karim Henniene
SUB

== See also ==
- 2026 in Professional Fighters League
- List of PFL events
- List of current PFL fighters
