= PFL Belfast: Kelly vs. Wilson =

Professional Fighters League MMA event in 2026

- The poster for PFL Belfast: Kelly vs. Wilson
- Promotion: Professional Fighters League
- Date: April 16, 2026
- Venue: SSE Arena
- City: Belfast, Northern Ireland

Event chronology
PFL Chicago: Pettis vs. McKee	PFL Belfast: Kelly vs. Wilson	PFL Sioux Falls: Storley vs. Zendeli

PFL Belfast: Kelly vs. Wilson was a mixed martial arts event produced by the Professional Fighters League that took place on April 16, 2026, at the SSE Arena in Belfast, Northern Ireland.

== Background ==
The event marked the promotion's second visit to Belfast and first since PFL Europe 1 (2025) in May 2025.

A lightweight bout between Paul Hughes and Jay-Jay Wilson was originally scheduled to headline the event. However, Hughes withdrew due to a knee injury while training and was replaced by undefeated prospect Darragh Kelly, who was originally slated to fight two-time LUX Lightweight Champion Sergio Cossio. Cossio's opponent in turn was replaced by Pedro Carvalho.

== Results ==
Main card (ESPN2 / ESPN Deportes)
Weight class				Method	Round	Time	Notes
Lightweight	Jay-Jay Wilson	def.	Darragh Kelly	KO (body kick and punches)	1	0:37
Catchweight (176 lb)	Rhys McKee	def.	Alex Lohoré	Decision (unanimous) (30–27, 30–27, 30–27)	3	5:00
Light Heavyweight	Dovletdzhan Yagshimuradov	def.	Tyson Pedro	Decision (unanimous) (29–28, 29–28, 29–28)	3	5:00
Preliminary card (ESPN+)
Welterweight	Eoin Sheridan	def.	Chris Mixan	Decision (unanimous) (29–28, 29–28, 29–28)	3	5:00
Featherweight	Caolán Loughran	def.	Alan Philpott	Submission (neck crank)	1	1:11
Welterweight	Omran Chaaban	def.	Chequina Noso Pedro	TKO (knee and punches)	2	4:16
Bantamweight	Dean Garnett	def.	Ciarán Clarke	KO (spinning back elbow and punches)	1	1:52
Catchweight (165 lb)	Pedro Carvalho	def.	Sergio Cossio	Decision (unanimous) (29–28, 29–28, 29–28)	3	5:00
Catchweight (176 lb)	David Martinez	def.	Giannis Bachar	Submission (rear-naked choke)	2	0:53
Bantamweight	Sean Gauci	def.	Liam Gittins	Decision (unanimous) (30–27, 30–27, 29–28)	3	5:00
Bantamweight	Eoghan Masoliver	def.	Shane Mullen	Submission (rear-naked choke)	1	1:55
Women's Flyweight	Chelsea Hackett	def.	Andrea Vázquez	Decision (unanimous) (30–27, 30–27, 30–27)	3	5:00

== See also ==
- 2026 in Professional Fighters League
- List of PFL events
- List of current PFL fighters
