= PFL New York: Nurmagomedov vs. Colgan =

Professional Fighters League MMA event in 2026

- The poster for PFL New York: Nurmagomedov vs. Colgan
- Promotion: Professional Fighters League
- Date: July 31, 2026
- Venue: UBS Arena
- City: Elmont, New York, United States

Event chronology
PFL Washington DC: Jean vs. Rodriguez	PFL New York: Nurmagomedov vs. Colgan	PFL Charlotte: Battle vs. Rosta

PFL New York: Nurmagomedov vs. Colgan (also known branded as PFL New York Presented by Arkham) was a mixed martial arts event produced by the Professional Fighters League that took place on July 31, 2026, at UBS Arena in Elmont, New York, United States.

== Background ==
The event marked the promotion's first visit to Elmont, its sixth hosted on Long Island, following PFL 3 (2019) in June 2019.

The event was headlined by a PFL Lightweight Championship bout between current champion Usman Nurmagomedov and undefeated contender Archie Colgan.

A women's flyweight bout between 2024 PFL Women's Flyweight Tournament winner (also a 2023 PFL Europe Women's Flyweight Tournament winner) Dakota Ditcheva and Denise Kielholtz served as the co-main event. The pairing was originally scheduled to meet at PFL Dubai: Nurmagomedov vs. Davis in January, but Ditcheva not competing due to injury.

During the fight week, there were a scheduled another several bouts changes made:

- A light heavyweight bout between 2024 PFL Light Heavyweight Tournament winner Dovletdzhan Yagshimuradov and Simeon Powell has been moved to PFL Charlotte: Battle vs. Rosta in one week later after the New York State Athletic Commission declined to license Powell due to a previous surgery.
- Promotional newcomers Moustapha Diakhaté and Zacharia Nishimwe were scheduled to meet in a light heavyweight bout, but Nishimwe pulled out from the event and was replaced by Darryl Walker.
- A light heavyweight bout Jamelle Jones and Khabib Nabiev was removed from the event due to the NYSAC refused to license with Jones.

== Results ==
Main card (ESPN)
Weight class				Method	Round	Time	Notes
Lightweight	Usman Nurmagomedov (c)	def.	Archie Colgan	KO (punches)	1	3:42	(Note: For the PFL Lightweight Championship.)
Women's Flyweight	Dakota Ditcheva	def.	Denise Kielholtz	Decision (unanimous) (30–27, 30–27, 30–27)	3	5:00
Lightweight	Amru Magomedov	def.	Angel Alvarez	TKO (punches)	2	4:28
Light Heavyweight	Moustapha Diakhaté	def.	Darryl King Walker	TKO (punches)	1	2:35
Preliminary card (ESPN+)
Bantamweight	Lázaro Dayron	def.	Raufeon Stots	Decision (split) (28–29, 29–28, 29–28)	3	5:00
Bantamweight	Sean Gauci	def.	Allan Begosso	Decision (unanimous) (30–27, 30–27, 30–27)	3	5:00
Catchweight (175 lb)	Omar El Dafrawy	def.	Jonathan Piersma	Decision (unanimous) (30–27, 29–28, 30–27)	3	5:00
Women Flyweight	Tatiana Postarnakova	def.	Montana De La Rosa	Decision (split) (29–28, 28–29, 29–28)	3	5:00
Lightweight	Levan Khabalaev	def.	Chamy Delva	TKO (knee to the body and punches)	1	1:44

== See also ==
- 2026 in Professional Fighters League
- List of PFL events
- List of current PFL fighters
