= PFL Pittsburgh: Eblen vs. Battle =

Professional Fighters League MMA event in 2026

- The poster for PFL Pittsburgh: Eblen vs. Battle
- Promotion: Professional Fighters League
- Date: March 28, 2026
- Venue: UPMC Events Center
- City: Moon Township, Pennsylvania, United States

Event chronology
PFL Madrid: van Steenis vs. Edwards 2	PFL Pittsburgh: Eblen vs. Battle	PFL Africa 1

PFL Pittsburgh: Eblen vs. Battle was a mixed martial arts event produced by the Professional Fighters League that took place on March 28, 2026, at the UPMC Events Center in Moon Township, Pennsylvania, United States.

== Background ==
The event marked the promotion's first visit to the Greater Pittsburgh area and second visit to the Commonwealth of Pennsylvania before it was rebranded promotion, since WSOF 13 in September 2014.

A middleweight bout between former Bellator Middleweight World Champion Johnny Eblen and The Return of The Ultimate Fighter: Team Volkanovski vs. Team Ortega middleweight tournament winner Bryan Battle headlined the event.

== Results ==
Main card (ESPN2)
Weight class				Method	Round	Time	Notes
Middleweight	Johnny Eblen	def.	Bryan Battle	Submission (rear-naked choke)	1	4:10
Middleweight	Impa Kasanganay	def.	Dalton Rosta	KO (punches)	1	3:18
Women's Flyweight	Ariane Lipski da Silva	def.	Sumiko Inaba	Decision (unanimous) (30–27, 30–27, 29–28)	3	5:00
Featherweight	Alexei Pergande	def.	Julio Arce	Decision (unanimous) (29–28, 29–28, 29–28)	3	5:00
Bantamweight	Lazaro Dayron	def.	Jacob Thrall	Decision (unanimous) (30–27, 29–28, 30–27)	3	5:00
Preliminary card (ESPN+)
Catchweight (140 lb)	Jack Cartwright	def.	Allan Begosso	Decision (split) (29–28, 27–29, 29–28)	3	5:00
Lightweight	Jakub Kaszuba	def.	Natan Schulte	Decision (unanimous) (30–27, 29–28, 29–28)	3	5:00
Lightweight	Dakota Bush	def.	Robert Watley	TKO (punches)	1	0:34
Welterweight	Ernesto Rodriguez	def.	Masayuki Kikuiri	Decision (majority) (28–28, 29–28, 29–28)	3	5:00
Women's Flyweight	Tatiana Postarnakova	def.	Elora Dana	Decision (unanimous) (30–27, 30–27, 30–27)	3	5:00
Welterweight	Josh Fremd	def.	Jarrah Al-Silawi	KO (punch)	3	3:57
Featherweight	Frederik Dupras	def.	Ethan Goss	Technical Submission (guillotine choke)	1	2:46

== See also ==
- 2026 in Professional Fighters League
- List of PFL events
- List of current PFL fighters
