= PFL Africa 1 (2026) =

Professional Fighters League MMA event in 2026

- The poster for PFL Africa 1
- Promotion: Professional Fighters League
- Date: April 10, 2026
- Venue: SunBet Arena
- City: Pretoria, South Africa

Event chronology
PFL Pittsburgh: Eblen vs. Battle	PFL Africa 1	PFL Chicago: Pettis vs. McKee

2026 PFL Africa 1: Pretoria was a mixed martial arts event produced by the Professional Fighters League that took place on April 10, 2026, at SunBet Arena in Pretoria, South Africa.

== Background ==
The event marked the promotion's first visit to Pretoria, which became the third city to hold the PFL events in South Africa.

A bantamweight bout between 2025 PFL Africa Bantamweight Tournament winner Nkosi Ndebele and Michele Clemente headlined the event.

The event featured the quarterfinals of 2026 PFL Africa Tournament in a welterweight division.

At the weigh-ins, two fighters missed weight:

- Jane Osigwe weighed in at 117.3 pounds, 1.3 pounds over the women's strawweight non-title fight limit.
- Felista Mugo weighed in at 116.7 pounds, 0.7 pounds over the women's strawweight non-title fight limit.

Osigwe and Mugo's bouts proceeded to catchweight. Both fighters was fined a percentage of her purses which went to their opponents Juliet Ukah and Annet Kiiza respectively.

== Results ==
Main card (YouTube / Vice TV)
Weight class				Method	Round	Time	Notes
Bantamweight	Nkosi Ndebele	def.	Michele Clemente	Decision (unanimous) (30–27, 30–27, 30–27)	3	5:00
Heavyweight	Justin Clarke	def.	Abdoulaye Kane	TKO (punches)	1	2:12
Welterweight	Peace Nguphane	def.	Yabna N'Tchalá	Decision (unanimous) (29–28, 29–28, 29–28)	3	5:00	(Note: 2026 PFL Africa Welterweight Tournament Quarterfinal.)
Welterweight	Shido Boris Esperança	def.	Emilios Dassi	TKO (elbows and punches)	1	3:17	(Note: 2026 PFL Africa Welterweight Tournament Quarterfinal.)
Welterweight	Rivaldo Pereira	def.	Kunle Lawal	TKO (punch to the body and elbows)	1	2:09	(Note: 2026 PFL Africa Welterweight Tournament Quarterfinal.)
Preliminary card (YouTube / Vice TV)
Women's Strawweight	Juliet Ukah	def.	Jane Osigwe	Decision (split) (30–27, 27–30, 29–28)	3	5:00	(Note: Osigwe missed weight (117.3 lb).)
Welterweight	David Samuel	def.	Abdelrahman Mohamed	Submission (rear-naked choke)	1	4:03	(Note: 2026 PFL Africa Welterweight Tournament Quarterfinal.)
Lightweight	Abdul Razac Sankara	vs.	Aureo Cruz	No Contest (accidental eye poke)	2	0:18	(Note: Accidental eye poke rendered Cruz unable to continue.)
Featherweight	Shadrick Dju Yemba	def.	Jean-Jacques Lubaya	Decision (split) (29–28, 28–29, 29–28)	3	5:00
Bantamweight	Asiashu Tshitamba	def.	Shannon van Tonder	Decision (unanimous) (30–27, 30–27, 30–27)	3	5:00
Women's Strawweight	Felista Mugo	def.	Annet Kiiza	Decision (unanimous) (30–27, 30–27, 30–26)	3	5:00	(Note: Mugo missed weight (116.7 lb).)

== 2026 PFL Africa Tournament ==
=== 2026 PFL Africa Welterweight Tournament ===
Quarter-finals
(Guinea-Bissau) Rivaldo Pereira (Note: Eliezer Kubanza withdrew from the tournament and was replaced by Rivaldo Pereira.)	TKO
(Nigeria) Kunle Lawal	1
(Nigeria) David Samuel	SUB
(Egypt) Abdelrahman Mohamed	1
(Angola) Shido Boris Esperança	TKO
(Cameroon) Emilios Dassi	1
(South Africa) Peace Nguphane	UD
(Guinea-Bissau) Yabna N'Tchalá	3

Semi-finals
(Guinea-Bissau) Rivaldo Pereira
(Nigeria) David Samuel
(Angola) Shido Boris Esperança
(South Africa) Peace Nguphane

Final

== See also ==
- 2026 in Professional Fighters League
- List of PFL events
- List of current PFL fighters
