= PFL San Diego: McKee vs. Isbulaev =

Professional Fighters League MMA event in 2026

- The poster for PFL San Diego: McKee vs. Isbulaev
- Promotion: Professional Fighters League
- Date: June 27, 2026
- Venue: Pechanga Arena
- City: San Diego, California, United States

Event chronology
PFL Africa 2	PFL San Diego: McKee vs. Isbulaev	PFL MENA 10

PFL San Diego: McKee vs. Isbulaev (also known branded as PFL San Diego Presented by GOVX) was a mixed martial arts event produced by the Professional Fighters League that took place on June 27, 2026, at the Pechanga Arena in San Diego, California, United States.

== Background ==
The event marked the promotion's first visit to San Diego.

A featherweight bout between former Bellator Featherweight World Champion A. J. McKee and undefeated prospect Salamat Isbulaev headlined this event.

Undefeated prospect Khasan Magomedsharipov was originally scheduled to face Levy Saúl Marroquín in a featherweight bout at this event. However, Marroquín pulled out from the event and was replaced by Joshua Weems.

At the weigh-ins, Sarvarjon Khamidov weighed in at 137.6 pounds, 1.6 pounds over the bantamweight non-title fight limit and he was fined a percentage of his purse, which went to Justtin Wetzell.

== Results ==
Main card (ESPN2)
Weight class				Method	Round	Time	Notes
Featherweight	A. J. McKee	def.	Salamat Isbulaev	Decision (unanimous) (30–27, 30–27, 30–27)	3	5:00
Women's Flyweight	Liz Carmouche	def.	Viviane Araújo	Submission (guillotine choke)	2	2:07
Lightweight	Alexandr Shabliy	def.	Alfie Davis	Decision (unanimous) (30–27, 30–27, 30–27)	3	5:00
Light Heavyweight	Rob Wilkinson	def.	Abraham Bably	TKO (punches)	2	3:23
Preliminary card (ESPN+)
Featherweight	Khasan Magomedsharipov	def.	Joshua Weems	Submission (arm-triangle choke)	1	2:10
Women's Flyweight	Jena Bishop	def.	Ariane Lipski da Silva	Submission (armbar)	1	4:08
Bantamweight	Sarvarjon Khamidov	def.	Justin Wetzell	Technical Submission (rear-naked choke)	2	4:11	(Note: Khamidov missed weight (137.6 lb).)
Women's Flyweight	Shannon Clark	def.	Ilara Joanne	TKO (knees and punches)	3	1:43
Bantamweight	Cobey Fehr	def.	Daniel Bzdigian	Submission (brabo choke)	1	2:00

== Reported payouts ==
The following is the reported payout to the fighters as reported by the California State Athletic Commission (CSAC). The amounts do not include sponsor money, discretionary bonuses, viewership points, or additional earnings.

- A. J. McKee: $100,000 (no win bonus) def. Salamat Isbulaev: $10,000
- Liz Carmouche: $100,000 (includes $50,000 win bonus) def. Viviane Araújo: $20,000
- Alexandr Shabliy: $50,000 (includes $25,000 win bonus) def. Alfie Davis: 20,000
- Rob Wilkinson: $40,000 (includes $20,000 win bonus) def. Abraham Bably: $10,000
- Khasan Magomedsharipov: $40,000 (includes $20,000 win bonus) def. Joshua Weems: $10,000
- Jena Bishop: $40,000 (includes $20,000 win bonus) def. Ariane Lipski da Silva: $13,000
- Sarvarjon Khamidov: $40,000 (includes $20,000 win bonus) def. Justin Wetzell: $10,000
- Shannon Clark: $6,000 (includes $3,000 win bonus) def. Ilara Joanne: $10,000
- Cobey Fehr: $10,000 (includes $5,000 win bonus) def. Daniel Bzdigian: $5,000

== Fight night weights ==
The following is the official weigh-in weights compared to the fight night weights reported by the California State Athletic Commission.

- A.J. McKee: 145.6 to 171.4 (25.8 pounds), 18%
- Salamat Isbulaev: 145.8 to 162.5 pounds (16.7 pounds), 11%
- Liz Carmouche: 126 to 147 pounds (21 pounds), 17%
- Viviane Araujo: 125.8 to 129.1 pounds (13.3 pounds), 11%
- Alexander Shabliy: 155.8 to 172.6 pounds (16.8 pounds), 11%
- Alfie Davis: 156 to 185.1 pounds (29.1 pounds), 19%
- Abraham Bably: 205.6 to 220.1 pounds (14.5 pounds), 7%
- Rob Wilkinson: 205.8 to 226.1 pounds (20.3 pounds), 10%
- Khasan Magomedsharipov: 145.8 to 163 pounds (17.2 pounds), 12%
- Joshua Weems: 146 to 163.5 pounds (17.5 pounds), 12%
- Ariane da Silva: 126 to 142 pounds (16 pounds), 13%
- Jena Bishop: 125 to 136 pounds (11 pounds), 9%
- Justin Wetzell: 135.6 to 158 pounds (22.8 pounds), 17%
- Sarvardzhon Hamido: 137.6 to 158.1 pounds (20.5 pounds), 15%
- Shannon Clark: 125.4 to 141.5 pounds (16.1 pounds), 13%
- Ilara Joanne: 124.8 to 137.2 pounds (12.4 pounds), 10%
- Cobey Fehr: 135.8 to 148.2 pounds (12.4 pounds), 9%
- Daniel Bzdigian: 135.6 to 142.5 (6.9 pounds), 5%

== See also ==
- 2026 in Professional Fighters League
- List of PFL events
- List of current PFL fighters
