= PFL Brussels: Habirora vs. Henderson =

Professional Fighters League MMA event in 2026

- The poster for PFL Brussels: Habirora vs. Henderson
- Promotion: Professional Fighters League
- Date: May 23, 2026
- Venue: ING Arena
- City: Brussels, Belgium

Event chronology
PFL Sioux Falls: Storley vs. Zendeli	PFL Brussels: Habirora vs. Henderson	PFL MENA 9

PFL Brussels: Habirora vs. Henderson was a mixed martial arts event produced by the Professional Fighters League that took place on May 23, 2026, at the ING Arena in Brussels, Belgium.

== Background ==
The event marked the promotion's second visit to Brussels and first since PFL Europe 2 (2025) in July 2025.

A welterweight bout between undefeated prospect Patrick Habirora and former WEC and UFC Lightweight Champion Benson Henderson headlined the event. Henderson came back from retirement and competed in an MMA fight for the first time since 2023, when he lost to Usman Nurmagomedov.

== Results ==
Main card (ESPN+)
Weight class				Method	Round	Time	Notes
Welterweight	Patrick Habirora	def.	Benson Henderson	KO (punches)	1	0:20
Bantamweight	Taylor Lapilus	def.	Jake Hadley	Decision (unanimous) (30–27, 30–27, 30–27)	3	5:00
Middleweight	Boris Mbarga Atangana	def.	Jared Gooden	KO (punches)	1	1:05
Bantamweight	Naoki Inoue	def.	Marcirley Alves	Decision (split) (27–30, 29–28, 29–28)	3	5:00
Featherweight	Asaël Adjoudj	def.	Keisuke Sasu	KO (head kick and punches)	2	2:22
Preliminary card (ESPN+)
Bantamweight	Gustavo Oliveira	def.	Baris Adiguzel	Submission (ninja choke)	2	1:10
Light Heavyweight	Donegi Abena	def.	Joe Schilling	TKO (retirement)	1	0:36	(Note: Abena was deducted one point in round 1 due to a headbutt.)
Bantamweight	Movsar Ibragimov	def.	Shane Campbell	Submission (rear-naked choke)	1	3:28
Welterweight	Khamzat Abaev	def.	Luca Poclit	KO (punches)	1	2:56
Featherweight	Adam Meskini	def.	Keweny Lopes	Decision (split) (29–28, 28–29, 29–28)	3	5:00
Welterweight	Ashley Reece	def.	Rustam Serbiev	Decision (unanimous) (29–28, 29–28, 29–28)	3	5:00

== See also ==
- 2026 in Professional Fighters League
- List of PFL events
- List of current PFL fighters
