= PFL Africa 2 (2026) =

Professional Fighters League MMA event in 2026

PFL Africa 2: Nigeria
- The poster for PFL Africa 2: Nigeria
- Promotion: Professional Fighters League
- Date: June 13, 2026
- Venue: Eko Convention Center
- City: Lagos, Nigeria

Event chronology
PFL MENA 9	PFL Africa 2: Nigeria	PFL San Diego: McKee vs. Isbulaev

2026 PFL Africa 2: Nigeria was a mixed martial arts event produced by the Professional Fighters League that took place on June 13, 2026, at the Eko Convention Center in Lagos, Nigeria.

== Background ==
The event marked the promotion's debut in Nigeria.

A featherweight bout between 2025 PFL Africa Featherweight Tournament winner Wasi Adeshina and Ignacio Campos headlined this event.

The event featured the quarterfinals of 2026 PFL Africa Tournament in a lightweight and bantamweight divisions.

== Results ==
Main card (YouTube / Vice TV)
Weight class				Method	Round	Time	Notes
Featherweight	Wasi Adeshina	vs.	Ignacio Campos	No Contest (overturned)	1	1:45	(Note: Originally a submission (rear-naked choke) win for Campos; overturned after he tested positive for banned substances.)
Lightweight	Patrick Ocheme	def.	Ayinda Octave	KO (punch and flying knee)	1	3:17	(Note: 2026 PFL Africa Lightweight Tournament Quarterfinal.)
Bantamweight	Karim Henniène	def.	Thimna Mhlauli	Technical Submission (anaconda choke)	1	2:23	(Note: 2026 PFL Africa Bantamweight Tournament Quarterfinal.)
Lightweight	Cornel Thompson	def.	Áuero Cruz	Decision (unanimous) (29–28, 29–28, 29–28)	3	5:00	(Note: 2026 PFL Africa Lightweight Tournament Quarterfinal.)
Middleweight	Jordan Fongno	def.	Yahaya Yahuza	TKO (punches)	2	3:35
Preliminary card (YouTube / Vice TV)
Bantamweight	Raphael Uchegbu	def.	Edson Machavane	Decision (unanimous) (30–27, 30–27, 30–27)	3	5:00	(Note: 2026 PFL Africa Bantamweight Tournament Quarterfinal.)
Women's Strawweight	Elisandra Ferreira	def.	Juliet Ukah	Submission (armbar)	2	1:39
Lightweight	Hussain Al Kurdi	def.	Abderrahman Errachidy	Submission (rear-naked choke)	2	1:23	(Note: 2026 PFL Africa Lightweight Tournament Quarterfinal.)
Bantamweight	Dwight Joseph	def.	Alain Majorique	Decision (split) (27–30, 29–28, 29–28)	3	5:00	(Note: 2026 PFL Africa Bantamweight Tournament Quarterfinal.)
Lightweight	Demba Seck	def.	Jean Do Santos	Decision (unanimous) (30–27, 30–27, 30–27)	3	5:00	(Note: 2026 PFL Africa Lightweight Tournament Quarterfinal.)
Bantamweight	Boule Godogo	def.	Dauda Rajabu	TKO (punches)	3	2:42	(Note: 2026 PFL Africa Bantamweight Tournament Quarterfinal.)
Light Heavyweight	Styve Ngono Essono	def.	Richard Muzaan	Decision (unanimous) (30–27, 30–27, 30–27)	3	5:00
Women's Strawweight	Miracle Chipito	def.	Haidy Ahmed	Submission (rear-naked choke)	2	4:49

== 2026 PFL Africa Tournament ==
=== 2026 PFL Africa Lightweight Tournament ===
Quarter-finals
(Nigeria) Patrick Ocheme	KO
(Cameroon) Ayinda Octave	1
(Angola) Áureo Cruz (Note: Tshilomba Mikixi withdrew from the tournament and was replaced by Áureo Cruz.)	3
(Nigeria) Cornel Thompson	UD
(Senegal) Demba Seck	UD
(Benin) Jean Do Santos	3
(Chad) Hussain Al Kurdi	SUB
(Morocco) Abderrahman Errachidy	2

Semi-finals
(Nigeria) Patrick Ocheme
(Nigeria) Cornel Thompson
(Senegal) Demba Seck
(Chad) Hussain Al Kurdi

Final

=== 2026 PFL Africa Bantamweight Tournament ===
Quarter-finals

Semi-finals

Final

(Tanzania) Dauda Rajabu
2

(Angola) Boule Godogo
TKO

(Angola) Boule Godogo

(Liberia) Dwight Joseph

(Cameroon) Alain Majorique
3

(Liberia) Dwight Joseph
SD

(Nigeria) Raphael Uchegbu
UD

(Mozambique) Edson Machavane
3

(Nigeria) Raphael Uchegbu

(Algeria) Karim Henniene

(South Africa) Thimna Mhlauli
1

(Algeria) Karim Henniene
SUB

== See also ==
- 2026 in Professional Fighters League
- List of PFL events
- List of current PFL fighters
