= PFL Sioux Falls: Storley vs. Zendeli =

Professional Fighters League MMA event in 2026

- The poster for PFL Sioux Falls: Storley vs. Zendeli
- Promotion: Professional Fighters League
- Date: May 2, 2026
- Venue: Sanford Pentagon
- City: Sioux Falls, South Dakota, United States

Event chronology
PFL Belfast: Kelly vs. Wilson	PFL Sioux Falls: Storley vs. Zendeli	PFL Brussels: Habirora vs. Henderson

PFL Sioux Falls: Storley vs. Zendeli was a mixed martial arts event produced by the Professional Fighters League that took place on May 2, 2026, at the Sanford Pentagon in Sioux Falls, South Dakota, United States.

== Background ==
The event marked the promotion's second visit to Sioux Falls and first since PFL 4 (2024) in June 2024.

A welterweight bout between former interim Bellator Welterweight World Champion Logan Storley and 2024 PFL Europe Welterweight Tournament winner Florim Zendeli headlined the event.

At the weigh-ins, a women's flyweight bout between Sabrinna de Sousa and Cheyanne Bowers was changed to 134-pound catchweight bout. Magomed Magomedov weighed in at 136.8 pounds, 0.8 pounds over the bantamweight non-title fight limit and he was fined a percentage of his purse, which went to former LFA Bantamweight Champion Leandro Higo.

== Results ==
Main card (ESPN2 / ESPN Deportes)
Weight class				Method	Round	Time	Notes
Welterweight	Logan Storley	def.	Florim Zendeli	Decision (unanimous) (30–25, 30–25, 30–25)	3	5:00	(Note: Zendeli was deducted two points in round 1 due to repeated grabbing the fence.)
Catchweight (160 lb)	Gadzhi Rabadanov	def.	Aleksandr Chizov	Decision (unanimous) (30–27, 29–28, 30–27)	3	5:00
Light Heavyweight	Simeon Powell	def.	Emiliano Sordi	TKO (knee)	3	3:05
Heavyweight	Sergey Bilostenniy	def.	Renan Ferreira	TKO (punches)	3	1:56
Bantamweight	Magomed Magomedov	def.	Leandro Higo	Decision (split) (30–27, 28–29, 30–27)	3	5:00	(Note: Magomedov missed weight (136.8 lb).)
Preliminary card (ESPN+)
Light Heavyweight	Rasul Magomedov	def.	Rafael Xavier	Decision (unanimous) (30–27, 30–27, 30–27)	3	5:00
Catchweight (134 lb)	Sabrinna de Sousa	def.	Cheyanne Bowers	Decision (unanimous) (29–28, 29–28, 29–28)	3	5:00
Featherweight	Kim Sang-won	def.	Humberto Bandenay	TKO (elbows)	2	2:56
Women's Flyweight	Taila Santos	def.	Yan Qihui	TKO (front kick to the body and punches)	1	2:02
Lightweight	Angel Alvarez	def.	Bryce Logan	Decision (unanimous) (30–27, 29–28, 29–28)	3	5:00
Welterweight	Brett Bye	def.	Taylor Michels	TKO (punches)	1	3:40
Heavyweight	Maxwell Djantou Nana	def.	Karl Williams	Decision (unanimous) (29–28, 30–27, 30–27)	3	5:00

== See also ==
- 2026 in Professional Fighters League
- List of PFL events
- List of current PFL fighters
