= PFL MENA 10 =

Professional Fighters League MMA event in 2026

PFL MENA 10: No Fear, No Mercy
- The poster for PFL MENA 10: No Fear, No Mercy
- Promotion: Professional Fighters League
- Date: July 10, 2026
- Venue: Boulevard City
- City: Riyadh, Saudi Arabia

Event chronology
PFL San Diego: McKee vs. Isbulaev	PFL MENA 10: No Fear, No Mercy	PFL Austin: Eblen vs. Kasanganay 2

PFL MENA 10: No Fear, No Mercy was a mixed martial arts event produced by the Professional Fighters League that took place on July 10, 2026, at the Boulevard City in Riyadh, Saudi Arabia.

== Background ==
The event was originally scheduled to take place on June 19 in Jeddah, Saudi Arabia. However on June 17, it was announced by the promotion that the event was postponed until further notice. On June 24, the promotion announced that the event was moved on July 10 in Riyadh, Saudi Arabia.

The event headliner featured Hattan Alsaif (4–0 in amateur record), who made her professional debut against Dania Ouhachi (1–1 in MMA record) in a 110 pounds catchweight bout.

The event featured the quarterfinals of 2026 PFL MENA Tournament in a welterweight and featherweight divisions.

== Results ==
Main card (YouTube / Vice TV)
Weight class				Method	Round	Time	Notes
Catchweight (110 lb)	Hattan Alsaif	def.	Dania Ouhachi	TKO (punches)	2	3:38
Welterweight	Hazem Kayyali	def.	Hassan Shaaban	Decision (unanimous) (29–28, 29–28, 29–27)	3	5:00	(Note: 2026 PFL MENA Welterweight Tournament Quarterfinal.)
Flyweight	Malik Basahel	def.	Imad El Azami	Decision (unanimous) (30–27, 30–27, 29–28)	3	5:00
Welterweight	Badreddine Diani	def.	Yousef Adel	Decision (unanimous) (29–28, 29–28, 29–28)	3	5:00	(Note: 2026 PFL MENA Welterweight Tournament Quarterfinal.)
Welterweight	Abdelkrim Zouad	def.	Wissem Akhmouch	Submission (face crank)	2	3:08	(Note: 2026 PFL MENA Welterweight Tournament Quarterfinal.)
Preliminary card (YouTube / Vice TV)
Featherweight	Shadi Kabbani	def.	Ahmed Tarek	Decision (unanimous) (29–28, 29–28, 29–28)	3	5:00	(Note: 2026 PFL MENA Welterweight Tournament Quarterfinal.)
Welterweight	Omar Hussein	def.	Ahmad Abdelbast Darwish	TKO (knees and punches)	2	3:49	(Note: 2026 PFL MENA Welterweight Tournament Quarterfinal.)
Featherweight	Elias Boudegzdame	def.	Hussein Salem	Technical Submission (triangle choke)	1	2:55	(Note: 2026 PFL MENA Featherweight Tournament Quarterfinal.)
Welterweight	Rayan Atmani	def.	Eslam Mostafa	KO (body kick)	1	4:50
Amateur bout
Featherweight	Saud Almolhem	def.	Abdel Haleem Nader	Decision (unanimous) (30–27, 30–27, 30–27)	3	3:00

== 2026 PFL MENA Tournament ==
=== 2026 PFL MENA Welterweight Tournament ===
Quarter-finals
(Egypt) Yousef Adel	3
(Morocco) Badreddine Diani	UD
(Lebanon) Hassan Shaaban	3
(Jordan) Hazem Kayyali	UD
(Morocco) Wissame Akhmouch	2
(Algeria) Abdelkrim Zouad	SUB
(Egypt) Ahmad Abdelbast Darwish	2
(Palestine) Omar Hussein	TKO

Semi-finals
(Morocco) Badreddine Diani
(Jordan) Hazem Kayyali
(Algeria) Abdelkrim Zouad
(Palestine) Omar Hussein

Final

=== 2026 PFL MENA Featherweight Tournament ===
Quarter-finals
(Morocco) Taha Bendaoud	3
(Bahrain) Hamza Kooheji	UD
(Algeria) Elias Boudegzdame	SUB
(Iraq) Hussein Salem	1
(Egypt) Ahmed Tarek	3
(Syria) Shadi Kabbani (Note: Rachid El Hazoume withdrew from the tournament and was replaced by Shadi Kabbani.)	UD
(United Arab Emirates) Mohammad Yahya	3
(Tunisia) Mehdi Saadi	SD

Semi-finals
(Bahrain) Hamza Kooheji
(Algeria) Elias Boudegzdame
(Syria) Shadi Kabbani
(Tunisia) Mehdi Saadi

Final

== See also ==
- 2026 in Professional Fighters League
- List of PFL events
- List of current PFL fighters
