= Elisandra Ferreira =

Brazilian mixed martial arts (MMA) fighter (born 1998)

- Born: Elisandra Ferreira de Oliveira; March 19, 1998 (age 28); Pouso Alegre, Minas Gerais, Brazil
- Other names: Lili
- Height: 5 ft 1 in (1.55 m)
- Weight: 105 lb (48 kg; 7 st 7 lb)
- Division: Atomweight
- Fighting out of: Congonhal, Minas Gerais, Brazil
- Team: Mesquita Bros
- Years active: 2019–present

Mixed martial arts record
- Total: 12
- Wins: 10
- By knockout: 1
- By submission: 1
- By decision: 8
- Losses: 2
- By decision: 2

Other information
- Mixed martial arts record from Sherdog

Elisandra Ferreira de Oliveira (born March 19, 1998) is a Brazilian mixed martial artist who competes in the atomweight division of the Invicta Fighting Championships, where she is the atomweight champion, and the 2026 interim strawweight champion of Karate Combat.

== Mixed martial arts career ==
=== Early career ===
Ferreira started her professional MMA career in 2019. In Brazil, she amassed a record of 4–1, which included winning the NCF atomweight title at Nação Cyborg 10. Prior to being signed by Invicta, she fought Anastasia Nikolakakos for the PAWFC atomweight title at PAWFC 2 and lost the bout.

=== Invicta FC ===
In her Invicta debut, Ferreira faced Marisa Messer-Belenchia at Invicta FC 51 on January 18, 2023. She won the fight via split decision.

Ferreira faced Flor Hernandez at Invicta FC 53 on May 3, 2023. She won the fight by unanimous decision.

Ferreira faced Katie Saull at Invicta FC 55: Bernardo vs. Rubin on June 28, 2024. She won the bout via unanimous decision.

==== Invicta FC Atomweight champion ====
Ferreira faced Andressa Romero for the vacant the atomweight championship at Invicta FC 57: Ferreira vs. Romero on September 20, 2024. She won the bout by unanimous decision to win the title.

Ferreira made her first title defense against Ana Palacios for the Atomweight Championship at Invicta FC 61 on April 4, 2025. She won the fight by unanimous decision.

=== Professional Fighters League ===
On April 23, 2026, it was reported that Ferreira signed with the Professional Fighters League.

Ferreira made her PFL debut against Juliet Ukah on June 13, 2026, at PFL Africa 2. She won the fight via an armbar in round two.

== Championships and accomplishments ==
- Invicta Fighting Championships
  - Invicta FC Atomweight Championship (One time; current)
- Nação Cyborg Fights
  - Nação Cyborg Atomweight Championship (One time)
- Karate Combat
  - 2026 Interim Karate Combat Strawweight Champion

== Mixed martial arts record ==
Professional record breakdown
12 matches	10 wins	2 losses
By knockout	1	0
By submission	1	0
By decision	8	2

Res.	Record	Opponent	Method	Event	Date	Round	Time	Location	Notes
Win	10–2	Juliet Ukah	Submission (armbar)	PFL Africa 2 (2026)	June 13, 2026	2	1:39	Lagos, Nigeria	Return to Strawweight.
Win	9–2	Ana Palacios	Decision (unanimous)	Invicta FC 61	April 4, 2025	5	5:00	Shawnee, Oklahoma, United States	Defended the Invicta FC Atomweight Championship.
Win	8–2	Andressa Romero	Decision (unanimous)	Invicta FC 57	September 20, 2024	3	5:00	Kansas City, Kansas, United States	Won the vacant Invicta FC Atomweight Championship.
Win	7–2	Katie Saull	Decision (unanimous)	Invicta FC 55	June 28, 2024	3	5:00	Kansas City, Kansas, United States	
Win	6–2	Flor Hernandez	Decision (unanimous)	Invicta FC 53	May 3, 2023	3	5:00	Denver, Colorado, United States	
Win	5–2	Marisa Messer-Belenchia	Decision (split)	Invicta FC 51	January 18, 2023	3	5:00	Denver, Colorado, United States	
Loss	4–2	Anastasia Nikolakakos	Technical Decision (unanimous)	Pallas Athena Women's FC 2	August 27, 2022	3	5:00	Calgary, Alberta, Canada	For the vacant PAWFC Atomweight Championship.
Win	4–1	Maria Ribeiro	Decision (unanimous)	Nação Cyborg 10	October 21, 2021	3	5:00	São José dos Pinhais, Brazil	Won the vacant Nação Cyborg Atomweight Championship.
Win	3–1	Keismilyn Shayene	Decision (split)	Nação Cyborg 8	May 27, 2021	3	5:00	Piraquara, Brazil	Atomweight debut.
Loss	2–1	Thaiany Lopes	Decision (unanimous)	Federal Fight 2	September 5, 2020	3	5:00	Taguatinga, Brazil	
Win	2–0	Beatriz Gomes	Decision (unanimous)	Federação Fight 2	November 30, 2019	3	5:00	Belo Horizonte, Brazil	
Win	1–0	Carine Cruz	TKO (punches)	Pentagon Combat 22	March 23, 2019	2	3:30	Machado, Brazil	Strawweight debut.

== Karate Combat record ==
Professional record breakdown
2 matches	2 wins	0 losses
By decision	2	0

Res.	Record	Opponent	Method	Event	Date	Round	Time	Location	Notes
Win	2–0	Monika Chochlíková	Decision (unanimous)	Karate Combat 59	2026-02-13	5	3:00	Miami, Florida, USA	Won the interim Women's Strawweight title.
Win	1–0	Jade Jorand	Decision (unanimous)	Karate Combat 57	2025-10-31	3	3:00	Miami, Florida, USA	
