= PFL Charlotte: Battle vs. Rosta =

Professional Fighters League MMA event in 2026

- The poster for PFL Charlotte: Battle vs. Rosta
- Promotion: Professional Fighters League
- Date: August 7, 2026
- Venue: Bojangles Coliseum
- City: Charlotte, North Carolina, United States

Event chronology
PFL New York: Nurmagomedov vs. Colgan	PFL Charlotte: Battle vs. Rosta	PFL Tampa: Cyborg vs. Vieira

PFL Charlotte: Battle vs. Rosta was a mixed martial arts event produced by the Professional Fighters League that took place on August 7, 2026, at Bojangles Coliseum in Charlotte, North Carolina, United States.

== Background ==
The event marked the promotion's second visit to Charlotte and first since PFL 9 (2025) in August 2025.

A middleweight bout between The Return of The Ultimate Fighter: Team Volkanovski vs. Team Ortega middleweight winner Bryan Battle and Dalton Rosta headlined this event.

== Results ==
Main card (ESPN)
Weight class				Method	Round	Time	Notes
Middleweight	Bryan Battle	def.	Dalton Rosta	Decision (split) (29–28, 28–29, 29–28)	3	5:00
Light Heavyweight	Simeon Powell	def.	Dovletdzhan Yagshimuradov	Decision (split) (28–29, 30–27, 30–27)	3	5:00
Middleweight	Aaron Jeffrey	def.	Joshua Silveira	Decision (unanimous) (30–27, 30–27, 30–26)	3	5:00
Bantamweight	Lewis McGrillen	def.	Brandon Lewis	Decision (unanimous) (30–27, 29–28, 29–28)	3	5:00
Middleweight	Josh Fremd	def.	Jhony Gregory	TKO (punches)	2	1:44
Preliminary card (ESPN+)
Heavyweight	Denis Goltsov	def.	Hasan Mezhiev	TKO (head kick and punches)	1	0:52
Featherweight	Cheyden Leialoha	def.	Robbie Ring	Decision (unanimous) (30–27, 30–27, 30–27)	3	5:00
Women's Flyweight	Cheyanne Bowers	def.	Elora Dana	Technical Submission (rear-naked choke)	1	3:36
Lightweight	Landry Ward	def.	Michael Boylan	Decision (split) (30–27, 28–29, 30–27)	3	5:00
Light Heavyweight	Bruno Cappelozza	def.	Valentin Moldavsky	Decision (unanimous) (29–28, 30–27, 29–28)	3	5:00
Lightweight	Jonathan Martin	def.	Wilson Lopshire	Decision (unanimous) (30–26, 30–25, 30–27)	3	5:00
Heavyweight	Maxwell Djantou Nana	def.	Eduardo Neves	TKO (punch to the body)	3	2:01
Lightweight	Trey Waters	def.	Trukon Carson	TKO (punches and elbows)	1	4:37

== See also ==
- 2026 in Professional Fighters League
- List of PFL events
- List of current PFL fighters
