= PFL MENA 9 =

Professional Fighters League MMA event in 2026

PFL MENA 9: Pride of Arabia
- The poster for PFL MENA 9: Pride of Arabia
- Promotion: Professional Fighters League
- Date: May 24, 2026
- Venue: Coca-Cola Arena
- City: Dubai, United Arab Emirates

Event chronology
PFL Brussels: Habirora vs. Henderson	PFL MENA 9: Pride of Arabia	PFL Africa 2

PFL MENA 9: Pride of Arabia was a mixed martial arts event produced by the Professional Fighters League that took place on May 24, 2026, at Coca-Cola Arena in Dubai, United Arab Emirates.

== Background ==
The event marked the promotion's fourth visit to Dubai and first since PFL Dubai: Nurmagomedov vs. Davis in February 2026. It was the first time of PFL MENA event hosted outside Saudi Arabia.

The event was originally scheduled to take place on May 8, 2026, in Khobar, Saudi Arabia and it was called the event as "Rise of the Gulf". However on April 9, it was announced that the event has been postponed due to the impacts from the 2026 Iran War.

The event featured the quarterfinals of 2026 PFL MENA Tournament in a lightweight and featherweight divisions.

During the event, it was announced during the broadcast that the lightweight tournament quarterfinal between Mohammad Fahmi and Assem Ghanem was removed from the event due to Ghanem's suffered an injury. Therefore, Fahmi will advance to semifinal of the tournament.

== Results ==
Main card (YouTube / Vice TV)
Weight class				Method	Round	Time	Notes
Featherweight	Mehdi Saadi	def.	Mohammad Yahya	Decision (split) (27–30, 30–27, 29–28)	3	5:00	(Note: 2026 PFL MENA Featherweight Tournament Quarterfinal.)
Lightweight	Ylies Djiroun	def.	Salah Eddine Hamli	TKO (punches)	1	4:20	(Note: 2026 PFL MENA Lightweight Tournament Quarterfinal.)
Featherweight	Hamza Kooheji	def.	Taha Bendaoud	Decision (unanimous) (29–28, 29–28, 29–28)	3	5:00	(Note: 2026 PFL MENA Featherweight Tournament Quarterfinal.)
Women's Strawweight (Amateur)	Zamzam Al Hammadi	def.	Abeer Mansour	Decision (unanimous) (29–28, 29–28, 29–28)	3	3:00
Preliminary card (YouTube / Vice TV)
Lightweight	Basel Shalaan	def.	Abdullah Saleem	Decision (unanimous) (30–27, 29–28, 29–28)	3	5:00	(Note: 2026 PFL MENA Lightweight Tournament Quarterfinal.)
Lightweight	Ahmed El Sisy	def.	Harda Karim	Decision (split) (29–28, 28–29, 29–28)	3	5:00	(Note: 2026 PFL MENA Lightweight Tournament Quarterfinal.)
Flyweight	Saher Qasmieh	def.	Hamad Marhoon	Decision (split) (29–28, 28–29, 29–28)	3	5:00
Welterweight	Ahmed Albrahim	def.	Ibrahim Mahmoud	TKO (punches)	3	2:47
Amateur bouts
Featherweight	Butti Suwaid Alameri	def.	Hamada Osman	Decision (unanimous) (30–27, 30–27, 30–27)	3	3:00

== 2026 PFL MENA Tournament ==
=== 2026 PFL MENA Lightweight Tournament ===
Quarter-finals
(Morocco) Salah Eddine Hamli	1
(Algeria) Ylies Djiroun	TKO
(Egypt) Basel Shalaan	UD
(Kuwait) Abdullah Saleem	3
(Egypt) Assem Ghanem	–
(Iraq) Mohammad Fahmi	BYE (Note: Assem Ghanem has suffered an injury during the event, therefore Fahmi advanced to semifinal.)
(Egypt) Ahmed El Sisy	SD
(Iraq) Harda Karim	3

Semi-finals
(Algeria) Ylies Djiroun
(Egypt) Basel Shalaan
(Iraq) Mohammad Fahmi
(Egypt) Ahmed El Sisy

Final

=== 2026 PFL MENA Featherweight Tournament ===
Quarter-finals
(Morocco) Taha Bendaoud	3
(Bahrain) Hamza Kooheji	UD
(Algeria) Elias Boudegzdame
(Iraq) Hussein Salem
(Egypt) Ahmed Tarek
(Morocco) Rachid El Hazoume
(United Arab Emirates) Mohammad Yahya	3
(Tunisia) Mehdi Saadi	SD

Semi-finals
(Bahrain) Hamza Kooheji
(Tunisia) Mehdi Saadi

Final

== See also ==
- 2026 in Professional Fighters League
- List of PFL events
- List of current PFL fighters
