= Chelsea Hackett =

Australian mixed martial artist

- Born: Chelsea Alysse Hackett; October 29, 1999 (age 27); Melbourne, Victoria, Australia
- Other names: Ham Sandwich
- Nationality: Australian
- Height: 5 ft 5 in (1.65 m)
- Weight: 135 lb (61 kg; 9.6 st)
- Division: Flyweight (116-125 Ib) (MMA); Lightweight (Kickboxing)
- Reach: 68 in (173 cm)
- Style: Muay Thai, Kickboxing, Boxing, Taekwondo
- Stance: Orthodox
- Fighting out of: Gold Coast, Australia
- Team: The Fight Centre Brisbane

Kickboxing record
- Total: 23
- Wins: 16
- Losses: 4
- Draws: 3

Mixed martial arts record
- Total: 10
- Wins: 5
- By knockout: 1
- By submission: 1
- By decision: 3
- Losses: 4
- By knockout: 2
- By submission: 1
- By decision: 1
- Draws: 1

Other information
- Mixed martial arts record from Sherdog

Chelsea Hackett (born October 29, 1999) is an Australian kickboxer, mixed martial artist and muay thai fighter competing in the Women's Flyweight division.

== Early life ==
Hackett was born in Melbourne and moved with her family to the Gold Coast at an early age. She attended St Andrews Lutheran College throughout her upbringing and began her martial arts journey at an after school Taekwando program at eight years old. By the age of 12, Hackett had achieved a junior black belt in Taekwando and sought out a new challenge in the form of Muay Thai under the tutelage of 10-time world champion John Wayne Parr at his Boonchu Gym on the Gold Coast. She won gold medals at the IFMA World Muaythai Championships in both 2014 and 2015 on her way to amassing a professional Muay Thai record of 16-4-3, which included two world title victories and winning the WBC World Lightweight Championship. Hackett transitioned into Mixed martial arts full-time in 2019 and adopted the nickname Ham Sandwich.

== Mixed martial arts career ==
Hackett made her professional MMA debut in May 2019 for Australia's Eternal MMA promotion walked away with a majority draw that would have been a unanimous decision victory had she not been deducted a point in the first round for holding the fence. She competed for the Eternal MMA promotion three more times over the following 12 months and was victorious in every bout. Hackett was then invited to compete at Dana White's Contender Series 36 where she fought and lost to Victoria Leonardo on November 17, 2020 for an UFC contract.

Hackett signed with PFL and debuted at PFL 7 on August 4, 2023 against Ky Bennett, submitting her in the second round via rear-naked choke.

Hackett faced Jena Bishop at PFL 1 on April 4, 2024 and lost the bout by an armbar submission.

Hackett faced Dakota Ditcheva on June 13, 2024 at PFL 4. She lost the fight via body punch TKO in the first round.

Hackett faced Andrea Vázquez on April 16, 2026, at PFL Belfast. She won the fight via unanimous decision.

Hackett faced Paulina Wiśniewska on October 16, 2026, at PFL Chicago 2. She lost the fight via unanimous decision.

On November 11, 2026, it was announced that Hackett was released from her PFL contract.

== Championships and accomplishments ==
=== Muay Thai ===
- WMC Muaythai Female Super Lightweight World Champion

== Mixed martial arts record ==
Professional record breakdown
10 matches	5 wins	4 losses
By knockout	1	2
By submission	1	1
By decision	3	1
Draws	1	

Res.	Record	Opponent	Method	Event	Date	Round	Time	Location	Notes
Loss	5–4–1	Paulina Wiśniewska	Decision (unanimous)	PFL Chicago: Carmouche vs. Bishop 2	October 16, 2026	3	5:00	Chicago, Illinois, United States	
Win	5–3–1	Andrea Vázquez	Decision (unanimous)	PFL Belfast: Kelly vs. Wilson	April 16, 2026	3	5:00	Belfast, Northern Ireland	
Loss	4–3–1	Dakota Ditcheva	TKO (punch to the body)	PFL 4 (2024)	June 13, 2024	1	3:22	Uncasville, Connecticut, United States	
Loss	4–2–1	Jena Bishop	Submission (armbar)	PFL 1 (2024)	April 4, 2024	1	4:15	San Antonio, Texas, United States	
Win	4–1–1	Ky Bennett	Submission (rear-naked choke)	PFL 7 (2023)	August 4, 2023	2	4:42	San Antonio, Texas, United States	
Loss	3–1–1	Victoria Leonardo	TKO (punches)	Dana White's Contender Series 36	November 17, 2020	2	4:41	Las Vegas, Nevada, United States	
Win	3–0–1	Rhiannon Thompson	Decision (unanimous)	Eternal MMA 52	March 7, 2020	3	5:00	Gold Coast, Australia	
Win	2–0–1	Nicole Szepesvary	KO (slam)	Eternal MMA 49	November 1, 2019	2	0:08	Gold Coast, Australia	
Win	1–0–1	Danielle Hayes	Decision (unanimous)	Eternal MMA 46	July 27, 2019	3	5:00	Melbourne, Australia	Flyweight debut.
Draw	0–0–1	Mel Zeman	Draw (majority)	Eternal MMA 45	May 25, 2019	3	5:00	Gold Coast, Australia	Bantamweight debut.

== Television appearances ==
In 2021, Hackett competed on Australian Survivor: Brains V Brawn.
