= PFL Chicago: Pettis vs. McKee =

Professional Fighters League MMA event in 2026

- The poster for PFL Chicago: Pettis vs. McKee
- Promotion: Professional Fighters League
- Date: April 11, 2026
- Venue: Wintrust Arena
- City: Chicago, Illinois, United States

Event chronology
PFL Africa 1	PFL Chicago: Pettis vs. McKee	PFL Belfast: Kelly vs. Wilson

PFL Chicago: Pettis vs. McKee was a mixed martial arts event produced by the Professional Fighters League that took place on April 11, 2026, at the Wintrust Arena in Chicago, Illinois, United States.

== Background ==
The event marked the promotion's fourth visit to Chicago and first since PFL 7 (2025) in June 2025.

A bantamweight bout between former Bellator Bantamweight World Champion Sergio Pettis and undefeated prospect Mitchell McKee headlined the event.

At the weigh-ins, two fighters missed weight:

- Shanna Young weighed in at 128.2 pounds, 2.2 pounds over the flyweight non-title fight limit.
- Dashiande Harris-Moore weighed in at 159 pounds, 3 pounds over the lightweight non-title fight limit.

Young and Harris-Moore's bouts proceeded at catchweight. Both fighters were fined 20 percent of their individual purses which went to their opponents Viviane Araújo and Biaggio Ali Walsh respectively.

Before the event started, a middleweight co-main event bout between Jordan Newman and former LFA Middleweight and Light Heavyweight Champion Joshua Silveira was removed from the event after Newman made the last-minute withdrawal due to undisclosed reasons.

== Results ==
Main card (ESPN2 / ESPN Deportes)
Weight class				Method	Round	Time	Notes
Bantamweight	Mitchell McKee	def.	Sergio Pettis	Decision (unanimous) (29–28, 29–28, 29–28)	3	5:00
Bantamweight	Renat Khavalov	def.	Raufeon Stots	Decision (unanimous) (29–28, 29–28, 29–28)	3	5:00
Women's Flyweight	Viviane Araújo	def.	Shanna Young	Decision (unanimous) (30–27, 30–27, 30–27)	3	5:00	(Note: Young missed weight (128.2 lb).)
Featherweight	Gabriel Braga	def.	Cheyden Leialoha	Decision (unanimous) (29–28, 29–28, 29–28)	3	5:00
Preliminary card (ESPN+)
Women's Flyweight	Jena Bishop	def.	Borena Tsertsvadze	Technical Submission (rear-naked choke)	1	2:21
Welterweight	Omar El Dafrawy	def.	James Vake	KO (punch)	1	1:12
Women's Flyweight	Paulina Wiśniewska	def.	Kana Watanabe	TKO (elbows)	2	3:15
Heavyweight	Alexander Romanov	def.	Rodrigo Nascimento	Submission (guillotine choke)	2	3:10
Lightweight	Biaggio Ali Walsh	def.	Dashiande Harris-Moore	TKO (punches)	1	0:46	(Note: Harris-Moore missed weight (159 lb).)
Welterweight	Valanti Atsas	def.	Nate Jennerman	Decision (unanimous) (29–28, 29–28, 29–28)	3	5:00

== See also ==
- 2026 in Professional Fighters League
- List of PFL events
- List of current PFL fighters
