= Jena Bishop =

American mixed martial artist and Brazilian jiu-jitsu competitor (born 1986)

- Born: Jena Rae Bishop; February 22, 1986 (age 40); St. Charles, Missouri, United States
- Nationality: American
- Height: 5 ft 4 in (1.63 m)
- Weight: 125 lb (57 kg)
- Division: Women's flyweight
- Reach: 66 in (170 cm)
- Style: Brazilian jiu-jitsu
- Fighting out of: San Diego, California, United States
- Team: Alliance Jiu-Jitsu San Diego (2019–present); Gracie Humaitá (2007–2019)
- Rank: Black belt in Brazilian jiu-jitsu
- Years active: 2021–present (MMA)

Mixed martial arts record
- Total: 15
- Wins: 12
- By submission: 7
- By decision: 5
- Losses: 3
- By knockout: 2
- By decision: 1

Other information
- Mixed martial arts record from Sherdog
- Last updated on: October 17, 2026

Jena Rae Bishop (born February 22, 1986) is an American mixed martial artist and Brazilian jiu-jitsu competitor. She currently competes in the Women's Flyweight division of the Professional Fighters League (PFL), where she is the current and inaugural PFL Women's Flyweight World Champion. In grappling she is an eleven-time medalist at IBJJF world championships, winning the No-Gi World Championship at black belt in 2017, both her weight class and the open class at the 2017 World Master Championship, and the World Championship at brown belt in 2013.

Bishop began her professional mixed martial arts career in 2021 and was the runner-up in the 2025 women's flyweight world tournament.

== Background ==
Bishop is from St. Charles, Missouri, outside St. Louis, where she ran track and cross country in high school. She began training Brazilian jiu-jitsu in 2007 after being introduced to the sport by her future husband, Tyler Bishop. JW Wright promoted her through every belt rank, awarding her black belt on July 13, 2013. She moved to San Diego in 2016 and joined Alliance Jiu-Jitsu San Diego in 2019.

== Mixed martial arts career ==
=== Legacy Fighting Alliance ===
During the COVID-19 shutdown of jiu-jitsu competition, Bishop trained with and cornered former UFC title challenger Cat Zingano before transitioning to mixed martial arts, also sparring with Angela Hill. She made her professional debut in 2021, signing with Legacy Fighting Alliance (LFA). She won all four of her LFA bouts, submitting Helen Lucero at LFA 116 in October 2021 and Olivia Beeskau at LFA 145 in October 2022, and taking decisions over Dione Barbosa and Luana Santos.

=== Bellator MMA ===
Bishop signed a multi-fight contract with Bellator MMA in October 2022. She won a unanimous decision over Elina Kallionidou at Bellator 291 in Dublin in February 2023, and submitted Ilara Joanne with a first-round armbar at Bellator 300 in San Diego that October.

=== Professional Fighters League ===
Following the acquisition of Bellator by the PFL, Bishop entered the promotion's 2024 women's flyweight season, submitting Chelsea Hackett in the first round at PFL 1. She lost a split decision to Taila Santos at PFL 4 in June 2024 and was stopped by Dakota Ditcheva in the semifinals at PFL 7 that August.

In the 2025 PFL World Tournament, Bishop won a unanimous decision over Kana Watanabe in April 2025 and submitted Ekaterina Shakalova with a second-round rear-naked choke in the June semifinal in Wichita, Kansas, reaching the final. On August 15, 2025, at PFL 9 in Charlotte, North Carolina, she lost the women's flyweight tournament final to former Bellator champion Liz Carmouche by third-round stoppage.

Bishop was ranked seventh at women's flyweight when the PFL introduced official rankings in January 2026. She submitted Borena Tsertsvadze in the first round at PFL Chicago in April 2026, and submitted former UFC fighter Ariane Lipski da Silva with a first-round armbar at PFL San Diego that June. As of August 2026 the PFL ranked Bishop fourth in its women's flyweight division.

Bishop faced Liz Carmouche in a rematch for the inaugural PFL Women's Flyweight Championship on October 16, 2026, at PFL Chicago 2. She won by unanimous decision with all three cageside judges scoring the fight 48–47.

== Professional grappling career ==
Bishop is an eleven-time medalist across the IBJJF World, World No-Gi and World Master championships. Her major titles include the 2013 World Championship at brown belt, the 2017 World No-Gi Championship at black belt, and double gold at the 2017 World Master Championship.

In 2019 Bishop won the under-60 kg division at the second ADCC North American Trials and competed at the ADCC World Championship, reaching the quarter-finals.

== Fighting style ==
Bishop is a grappler; seven of her eleven professional wins have come by submission.

== Championships and accomplishments ==
=== Mixed martial arts ===
- Professional Fighters League
  - 2025 PFL World Tournament women's flyweight runner-up

=== Brazilian jiu-jitsu ===
Black belt

- IBJJF World No-Gi Championship: 1st place, lightweight (2017); 2nd place (2019); 3rd place (2018)
- IBJJF World Master Championship: 1st place, Master 1 lightweight and open class (2017)
- IBJJF Pan Championship: 1st place, Master 1 lightweight and open class (2017); 2nd place (2018); 3rd place (2014, 2016, 2019)
- IBJJF European Championship: 1st place, Master 1 lightweight and open class (2017)
- IBJJF American National Championship: 1st place, lightweight (2017)
- IBJJF World Championship: 3rd place, lightweight (2016, 2019)
- ADCC North American Trials: 1st place, −60 kg (2019)

Coloured belts

- IBJJF World Championship: 1st place, brown belt lightweight and 3rd place, brown belt open class (2013); 2nd place, purple belt lightweight and 3rd place, purple belt open class (2012)
- IBJJF Pan Championship: 2nd place, brown belt lightweight (2013)

== Mixed martial arts record ==
Professional record breakdown
| 15 matches | 12 wins | 3 losses |
| By knockout | 0 | 2 |
| By submission | 7 | 0 |
| By decision | 5 | 1 |

| Res. | Record | Opponent | Method | Event | Date | Round | Time | Location | Notes |
|---|---|---|---|---|---|---|---|---|---|
| Win | 12–3 | Liz Carmouche | Decision (unanimous) | PFL Chicago: Carmouche vs. Bishop 2 | October 16, 2026 | 5 | 5:00 | Chicago, Illinois, United States | Won the inaugural PFL Women's Flyweight Championship. |
| Win | 11–3 | Ariane Lipski da Silva | Submission (armbar) | PFL San Diego: McKee vs. Isbulaev | June 27, 2026 | 1 | 4:08 | San Diego, California, United States | |
| Win | 10–3 | Borena Tsertsvadze | Technical Submission (rear-naked choke) | PFL Chicago: Pettis vs. McKee | April 11, 2026 | 1 | 2:21 | Chicago, Illinois, United States | |
| Loss | 9–3 | Liz Carmouche | KO (punches) | PFL 9 (2025) | August 15, 2025 | 3 | 2:56 | Charlotte, North Carolina, United States | 2025 PFL Women's Flyweight Tournament Final. |
| Win | 9–2 | Ekaterina Shakalova | Submission (rear-naked choke) | PFL 6 (2025) | June 20, 2025 | 2 | 2:07 | Wichita, Kansas, United States | 2025 PFL Women's Flyweight Tournament Semifinal. |
| Win | 8–2 | Kana Watanabe | Decision (unanimous) | PFL 2 (2025) | April 11, 2025 | 3 | 5:00 | Orlando, Florida, United States | 2025 PFL Women's Flyweight Tournament Quarterfinal. |
| Loss | 7–2 | Dakota Ditcheva | TKO (front kick to the body and punch) | PFL 7 (2024) | August 2, 2024 | 1 | 3:54 | Nashville, Tennessee, United States | 2024 PFL Women's Flyweight Tournament Semifinal. |
| Loss | 7–1 | Taila Santos | Decision (split) | PFL 4 (2024) | June 13, 2024 | 3 | 5:00 | Uncasville, Connecticut, United States | |
| Win | 7–0 | Chelsea Hackett | Submission (armbar) | PFL 1 (2024) | April 4, 2024 | 1 | 4:15 | San Antonio, Texas, United States | |
| Win | 6–0 | Ilara Joanne | Submission (armbar) | Bellator 300 | October 7, 2023 | 1 | 2:45 | San Diego, California, United States | |
| Win | 5–0 | Elina Kallionidou | Decision (unanimous) | Bellator 291 | February 25, 2023 | 3 | 5:00 | Dublin, Ireland | |
| Win | 4–0 | Olivia Beeskau | Submission (rear-naked choke) | LFA 145 | October 21, 2022 | 1 | 2:02 | Oshkosh, Wisconsin, United States | |
| Win | 3–0 | Luana Santos | Decision (split) | LFA 135 | September 3, 2021 | 3 | 5:00 | Phoenix, Arizona, United States | |
| Win | 2–0 | Dione Barbosa | Decision (unanimous) | LFA 118 | November 12, 2021 | 3 | 5:00 | Burbank, California, United States | |
| Win | 1–0 | Helen Lucero | Submission (rear-naked choke) | LFA 116 | October 22, 2021 | 1 | 3:38 | Vail, Colorado, United States | Flyweight debut. |
