= PFL 9 (2025) =

Professional Fighters League MMA event in 2025

- The poster for PFL 9
- Promotion: Professional Fighters League
- Date: August 15, 2025
- Venue: Bojangles Coliseum
- City: Charlotte, North Carolina, United States

Event chronology
| PFL Africa 2 | PFL 9 | PFL 10 |

The PFL 9 mixed martial arts event for the 2025 season of the Professional Fighters League was held on August 15, 2025, at Bojangles Coliseum in Charlotte, North Carolina, United States. This event marked the finals of the single-elimination tournament format in the Lightweight, Bantamweight and Women's Flyweight divisions.

== Background ==
The event marked the promotion's first visit to Charlotte and the state of North Carolina.

The event featured the finals of 2025 PFL World Tournament in the lightweight, bantamweight and women's flyweight divisions.

A featherweight bout between Damion Nelson and Isaiah Diggs was originally scheduled for PFL 8, but the bout was moved to this event for unknown reasons. At the weigh-ins, Nelson weighed in at 149 pounds, 3 pounds over the featherweight limit. The bout proceeded at 150 pounds catchweight and he was fined 20% of his purse, which went to Diggs.

== Results ==
Main card (ESPN / ESPN+)
| Weight class | | | | Method | Round | Time | Notes |
|---|---|---|---|---|---|---|---|
| Lightweight | Alfie Davis | def. | Gadzhi Rabadanov | Decision (unanimous) (48–47, 48–47, 48–47) | 5 | 5:00 | (Note: 2025 PFL Lightweight Tournament Final.) |
| Women's Flyweight | Liz Carmouche | def. | Jena Bishop | KO (punches) | 3 | 2:56 | (Note: 2025 PFL Women's Flyweight Tournament Final.) |
| Bantamweight | Marcirley Alves | def. | Justin Wetzell | Decision (unanimous) (49–46, 48–47, 48–47) | 5 | 5:00 | (Note: 2025 PFL Bantamweight Tournament Final.) |
| Lightweight | Robert Watley | def. | Mads Burnell | TKO (elbows and punches) | 3 | 2:43 |
Preliminary card (ESPN+)
| Women's Flyweight | Juliana Velasquez | def. | Ekaterina Shakalova | Decision (unanimous) (30–27, 29–28, 29–28) | 3 | 5:00 |
| Lightweight | Biaggio Ali Walsh | def. | Adryan Grundy | TKO (punches) | 3 | 3:29 |
| Women's Flyweight | Sabrina de Sousa | def. | Saray Orozco | Decision (unanimous) (30–27, 30–27, 30–27) | 3 | 5:00 |
| Bantamweight | Renat Khavalov | def. | Vilson Ndregjoni | TKO (knee and punches) | 1 | 2:49 |
| Welterweight | Chris Mixan | def. | Kendly St. Louis | TKO (punches) | 1 | 4:36 |
| Catchweight (150 lb) | Damion Nelson | def. | Isaiah Diggs | Decision (split) (29–28, 28–29, 29–28) | 3 | 5:00 |

== Tournament brackets ==
=== 2025 PFL Lightweight Tournament ===
Quarter-finals
(Brazil) Vinicius Sacchelli Cenci (Note: Alexandr Shabliy withdrew from the tournament due to undisclosed reasons and was replaced by Vinicius Sacchelli Cenci.) | 3
(United States) Brent Primus | SUB
(United States) Clay Collard | 3
(England) Alfie Davis | UD
(Russia) Gadzhi Rabadanov | KO
(Democratic Republic of the Congo) Marc Diakiese | 1
(New Zealand) Jay-Jay Wilson | TKO
(Denmark) Mads Burnell | 3

Semi-finals
(United States) Brent Primus | 3
(England) Alfie Davis | UD
(Russia) Gadzhi Rabadanov | TKO
(United States) Kevin Lee (Note: Jay-Jay Wilson withdrew from the tournament due to a jaw injury and was replaced by Kevin Lee.) | 1

Final
(England) Alfie Davis | UD
(Russia) Gadzhi Rabadanov | 5

=== 2025 PFL Bantamweight Tournament ===
Quarter-finals
(Brazil) Leandro Higo | 3
(Brazil) Marcirley Alves (Note: Magomed Magomedov withdrew from the tournament due to injury and was replaced by Josh Rettinghouse. In turn, Rettinghouse was not medically cleared and replaced by Marcirley Alves) | SD
(England) Jake Hadley | SUB
(Brazil) Matheus Mattos (Note: Sarvarjon Khamidov withdrew from the tournament due to visa issues and was replaced by Matheus Mattos.) | 3
(Russia) Kasum Kasumov | 3
(United States) Justin Wetzell (Note: Ciaran Clarke withdrew from the tournament due to injury and was replaced by Justin Wetzell.) | UD
(Italy) Francesco Nuzzi | 1
(Mexico) Mando Gutierrez (Note: Ali Taleb and Zebenzui Ruiz withdrew from the tournament due to visa issues and were replaced by Francesco Nuzzi and Mando Gutierrez.) | SUB

Semi-finals
(Brazil) Marcirley Alves | UD
(England) Jake Hadley | 3
(United States) Justin Wetzell | UD
(Mexico) Mando Gutierrez | 3

Final
(Brazil) Marcirley Alves | UD
(United States) Justin Wetzell | 5

=== 2025 PFL Women's Flyweight Tournament ===
Quarter-finals
(Brazil) Juliana Velasquez | 1
(Ukraine) Ekaterina Shakalova (Note: Taila Santos withdrew from the tournament and was replaced by Ekaterina Shakalova.) | SUB
(Japan) Kana Watanabe | 3
(United States) Jena Bishop | UD
(United States) Liz Carmouche | TKO
(Brazil) Ilara Joanne | 1
(Brazil) Elora Dana | SUB
(Russia) Diana Avsaragova | 1

Semi-finals
(Ukraine) Ekaterina Shakalova | 2
(United States) Jena Bishop | SUB
(United States) Liz Carmouche | UD
(Brazil) Elona Dana | 3

Final
(United States) Jena Bishop | 3
(United States) Liz Carmouche | KO

== See also ==
- List of PFL events
- List of current PFL fighters
