= PFL Dubai: Nurmagomedov vs. Davis =

Professional Fighters League MMA event in 2026

- The poster for PFL Dubai: Nurmagomedov vs. Davis
- Promotion: Professional Fighters League
- Date: February 7, 2026
- Venue: Coca-Cola Arena
- City: Dubai, United Arab Emirates

Event chronology
PFL Africa 4	PFL Dubai: Nurmagomedov vs. Davis	PFL Madrid: van Steenis vs. Edwards 2

PFL Dubai: Nurmagomedov vs. Davis was a mixed martial arts event produced by the Professional Fighters League that took place on February 7, 2026, at Coca-Cola Arena in Dubai, United Arab Emirates.

== Background ==
The event marked the promotion's third visit to Dubai and first since PFL Champions Series 3 in October 2025.

The event was headlined by a PFL Lightweight Championship bout between current champion Usman Nurmagomedov and 2025 PFL Lightweight Tournament winner Alfie Davis.

The co-main event featured an inaugural PFL Welterweight Championship bout between former Bellator Welterweight World Champion Ramazan Kuramagomedov and 2024 PFL Welterweight Tournament winner Shamil Musaev.

A women's flyweight bout between 2024 PFL Women's Flyweight Tournament winner (also a 2023 PFL Europe Women's Flyweight Tournament winner) Dakota Ditcheva and Denise Kielholtz was scheduled for this event. However, the promotion announced that Ditcheva will not be competing due to injury and was replaced by Antonia Silvaneide. At the weigh-ins, Silvaneide weighed in at 127 pounds, one pounds over the flyweight limit and she was fined a percentage of her purse, which went to Kielholtz.

Magomed Umalatov was scheduled to face Abdoul Abdouraguimov in a welterweight bout at this event. However, Umalatov withdrew for unknown reasons and was replaced by Kendly St. Louis.

== Results ==
Main card (ESPN Unlimited / ESPN+)
Weight class				Method	Round	Time	Notes
Lightweight	Usman Nurmagomedov (c)	def.	Alfie Davis	Technical Submission (reverse arm-triangle choke)	3	4:41	(Note: For the PFL Lightweight Championship.)
Welterweight	Ramazan Kuramagomedov	def.	Shamil Musaev	Decision (unanimous) (48–46, 48–46, 48–46)	5	5:00	(Note: For the inaugural PFL Welterweight Championship. Musaev was deducted one point in round 4 due to an illegal knee.)
Welterweight	Abdoul Abdouraguimov	def.	Kendly St. Louis	Decision (split) (30–27, 28–29, 30–27)	3	5:00
Featherweight	Salamat Isbulaev	def.	Jesus Pinedo	TKO (submission to elbows)	1	4:57
Heavyweight	Pouya Rahmani	def.	Karl Williams	Submission (arm-triangle choke)	2	3:41
Preliminary card (ESPN Unlimited / ESPN+)
Lightweight	Amru Magomedov	def.	Kolton Englund	TKO (punches)	1	0:37
Bantamweight	Taylor Lapilus	def.	Kasum Kasumov	TKO (punches)	3	0:47
Bantamweight	Renat Khavalov	def.	Edgars Skrīvers	Decision (unanimous) (30–27, 30–27, 30–27)	3	5:00
Lightweight	Makkasharip Zaynukov	def.	Amin Ayoub	Decision (unanimous) (30–27, 30–27, 29–28)	3	5:00
Women's Flyweight	Denise Kielholtz	def.	Antonia Silvaneide	Decision (unanimous) (29–28, 29–28, 30–27)	3	5:00	(Note: Silvaneide missed weight (127 lb).)
Light Heavyweight	Luke Trainer	def.	Rob Wilkinson	Submission (guillotine choke)	1	3:48
Light Heavyweight	Khabib Nabiev	def.	Ahmed Sami	TKO (punches)	2	2:26
Middleweight	Jhony Gregory	def.	Haider Khan	Submission (guillotine choke)	1	1:18

== See also ==
- 2026 in Professional Fighters League
- List of PFL events
- List of current PFL fighters
