= PFL Tampa: Cyborg vs. Vieira =

Professional Fighters League MMA event in 2026

- The poster for PFL Tampa: Cyborg vs. Vieira
- Promotion: Professional Fighters League
- Date: August 22, 2026
- Venue: Benchmark International Arena
- City: Tampa, Florida, United States

Event chronology
PFL Charlotte: Battle vs. Rosta	PFL Tampa: Cyborg vs. Vieira	PFL MENA 11: Last Man Standing

PFL Tampa: Cyborg vs. Vieira (also known branded as PFL Tampa Presented by Visit St. Pete-Clearwater) was a mixed martial arts event produced by the Professional Fighters League that took place on August 22, 2026, at the Benchmark International Arena in Tampa, Florida, United States.

== Background ==
The event marked the promotion's second visit to Tampa and first since before it was rebranded promotion at WSOF 15 in November 2014.

A PFL Women's Featherweight Championship bout between current champion Cris Cyborg (who is also a former Strikeforce, Invicta FC, UFC and Bellator Women's Featherweight World Champion) and Ketlen Vieira headlined the event. This was Cyborg's retirement fight after beginning a MMA career in 2005, and it also marked Vieira's debut in the promotion after parted ways with the UFC in May 2026. However at the weigh-ins, Vieira weighed in at 152.2 pounds, 7.2 pounds over the featherweight title fight limit and she would be ineligible for the title. As a results, the bout proceeded as a non-title contest.

A lightweight bout between 2024 PFL Lightweight Tournament winner Gadzhi Rabadanov and two-time PFL Europe Lightweight Tournament winner Jakub Kaszuba was scheduled at the co-main event. However, Kaszuba pulled out from the event and was replaced by Tracy Reeder.

2025 PFL Bantamweight Tournament winner Marcirley Alves and Gustavo Oliveira were scheduled to compete at the event, but Oliveira withdrew from the event for unknown reasons and was replaced by 2025 PFL Africa Bantamweight Tournament winner Nkosi Ndebele.

A welterweight bout between 2024 PFL Europe Welterweight Tournament winner Florim Zendeli and Omran Chaaban was removed from the event due to weight-cutting issues for Zendeli.

== Results ==
Main card (ESPN)
Weight class				Method	Round	Time	Notes
Women's Featherweight	Cris Cyborg	def.	Ketlen Vieira	Decision (unanimous) (49–46, 48–47, 49–46)	5	5:00	(Note: Non-title bout; Vieira missed weight (152.2 lb).)
Lightweight	Gadzhi Rabadanov	def.	Tracy Reeder	TKO (punches)	1	4:37
Women's Flyweight	Sabrinna de Sousa	def.	Taila Santos	Decision (unanimous) (29–28, 30–27, 30–27)	3	5:00
Light Heavyweight	Luke Trainer	def.	Roland Dunlap	TKO (front kick and punches)	2	2:22
Preliminary card (ESPN+)
Catchweight (140 lb)	Nkosi Ndebele	def.	Marcirley Alves	Decision (unanimous) (29–28, 30–27, 29–28)	3	5:00
Bantamweight	Daniel Marcos	def.	Magomed Magomedov	TKO (corner stoppage)	3	0:11
Bantamweight	Javid Basharat	def.	Movsar Ibragimov	Decision (unanimous) (29–28, 29–28, 29–28)	3	5:00
Lightweight	Dakota Bush	def.	Morquez Forest	Decision (split) (29-28, 28-29, 29-28)	3	5:00
Lightweight	Natan Schulte	def.	Makkasharip Zaynukov	Decision (unanimous) (30–27, 29–28, 29–28)	3	5:00
Lightweight	Gino van Steenis	def.	Robert Watley	Decision (unanimous) (30–27, 29–28, 29–28)	3	5:00
Welterweight	Eoin Sheridan	def.	James Vake	KO (knee)	1	4:09

== See also ==
- 2026 in Professional Fighters League
- List of PFL events
- List of current PFL fighters
