= PFL MENA 2 (2025) =

Professional Fighters League MMA event in 2025

- The poster for PFL MENA 2
- Promotion: Professional Fighters League
- Date: July 4, 2025
- Venue: The Green Halls
- City: Riyadh, Saudi Arabia

Event chronology
PFL 7	PFL MENA 2	PFL Europe 2

PFL MENA 2: 2025 First Round was a mixed martial arts event produced by the Professional Fighters League that took place on July 4, 2025, at The Green Halls in Riyadh, Saudi Arabia.

== Background ==
The event marked the promotion's second held at The Green Halls and seventh visit to Riyadh, since PFL 10 (2024) in November 2024.

A welterweight bout between 2024 PFL MENA welterweight winner Omar El Dafrawy and Daniele Miceli headlined the event.

The event also featured the quarterfinals of 2025 PFL MENA Tournament in a welterweight and bantamweight divisions.

At the weigh-ins, Mehdi Saadi withdrew from the event due to significantly missing weight. Saadi's opponent Benyamin Ghahraman faced alternate Islam Youssef, but Youssef came in at 137.3 pounds, 1.3 pounds over the bantamweight limit and he was fined a percentage of his purse, which went to Ghahraman. In addition, the amateur bout between Abdulaziz bin Moammar and Hassan Ahmed Moustafa was removed from the event after Moustafa wasn't medically cleared to complete.

== Results ==
Main card (DAZN / StarzPlay)
Weight class				Method	Round	Time	Notes
Welterweight	Omar El Dafrawy	def.	Daniele Miceli	Submission (triangle choke)	1	1:15
Welterweight	Mohammad Alaqraa	def.	Omar Hussein	Decision (unanimous) (30–27, 30–27, 30–27)	3	5:00	(Note: 2025 PFL MENA Welterweight Tournament Quarterfinal.)
Women's Atomweight	Hattan Alsaif	def.	Nour Al Fliti	TKO (leg injury)	2	2:24	(Note: Amateur bout.)
Welterweight	Mohamed Zarey	vs.	Ayman Galal	NC (overturned)	3	5:00	(Note: 2025 PFL MENA Welterweight Tournament Quarterfinal. Originally a unanimous decision (29–28, 29–28, 29–28) win for Zarey, overturned after he tested positive for banned substances.)
Bantamweight	Xavier Alaoui	def.	Ziad Ayman Mokhtar	Decision (unanimous) (30–27, 30–27, 30–27)	3	5:00	(Note: 2025 PFL MENA Bantamweight Tournament Quarterfinal.)
Bantamweight	Moktar Benkaci	def.	Marcel Adur	TKO (submission to punches)	1	0:57	(Note: 2025 PFL MENA Bantamweight Tournament Quarterfinal.)
Preliminary card (DAZN / StarzPlay)
Welterweight	Badreddine Diani	def.	Ahmad Abdelbast Darwish	Decision (unanimous) (29–28, 29–28, 29–28)	3	5:00	(Note: 2025 PFL MENA Welterweight Tournament Quarterfinal.)
Welterweight	Amir Fazli	def.	Rostem Akman	KO (punch)	2	1:34	(Note: 2025 PFL MENA Welterweight Tournament Quarterfinal.)
Bantamweight	Nawras Abzakh	def.	Ali Yazbeck	KO (knee and punches)	2	0:50	(Note: 2025 PFL MENA Bantamweight Tournament Quarterfinal.)
Bantamweight	Islam Youssef	def.	Benyamin Ghahraman	KO (flying head kick)	2	3:55	(Note: 2025 PFL MENA Bantamweight Tournament Quarterfinal; Youssef missed weight (137.3 lb).)
Lightweight	Abdelrahman Alhyasat	vs.	Anthony Zeidan	NC (overturned)	2	2:51	(Note: Originally a Technical Submission (face crank) win for Alhyasat, overturned after he tested positive for banned substances.)

== Tournament brackets ==
=== 2025 PFL MENA Welterweight Tournament ===
Quarter-finals
(Palestine) Omar Hussein	3
(Kuwait) Mohammad Alaqraa	UD
(Iraq) Mohamed Zarey	UD
(Egypt) Ayman Galal	3
(Morocco) Badreddine Diani	UD
(Egypt) Ahmad Abdelbast Darwish	3
(Turkey) Rostem Akman	2
(Iran) Amir Fazli	KO

Semi-finals
(Kuwait) Mohammad Alaqraa
(Iraq) Mohamed Zarey
(Morocco) Badreddine Diani
(Iran) Amir Fazli

Final

=== 2025 PFL MENA Bantamweight Tournament ===
Quarter-finals
(Morocco) Xavier Alaoui	UD
(Egypt) Ziad Ayman Mokhtar	3
(Iran) Benyamin Ghahraman (Note: Elias Boudegzdame withdrew from the tournament and was replaced by Benyamin Ghahraman.)	2
(Egypt) Islam Youssef (Note: Tariq Ismail withdrew from the tournament due to injury and was replaced by Mehdi Saadi. In turn, Saadi withdrew from the event due to significantly missing weight and was replaced by alternate Islam Youssef.)	KO
(Algeria) Moktar Benkaci	TKO
(Lebanon) Marcel Adur	1
(Jordan) Nawras Abzakh	KO
(Lebanon) Ali Yazbeck	2

Semi-finals
(Morocco) Xavier Alaoui
(Egypt) Islam Youssef
(Algeria) Moktar Benkaci
(Jordan) Nawras Abzakh

Final

== See also ==
- 2025 in Professional Fighters League
- List of PFL events
- List of current PFL fighters
