= PFL MENA 4 (2025) =

Professional Fighters League MMA event in 2025

- The poster for PFL MENA 4
- Promotion: Professional Fighters League
- Date: December 5, 2025
- Venue: Dhahran Expo
- City: Khobar, Saudi Arabia

Event chronology
PFL Africa 3	PFL MENA 4	PFL Lyon: Nemkov vs. Ferreira

PFL MENA Finals: All or Nothing was a mixed martial arts event produced by the Professional Fighters League that took place on December 5, 2025, at the Dhahran Expo in Khobar, Saudi Arabia.

== Background ==
The event marked the promotion's first visit to Khobar, which became the third city to hold the PFL events in Saudi Arabia.

The event featured the finals of 2025 PFL MENA Tournament in a welterweight, lightweight, featherweight and bantamweight divisions.

== Results ==
Main card (DAZN / PFL App)
Weight class				Method	Round	Time	Notes
Welterweight	Mohammad Alaqraa	def.	Badreddine Diani	Decision (unanimous) (49–46, 48–47, 48–47)	5	5:00	(Note: 2025 PFL MENA Welterweight Tournament Final.)
Lightweight	Salah Eddine Hamli	def.	Mohammad Fahmi	Submission (brabo choke)	2	4:05	(Note: 2025 PFL MENA Lightweight Tournament Final.)
Featherweight	Islam Reda	def.	Yanis Ghemmouri	Submission (anaconda choke)	2	4:46	(Note: 2025 PFL MENA Featherweight Tournament Final.)
Bantamweight	Nawras Abzakh	def.	Islam Youssef	Technical Submission (guillotine choke)	1	0:36	(Note: 2025 PFL MENA Bantamweight Tournament Final.)
Flyweight	Malik Basahel	def.	Mahmoud Atef	TKO (punches)	1	3:13
Lightweight	Ahmed El Sisy	def.	Abbas Khan	Decision (unanimous) (29–28, 29–28, 30–27)	3	5:00
Welterweight (Amateur)	Ahmed Albrahim	def.	Mohamed Nabil	TKO (punches)	2	2:45
Flyweight	Hamad Marhoon	def.	Oualid Gounaine	Technical Submission (guillotine choke)	1	1:39

== 2025 PFL MENA Tournament ==
=== 2025 PFL MENA Welterweight Tournament ===
Quarter-finals
(Palestine) Omar Hussein	3
(Kuwait) Mohammad Alaqraa	UD
(Iraq) Mohamed Zarey	UD
(Egypt) Ayman Galal	3
(Morocco) Badreddine Diani	UD
(Egypt) Ahmad Abdelbast Darwish	3
(Turkey) Rostem Akman	2
(Iran) Amir Fazli	KO

Semi-finals
(Kuwait) Mohammad Alaqraa	TKO
(Iraq) Mohamed Zarey	1
(Morocco) Badreddine Diani	SD
(Iran) Amir Fazli	3

Final
(Kuwait) Mohammad Alaqraa	UD
(Morocco) Badreddine Diani	3

=== 2025 PFL MENA Lightweight Tournament ===
Quarter-finals
(Iran) Mohsen Mohammadseifi	UD
(Egypt) Ahmed El Sisy	3
(Lebanon) Georges Eid	1
(Iraq) Mohammad Fahmi	SUB
(Morocco) Salah Eddine Hamli	SUB
(Bahrain) Abbas Khan	3
(Kuwait) Abdullah Saleem	TKO
(Algeria) Souhil Taïri	2

Semi-finals
(Iran) Mohsen Mohammadseifi	1
(Iraq) Mohammad Fahmi	SUB
(Morocco) Salah Eddine Hamli	SUB
(Algeria) Souhil Taïri	3

Final
(Iraq) Mohammad Fahmi	2
(Morocco) Salah Eddine Hamli	SUB

=== 2025 PFL MENA Featherweight Tournament ===
Quarter-finals
(Algeria) Akram Nasri (Note: Abdullah Al-Qahtani withdrew from the tournament due to injury and was replaced by Akram Nasri.)	3
(Egypt) Islam Reda	SUB
(Algeria) Drissi Boualem (Note: Abdelrahman Alhyasat withdrew from the tournament due to weight cut issues and was replaced by Drissi Boualem.)	1
(Morocco) Taha Bendaoud	SUB
(Jordan) Izzeddine Al-Derbani	–
(Algeria) Yanis Ghemmouri	BYE (Note: Al Derbani pulled out of the bout due to medical issues and Ghemmouri therefore got a bye to the semi-finals.)
(Iraq) Hussein Salem	3
(Egypt) Assem Ghanem	UD

Semi-finals
(Egypt) Islam Reda	UD
(Morocco) Taha Bendaoud	3
(Algeria) Yanis Ghemmouri	UD
(Egypt) Assem Ghanem	3

Final
(Egypt) Islam Reda	SUB
(Algeria) Yanis Ghemmouri	2

=== 2025 PFL MENA Bantamweight Tournament ===
Quarter-finals
(Morocco) Xavier Alaoui	UD
(Egypt) Ziad Ayman Mokhtar	3
(Iran) Benyamin Ghahraman (Note: Elias Boudegzdame withdrew from the tournament and was replaced by Benyamin Ghahraman.)	2
(Egypt) Islam Youssef (Note: Tariq Ismail withdrew from the tournament due to injury and was replaced by Mehdi Saadi. In turn, Saadi withdrew from the event due to significantly missing weight and was replaced by alternate Islam Youssef.)	KO
(Algeria) Moktar Benkaci	TKO
(Lebanon) Marcel Adur	1
(Jordan) Nawras Abzakh	KO
(Lebanon) Ali Yazbeck	2

Semi-finals
(Morocco) Xavier Alaoui	3
(Egypt) Islam Youssef	UD
(Algeria) Moktar Benkaci	3
(Jordan) Nawras Abzakh	UD

Final
(Egypt) Islam Youssef	1
(Jordan) Nawras Abzakh	SUB

== See also ==
- 2025 in Professional Fighters League
- List of PFL events
- List of current PFL fighters
