= Marcirley Alves =

Brazilian mixed martial arts (MMA) fighter (born 1999)

- Born: Marcirley Alves da Silva; July 22, 1999 (age 27); Eldorado do Carajás, Brazil
- Other names: Durin
- Height: 5 ft 4 in (1.63 m)
- Weight: 135 lb (61 kg; 9 st 9 lb)
- Division: Bantamweight
- Reach: 67 in (170 cm)
- Fighting out of: Bauru, Brazil
- Team: Chute Boxe João Emilio
- Years active: 2017–present

Mixed martial arts record
- Total: 21
- Wins: 15
- By knockout: 10
- By decision: 5
- Losses: 6
- By submission: 2
- By decision: 4

Other information
- Mixed martial arts record from Sherdog

Marcirley Alves da Silva (born July 22, 1999) is a Brazilian mixed martial artist who competes in the bantamweight division of the Professional Fighters League (PFL). In the PFL, he won the 2025 PFL Bantamweight Tournament. A professional since 2017, he previously competed in Bellator MMA. As of April 21, 2026, he is #6 in the PFL bantamweight rankings.

== Professional mixed martial arts career ==
=== Early career ===
Alves started his professional MMA career in 2017 and mainly fought in Brazil, including one bout in the Legacy Fighting Alliance (LFA). He amassed a record of 11–3 prior to being signed by Bellator. During his time in Brazil, he won the Jungle Fight Bantamweight Championship.

=== Bellator MMA ===
Alves was scheduled to face Brett Johns on 12 May 2023 at Bellator 296. However, the week of the event, Johns pulled out due to staph infection.

Alves faced Jerrell Hodge on August 11, 2023, at Bellator 298. He won the fight by knockout via punches in the first round.

Alves faced Sarvarjon Khamidov on June 22, 2024, at Bellator Champions Series 3. He lost the fight by unanimous decision.

=== Professional Fighters League ===
==== 2025 Tournament ====
In the quarterfinal of the 2025 PFL Bantamweight Tournament, Leandro Higo was scheduled to face Magomed Magomedov on April 11, 2025, at PFL 2. However, Magomedov withdrew from the tournament due to injury and was replaced by Josh Rettinghouse. In turn, Rettinghouse was not medically cleared and was replaced by Marcirley Alves. Alves won the fight via split decision.

In the semifinals, Alves faced Jake Hadley on June 20, 2025, at PFL 6. He won the bout via unanimous decision.

In the finals, Alves faced Justin Wetzell on August 15, 2025, at PFL 9. He won the bout by unanimous decision to win the tournament.

==== 2026 ====
Alves faced Naoki Inoue in a crossover fight between PFL and Rizin on May 23, 2026, at PFL Brussels. He lost the fight via split decision.

Alves was scheduled to face Gustavo Oliveira on August 22, 2026, at PFL Tampa. However, Oliveira withdrew from the event for unknown reasons and was replaced by Nkosi Ndebele. Alves lost the bout via unanimous decision.

== Championships and accomplishments ==
- Jungle Fight
  - Jungle Fight Bantamweight Championship (One time)
- Professional Fighters League
  - 2025 PFL Bantamweight Tournament Champion

== Mixed martial arts record ==
Professional record breakdown
21 matches	15 wins	6 losses
By knockout	10	0
By submission	0	2
By decision	5	4

Res.	Record	Opponent	Method	Event	Date	Round	Time	Location	Notes
Loss	15–6	Nkosi Ndebele	Decision (unanimous)	PFL Tampa: Cyborg vs. Vieira	August 22, 2026	3	5:00	Tampa, Florida, United States	Catchweight (140 lb) bout.
Loss	15–5	Naoki Inoue	Decision (split)	PFL Brussels: Habirora vs. Henderson	May 23, 2026	3	5:00	Brussels, Belgium	
Win	15–4	Justin Wetzell	Decision (unanimous)	PFL 9 (2025)	August 15, 2025	5	5:00	Charlotte, North Carolina, United States	Won the 2025 PFL Bantamweight Tournament.
Win	14–4	Jake Hadley	Decision (unanimous)	PFL 6 (2025)	June 20, 2025	3	5:00	Wichita, Kansas, United States	2025 PFL Bantamweight Tournament Semifinal.
Win	13–4	Leandro Higo	Decision (split)	PFL 2 (2025)	April 11, 2025	3	5:00	Orlando, Florida, United States	2025 PFL Bantamweight Tournament Quarterfinal.
Loss	12–4	Sarvarjon Khamidov	Decision (unanimous)	Bellator Champions Series 3	June 22, 2024	3	5:00	Dublin, Ireland	
Win	12–3	Jerrell Hodge	KO (punch)	Bellator 298	August 11, 2023	1	3:53	Sioux Falls, South Dakota, United States	
Win	11–3	Julio Pereira	TKO (punches)	Jungle Fight 113	December 11, 2022	2	3:08	São Paulo, Brazil	Won the Jungle Fight Bantamweight Championship.
Win	10–3	Carlos Soares	TKO	Jungle Fight 111	September 18, 2022	1	1:10	São Paulo, Brazil	
Loss	9–3	Luan Lacerda	Submission (rear-naked choke)	LFA 132	May 13, 2022	2	1:24	Rio de Janeiro, Brazil	
Win	9–2	Daniel Siqueira	KO (punches)	Jungle Fight 106	March 27, 2022	1	3:09	Santa Luzia, Brazil	
Win	8–2	Dôglas Cunha	Decision (unanimous)	Jungle Fight 104	December 28, 2021	4	5:00	São Paulo, Brazil	
Loss	7–2	Diego Paiva	Submission (rear-naked choke)	Road to Future 3	August 1, 2021	2	3:12	Goiânia, Brazil	
Win	7–1	Ronaldo Ferreira	KO (punches)	Jungle Fight 97	October 26, 2019	2		Rio de Janeiro, Brazil	
Win	6–1	Jonatan Rodrigues	KO (punch)	Demolidor Fight 15	July 27, 2019	1	0:55	Bauru, Brazil	
Win	5–1	Pedro Gumont	TKO (retirement)	Gladiadores Fight Combat 2	August 11, 2018	2	5:00	Curionopolis, Brazil	
Win	4–1	Gilvan Lopes	TKO (punches)	Cricuito Araguaia de MMA 12	July 22, 2018	1	4:12	Conceição do Araguaia, Brazil	
Win	3–1	Arleson Iau	TKO (punches)	Pit Bull Super Fight 5	April 28, 2018	1	3:00	Salinópolis, Brazil	
Loss	2–1	Mateus Glória	Decision (unanimous)	L.A. Combate MMA 2	April 28, 2018	3	5:00	Rio Maria, Brazil	
Win	2–0	Jadson Souza	TKO (punches)	Dragon Fighters 13	December 9, 2017	1	2:26	Ourilândia do Norte, Brazil	
Win	1–0	Arleson Iau	TKO (punches)	Pit Bull Super Fight 4	September 16, 2017	3	5:00	Salinópolis, Brazil	
