= PFL Africa 4 (2025) =

Professional Fighters League MMA event in 2025

- The poster for PFL Africa 4
- Promotion: Professional Fighters League
- Date: December 20, 2025
- Venue: Sofitel Dome
- City: Cotonou, Benin

Event chronology
PFL Lyon: Nemkov vs. Ferreira	PFL Africa 4	PFL Dubai: Nurmagomedov vs. Davis

2025 PFL Africa Finals: Benin was a mixed martial arts event produced by the Professional Fighters League that took place on December 20, 2025, at the Sofitel Dome in Cotonou, Benin.

== Background ==
This event marked the promotion's debut in Benin, which became the third country in the Africa region (after South Africa and Rwanda).

The event featured the finals of 2025 PFL Africa Tournament in a heavyweight, welterweight, featherweight and bantamweight divisions.

At the fight week, Karim Henniène withdrew from the event against Nkosi Ndebele due to an injury and was replaced by Boule Godogo.

== Results ==
Main card (Vice TV / PFL App)
Weight class				Method	Round	Time	Notes
Bantamweight	Nkosi Ndebele	def.	Boule Godogo	TKO (submission to body kick)	2	0:27	(Note: 2025 PFL Africa Bantamweight Tournament Final.)
Welterweight	Yabna N'Tchalá	def.	Shido Boris Esperança	TKO (retirement)	2	5:00	(Note: 2025 PFL Africa Welterweight Tournament Final.)
Lightweight	Cornel Thompson	def.	Jean Do Santos	Decision (unanimous) (30–27, 30–27, 29–28)	3	5:00
Heavyweight	Abraham Bably	def.	Justin Clarke	KO (punches)	1	0:21	(Note: 2025 PFL Africa Heavyweight Tournament Final.)
Featherweight	Wasi Adeshina	def.	Alain Majorique	TKO (doctor stoppage)	2	3:07	(Note: 2025 PFL Africa Featherweight Tournament Final.)
Preliminary card (Vice TV / PFL App)
Welterweight	Eliezer Kubanza	def.	Francois Mozou Ahizi	TKO (punches)	1	3:18
Women's Strawweight	Juliet Ukah	def.	Maryam Gaber	TKO (punches)	1	3:12
Light Heavyweight	Styve Ngono Essono	def.	Mélèdje Yedoh	Decision (unanimous) (30–27, 30–27, 30–27)	3	5:00
Heavyweight	Abdoullah Kane	def.	Jashell Ticha Awa	TKO (punches)	2	2:54
Welterweight	Mouhamed Ba	vs.	Desmond Awa Tamungang	NC (overturned)	1	2:00	(Note: Originally a TKO (punches) win for Ba; overturned after he tested positive for banned substance.)
Women's Strawweight	Shelda Chipito	def.	Miracle Andrew	Decision (unanimous) (30–27, 30–27, 30–27)	3	5:00

== 2025 PFL Africa Tournament ==
=== 2025 PFL Africa Heavyweight Tournament ===
Quarter-finals
(Ivory Coast) Paul-Emmanuel Gnaze (Note: Badr Medkouri withdrew from the tournament and was replaced by Paul-Emmanuel Gnaze.)	1
(Ivory Coast) Abraham Bably	KO
(Nigeria) Joffie Houlton (Note: Mohammad Ben Yahia withdrew from the tournament due to an injury and was replaced by Joffie Houlton.)	DQ
(Senegal) Abdoullah Kane	1
(South Africa) Justin Clarke	TKO
(Cameroon) Jashell Ticha Awa	1
(Cameroon) Maxwell Djantou Nana	UD
(Ivory Coast) Mickaël Groguhe	3

Semi-finals
(Ivory Coast) Abraham Bably	TKO
(Nigeria) Joffie Houlton	1
(Cameroon) Maxwell Djantou Nana	3
(South Africa) Justin Clarke	TKO

Final
(Ivory Coast) Abraham Bably	KO
(South Africa) Justin Clarke	1

=== 2025 PFL Africa Welterweight Tournament ===
Quarter-finals
(Angola) Shido Boris Esperanca	SUB
(The Gambia) Ibrahima Mané	1
(Democratic Republic of the Congo) British Boloyoang	1
(Cameroon) Ayinda Octave	TKO
(Burkina Faso) Sanon Sadeck	3
(Guinea-Bissau) Yabna N'Tchalá	UD
(Angola) Osvaldo Benedito	1
(Cameroon) Emilios Dassi	KO

Semi-finals
(Angola) Shido Boris Esperanca	SUB
(Cameroon) Ayinda Octave	1
(Guinea-Bissau) Yabna N'Tchalá	UD
(Cameroon) Emilios Dassi	3

Final
(Angola) Shido Boris Esperanca	2
(Guinea-Bissau) Yabna N'Tchalá	TKO

=== 2025 PFL Africa Featherweight Tournament ===
Quarter-finals
(Nigeria) Patrick Ocheme	DEC
(Guinea) Mohamed Camara	3
(Burkina Faso) Abdul Razak Sankara	KO
(Democratic Republic of the Congo) Shadrick Dju Yemba (Note: The bout was originally scheduled as Abderrahman Errachidy vs. Elbert Lukas Steyn, but both fighters missed weight and were replaced by alternate bout between Abdul Razak Sankara vs. Shadrick Dju Yemba.)	1
(Nigeria) Wasi Adeshina	SUB
(Democratic Republic of the Congo) Jean-Jacques Lubaya	2
(Angola) Wilker Nsamo	2
(Liberia) Dwight Joseph	KO

Semi-finals
(Guinea) Mohamed Camara	3
(Cameroon) Alain Majorique (Note: The bout was originally scheduled as Patrick Ocheme vs. Abdul Razak Sankara, but both fighters missed weight and were replaced by alternate bout between Mohamed Camara vs. Alain Majorique.)	UD
(Nigeria) Wasi Adeshina	UD
(Liberia) Dwight Joseph	3

Final
(Cameroon) Alain Majorique	2
(Nigeria) Wasi Adeshina	TKO

=== 2025 PFL Africa Bantamweight Tournament ===
Quarter-finals
(South Africa) Nkosi Ndebele	TKO
(Egypt) Mahmoud Atef	1
(South Africa) Frans Mlambo (Note: Alain Majorique withdrew from the tournament and was replaced by Frans Mlambo.)	3
(Zimbabwe) Simbarashe Hokonya	UD
(South Africa) Shannon van Tonder	3
(Angola) Boule Godogo	SD
(South Africa) Asiashu Tshitamba (Note: Antero dos Santos withdrew from the tournament and was replaced by Asiashu Tshitamba.)	3
(Algeria) Karim Henniene	SD

Semi-finals
(South Africa) Nkosi Ndebele	SD
(Zimbabwe) Simbarashe Hokonya	3
(Angola) Boule Godogo	3
(Algeria) Karim Henniene	KO

Final
(South Africa) Nkosi Ndebele	TKO
(Angola) Boule Godogo (Note: Karim Henniene withdrew from the tournament and was replaced by Boule Godogo.)	2

== See also ==
- 2025 in Professional Fighters League
- List of PFL events
- List of current PFL fighters
