= PFL 7 (2025) =

Professional Fighters League MMA event in 2025

- The poster for PFL 7
- Promotion: Professional Fighters League
- Date: June 27, 2025
- Venue: Wintrust Arena
- City: Chicago, Illinois, United States

Event chronology
PFL 6	PFL 7	PFL MENA 2

The PFL 7 mixed martial arts event for the 2025 season of the Professional Fighters League was held on June 27, 2025, at the Wintrust Arena in Chicago, Illinois, United States. This event marked the semifinals of the single-elimination tournament format in the Heavyweight, Light Heavyweight and Middleweight divisions.

== Background ==
The event marked the promotion's third visit to Chicago and first since PFL 3 (2024) in April 2024.

The event featured the semifinals of 2025 PFL World Tournament in a middleweight, light heavyweight and heavyweight divisions.

A bantamweight bout between former Bellator Bantamweight World Champion Sergio Pettis and former interim champion Raufeon Stots took place at this event. The pairing was previously scheduled to meet for the bantamweight title and the Grand Prix at Bellator 279 in April 2022, but Pettis was forced to pull out due to sustaining an injury that required surgery.

== Results ==
Main card (ESPN / ESPN+)
Weight class				Method	Round	Time	Notes
Middleweight	Fabian Edwards	def.	Josh Silveira	Decision (unanimous) (29–28, 29–28, 29–28)	3	5:00	(Note: 2025 PFL Middleweight Tournament Semifinal.)
Light Heavyweight	Sullivan Cauley	def.	Phil Davis	Decision (unanimous) (30–27, 30–27, 29–28)	3	5:00	(Note: 2025 PFL Light Heavyweight Tournament Semifinal.)
Bantamweight	Sergio Pettis	def.	Raufeon Stots	Decision (unanimous) (29–28, 29–28, 29–28)	3	5:00
Middleweight	Dalton Rosta	def.	Aaron Jeffrey	Decision (split) (29–28, 27–30, 29–28)	3	5:00	(Note: 2025 PFL Middleweight Tournament Semifinal.)
Light Heavyweight	Antônio Carlos Júnior	def.	Simeon Powell	Decision (unanimous) (29–28, 29–28, 29–28)	3	5:00	(Note: 2025 PFL Light Heavyweight Tournament Semifinal.)
Preliminary card (ESPN+)
Heavyweight	Valentin Moldavsky	vs.	Alexander Romanov	No Contest (accidental groin strike)	1	4:26	(Note: 2025 PFL Heavyweight Tournament Semifinal. An accidental groin strike rendered Romanov unable to continue; the judges picked him to advance to the finals.)
Lightweight	Ronnie Gibbs	def.	Biaggio Ali Walsh	Technical Submission (arm-triangle choke)	2	2:45
Heavyweight	Oleg Popov	def.	Rodrigo Nascimento	Decision (unanimous) (30–27, 30–27, 30–27)	3	5:00	(Note: 2025 PFL Heavyweight Tournament Semifinal.)
Light Heavyweight	Rafael Xavier	def.	Karl Albrektsson	TKO (punches)	1	0:27	(Note: 2025 PFL Light Heavyweight Tournament Alternate bout.)

== Tournament brackets ==
=== 2025 PFL Heavyweight Tournament ===
Quarter-finals
(Russia) Valentin Moldavsky	UD
(Russia) Sergey Bilostenniy	3
(Moldova) Alexander Romanov	SUB
(United States) Timothy Johnson	1
(England) Abraham Bably	3
(Brazil) Rodrigo Nascimento (Note: Pouya Rahmani withdrew from the tournament due to visa issues and was replaced by Rodrigo Nascimento.)	SD
(Russia) Oleg Popov	SD
(United States Virgin Islands) Karl Williams (Note: Linton Vassell withdrew from the tournament and was replaced by Karl Williams.)	3

Semi-finals
(Russia) Valentin Moldavsky	1
(Moldova) Alexander Romanov	NC
(Brazil) Rodrigo Nascimento	3
(Russia) Oleg Popov	UD

Final
(Moldova) Alexander Romanov
(Russia) Oleg Popov

=== 2025 PFL Light Heavyweight Tournament ===
Quarter-finals
(United States) Phil Davis	TKO
(Australia) Rob Wilkinson	2
(United States) Alex Polizzi (Note: Marcelo Nunes withdrew from the tournament before event started and was replaced by Alex Polizzi.)	1
(United States) Sullivan Cauley	TKO
(Republic of Ireland) Karl Moore	3
(Brazil) Antônio Carlos Júnior	SD
(Sweden) Karl Albrektsson	2
(England) Simeon Powell	TKO

Semi-finals
(United States) Phil Davis	3
(United States) Sullivan Cauley	UD
(Brazil) Antônio Carlos Júnior	UD
(England) Simeon Powell	3

Final
(United States) Sullivan Cauley
(Brazil) Antônio Carlos Júnior

=== 2025 PFL Middleweight Tournament ===
Quarter-finals
(United States) Impa Kasanganay	1
(England) Fabian Edwards	TKO
(England) Mike Shipman	3
(United States) Josh Silveira	UD
(United States) Dalton Rosta	SUB
(Sweden) Sadibou Sy	2
(Canada) Aaron Jeffery	SD
(Russia) Murad Ramazanov	3

Semi-finals
(England) Fabian Edwards	UD
(United States) Josh Silveira	3
(United States) Dalton Rosta	SD
(Canada) Aaron Jeffery	3

Final
(England) Fabian Edwards
(United States) Dalton Rosta

== See also ==
- 2025 in Professional Fighters League
- List of PFL events
- List of current PFL fighters
