= PFL 6 (2025) =

Professional Fighters League MMA event in 2025

- The poster for PFL 6
- Promotion: Professional Fighters League
- Date: June 20, 2025
- Venue: Intrust Bank Arena
- City: Wichita, Kansas, United States

Event chronology
PFL 5	PFL 6	PFL 7

The PFL 6 mixed martial arts event for the 2025 season of the Professional Fighters League was held on June 20, 2025, at Intrust Bank Arena in Wichita, Kansas, United States. This event marked the semifinals of the single-elimination tournament format in the Lightweight, Bantamweight and Women's Flyweight divisions.

== Background ==
The event marked the promotion's debut in Wichita and the state of Kansas.

The event featured the semifinals of 2025 PFL World Tournament in a women's flyweight, bantamweight and lightweight divisions.

Jay-Jay Wilson was scheduled to face 2024 PFL lightweight winner Gadzhi Rabadanov in a lightweight semifinal bout at the main event. However, Wilson withdrew from the bout due to suffering a broken jaw. On May 28, the promotion announced that Kevin Lee signed with PFL and replaced Wilson against Rabadanov instead.

== Results ==
Main card (ESPN / ESPN+)
Weight class				Method	Round	Time	Notes
Lightweight	Gadzhi Rabadanov	def.	Kevin Lee	TKO (punches)	1	2:37	(Note: 2025 PFL Lightweight Tournament Semifinal.)
Women's Flyweight	Liz Carmouche	def.	Elora Dana	Decision (unanimous) (30–27, 30–27, 30–27)	3	5:00	(Note: 2025 PFL Women's Flyweight Tournament Semifinal.)
Lightweight	Archie Colgan	def.	Mansour Barnaoui	Decision (unanimous) (29–28, 29–28, 29–28)	3	5:00	(Note: Bellator Lightweight title eliminator.)
Bantamweight	Marcirley Alves	def.	Jake Hadley	Decision (unanimous) (30–27, 30–27, 30–27)	3	5:00	(Note: 2025 PFL Bantamweight Tournament Semifinal.)
Lightweight	Alfie Davis	def.	Brent Primus	Decision (unanimous) (29–28, 29–28, 29–28)	3	5:00	(Note: 2025 PFL Lightweight Tournament Semifinal.)
Bantamweight	Justin Wetzell	def.	Mando Gutierrez	Decision (unanimous) (30–27, 30–27, 30–27)	3	5:00	(Note: 2025 PFL Bantamweight Tournament Semifinal.)
Preliminary card (ESPN+)
Women's Flyweight	Jena Bishop	def.	Ekaterina Shakalova	Submission (rear-naked choke)	2	2:07	(Note: 2025 PFL Women's Flyweight Tournament Semifinal.)
Bantamweight	Magomed Magomedov	def.	Sarvarjon Khamidov	Decision (unanimous) (29–28, 29–28, 29–28)	3	5:00	(Note: 2025 PFL Bantamweight Tournament Alternate bout.)
Lightweight	Vinicius Sacchelli Cenci	def.	Antonio Caruso	Submission (triangle choke)	1	1:43
Lightweight	Darragh Kelly	def.	Mike Hamel	Submission (face crank)	3	3:09
Women's Flyweight	Ilra Joanne	def.	Saray Orozco	Decision (unanimous) (30–27, 30–27, 29–28)	3	5:00
Welterweight	Nick Meck	def.	Alan Domínguez	Submission (rear-naked choke)	1	4:10

== Tournament brackets ==
=== 2025 PFL Lightweight Tournament ===
Quarter-finals
(Brazil) Vinicius Sacchelli Cenci (Note: Alexandr Shabliy withdrew from the tournament due to undisclosed reasons and was replaced by Vinicius Sacchelli Cenci.)	3
(United States) Brent Primus	SUB
(United States) Clay Collard	3
(England) Alfie Davis	UD
(Russia) Gadzhi Rabadanov	KO
(Democratic Republic of the Congo) Marc Diakiese	1
(New Zealand) Jay-Jay Wilson	TKO
(Denmark) Mads Burnell	3

Semi-finals
(United States) Brent Primus	3
(England) Alfie Davis	UD
(Russia) Gadzhi Rabadanov	TKO
(United States) Kevin Lee (Note: Jay-Jay Wilson withdrew from the tournament due to injury and was replaced by Kevin Lee.)	1

Final
(England) Alfie Davis
(Russia) Gadzhi Rabadanov

=== 2025 PFL Bantamweight Tournament ===
Quarter-finals
(Brazil) Leandro Higo	3
(Brazil) Marcirley Alves (Note: Magomed Magomedov withdrew from the tournament due to injury and was replaced by Josh Rettinghouse. In turn, Rettinghouse was not medically cleared and replaced by Marcirley Alves)	SD
(England) Jake Hadley	SUB
(Brazil) Matheus Mattos (Note: Sarvarjon Khamidov withdrew from the tournament due to visa issues and was replaced by Matheus Mattos.)	3
(Russia) Kasum Kasumov	3
(United States) Justin Wetzell (Note: Ciaran Clarke withdrew from the tournament due to injury and was replaced by Justin Wetzell.)	UD
(Italy) Francesco Nuzzi	1
(Mexico) Mando Gutierrez (Note: Ali Taleb and Zebenzui Ruiz withdrew from the tournament due to visa issues and were replaced by Francesco Nuzzi and Mando Gutierrez.)	SUB

Semi-finals
(Brazil) Marcirley Alves	UD
(England) Jake Hadley	3
(United States) Justin Wetzell	UD
(Mexico) Mando Gutierrez	3

Final
(Brazil) Marcirley Alves
(United States) Justin Wetzell

=== 2025 PFL Women's Flyweight Tournament ===
Quarter-finals
(Brazil) Juliana Velasquez	1
(Ukraine) Ekaterina Shakalova (Note: Taila Santos withdrew from the tournament and was replaced by Ekaterina Shakalova.)	SUB
(Japan) Kana Watanabe	3
(United States) Jena Bishop	UD
(United States) Liz Carmouche	TKO
(Brazil) Ilara Joanne	1
(Brazil) Elora Dana	SUB
(Russia) Diana Avsaragova	1

Semi-finals
(Ukraine) Ekaterina Shakalova	2
(United States) Jena Bishop	SUB
(United States) Liz Carmouche	UD
(Brazil) Elona Dana	3

Final
(United States) Jena Bishop
(United States) Liz Carmouche

== See also ==
- 2025 in Professional Fighters League
- List of PFL events
- List of current PFL fighters
