= PFL Africa 2 (2025) =

Professional Fighters League MMA event in 2025

- The poster for PFL Africa 2
- Promotion: Professional Fighters League
- Date: August 9, 2025
- Venue: Big Top Arena
- City: Johannesburg, South Africa

Event chronology
PFL 8	PFL Africa 2	PFL 9

PFL Africa 2 was a mixed martial arts event produced by the Professional Fighters League that took place on August 9, 2025, at Big Top Arena in Johannesburg, South Africa.

== Background ==
The event marked the promotion's first visit to Johannesburg.

The event featured the quarterfinals of 2025 PFL Africa Tournament in a welterweight and featherweight divisions.

At the weigh-ins, the quarterfinal bout between Abderrahman Errachidy and Elbert Lukas Steyn missed weight when both fighters weighed in at 148 pounds, 2 pounds over the featherweight limit and the bout proceeded to catchweight bout. Therefore, alternate bout between Abdul Razac Sankara and Shadrick Dju Yemba was promoted to quarterfinal bout instead.

== Results ==
Main card (DAZN / PFL App)
Weight class				Method	Round	Time	Notes
Featherweight	Patrick Ocheme	def.	Mohamed Camara	Decision (unanimous) (30–27, 30–27, 29–28)	3	5:00	(Note: 2025 PFL Africa Featherweight Tournament Quarterfinal.)
Welterweight	Shido Boris Esperanca	def.	Ibrahima Mané	Submission (rear-naked choke)	1	0:34	(Note: 2025 PFL Africa Welterweight Tournament Quarterfinal.)
Welterweight	Ayinda Octave	def.	British Boloyoang	TKO (retirement)	1	1:55	(Note: 2025 PFL Africa Welterweight Tournament Quarterfinal.)
Welterweight	Yabna N'Tchalá	def.	Sanon Sadeck	Decision (unanimous) (29–28, 29–28, 30–27)	3	5:00	(Note: 2025 PFL Africa Welterweight Tournament Quarterfinal.)
Welterweight	Emilios Dassi	def.	Osvaldo Benedito	KO (punches)	1	2:12	(Note: 2025 PFL Africa Welterweight Tournament Quarterfinal.)
Preliminary card (DAZN / PFL App)
Featherweight	Wasi Adeshina	def.	Jean-Jacques Lubaya	Submission (rear-naked choke)	2	3:14	(Note: 2025 PFL Africa Featherweight Tournament Quarterfinal.)
Featherweight	Dwight Joseph	def.	Wilker Nsamo	KO (flying knee)	2	4:57	(Note: 2025 PFL Africa Featherweight Tournament Quarterfinal.)
Catchweight (148 lb)	Abderrahman Errachidy	def.	Elbert Lukas Steyn	TKO (knee to the body and punches)	2	0:14
Featherweight	Abdul Razac Sankara	def.	Shadrick Dju Yemba	KO (head kick)	1	2:01	(Note: 2025 PFL Africa Featherweight Tournament Quarterfinal.)
Welterweight	Kunle Lawal	def.	Desmond Awa Tamungang	Decision (unanimous) (29–28, 29–28, 29–28)	3	5:00	(Note: 2025 PFL Africa Welterweight Tournament Alternate bout.)

== Tournament brackets ==
=== 2025 PFL Africa Welterweight Tournament ===
Quarter-finals
(Angola) Shido Boris Esperanca	SUB
(The Gambia) Ibrahima Mané	1
(Democratic Republic of the Congo) British Boloyoang	1
(Cameroon) Ayinda Octave	TKO
(Burkina Faso) Sanon Sadeck	3
(Guinea-Bissau) Yabna N'Tchalá	UD
(Angola) Osvaldo Benedito	1
(Cameroon) Emilios Dassi	KO

Semi-finals
(Angola) Shido Boris Esperanca
(Cameroon) Ayinda Octave
(Guinea-Bissau) Yabna N'Tchalá
(Cameroon) Emilios Dassi

Final

=== 2025 PFL Africa Featherweight Tournament ===
Quarter-finals
(Nigeria) Patrick Ocheme	DEC
(Guinea) Mohamed Camara	3
(Burkina Faso) Abdul Razac Sankara	KO
(Democratic Republic of the Congo) Shadrick Dju Yemba (Note: The bout was originally scheduled as Abderrahman Errachidy vs. Elbert Lukas Steyn, but both fighters missed weight and were replaced by alternate bout between Abdul Razac Sankara vs. Shadrick Dju Yemba.)	1
(Nigeria) Wasi Adeshina	SUB
(Democratic Republic of the Congo) Jean-Jacques Lubaya	2
(Angola) Wilker Nsamo	2
(Liberia) Dwight Joseph	KO

Semi-finals
(Nigeria) Patrick Ocheme
(Burkina Faso) Abdul Razac Sankara
(Nigeria) Wasi Adeshina
(Liberia) Dwight Joseph

Final

== See also ==
- 2025 in Professional Fighters League
- List of PFL events
- List of current PFL fighters
