= PFL 8 =

PFL 8 may refer to the following events from the Professional Fighters League:

- PFL 8 (2018)
- PFL 8 (2019)
- PFL 8 (2021)
- PFL 8 (2022)
- PFL 8 (2023)
- PFL 8 (2024)
- PFL 8 (2025)

== See also ==
- PFL (disambiguation)
