= Gadzhi Rabadanov =

Russian mixed martial arts fighter

- Born: July 1, 1993 (age 33); Makhachkala, Dagestan, Russia
- Height: 5 ft 9 in (1.75 m)
- Weight: 155 lb (70 kg; 11 st 1 lb)
- Division: Lightweight
- Reach: 72 in (183 cm)
- Style: Combat Sambo
- Stance: Southpaw
- Fighting out of: Makhachkala, Dagestan, Russia; San Jose, California, U.S.
- Team: American Kickboxing Academy; Eagles MMA; Mamishev Team
- Trainer: Abdulmanap Nurmagomedov; Javier Mendez
- Rank: International Master of Sport in Amateur MMA
- Years active: 2013–present

Mixed martial arts record
- Total: 34
- Wins: 28
- By knockout: 11
- By submission: 5
- By decision: 12
- Losses: 5
- By knockout: 2
- By submission: 1
- By decision: 2
- Draws: 1

Other information
- Mixed martial arts record from Sherdog

Gadzhi Kadiomarovich Rabadanov (Russian: Гаджи Кадиомарович Рабаданов, born July 1, 1993) is a Russian mixed martial artist, currently fighting in the Lightweight division of the PFL, where he was the 2024 PFL Lightweight Champion. A professional mixed martial artist since 2013, He has previously competed in Bellator MMA, Fight Nights Global (FNG), and GFC, where he was the promotion's Lightweight Champion. As of February 12, 2026, he is #2 in the PFL lightweight rankings.

He is also an WWMMA world champion, winning a gold medal in the -74 kg category in 2015, in Prague. As result Rabadanov was given International Master of Sports in mixed martial arts (MMA) for his achievements in Prague. He is also a WCSF World Combat Sambo Championship bronze medalist in 2014.

Rabadanov set a record for the fastest finish in amateur MMA history, when which he submitted his opponent in 17 seconds, in 2015.

== Early life ==
Rabadanov was born in the city of Makhachkala, in the Republic of Dagestan, Russia, on January 1, 1993, of Dargin ethnicity. He currently resides in Chelyabinsk. In his childhood, he played football and was passionate about freestyle wrestling. Rabadanov eventually switched to combat sambo at the age of 17 years old, where he came under the tutelage of Abdulmanap Nurmagomedov.

Following his graduation from high school, he combined his combat sambo training and study at the Russian Legal Academy. Rabadanov gave martial arts (Combat Sambo and MMA) his whole attention after his third year of college and began competing professionally in MMA. Ever since then he started doing professional MMA and grappling. He obtained a legal degree after graduating from the academy with honors. He is an amateur MMA champion of Russia in 2015.

== Mixed martial arts career ==
=== Early career ===
In February 2013, Rabadanov made his professional MMA debut at the Octagon MMA Warriors 13 event, defeating fellow newbie Evgeniy Sokha with a kimura in the second round. He competed seven more times across local MMA promotions in Russia.

WMMAA Lightweight Champion

Rabadanov had a notable run at WMMAA World Championship at Prague, where he defeated current UFC fighters like Ľudovít Klein and Loik Radzhabov to become WMMAA Lightweight champion. It was in this tournament, where he became record holder for the fastest finish in amateur MMA history, with the record of defeating his opponent in 17 seconds in the very first round of the fight.

Return to Professional MMA

Rabadanov didn't actually compete for a major MMA organization until 2016, when he went into the Fight Nights Global promotion, for whom he successfully competed in six of their events.

Rabadanov also competed for notable MMA promotion, PFL on May 23, 2019, when he was pitted against former UFC fighter Steven "Super" Siler, which the Dagestani won via unanimous decision. He was unable to establish himself as regular fixture in PFL due to issues with weight cutting, so he opted to return to his homeland and resumed his career with the Russian MMA promotion Gorilla FC.

On February 9, 2020, Rabadanov and the Brazilian fighter, Joao Paulo de Moura e Silva were given the chance to compete for Gorilla Fighting Championships lightweight belt, after the original bout between Nurullo Aliev and Anvar Chergesov (original competitors for lightweight belt) was cancelled, at GFC 24 event, in which the Dagestani won the belt by defeating Brazilian via unanimous decision.

=== Eagle Fighting Championship ===
The Gorilla Fighting Championship was than bought by MMA superstar Khabib Nurmagomedov for a price of one million dollar, and then rebranded as Eagle Fighting Championship. Rabadanov who remained lightweight champion under the new organization, was booked to defend his title against French fighter of Chechen origin Mehdi Dakaev, at EFC 30, on December 4, 2020. Dakaev won the fight against Rabadanov via unanimous decision and ultimately becoming the new lightweight champion.

In Rabadanov second fight for Eagle Fighting Championship, he was booked against Russian compatriot Valery Gritsutin (who was on a 6 fight winning streak), at EFC 33 event, which he won by unanimous decision. After this fight, Rabadanov went on to sign for the US-based promotion Bellator MMA.

=== Bellator MMA ===
Rabadanov was set to make his debut for Bellator MMA against Daniel Carey, at Bellator 263 - Pitbull vs. McKee, on July 31, 2021. He KO'd the American fighter with a punch in round one of the fight.

In Rabadanov second bout for Bellator MMA, he booked to face against the Maori fighter Jay-Jay Wilson, at Bellator 276 - Borics vs. Burnell, on March 12, 2022. He defeated New Zealander via unanimous decision.

Four months later on July 22, Rabadanov was booked to face the Hawaiian fighter Bobby King, at Bellator 283 - Lima vs. Jackson event. He won the fight via unanimous decision.

In December of the same year, Rabadanov participated in a special event in co-promotion between Bellator MMA and Japan-based promotion Rizin Fighting Federation called Bellator MMA vs Rizin where he set to face off against Japanese BJJ specialist by the name of Koji Takeda. He won the fight against Takeda via unanimous decision.

In Rabadanov fifth fight for Bellator, he was booked in a bout against the Dutch adversary Pieter Buist, at Bellator 297 - Nemkov vs. Romero event, on June 16, 2023. The Dagestani defeated the Dutchman via unanimous decision on judges scorecard.

=== 2024 ===
Rabadanov started the 2024 season with a bout against Solomon Renfro on April 12, 2024, at PFL 2. He won the fight by unanimous decision.

His second fight for 2024 season was booked against unbeaten Nicaraguan prospect, Elvin "The Prodigy" Espinoza on June 21, 2024, on the prelims of PFL 5 - Collard vs. Burnell card, at Jon M. Huntsman Center stadium, Salt Lake City, Utah. Rabadanov won the fight via (30–27) unanimous decision on all three judges scorecard. With this the Nicaraguan fighter suffered the first loss of his pro fight career.

Rabadanov faced Michael Dufort in the semifinals of the 2024 Lightweight tournament on August 16, 2024, at PFL 8. He won the fight by knockout in the second round.

In the final, Rabadanov faced Brent Primus on November 29, 2024, at PFL 10. He won the tournament including the $1 million prize by knockout in the third round.

==== 2025 ====
On February 26, 2025, the promotion officially revealed that Rabadanov joined the 2025 PFL Lightweight Tournament.

In the quarterfinal, Rabadanov faced Marc Diakiese on April 18, 2025, at PFL 3. He won the fight via knockout in round one.

In the semifinals, Rabadanov was scheduled to face Jay-Jay Wilson on June 20, 2025, at PFL 6. However, Wilson withdrew and was replaced by Kevin Lee. Rabadanov won the fight via TKO in the first round.

In the final, Rabadanov faced Alfie Davis on August 15, 2025, at PFL 9. He lost the bout by unanimous decision.

==== 2026 ====
Rabadanov faced Alexandr Chizov on May 2, 2026, at PFL Sioux Falls. He won the fight via unanimous decision.

Rabadanov was scheduled to face Jakub Kaszuba on August 22, 2026, at PFL Tampa. However, Kaszuba pulled out from the event and was replaced by Tracy Reeder. Rabadanov won the bout via TKO in the first round.

== Championships and accomplishments ==
=== Sambo ===
- Russian Combat Sambo Federation (RCSF)
  - (gold) Russian Professional Combat Sambo Championship-Samara, Russia (2014) at 74 kg
- World Combat Sambo Federation (WCSF)
  - (bronze) World Combat Sambo Championship-Moscow, Russia (2014) at 74 kg

=== Amateur mixed martial arts ===
- Russian MMA Union
  - Russian Championship-Omsk, Russia (2015 at lightweight)
- World Mixed Martial Arts Association (WMMAA)
  - World Championship-Prague, Czech Republic (2015 at lightweight)

=== Professional mixed martial arts ===
- Professional Fighters League
  - 2024 PFL Lightweight Championship
- Eagle Fighting Championship/Gorilla Fighting Championship (Note: Federation of MMA of Samara at the time.)
  - GF Lightweight Championship (One time)

== Mixed martial arts record ==
Professional record breakdown
35 matches	28 wins	5 losses
By knockout	11	2
By submission	5	1
By decision	12	2
Draws	2	

Res.	Record	Opponent	Method	Event	Date	Round	Time	Location	Notes
Win	28–5–2	Tracy Reeder	TKO (punches)	PFL Tampa: Cyborg vs. Vieira	August 22, 2026	1	4:37	Tampa, Florida, United States	
Win	27–5–2	Aleksandr Chizov	Decision (unanimous)	PFL Sioux Falls: Storley vs. Zendeli	May 2, 2026	3	5:00	Sioux Falls, South Dakota, United States	Catchweight (160 lb) bout.
Loss	26–5–2	Alfie Davis	Decision (unanimous)	PFL 9 (2025)	August 15, 2025	5	5:00	Charlotte, North Carolina, United States	2025 PFL Lightweight Tournament Final.
Win	26–4–2	Kevin Lee	TKO (punches)	PFL 6 (2025)	June 20, 2025	1	2:37	Wichita, Kansas, United States	2025 PFL Lightweight Tournament Semifinal.
Win	25–4–2	Marc Diakiese	KO (punches)	PFL 3 (2025)	April 18, 2025	1	0:32	Orlando, Florida, United States	2025 PFL Lightweight Tournament Quarterfinal.
Win	24–4–2	Brent Primus	KO (punches)	PFL 10 (2024)	November 29, 2024	3	2:31	Riyadh, Saudi Arabia	Won the 2024 PFL Lightweight Tournament.
Win	23–4–2	Michael Dufort	KO (punches)	PFL 8 (2024)	August 16, 2024	2	1:51	Hollywood, Florida, United States	2024 PFL Lightweight Tournament Semifinal.
Win	22–4–2	Elvin Espinoza	Decision (unanimous)	PFL 5 (2024)	June 21, 2024	3	5:00	Salt Lake City, Utah, United States	
Win	21–4–2	Solomon Renfro	Decision (unanimous)	PFL 2 (2024)	April 12, 2024	3	5:00	Las Vegas, Nevada, United States	
Win	20–4–2	Pieter Buist	Decision (unanimous)	Bellator 297	June 16, 2023	3	5:00	Chicago, Illinois, United States	
Win	19–4–2	Koji Takeda	Decision (unanimous)	Bellator MMA vs. Rizin	December 31, 2022	3	5:00	Saitama, Japan	
Win	18–4–2	Bobby King	Decision (unanimous)	Bellator 283	July 12, 2022	3	5:00	Tacoma, Washington, United States	
Win	17–4–2	Jay-Jay Wilson	Decision (unanimous)	Bellator 276	March 12, 2022	3	5:00	Saint Louis, Missouri, United States	
Win	16–4–2	Daniel Carey	KO (punch)	Bellator 263	July 31, 2021	1	3:57	Inglewood, California, United States	Catchweight (150 lb) bout.
Win	15–4–2	Valery Gritsutin	Decision (unanimous)	Eagle FC 33	February 9, 2021	3	5:00	Moscow, Russia	
Loss	14–4–2	Mehdi Dakaev	Decision (unanimous)	Eagle FC 30	December 4, 2020	5	5:00	Moscow, Russia	Lost the Eagle FC Lightweight Championship.
Win	14–3–2	Joao Paulo de Moura e Silva	Decision (unanimous)	Gorilla Fighting 24	February 9, 2020	3	5:00	Saratov, Russia	Won the vacant GF Lightweight Championship.
Win	13–3–2	Oton Jasse	TKO (punches)	Gorilla Fighting 22	December 13, 2019	3	1:59	Krasnodar, Russia	
Win	12–3–2	Steven Siler	Decision (unanimous)	PFL 2 (2019)	May 23, 2019	3	5:00	Uniondale, New York, United States	Featherweight bout.
Win	11–3–2	Bekbolot Abdylda	Decision (unanimous)	Fight Nights Global 90	October 19, 2018	3	5:00	Moscow, Russia	
Win	10–3–2	Igor Tarytsa	Decision (unanimous)	Fight Nights Global 83	February 22, 2018	3	5:00	Moscow, Russia	Return to Lightweight.
Win	9–3–2	Turganally Abdullaev	TKO (punches)	Fight Nights Global 74	September 29, 2017	2	4:59	Moscow, Russia	
Draw	8–3–2	Evgeniy Ignatiev	Draw (overturned by Russian MMA Union)	Fight Nights Global 61	March 11, 2017	3	5:00	Bryansk, Russia	Return to Featherweight. Originally a majority decision win for Ignatiev, overturned later.
Loss	8–3–1	Kuat Khamitov	Technical Submission (arm-triangle choke)	Fight Nights Global 57	December 16, 2016	3	3:48	Moscow, Russia	
Win	8–2–1	Ruslan Yamanbaev	Submission (rear-naked choke)	Fight Nights Global 51	September 25, 2016	2	1:49	Dagestan, Russia	Catchweight (150 lb) bout.
Win	7–2–1	Vadim Kharin	TKO (punches)	Altay League: Siberian Battle	September 14, 2014	1	2:24	Kemerovo, Russia	
Win	6–2–1	Viskhan Magomadov	TKO (doctor stoppage)	Liga Kavkaz: Battle in Khiv 2	August 10, 2014	2	4:57	Dagestan, Russia	
Loss	5–2–1	Gusein Esenbaev	TKO (punches)	I.D MMA 6	September 21, 2013	2	0:00	Saint Petersburg, Russia	
Win	5–1–1	Asalbek Kalandarov	Submission (rear-naked choke)	Open Dag FC 5	September 20, 2013	1	2:16	Dagestan, Russia	
Win	4–1–1	Arslan Zagirov	TKO (punches)	Open Dag FC 3	August 25, 2013	1	1:57	Dagestan, Russia	
Draw	3–1–1	Islam Kamaev	Draw	Liga Kavkaz: Grand Umakhan Battle	July 7, 2013	2	5:00	Khunzakh, Russia	
Win	3–1	Rustam Khasanov	Submission (triangle choke)	I.D MMA 3	March 23, 2013	1	4:27	Saint Petersburg, Russia	
Loss	2–1	Gusein Esenbaev	TKO (punches)	I.D MMA 3	March 23, 2013	1	1:45	Saint Petersburg, Russia	
Win	2–0	Zagir Kazakov	Submission (triangle choke)	I.D MMA 3	March 23, 2013	1	1:21	Saint Petersburg, Russia	Lightweight debut.
Win	1–0	Evgeny Sokha	Submission (kimura)	Octagon MMA Warriors 2013	February 21, 2013	2	4:14	Zhukovsky, Russia	Featherweight debut.

== See also ==
- List of current Bellator MMA fighters
- List of male mixed martial artists
