= PFL Lyon: Nemkov vs. Ferreira =

Professional Fighters League MMA event in 2025

- The poster for PFL Lyon: Nemkov vs. Ferreira
- Promotion: Professional Fighters League
- Date: December 13, 2025
- Venue: LDLC Arena
- City: Décines-Charpieu, France

Event chronology
PFL MENA 4	PFL Lyon: Nemkov vs. Ferreira	PFL Africa 4

PFL Lyon: Nemkov vs. Ferreira (also known as PFL Europe Finals: Lyon 2025) was a mixed martial arts event produced by the Professional Fighters League that took place on December 13, 2025, at LDLC Arena in Décines-Charpieu, France.

== Background ==
The event marked the promotion's second visit to Décines-Charpieu in the Metropolis of Lyon and first since PFL Europe 4 (2024) in December 2024.

The event was headlined by an inaugural PFL Heavyweight Championship bout between former Bellator Light Heavyweight World Champion Vadim Nemkov and 2023 PFL Heavyweight Tournament winner Renan Ferreira.

In addition, a PFL Women's Featherweight Championship bout between former Strikeforce, Invicta FC, UFC and Bellator Women's Featherweight World Champion Cris Cyborg and Sara Collins served as the co-main event.

The event also included the finals of 2025 PFL Europe Tournament in a lightweight and bantamweight divisions.

== Results ==
Main card (ESPN App)
Weight class				Method	Round	Time	Notes
Heavyweight	Vadim Nemkov	def.	Renan Ferreira	Submission (arm-triangle choke)	1	4:00	(Note: For the inaugural PFL Heavyweight Championship.)
Women's Featherweight	Cris Cyborg (c)	def.	Sara Collins	Submission (face crank)	3	2:55	(Note: For the PFL Women's Featherweight Championship.)
Welterweight	Patrick Habirora	def.	Kevin Jousset	KO (punches)	1	2:42
Bantamweight	Taylor Lapilus	def.	Liam Gittins	Decision (unanimous) (29–28, 30–27, 30–27)	3	5:00
Preliminary card (ESPN App)
Bantamweight	Baris Adiguzel	def.	Dean Garnett	TKO (punches)	1	0:44	(Note: 2025 PFL Europe Bantamweight Tournament Final.)
Light Heavyweight	Boris Mbarga Atangana	def.	Guilherme Soares	Submission (rear-naked choke)	2	2:35
Lightweight	Aleksandr Chizov	def.	Connor Hughes	KO (punches)	3	0:50	(Note: 2025 PFL Europe Lightweight Tournament Final.)
Bantamweight	Gustavo Oliveira	def.	Movsar Ibragimov	KO (punches)	2	0:34
Women's Flyweight	Sabrina de Sousa	def.	Paulina Wiśniewska	Decision (split) (29–28, 28–29, 29–28)	3	5:00
Bantamweight	Rayan Balbali	def.	Levi Batchelor	Decision (split) (28–29, 29–28, 30–27)	3	5:00

== 2025 PFL Europe Tournament ==
=== 2025 PFL Europe Lightweight Tournament ===
Quarter-finals
(England) Connor Hughes	KO
(Belgium) Sebastien Di Franco	1
(Republic of Ireland) Decky McAleenan	3
(Spain) Gino van Steenis	UD
(England) Gavin Hughes	3
(Italy) Claudio Pacella	UD
(Scotland) Mark Ewen	1
(Latvia) Aleksandr Chizov	TKO

Semi-finals
(England) Connor Hughes	KO
(Spain) Gino van Steenis	1
(Italy) Claudio Pacella	3
(Latvia) Aleksandr Chizov	SD

Final
(England) Connor Hughes	3
(Latvia) Aleksandr Chizov	KO

=== 2025 PFL Europe Bantamweight Tournament ===
Quarter-finals
(France) Mahio Campanella	UD
(Latvia) Matiss Zaharovs	3
(France) Anas Azizoun	1
(Portugal) Gustavo Oliveira	KO
(England) Dean Garnett	UD
(Finland) Tuomas Grönvall (Note: Alexander Luster withdrew from the tournament due to an injury and was replaced by Tuomas Grönvall.)	3
(Poland) Jan Ciepłowski	TKO
(France) Julien Lopez	1

Semi-finals
(France) Baris Adiguzel (Note: Mahio Campanella withdrew from the tournament and was replaced by Baris Adiguzel.)	KO
(France) Julien Lopez (Note: Gustavo Oliveira was forced to withdraw due to a cut sustained in training and was replaced by Julien Lopez.)	1
(England) Dean Garnett	SUB
(Poland) Jan Ciepłowski	3

Final
(France) Baris Adiguzel	TKO
(England) Dean Garnett	1

== See also ==
- 2025 in Professional Fighters League
- List of PFL events
- List of current PFL fighters
