= Alfie Davis =

English mixed martial artist (born 1992)

- Born: 25 February 1992 (age 34); Enfield, London, England
- Other names: The Axe Man
- Height: 5 ft 11 in (1.80 m)
- Weight: 154 lb (70 kg; 11.0 st)
- Division: Lightweight; Welterweight
- Reach: 70.0 in (178 cm)
- Fighting out of: England
- Team: London Shootfighters
- Years active: 2014-present

Mixed martial arts record
- Total: 28
- Wins: 20
- By knockout: 6
- By submission: 3
- By decision: 11
- Losses: 7
- By submission: 2
- By decision: 5
- Draws: 1

Other information
- Mixed martial arts record from Sherdog

Alfie Ronald Davis (born 25 February 1992) is an English professional mixed martial artist. He competes in the lightweight division for the Professional Fighters League (PFL). He won the 2025 PFL Lightweight Tournament. A professional since 2014, he previously competed in Ultimate Challenge MMA, where he held the lightweight championship, as well as Cage Warriors, Konfrontacja Sztuk Walki (KSW) and Bellator MMA. As of August 21, 2026, he is #3 in the PFL lightweight rankings.

== Professional mixed martial arts career ==
=== Early career ===
Davis made his MMA debut on UCMMA where he faced Cilas Matos on 1 February 2014, at UCMMA 38, winning the bout by submission via brabo choke. He then went on to win his next six out of seven bouts prior to his first bout at Bellator, including winning the UCMMA Lightweight Championship at UCMMA 44 on 5 September 2015 and the LFC Welterweight Championship at LFC 11 on 12 March 2017.

Davis faced Jay Dos at Bellator 179 on 19 May 2017. He won the fight by spinning side kick knockout in the first round.

Moving to the Phoenix Fighting Championship, Davis faced Youssef Wehbe at Phoenix FC 3 on 22 September 2017, winning the bout by unanimous decision

Davis faced Rico Allen on 12 May 2018, at UCMMA 55. He won the bout by TKO with an axe kick.

Davis faced Leszek Krakowski at KSW 45: De Fries vs. Bedorf on 6 October 2018. He lost the bout by split decision.

=== Bellator MMA ===
Returning to Bellator, Davis faced Daniele Scatizzi at Bellator 217 on 2 February 2019. He won the bout by unanimous decision.

Davis faced Jorge Kanella at Bellator 223 on 22 June 2019. He won the bout by unanimous decision.

Davis faced Alessandro Botti at Bellator London 2 on 23 November 2019. He won the bout by unanimous decision.

Davis faced Akonne Wanliss at Bellator Milan 2 on 26 September 2020. He won the bout by unanimous decision.

Davis faced Alexandr Shabliy on 21 May 2021, at Bellator 259. He lost the bout by unanimous decision.

Davis faced Tim Wilde on 13 May 2022, at Bellator 281. The bout ended as a majority draw.

Davis faced Thibault Gouti on 29 October 2022, at Bellator 287. He won the bout via unanimous decision.

Davis faced Aalon Cruz on 11 August 2023, at Bellator 298. He won the bout by unanimous decision.

Davis faced Oscar Ownsworth on 22 March 2024, at Bellator Champions Series 1. He won the bout by unanimous decision.

=== Professional Fighters League ===
==== 2024 season ====
Making his PFL debut, Davis faced Mansour Barnaoui on 29 November 2024, at PFL 10. He lost the fight by a rear-naked choke submission in the third round.

==== 2025 season ====
On 26 February 2025, the promotion officially revealed that Davis joined the 2025 PFL Lightweight Tournament.

In the quarterfinal, Davis faced Clay Collard on 18 April 2025, at PFL 3. He won the bout by TKO in the first round.

In the semifinals, Davis faced Brent Primus on 20 June 2025, at PFL 6. He won the bout by unanimous decision.

In the final, Davis faced Gadzhi Rabadanov on 15 August 2025, at PFL 9. He won the bout by unanimous decision to win the tournament.

==== 2026 ====
Davis faced Usman Nurmagomedov for the PFL Lightweight Championship on 7 February 2026, at PFL Dubai. He lost the bout via submission in the third round.

Davis rematched against Alexandr Shabliy on June 27, 2026, at PFL San Diego. He lost the fight via unanimous decision.

== Championships and accomplishments ==
=== Mixed martial arts ===
- Lion Fighting Championships
  - LFC Welterweight Championship (One time)
- Professional Fighters League
  - 2025 PFL Lightweight Tournament Champion
- Ultimate Challenge MMA
  - UCMMA Lightweight Championship (One time)

== Mixed martial arts record ==
Professional record breakdown
28 matches	20 wins	7 losses
By knockout	6	0
By submission	3	2
By decision	11	5
Draws	1	

Res.	Record	Opponent	Method	Event	Date	Round	Time	Location	Notes
Loss	20–7–1	Alexandr Shabliy	Decision (unanimous)	PFL San Diego: McKee vs. Isbulaev	June 27, 2026	3	5:00	San Diego, California, United States	
Loss	20–6–1	Usman Nurmagomedov	Technical Submission (reverse arm-triangle choke)	PFL Dubai: Nurmagomedov vs. Davis	February 7, 2026	3	4:41	Dubai, United Arab Emirates	For the PFL Lightweight Championship.
Win	20–5–1	Gadzhi Rabadanov	Decision (unanimous)	PFL 9 (2025)	August 15, 2025	5	5:00	Charlotte, North Carolina, United States	Won the 2025 PFL Lightweight Tournament.
Win	19–5–1	Brent Primus	Decision (unanimous)	PFL 6 (2025)	June 20, 2025	3	5:00	Wichita, Kansas, United States	2025 PFL Lightweight Tournament Semifinal.
Win	18–5–1	Clay Collard	TKO (spinning back elbow and punches)	PFL 3 (2025)	April 18, 2025	1	2:12	Orlando, Florida, United States	2025 PFL Lightweight Tournament Quarterfinal.
Loss	17–5–1	Mansour Barnaoui	Submission (rear-naked choke)	PFL 10 (2024)	November 29, 2024	3	3:41	Riyadh, Saudi Arabia	
Win	17–4–1	Oscar Ownsworth	Decision (unanimous)	Bellator Champions Series 1	22 March 2024	3	5:00	Belfast, Northern Ireland	
Win	16–4–1	Aalon Cruz	Decision (unanimous)	Bellator 298	August 11, 2023	3	5:00	Sioux Falls, South Dakota, United States	
Win	15–4–1	Thibault Gouti	Decision (unanimous)	Bellator 287	October 29, 2022	3	5:00	Milan, Italy	
Draw	14–4–1	Tim Wilde	Draw (majority)	Bellator 281	May 13, 2022	3	5:00	London, England	Wilde was deducted one point in round 1 due to grabbing the fence.
Loss	14–4	Alexandr Shabliy	Decision (unanimous)	Bellator 259	May 21, 2021	3	5:00	Uncasville, Connecticut, United States	
Win	14–3	Akonne Wanliss	Decision (unanimous)	Bellator Milan 2	September 26, 2020	3	5:00	Milan, Italy	
Win	13–3	Alessandro Botti	Decision (unanimous)	Bellator London 2	November 23, 2019	3	5:00	London, England	
Win	12–3	Jorge Kanella	Decision (unanimous)	Bellator 223	June 22, 2019	3	5:00	London, England	
Win	11–3	Daniele Scatizzi	Decision (unanimous)	Bellator 217	February 23, 2019	3	5:00	Dublin, Ireland	Catchweight (165 lb) bout.
Loss	10–3	Leszek Krakowski	Decision (split)	KSW 45	October 6, 2018	3	2:33	London, England	
Win	10–2	Rico Allen	TKO (kick)	Ultimate Challenge MMA 55	May 12, 2018	1	1:18	London, England	Won the vacant UCMMA Welterweight Championship.
Loss	9–2	Anas Siraj Mounir	Decision (unanimous)	Phoenix FC 4	December 17, 2017	3	5:00	Dubai, United Arab Emirates	
Win	9–1	Yousef Wehbe	Decision (unanimous)	Phoenix FC 3	September 22, 2017	3	5:00	London, England	
Win	8–1	Jay Dods	TKO (kick to the body)	Bellator 179	May 19, 2017	1	2:34	London, England	Return to Lightweight.
Win	7–1	Martin Hudson	Submission (guillotine choke)	Lion FC 11	March 12, 2017	1	4:28	Rochester, England	Welterweight debut. Won the vacant LFC Welterweight Championship.
Win	6–1	Jordan Miller	TKO (punches)	Ultimate Challenge MMA 49	November 12, 2016	1	3:15	London, England	Defended the UCMMA Lightweight Championship.
Win	5–1	Terry Doyle	TKO (punches)	Cage Warriors 75	April 15, 2016	2	2:41	London, England	
Win	4–1	Kostadin Enev	KO (punch)	Ultimate Challenge MMA 44	September 5, 2015	2	0:43	London, England	Won the vacant UCMMA Lightweight Championship.
Win	3–1	Lukas Bienias	Decision (unanimous)	Ultimate Challenge MMA 43	May 2, 2015	3	5:00	London, England	
Loss	2–1	Maksym Matus	Decision (unanimous)	Ultimate Challenge MMA 41	November 8, 2014	3	5:00	London, England	For the UCMMA Lightweight Championship.
Win	2–0	Aaron Brett	Submission (triangle choke)	Ultimate Challenge MMA 40	September 6, 2014	1	1:26	London, England	
Win	1–0	Cilas Matos	Submission (brabo choke)	Ultimate Challenge MMA 38	February 1, 2014	3	4:30	London, England	Lightweight debut.
