= Brent Primus =

American mixed martial arts fighter

- Born: April 12, 1985 (age 41); Eugene, Oregon, U.S.
- Height: 5 ft 10 in (1.78 m)
- Weight: 155 lb (70 kg; 11.1 st)
- Division: Lightweight
- Reach: 73 in (190 cm)
- Fighting out of: Portland, Oregon, U.S.
- Team: Sports Lab; Team Oyama; Gracie Barra Portland
- Rank: 3rd degree black belt in Brazilian Jiu-Jitsu under Fabiano Scherner
- Years active: 2010–present

Mixed martial arts record
- Total: 23
- Wins: 16
- By knockout: 2
- By submission: 9
- By decision: 5
- Losses: 6
- By knockout: 2
- By decision: 4
- No contests: 1

Other information
- Mixed martial arts record from Sherdog

Brent Primus (born April 12, 1985) is an American mixed martial artist currently competing for the PFL. He formerly competed for Bellator MMA, where he was a one-time Bellator Lightweight World Champion.

== Background ==
Born and raised in Eugene, Oregon, Primus attended Sheldon High School, where he played soccer and helped the team tie South Eugene High School for the co-state title. He later began training in Brazilian jiu-jitsu, earning his black belt in only six years.

Primus had a tumultuous childhood and teenage years, having never seen his real father outside of a prison, except for catching him on an episode of “Cops” once as a child. At the age of 13, he found himself homeless after being kicked out of the house by his step father. After this, he bounced around from home to home until he began selling pounds of weed to finance himself. At 15, Primus had his own house from these proceeds. At age 16, his home was raided by rival gangsters, with Primus held up at gunpoint. At 18, his home was raided by police and Primus was sent to jail. During this time, Primus was partying and finding himself in fights on a weekly basis, leading to one of Primus’ friends to sign him up for an amateur fight, which lead him onto his career in MMA.

== Mixed martial arts career ==
=== Early career ===
Primus compiled an amateur record of 5-1 before making his professional debut in September 2010, defeating Chris Ensley via first-round submission. In his second pro bout, Primus defeated Roy Bradshaw via submission in the first round on May 12, 2012.

=== Bellator MMA ===
Primus signed with Bellator in 2013. He made his debut for the organization on September 27, 2013, at Bellator 101 against Scott Thometz. Primus won via rear-naked choke submission at 3:48 in the first round, improving his record to 3–0.

Primus had his second bout with the organization on November 22, 2013, at Bellator 109. He defeated Brett Glass by rear-naked choke submission in the first round.

In his next bout, Primus faced Chris Jones at Bellator 111 on March 7, 2014. Primus won via TKO in the first round, which marked the first time Primus had finished an opponent that was not by rear-naked choke.

After nearly a year-and-a-half away from the sport, Primus returned to face Derek Anderson at Bellator 141 on August 28, 2015. He won the fight by split decision.

Primus next faced Gleristone Santos at Bellator 153 on April 22, 2016. He won the fight by split decision.

==== Bellator Lightweight World Champion ====
With an undefeated streak of five wins in Bellator, Primus faced Bellator Lightweight champion Michael Chandler at Bellator NYC on June 24, 2017. At 2:22 in the first round, the bout was temporarily halted by the referee to check on Chandler, whose left ankle was visibly injured. The bout was stopped in favor of Primus via TKO, awarding him the Bellator Lightweight World Championship and pulling off one of the biggest upsets in Bellator history.

Primus was expected to make his first title defense against Chandler in a rematch at Bellator 197 on April 13, 2018. However, he pulled out of the fight due to a knee injury. As a result, Brandon Girtz stepped in as a replacement.

The rematch between Primus and Chandler finally took place in the main event of Bellator 212 on December 14, 2018. Primus was out-wrestled for the better part of the fight, and despite landing similar leg kicks to those that stopped Chandler in their first fight and dropping Chandler with a punch in the second round, Primus was defeated by Chandler via unanimous decision.

==== Post-title era ====
As the first fight after losing his title, Primus faced Tim Wilde at Bellator: Birmingham on May 4, 2019. He won the fight via gogoplata in the first round.

Primus was expected to face Peter Queally at Bellator 240 on February 22, 2020. However, Queally was forced to withdraw from the bout due to knee injury and was subsequently replaced by Chris Bungard. Primus won the bout via neck-crank submission in the 1st round.

On April 17, 2021, Primus announced signing a new 6-fight contract.

Primus faced Islam Mamedov on July 31, 2021, at Bellator 263. He lost the bout via split decision.

Primus faced Benson Henderson on October 16, 2021, at Bellator 268. He won the fight via unanimous decision.

Primus faced Alexandr Shabliy at Bellator 282 on June 24, 2022. He lost the bout via TKO in the second round.

==== Lightweight Grand Prix ====
After an original contestant of the $1 million Bellator Lightweight World Grand Prix, Sidney Outlaw, was suspended for a positive drug test, Primus replaced him for the quarter-final bout against Mansour Barnaoui on May 12, 2023, at Bellator 296. Primus won the back-and-forth bout by unanimous decision.

In the semifinals, Primus faced reigning champion Usman Nurmagomedov on 7 October 2023, at Bellator 300. He originally lost the fight by unanimous decision but that result was overturned by CSAC when Nurmagomedov tested positive for prescription drug that contained a banned substance.

=== Professional Fighters League ===
Primus started the 2024 season with a bout against Bruno Miranda on April 12, 2024 at PFL 2. He won the fight due to a rear-naked choke submission.

Primus next faced Solomon Renfro at PFL 5 on June 21, 2024 Renfro would miss the Lightweight limit weighing in at 157.4 pounds. Primus would win the fight via submission in the third round and thus secure himself the top seed for the playoff section of the PFL Lightweight tournament.

Primus faced Clay Collard in the semifinals of the 2024 Lightweight tournament on August 16, 2024 at PFL 8. He won the fight by unanimous decision.

In the final, Primus faced Gadzhi Rabadanov on November 29, 2024, at PFL 10. He lost the fight by knockout in the third round.

On February 26, 2025, the promotion officially revealed that Primus will join the 2025 PFL Lightweight Tournament.

In the quarterfinal, Primus was scheduled to face Alexandr Shabliy on April 18, 2025, at PFL 3. However, Shabliy withdrew from the tournament due to undisclosed reasons and was replaced by Vinicius Sacchelli Cenci. Primus won the fight via a rear-naked choke submission in the third round.

In the semifinals, Primus faced Alfie Davis. He lost the bout via unanimous decision.

== Championships and awards ==
- Bellator MMA
  - Bellator Lightweight World Championship (One time)
- MMAJunkie.com
  - 2019 May Submission of the Month vs. Tim Wilde

== Mixed martial arts record ==
Professional record breakdown
23 matches	16 wins	6 losses
By knockout	2	2
By submission	9	0
By decision	5	4
No contests	1	

Res.	Record	Opponent	Method	Event	Date	Round	Time	Location	Notes
Loss	16–6 (1)	Pavel Gordeev	Decision (unanimous)	ACA 202	April 12, 2026	3	5:00	Saint Petersburg, Russia	
Loss	16–5 (1)	Alfie Davis	Decision (unanimous)	PFL 6 (2025)	June 20, 2025	3	5:00	Wichita, Kansas, United States	2025 PFL Lightweight Tournament Semifinal.
Win	16–4 (1)	Vinicius Sacchelli Cenci	Submission (rear-naked choke)	PFL 3 (2025)	April 18, 2025	3	4:52	Orlando, Florida, United States	2025 PFL Lightweight Tournament Quarterfinal.
Loss	15–4 (1)	Gadzhi Rabadanov	KO (punches)	PFL 10 (2024)	November 29, 2024	3	2:31	Riyadh, Saudi Arabia	2024 PFL Lightweight Tournament Final.
Win	15–3 (1)	Clay Collard	Decision (unanimous)	PFL 8 (2024)	August 16, 2024	3	5:00	Hollywood, Florida, United States	2024 PFL Lightweight Tournament Semifinal.
Win	14–3 (1)	Solomon Renfro	Submission (rear-naked choke)	PFL 5 (2024)	June 21, 2024	3	3:21	Salt Lake City, Utah, United States	Catchweight (156.4 lb) bout; Renfro missed weight.
Win	13–3 (1)	Bruno Miranda	Submission (rear-naked choke)	PFL 2 (2024)	April 12, 2024	2	1:49	Las Vegas, Nevada, United States	
NC	12–3 (1)	Usman Nurmagomedov	NC (overturned)	Bellator 300	October 7, 2023	5	5:00	San Diego, California, United States	Bellator Lightweight World Grand Prix Semifinal. For the Bellator Lightweight World Championship. Originally a unanimous decision win for Nurmagomedov; overturned after he tested positive for a banned substance.
Win	12–3	Mansour Barnaoui	Decision (unanimous)	Bellator 296	May 12, 2023	5	5:00	Paris, France	Bellator Lightweight World Grand Prix Quarterfinal.
Loss	11–3	Alexandr Shabliy	TKO (punches)	Bellator 282	June 24, 2022	2	1:22	Uncasville, Connecticut, United States	
Win	11–2	Benson Henderson	Decision (unanimous)	Bellator 268	October 16, 2021	3	5:00	Phoenix, Arizona, United States	
Loss	10–2	Islam Mamedov	Decision (split)	Bellator 263	July 31, 2021	3	5:00	Los Angeles, California, United States	
Win	10–1	Chris Bungard	Submission (neck crank)	Bellator 240	February 22, 2020	1	1:55	Dublin, Ireland	
Win	9–1	Tim Wilde	Submission (gogoplata)	Bellator Birmingham	May 4, 2019	1	1:20	Birmingham, England	
Loss	8–1	Michael Chandler	Decision (unanimous)	Bellator 212	December 14, 2018	5	5:00	Honolulu, Hawaii, United States	Lost the Bellator Lightweight World Championship.
Win	8–0	Michael Chandler	TKO (doctor stoppage)	Bellator NYC	June 24, 2017	1	2:22	New York City, New York, United States	Won the Bellator Lightweight World Championship.
Win	7–0	Gleristone Santos	Decision (split)	Bellator 153	April 22, 2016	3	5:00	Uncasville, Connecticut, United States	
Win	6–0	Derek Anderson	Decision (split)	Bellator 141	August 28, 2015	3	5:00	Temecula, California, United States	
Win	5–0	Chris Jones	TKO (punches)	Bellator 111	March 7, 2014	1	1:45	Thackerville, Oklahoma, United States	
Win	4–0	Brett Glass	Submission (rear-naked choke)	Bellator 109	November 22, 2013	1	3:20	Bethlehem, Pennsylvania, United States	
Win	3–0	Scott Thometz	Submission (rear-naked choke)	Bellator 101	September 27, 2013	1	3:48	Portland, Oregon, United States	
Win	2–0	Roy Bradshaw	Submission (rear-naked choke)	Midtown Throwdown 4	May 12, 2012	1	1:42	Eugene, Oregon, United States	Lightweight debut.
Win	1–0	Chris Ensley	Submission (rear-naked choke)	Brass Knuckle Promotions: Springfield Throwdown 1	September 24, 2010	1	1:05	Springfield, Oregon, United States	Welterweight debut.

== Submission grappling record ==
? Matches, ? Wins (? Submissions), ? Losses (? Submissions), 0 Draws
Result	Rec.	Opponent	Method	Event	Division	Date	Location
Loss	3–5–0	(United States) Craig Jones	Submission (Rear Naked Choke)	Submission Underground 19		December 20, 2020	Portland, Oregon, U.S.
Win	3–4–0	(United States) Jake Shields	Submission (armbar)	Submission Underground 14		May 31, 2020	Portland, Oregon, U.S.
Loss	2–4–0	(United States) Gabriel Rollo	Points	Pan Am Jiu Jitsu 2013		May 23, 2013	
Loss	2–3–0	(United States) Bernardo Faria	Armlock	Pan Am Jiu Jitsu 2013		May 23, 2013	
Win	2–2–0	(United States) Oliver Geddes	-	Pan Am Jiu Jitsu 2013		May 23, 2013	
Loss	1–2–0	(United States) Otavio Sousa	-	Pan Am Jiu Jitsu 2012		May 30, 2012	
Loss	1–1–0	(United States) Murilo Santana	Points	Pan Am Jiu Jitsu 2012		May 30, 2012	
Win	1–0–0	(United States) Chris Atkins	Choke	Pan Am Jiu Jitsu 2012		May 30, 2012	

== See also ==
- List of current Bellator fighters
- List of male mixed martial artists
