= PFL 10 (2024) =

Mixed martial arts event

- The poster for PFL 10
- Promotion: Professional Fighters League
- Date: November 29, 2024
- Venue: King Saud University Stadium
- City: Riyadh, Saudi Arabia

Event chronology
PFL Super Fights: Battle of the Giants	PFL 10	PFL Europe 4

The PFL 10 mixed martial arts event for the 2024 season of the Professional Fighters League was held on November 29, 2024, at King Saud University Stadium in Riyadh, Saudi Arabia. This was the finale of the playoffs for all weight divisions, with the winners getting a $1 million cash prize.

== Background ==
The event marked the promotion's first championships season held outside the United States.

The event featured the finals of 2024 PFL Tournament season in a six weight-class divisions.

At the preliminary card took place the four finals of 2024 PFL MENA Tournament. Islam Reda pulled out of the featherweight final against Abdalrahman Alhyasat due to injury and was replaced by Abdullah Al-Qahtani. In turn, Alhyasat withdrew due to a "urgent health problem" and was replaced by Maraoune Bellagouit.

At the weigh-ins, Lilia Osmani came in at 108.3 lb, 2.3 pounds over the atomweight limit and she was fined a percentage that went to Hattan Alsaif. 2023 PFL featherweight winner Jesus Pinedo reportedly came in 6 pounds heavy for his featherweight against Jeremy Kennedy. As a result, Pinedo pulled out and was replaced by Gabriel Alves Braga on a day's notice.

== Results ==
Main card - 2024 PFL World Championship (ESPN+)
Weight class				Method	Round	Time	Notes
Featherweight	Timur Khizriev	def.	Brendan Loughnane	Decision (unanimous) (50–45, 49–46, 49–46)	5	5:00	(Note: 2024 PFL World Featherweight Championship Tournament Final.)
Women's Flyweight	Dakota Ditcheva	def.	Taila Santos	TKO (punches to the body)	2	4:41	(Note: 2024 PFL Women's World Flyweight Championship Tournament Final.)
Light Heavyweight	Dovletdzhan Yagshimuradov	def.	Impa Kasanganay	KO (punches)	1	0:58	(Note: 2024 PFL World Light Heavyweight Championship Tournament Final.)
Welterweight	Shamil Musaev	def.	Magomed Umalatov	TKO (punches)	3	1:44	(Note: 2024 PFL World Welterweight Championship Tournament Final.)
Lightweight	Gadzhi Rabadanov	def.	Brent Primus	KO (punches)	3	2:31	(Note: 2024 PFL World Lightweight Championship Tournament Final.)
Heavyweight	Denis Goltsov	def.	Oleg Popov	Technical Submission (triangle choke)	1	2:55	(Note: 2024 PFL World Heavyweight Championship Tournament Final.)
Preliminary card - 2024 PFL MENA Championship (ESPN+)
Featherweight	Abdullah Al-Qahtani	def.	Maraoune Bellagouit	KO (punches)	1	3:21	(Note: 2024 PFL MENA Featherweight Championship Tournament Final.)
Welterweight	Omar El Dafrawy	def.	Mohammad Alaqraa	TKO (punches)	2	0:57	(Note: 2024 PFL MENA Welterweight Championship Tournament Final.)
Women's Atomweight	Hattan Alsaif	def.	Lilya Osmani	TKO (knees to the body)	2	1:37	(Note: Amateur bout. Osmani missed weight (108.3 lb).)
Bantamweight	Ali Taleb	def.	Rachid El Hazoume	KO (punch)	1	1:25	(Note: 2024 PFL MENA Bantamweight Championship Tournament Final.)
Lightweight	Mohsen Mohammadseifi	def.	Georges Eid	Decision (unanimous) (50–45, 50–45, 49–46)	5	5:00	(Note: 2024 PFL MENA Lightweight Championship Tournament Final.)
Early preliminary card (ESPN+)
Lightweight	Mansour Barnaoui	def.	Alfie Davis	Submission (rear-naked choke)	3	3:41
Heavyweight	Slim Trabelsi	def.	Abraham Bably	Decision (split) (29–28, 28–29, 29–28)	3	5:00
Featherweight	Gabriel Alves Braga	def.	Jeremy Kennedy	Decision (unanimous) (29–28, 29–28, 29–28)	3	5:00
Featherweight	Asaël Adjoudj	def.	Jose Perez	Submission (guillotine choke)	3	1:10
Welterweight	Costello van Steenis	def.	João Vitor Dantas	KO (head kick)	1	0:48

== Playoff brackets ==
=== 2024 PFL Heavyweight playoffs ===
Semifinals
1	(Russia) Denis Goltsov	TKO
4	(United States) Timothy Johnson	1
2	(Russia) Oleg Popov	UD
6	(England) Linton Vassell (Note: Popov was originally scheduled to face #3 ranked Valentin Moldavsky, but he forced to withdraw due to injury and was replaced by #6 ranked Linton Vassell.)	3

Finals
1	(Russia) Denis Goltsov	SUB
2	(Russia) Oleg Popov	1

=== 2024 PFL Light Heavyweight playoffs ===
Semifinals
1	(United States) Impa Kasanganay	UD
4	(United States) Josh Silveira	3
2	(Australia) Rob Wilkinson	3
3	(Turkmenistan) Dovletdzhan Yagshimuradov	UD

Finals
1	(United States) Impa Kasanganay	1
3	(Turkmenistan) Dovletdzhan Yagshimuradov	KO

=== 2024 PFL Welterweight playoffs ===
Semifinals
1	(Russia) Shamil Musaev	UD
4	(Russia) Murad Ramazanov	3
2	(Russia) Magomed Umalatov	UD
7	(Brazil) Neiman Gracie (Note: Umalatov was originally scheduled to face #3 ranked Don Madge, but he forced to withdraw due to injury and was replaced by #7 ranked Neiman Gracie.)	3

Finals
1	(Russia) Shamil Musaev	TKO
2	(Russia) Magomed Umalatov	3

=== 2024 PFL Lightweight playoffs ===
Semifinals
1	(United States) Brent Primus	UD
4	(United States) Clay Collard	3
2	(Russia) Gadzhi Rabadanov	KO
3	(Canada) Michael Dufort	2

Finals
1	(United States) Brent Primus	3
2	(Russia) Gadzhi Rabadanov	KO

=== 2024 PFL Featherweight playoffs ===
Semifinals
1	(England) Brendan Loughnane	SD
4	(United States) Kai Kamaka III	3
2	(Brazil) Gabriel Alves Braga	3
3	(Russia) Timur Khizriev	SD

Finals
1	(England) Brendan Loughnane	5
3	(Russia) Timur Khizriev	UD

=== 2024 PFL Women's Flyweight playoffs ===
Semifinals
1	(England) Dakota Ditcheva	TKO
4	(United States) Jena Bishop	1
2	(Brazil) Taila Santos	UD
3	(United States) Liz Carmouche	3

Finals
1	(England) Dakota Ditcheva	TKO
2	(Brazil) Taila Santos	2

Legend
(SD)	(Split Decision)
(UD)	(Unanimous Decision)
(MD)	(Majority Decision)
SUB	Submission
(T)KO	(Technical) Knock Out
L	Loss

== PFL MENA brackets ==
=== Welterweight ===
Quarter-finals
(Egypt) Omar El-Dafrawy	UD
(Lebanon) Anthony Zeidan	3
(Jordan) Jarrah Al-Silawi	SUB
(Algeria) Rayan Atmani	1
(Iran) Amir Fazli	3
(Morocco) Badreddine Diani	UD
(Kuwait) Mohammad Alaqraa	TKO
(France) Youcef Ouabbas	3

Semi-finals
(Egypt) Omar El-Dafrawy	KO
(Jordan) Jarrah Al-Silawi	1
(Iran) Amir Fazli (Note: Alaqraa was originally scheduled to face Badreddine Diani, but he forced to withdraw due to an undisclosed injury and was replaced by Amir Fazli.)	3
(Kuwait) Mohammad Alaqraa	UD

Final
(Egypt) Omar El-Dafrawy	TKO
(Kuwait) Mohammad Alaqraa	2

=== Lightweight ===
Quarter-finals
(Egypt) Ahmed Amir	3
(France) Souhil Tahiri	UD
(Lebanon) Josh Togo	1
(Iran) Mohsen Mohammadseifi	TKO
(Lebanon) Georges Eid	UD
(Pakistan) Abbas Khan	3
(Kuwait) Abdullah Saleem	SUB (Note: Originally a submission (triangle choke) win for Saleem; overturned after he failed an in-competition drug test, Reguigui advanced to semifinal.)
(Tunisia) Omar Reguigui	1

Semi-finals
(France) Souhil Tahiri	3
(Iran) Mohsen Mohammadseifi	UD
(Lebanon) Georges Eid	TKO
(Tunisia) Omar Reguigui	1

Final
(Iran) Mohsen Mohammadseifi	UD
(Lebanon) Georges Eid	5

=== Featherweight ===
Quarter-finals
(Jordan) Yazeed Hasanain	2
(Saudi Arabia) Abdullah Al-Qahtani	TKO
(Jordan) Abdalrahman Alhyasat	UD
(Egypt) Ahmed Tarek	3
(Egypt) Mido Mohamed	3
(Morocco) Maraoune Bellagouit	TKO
(Egypt) Islam Reda	UD
(Morocco) Adam Meskini	3

Semi-finals
(Saudi Arabia) Abdullah Al-Qahtani	3
(Jordan) Abdalrahman Alhyasat	UD
(Morocco) Maraoune Bellagouit	3
(Egypt) Islam Reda	UD

Final
(Saudi Arabia) Abdullah Al-Qahtani (Note: Islam Reda pulled out with injury and was replaced by Al-Qahtani.)	TKO
(Morocco) Maraoune Bellagouit (Note: Abdalrahman Alhyasat withdrew due to "urgent health problem" and was replaced by Maraoune Bellagouit.)	1

=== Bantamweight ===
Quarter-finals
(Jordan) Jalal Al Daaja (Note: Officially a unanimous decision win for Ismail, Al Daaja advanced to the semifinal due to Ismail missed weight.)	DRAW
(Kuwait) Tariq Ismail	3
(Jordan) Nawras Abzakh	3
(Iraq) Ali Taleb	UD
(Morocco) Xavier Alaoui	2
(Morocco) Rachid El Hazoume	SUB
(Algeria) Elias Boudegzdame	SUB
(Egypt) Hassan Mandour	2r.

Semi-finals
(Jordan) Jalal Al Daaja	1
(Iraq) Ali Taleb	KO
(Morocco) Rachid El Hazoume	UD
(Algeria) Elias Boudegzdame	3

Final
(Iraq) Ali Taleb	KO
(Morocco) Rachid El Hazoume	1

== See also ==
- List of PFL events
- List of PFL champions
- List of current PFL fighters
- Riyadh Season
