= Taila Santos =

Brazilian mixed martial arts fighter

- Born: Taila Jaine dos Santos; June 22, 1993 (age 33); Jaraguá do Sul, Santa Catarina, Brazil
- Height: 5 ft 6 in (1.68 m)
- Weight: 125 lb (57 kg; 8 st 13 lb)
- Division: Flyweight
- Reach: 68.0 in (173 cm)
- Style: Muay Thai
- Stance: Orthodox
- Fighting out of: Balneário Camboriú, Brazil
- Team: Astra Fight Team
- Rank: Blue belt in Brazilian Jiu-Jitsu
- Years active: 2013–present

Mixed martial arts record
- Total: 28
- Wins: 23
- By knockout: 11
- By submission: 4
- By decision: 8
- Losses: 5
- By knockout: 1
- By decision: 4

Other information
- Mixed martial arts record from Sherdog

Taila Jaine dos Santos (born June 22, 1993) is a Brazilian mixed martial artist who currently competes in the women's Flyweight division of the Professional Fighters League (PFL). She formerly competed in the Ultimate Fighting Championship, where she challenged for the UFC Women's Flyweight Championship in June 2022. As of January 27, 2026, she is #3 in the PFL women's flyweight rankings.

== Background ==
With her father being a Muay Thai coach, she started training it at the age of 16, soon afterwards being enrolled in a championship at Chute Boxe of Curitiba, which Taila went to win. Taila started to train Jiu-Jitsu, with her father organizing an MMA fight so that Taila could debut in the sport. She went and won again. Afterwards, her father contacted Marcelo Brigadeiro to organize the trip to Astra Fight, in Balneário Camboriú, where she resides today.

== Mixed martial arts career ==
=== Early career ===
After going the distance in her 2013 pro debut, she would go on to finish her next 10 bouts in the first round. In 2016, her one appearance came against Laisa Coimbra for the Aspera FC Bantamweight Championship. She won the title with an 87-second knockout — via a punch to the body. Taila set to fight with fellow Brazilian prospect Mariana Morais, but Morais withdrew from the Aspera FC 32 bout. Being booked for her Invicta FC debut against Irene Aldana, Santos had to pull out due to visa issues.

After two year layoff, she was invited onto Dana White's Contender Series Brazil 2 where she faced off at Flyweight against Estefani Almeida. She won the unanimous decision and earned a UFC contract.

=== Ultimate Fighting Championship ===
Santos made her UFC debut against Mara Romero Borella on February 2, 2019 at UFC Fight Night: Assunção vs. Moraes 2. She lost the fight by split decision.

Taila faced Molly McCann on 16 July 2020 at UFC on ESPN: Kattar vs. Ige. She won the fight via unanimous decision.

Santos was scheduled to face Maryna Moroz on December 5, 2020 at UFC on ESPN: Hermansson vs. Vettori. However on November 18, it was announced that Moroz had to pull out and she was replaced by Montana De La Rosa. Just hours before the event, the UFC decided to remove the fight after one of De La Rosa's cornermen tested positive for COVID-19. Santos was then rescheduled to face Gillian Robertson two weeks later at UFC Fight Night: Thompson vs. Neal. Santos won the fight via unanimous decision.

Santos was scheduled to face Roxanne Modafferi on May 8, 2021 at UFC on ESPN 24. However, Modafferi was forced to pull out from the event citing a meniscus tear.

Santos was scheduled to face Mandy Böhm on September 4, 2021 at UFC Fight Night 191. However, Santos was pulled from the bout due to visa issues and was replaced by Ariane Lipski.

Santos faced Roxanne Modafferi in a flyweight bout on September 25, 2021 at UFC 266. She won the fight via unanimous decision.

Santos faced Joanne Wood on November 20, 2021 at UFC Fight Night 198. After knocking Wood down twice, Santos won the bout via rear-naked choke at the end of the first round. This fight earned her the Performance of the Night award.

Santos faced Valentina Shevchenko for the UFC Women's Flyweight Championship on June 11, 2022, at UFC 275. She lost the close bout by split decision, becoming the first fighter to win on a judge's scorecard against Shevchenko, in the flyweight division.

Santos was scheduled to face Erin Blanchfield on February 18, 2023 at UFC Fight Night 219. The main event fight between Cory Sandhagen and Marlon Vera was rescheduled to another event, and Santos' fight against Blanchfield was promoted to the main event. However, just one week out from the event, Santos withdrew after her cornermen were denied visas into the United States and was replaced by former UFC Women's Strawweight Champion Jéssica Andrade.

The match with Erin Blanchfield was rebooked and took place on August 26, 2023, at UFC Fight Night 225. She lost the bout via unanimous decision.

On November 7, 2023, it was announced that Santos was no longer under contract with the UFC.

=== Professional Fighters League ===
On March 1, 2024, it was reported that Santos signed with Professional Fighters League.

Santos was scheduled to make her debut against Denise Kielholtz on April 4, 2024 at PFL 1. However, a week before the event it was announced that Kielholtz had pulled out and she would instead face llara Joanne. Santos won the bout by a rear-naked choke submission at the end of the first round.

Santos faced Jena Bishop at PFL 4 on June 13, 2024. She won the bout via split decision.

Santos faced Liz Carmouche in the semi-finals of the 2024 Women's Flyweight tournament at PFL 7 on August 2, 2024. At the weigh-ins, Carmouche missed weight by 1 pound, coming in at 127 pounds. Santos won the bout via unanimous decision.

In the final, Santos faced Dakota Ditcheva on November 29, 2024, at PFL 10. She lost the bout by technical knockout via body punches in the second round leading to the first knockout loss in her career.

On January 15, 2025, it was announced that Santos was join the 2025 PFL World Tournament in their flyweight division.

In the quarterfinal, Santos was scheduled to face Juliana Velasquez on April 11, 2025, at PFL 2. However, Santos withdrew from the tournament and was replaced by Ekaterina Shakalova.

On August 21, 2025 it was announced that Santos had tested positive for Oxandrolone and clenbuterol as the result of an out-of-competition sample collected on March 21, 2025. USADA gave her a 6 month suspension that began on March 21 and will end on September 21, 2025.

Santos faced Yan Qihui on May 2, 2026, at PFL Sioux Falls. She won the fight via technical knockout in round one.

Santos faced Sabrinna de Sousa on August 22, 2026, at PFL Tampa. She lost the bout via unanimous decision.

== Championships and accomplishments ==
=== Mixed martial arts ===
- Ultimate Fighting Championship
  - Performance of the Night (One time) vs. Joanne Wood
  - Tied (Ariane da Silva, Natália Silva, Alexa Grasso & Carli Judice) for most knockdowns in UFC Women's Flyweight division history (3)
  - Most submission attempts in UFC Women's Flyweight division history (9)
  - Highest takedown accuracy percentage in UFC Women's Flyweight division history (75.0%)
  - Third highest takedown defense percentage in UFC Women's Flyweight division history (85.3%)
- Aspera Fighting Championship
  - Aspera FC Bantamweight Championship (One time)

== Mixed martial arts record ==
Professional record breakdown
28 matches	23 wins	5 losses
By knockout	11	1
By submission	4	0
By decision	8	4

Res.	Record	Opponent	Method	Event	Date	Round	Time	Location	Notes
Loss	23–5	Sabrinna de Sousa	Decision (unanimous)	PFL Tampa: Cyborg vs. Vieira	August 22, 2026	3	5:00	Tampa, Florida, United States	
Win	23–4	Yan Qihui	TKO (front kick to the body and punches)	PFL Sioux Falls: Storley vs. Zendeli	May 2, 2026	1	2:02	Sioux Falls, South Dakota, United States	
Loss	22–4	Dakota Ditcheva	TKO (punches to the body)	PFL 10 (2024)	November 29, 2024	2	4:41	Riyadh, Saudi Arabia	2024 PFL Women's Flyweight Tournament Final.
Win	22–3	Liz Carmouche	Decision (unanimous)	PFL 7 (2024)	August 2, 2024	3	5:00	Nashville, Tennessee, United States	2024 PFL Women's Flyweight Tournament Semifinal. Carmouche missed weight (127 lb).
Win	21–3	Jena Bishop	Decision (split)	PFL 4 (2024)	June 13, 2024	3	5:00	Uncasville, Connecticut, United States	
Win	20–3	Ilara Joanne	Submission (rear-naked choke)	PFL 1 (2024)	April 4, 2024	1	3:57	San Antonio, Texas, United States	
Loss	19–3	Erin Blanchfield	Decision (unanimous)	UFC Fight Night: Holloway vs. The Korean Zombie	August 26, 2023	3	5:00	Kallang, Singapore	
Loss	19–2	Valentina Shevchenko	Decision (split)	UFC 275	June 12, 2022	5	5:00	Kallang, Singapore	For the UFC Women's Flyweight Championship.
Win	19–1	Joanne Wood	Submission (rear-naked choke)	UFC Fight Night: Vieira vs. Tate	November 20, 2021	1	4:49	Las Vegas, Nevada, United States	Performance of the Night.
Win	18–1	Roxanne Modafferi	Decision (unanimous)	UFC 266	September 25, 2021	3	5:00	Las Vegas, Nevada, United States	
Win	17–1	Gillian Robertson	Decision (unanimous)	UFC Fight Night: Thompson vs. Neal	December 19, 2020	3	5:00	Las Vegas, Nevada, United States	
Win	16–1	Molly McCann	Decision (unanimous)	UFC on ESPN: Kattar vs. Ige	July 16, 2020	3	5:00	Abu Dhabi, United Arab Emirates	
Loss	15–1	Mara Romero Borella	Decision (split)	UFC Fight Night: Assunção vs. Moraes 2	February 2, 2019	3	5:00	Fortaleza, Brazil	
Win	15–0	Estefani Almeida	Decision (unanimous)	Dana White's Contender Series Brazil 2	August 11, 2018	3	5:00	Las Vegas, Nevada, United States	Return to Flyweight.
Win	14–0	Laisa Coimbra	KO (punch to the body)	Aspera FC 43	August 13, 2016	1	1:27	Paranaguá, Brazil	Won the vacant Aspera FC Bantamweight Championship.
Win	13–0	Bruna Rosso	KO (elbow)	K.O. Combate 2	November 21, 2015	2	3:06	Caçador, Brazil	
Win	12–0	Gisele Moreira	Decision (unanimous)	Aspera FC 23	August 16, 2015	3	5:00	Joinville, Brazil	
Win	11–0	Gisele Pereira	TKO (head kick)	Aspera FC 20	June 6, 2015	1	1:06	Navegantes, Brazil	
Win	10–0	Wellen Taynara Sobrinho	TKO (doctor stoppage)	Aspera FC 19	May 23, 2015	1	5:00	Lages, Brazil	Flyweight bout.
Win	9–0	Ana Paula da Silva	TKO (punches)	Noxii Combat 1	May 17, 2015	1	2:12	Joinville, Brazil	
Win	8–0	Juliana Martins	Submission (keylock)	Aspera FC 17	April 4, 2015	1	0:48	Curitibanos, Brazil	
Win	7–0	Daniela Cristina Patricia	TKO (elbows)	Aspera FC 16	March 29, 2015	1	0:26	Joinville, Brazil	
Win	6–0	Gabriela Bueno	Submission	MMA Total Combat 2	March 21, 2015	1	1:17	São Bento do Sul, Brazil	
Win	5–0	Marta Souza	KO (punch)	Aspera FC 15	February 1, 2015	1	2:36	Itapema, Brazil	
Win	4–0	Rachael Cummins	TKO (punches)	XFC International 6	September 27, 2014	1	4:28	São Paulo, Brazil	Return to Bantamweight.
Win	3–0	Geisyele Nascimento	KO (head kick)	University of Champions 1	July 5, 2014	1	0:30	Curitiba, Brazil	Flyweight debut.
Win	2–0	Kessiny Mara	TKO (punches)	Aspera FC 4	March 1, 2014	1	2:20	Itapema, Brazil	
Win	1–0	Josiane Nunes de Lima	Decision (unanimous)	Striker's House Cup 31	November 23, 2013	3	5:00	Curitiba, Brazil	Bantamweight debut.

== See also ==
- List of Dana White's Contender Series alumni
- List of female mixed martial artists
