= 2025 in Professional Fighters League =

Information
- Promotion: Professional Fighters League
- First date: January 25, 2025
- Last date: December 20, 2025

The year 2025 was the 7th year in the history of the Professional Fighters League (PFL), a mixed martial arts promotion based in the United States.

== Background ==
On January 7, 2025, PFL chairman Donn Davis announced that elbows will be legal in the promotion, after the PFL had banned elbows for the regular season and playoffs. Elbows were typically allowed in non-season and non-playoff fights only.

On January 9, 2025, it was announced that the 2025 season of PFL would no longer operate as a points-based tournament, but would rather be contested as a single-elimination tournament.

On January 15, 2025, PFL revealed that hold eight tournaments in 2025, confirming the $500,000 pay for each winner. In total, it will distribute more than $20 million to the fighters. The tournaments will take place at heavyweight, light heavyweight, middleweight, welterweight, lightweight, featherweight, bantamweight and women's flyweight divisions.

== Events list ==
#	Event	Date	Venue	Location	Ref.
1	PFL Champions Series 1: Nurmagomedov vs. Hughes	January 25, 2025	Coca-Cola Arena	Dubai, United Arab Emirates	
2	PFL 1: Jackson vs. Koreshkov	April 3, 2025	Universal Studios Florida	Orlando, Florida, U.S.	
3	PFL 2: Alves vs. Higo	April 11, 2025	Universal Studios Florida	Orlando, Florida, U.S.	
4	PFL 3: Kasanganay vs. Edwards	April 18, 2025	Universal Studios Florida	Orlando, Florida, U.S.	
5	PFL 4: Davis vs. Wilkinson	May 1, 2025	Universal Studios Florida	Orlando, Florida, U.S.	
6	PFL MENA 1: Path to Greatness	May 9, 2025	Onyx Arena	Jeddah, Saudi Arabia	
7	PFL Europe 1: Belfast	May 10, 2025	SSE Arena	Belfast, Northern Ireland	
8	PFL 5: Jackson vs Jean	June 12, 2025	Nashville Municipal Auditorium	Nashville, Tennessee, U.S.	
9	PFL 6: Rabadanov vs. Lee	June 20, 2025	Intrust Bank Arena	Wichita, Kansas, U.S.	
10	PFL 7: Edwards vs. Silveira	June 27, 2025	Wintrust Arena	Chicago, Illinois, U.S.	
11	PFL MENA 2: The Next Chapter	July 4, 2025	The Green Halls	Riyadh, Saudi Arabia	
12	PFL Europe 2: Brussels	July 5, 2025	ING Arena	Brussels, Belgium	
13	PFL Champions Series 2: Eblen vs. van Steenis	July 19, 2025	GrandWest Arena	Cape Town, South Africa	
14	PFL 8: Jean vs. Storley	August 1, 2025	Boardwalk Hall	Atlantic City, New Jersey, U.S.	
15	PFL Africa 2: Johannesburg	August 9, 2025	Big Top Arena	Johannesburg, South Africa	
16	PFL 9: Rabadanov vs. Davis	August 15, 2025	Bojangles Coliseum	Charlotte, North Carolina, U.S.	
17	PFL 10: Edwards vs. Rosta	August 21, 2025	Seminole Hard Rock Hotel & Casino Hollywood	Hollywood, Florida, U.S.	
18	PFL Europe 3: Nantes	September 26, 2025	Zénith Nantes Métropole	Nantes, France	
19	PFL MENA 3: Champions Collide	September 27, 2025	The Arena Riyadh Venue for Exhibitions	Riyadh, Saudi Arabia	
20	PFL Champions Series 3: Nurmagomedov vs. Hughes 2	October 3, 2025	Coca-Cola Arena	Dubai, United Arab Emirates	
21	PFL Africa 3: Ocheme vs. Sankara	October 18, 2025	BK Arena	Kigali, Rwanda	
22	PFL MENA 4 Finals: All or Nothing	December 5, 2025	Dhahran Expo	Khobar, Saudi Arabia	
23	PFL Champions Series 4: Nemkov vs Ferreira	December 13, 2025	LDLC Arena	Lyon, France	
24	PFL Africa Finals: Benin	December 20, 2025	Sofitel Dome	Cotonou, Benin	

== Title fights ==
Title fights in 2025
Weight class				Method	Round	Time	Event	Notes
Lightweight	Usman Nurmagomedov (c)	def.	Paul Hughes	Decision (majority) (47–47, 48–46, 48–46)	5	5:00	PFL Champions Series 1	(Note: For the Bellator Lightweight World Championship. Nurmagomedov was deducted 1 point in round 3 due to repeated groin kicks.)
Middleweight	Costello van Steenis	def.	Johnny Eblen	Technical Submission (rear-naked choke)	5	4:51	PFL Champions Series 2	(Note: For the PFL Middleweight World Championship.)
Light Heavyweight	Corey Anderson	def.	Dovletdzhan Yagshimuradov	Decision (unanimous) (49–45, 49–45, 48–47)	5	5:00	PFL Champions Series 3	(Note: For the PFL Light Heavyweight World Championship.)
Lightweight	Usman Nurmagomedov	def.	Paul Hughes	Decision (unanimous) (50–45, 49–46, 48–47)	5	5:00	PFL Champions Series 3	(Note: For the PFL Lightweight World Championship.)
Women's Featherweight	Cris Cyborg (c)	def.	Sara Collins	Submission (face crank)	3	2.55	PFL Champions Series 4	(Note: For the PFL Women's Featherweight World Championship.)
Heavyweight	Vadim Nemkov	def.	Renan Ferreira	Submission (arm-triangle choke)	1	4.00	PFL Champions Series 4	(Note: For the PFL Heavyweight World Championship.)

== 2025 PFL World Tournament ==
=== 2025 PFL Heavyweight Tournament ===
Quarter-finals
(Russia) Valentin Moldavsky	UD
(Russia) Sergey Bilostenniy	3
(Moldova) Alexander Romanov	SUB
(United States) Timothy Johnson	1
(England) Abraham Bably	3
(Brazil) Rodrigo Nascimento (Note: Pouya Rahmani withdrew from the tournament due to visa issues and was replaced by Rodrigo Nascimento.)	SD
(Russia) Oleg Popov	SD
(United States Virgin Islands) Karl Williams (Note: Linton Vassell withdrew from the tournament and was replaced by Karl Williams.)	3

Semi-finals
(Russia) Valentin Moldavsky	1
(Moldova) Alexander Romanov	NC
(Brazil) Rodrigo Nascimento	3
(Russia) Oleg Popov	UD

Final
(Moldova) Alexander Romanov	5
(Russia) Oleg Popov	SD

=== 2025 PFL Light Heavyweight Tournament ===
Quarter-finals
(United States) Phil Davis	TKO
(Australia) Rob Wilkinson	2
(United States) Alex Polizzi (Note: Marcelo Nunes withdrew from the tournament before event started and was replaced by Alex Polizzi.)	1
(United States) Sullivan Cauley	TKO
(Republic of Ireland) Karl Moore	3
(Brazil) Antônio Carlos Júnior	SD
(Sweden) Karl Albrektsson	2
(England) Simeon Powell	TKO

Semi-finals
(United States) Phil Davis	3
(United States) Sullivan Cauley	UD
(Brazil) Antônio Carlos Júnior	UD
(England) Simeon Powell	3

Final
(United States) Sullivan Cauley	2
(Brazil) Antônio Carlos Júnior	SUB

=== 2025 PFL Middleweight Tournament ===
Quarter-finals
(United States) Impa Kasanganay	1
(England) Fabian Edwards	TKO
(England) Mike Shipman	3
(United States) Josh Silveira	UD
(United States) Dalton Rosta	SUB
(Sweden) Sadibou Sy	2
(Canada) Aaron Jeffery	SD
(Russia) Murad Ramazanov	3

Semi-finals
(England) Fabian Edwards	UD
(United States) Josh Silveira	3
(United States) Dalton Rosta	SD
(Canada) Aaron Jeffery	3

Final
(England) Fabian Edwards	KO
(United States) Dalton Rosta	3

=== 2025 PFL Welterweight Tournament ===
Quarter-finals
(Jamaica) Jason Jackson	SUB
(Russia) Andrey Koreshkov	2
(Russia) Mukhamed Berkhamov	1
(Haiti) Thad Jean (Note: Florim Zendeli withdrew from the tournament for unknown reasons and was replaced by Thad Jean.)	KO
(Australia) Joseph Luciano (Note: Magomed Umalatov missed weight (173.6 lb) and he was removed from the tournament. Alternate fighter Joseph Luciano stepped in instead.)	3
(United States) Logan Storley	UD
(Greece) Giannis Bachar	2
(Japan) Masayuki Kikuiri	TKO

Semi-finals
(Jamaica) Jason Jackson	3
(Haiti) Thad Jean	SD
(United States) Logan Storley	UD
(Japan) Masayuki Kikuiri	3

Final
(Haiti) Thad Jean	UD
(United States) Logan Storley	5

=== 2025 PFL Lightweight Tournament ===
Quarter-finals
(Brazil) Vinicius Sacchelli Cenci (Note: Alexandr Shabliy withdrew from the tournament due to undisclosed reasons and was replaced by Vinicius Sacchelli Cenci.)	3
(United States) Brent Primus	SUB
(United States) Clay Collard	3
(England) Alfie Davis	UD
(Russia) Gadzhi Rabadanov	KO
(Democratic Republic of the Congo) Marc Diakiese	1
(New Zealand) Jay-Jay Wilson	TKO
(Denmark) Mads Burnell	3

Semi-finals
(United States) Brent Primus	3
(England) Alfie Davis	UD
(Russia) Gadzhi Rabadanov	TKO
(United States) Kevin Lee (Note: Jay-Jay Wilson withdrew from the tournament due to a jaw injury and was replaced by Kevin Lee.)	1

Final
(England) Alfie Davis	UD
(Russia) Gadzhi Rabadanov	5

=== 2025 PFL Featherweight Tournament ===
Quarter-finals
(Peru) Jesus Pinedo	TKO
(Hungary) Ádám Borics	1
(Brazil) Gabriel Braga	SUB
(Canada) Frederik Dupras (Note: Yves Landu withdrew from the tournament due to injury and was replaced by Frederik Dupras.)	1
(Canada) Jeremy Kennedy	3
(Russia) Movlid Khaybulaev	SD
(Republic of Ireland) Nathan Kelly	1
(South Korea) Kim Tae-kyun	SUB

Semi-finals
(Peru) Jesus Pinedo	TKO
(Brazil) Gabriel Braga	1
(Russia) Movlid Khaybulaev	UD
(South Korea) Kim Tae-kyun	3

Final
(Peru) Jesus Pinedo	5
(Russia) Movlid Khaybulaev (Note: Movlid Khaybulaev tested positive for recombinant human erythropoietin (rHuEPO, a synthetic form of EPO) on December 18, 2025. The PFL stripped him of his Featherweight tournament win (the result of the bout was not affected).)	SUB

=== 2025 PFL Bantamweight Tournament ===
Quarter-finals
(Brazil) Leandro Higo	3
(Brazil) Marcirley Alves (Note: Magomed Magomedov withdrew from the tournament due to injury and was replaced by Josh Rettinghouse. In turn, Rettinghouse was not medically cleared and replaced by Marcirley Alves)	SD
(England) Jake Hadley	SUB
(Brazil) Matheus Mattos (Note: Sarvarjon Khamidov withdrew from the tournament due to visa issues and was replaced by Matheus Mattos.)	3
(Russia) Kasum Kasumov	3
(United States) Justin Wetzell (Note: Ciaran Clarke withdrew from the tournament due to injury and was replaced by Justin Wetzell.)	UD
(Italy) Francesco Nuzzi	1
(Mexico) Mando Gutierrez (Note: Ali Taleb and Zebenzui Ruiz withdrew from the tournament due to visa issues and were replaced by Francesco Nuzzi and Mando Gutierrez.)	SUB

Semi-finals
(Brazil) Marcirley Alves	UD
(England) Jake Hadley	3
(United States) Justin Wetzell	UD
(Mexico) Mando Gutierrez	3

Final
(Brazil) Marcirley Alves	UD
(United States) Justin Wetzell	5

=== 2025 PFL Women's Flyweight Tournament ===
Quarter-finals
(Brazil) Juliana Velasquez	1
(Ukraine) Ekaterina Shakalova (Note: Taila Santos withdrew from the tournament and was replaced by Ekaterina Shakalova.)	SUB
(Japan) Kana Watanabe	3
(United States) Jena Bishop	UD
(United States) Liz Carmouche	TKO
(Brazil) Ilara Joanne	1
(Brazil) Elora Dana	SUB
(Russia) Diana Avsaragova	1

Semi-finals
(Ukraine) Ekaterina Shakalova	2
(United States) Jena Bishop	SUB
(United States) Liz Carmouche	UD
(Brazil) Elora Dana	3

Final
(United States) Jena Bishop	3
(United States) Liz Carmouche	KO

== 2025 PFL Africa Tournament ==
=== 2025 PFL Africa Heavyweight Tournament ===
Quarter-finals
(Ivory Coast) Paul-Emmanuel Gnaze (Note: Badr Medkouri withdrew from the tournament and was replaced by Paul-Emmanuel Gnaze.)	1
(Ivory Coast) Abraham Bably	KO
(Nigeria) Joffie Houlton (Note: Mohammad Ben Yahia withdrew from the tournament due to an injury and was replaced by Joffie Houlton.)	DQ
(Senegal) Abdoullah Kane	1
(South Africa) Justin Clarke	TKO
(Cameroon) Jashell Ticha Awa	1
(Cameroon) Maxwell Djantou Nana	UD
(Ivory Coast) Mickaël Groguhe	3

Semi-finals
(Ivory Coast) Abraham Bably	TKO
(Nigeria) Joffie Houlton	1
(Cameroon) Maxwell Djantou Nana	3
(South Africa) Justin Clarke	TKO

Final
(Ivory Coast) Abraham Bably	KO
(South Africa) Justin Clarke	1

=== 2025 PFL Africa Welterweight Tournament ===
Quarter-finals
(Angola) Shido Boris Esperanca	SUB
(The Gambia) Ibrahima Mané	1
(Democratic Republic of the Congo) British Boloyoang	1
(Cameroon) Ayinda Octave	TKO
(Burkina Faso) Sanon Sadeck	3
(Guinea-Bissau) Yabna N'Tchalá	UD
(Angola) Osvaldo Benedito	1
(Cameroon) Emilios Dassi	KO

Semi-finals
(Angola) Shido Boris Esperanca	SUB
(Cameroon) Ayinda Octave	1
(Guinea-Bissau) Yabna N'Tchalá	UD
(Cameroon) Emilios Dassi	3

Final
(Angola) Shido Boris Esperanca	2
(Guinea-Bissau) Yabna N'Tchalá	TKO

=== 2025 PFL Africa Featherweight Tournament ===
Quarter-finals
(Nigeria) Patrick Ocheme	DEC
(Guinea) Mohamed Camara	3
(Burkina Faso) Abdul Razak Sankara	KO
(Democratic Republic of the Congo) Shadrick Dju Yemba (Note: The bout was originally scheduled as Abderrahman Errachidy vs. Elbert Lukas Steyn, but both fighters missed weight and were replaced by alternate bout between Abdul Razak Sankara vs. Shadrick Dju Yemba.)	1
(Nigeria) Wasi Adeshina	SUB
(Democratic Republic of the Congo) Jean-Jacques Lubaya	2
(Angola) Wilker Nsamo	2
(Liberia) Dwight Joseph	KO

Semi-finals
(Guinea) Mohamed Camara	3
(Cameroon) Alain Majorique (Note: The bout was originally scheduled as Patrick Ocheme vs. Abdul Razak Sankara, but both fighters missed weight and were replaced by alternate bout between Mohamed Camara vs. Alain Majorique.)	UD
(Nigeria) Wasi Adeshina	UD
(Liberia) Dwight Joseph	3

Final
(Cameroon) Alain Majorique	2
(Nigeria) Wasi Adeshina	TKO

=== 2025 PFL Africa Bantamweight Tournament ===
Quarter-finals
(South Africa) Nkosi Ndebele	TKO
(Egypt) Mahmoud Atef	1
(South Africa) Frans Mlambo (Note: Alain Majorique withdrew from the tournament and was replaced by Frans Mlambo.)	3
(Zimbabwe) Simbarashe Hokonya	UD
(South Africa) Shannon van Tonder	3
(Angola) Boule Godogo	SD
(South Africa) Asiashu Tshitamba (Note: Antero dos Santos withdrew from the tournament and was replaced by Asiashu Tshitamba.)	3
(Algeria) Karim Henniene	SD

Semi-finals
(South Africa) Nkosi Ndebele	SD
(Zimbabwe) Simbarashe Hokonya	3
(Angola) Boule Godogo	3
(Algeria) Karim Henniene	KO

Final
(South Africa) Nkosi Ndebele	TKO
(Angola) Boule Godogo (Note: Karim Henniene withdrew from the tournament and was replaced by Boule Godogo.)	2

== 2025 PFL Europe Tournament ==
=== 2025 PFL Europe Lightweight Tournament ===
Quarter-finals
(England) Connor Hughes	KO
(Belgium) Sebastien Di Franco	1
(Republic of Ireland) Decky McAleenan	3
(Spain) Gino van Steenis	UD
(England) Gavin Hughes	3
(Italy) Claudio Pacella	UD
(Scotland) Mark Ewen	1
(Latvia) Aleksandr Chizov	TKO

Semi-finals
(England) Connor Hughes	KO
(Spain) Gino van Steenis	1
(Italy) Claudio Pacella	3
(Latvia) Aleksandr Chizov	SD

Final
(England) Connor Hughes	3
(Latvia) Aleksandr Chizov	KO

=== 2025 PFL Europe Bantamweight Tournament ===
Quarter-finals
(France) Mahio Campanella	UD
(Latvia) Matiss Zaharovs	3
(France) Anas Azizoun	1
(Portugal) Gustavo Oliveira	KO
(England) Dean Garnett	UD
(Finland) Tuomas Grönvall (Note: Alexander Luster withdrew from the tournament due to an injury and was replaced by Tuomas Grönvall.)	3
(Poland) Jan Ciepłowski	TKO
(France) Julien Lopez	1

Semi-finals
(France) Baris Adiguzel (Note: Mahio Campanella withdrew from the tournament and was replaced by Baris Adiguzel.)	KO
(France) Julien Lopez (Note: Gustavo Oliveira was forced to withdraw due to a cut sustained in training and was replaced by Julien Lopez.)	1
(England) Dean Garnett	SUB
(Poland) Jan Ciepłowski	3

Final
(France) Baris Adiguzel	TKO
(England) Dean Garnett	1

== 2025 PFL MENA Tournament ==
=== 2025 PFL MENA Welterweight Tournament ===
Quarter-finals
(Palestine) Omar Hussein	3
(Kuwait) Mohammad Alaqraa	UD
(Iraq) Mohamed Zarey	UD
(Egypt) Ayman Galal	3
(Morocco) Badreddine Diani	UD
(Egypt) Ahmad Abdelbast Darwish	3
(Turkey) Rostem Akman	2
(Iran) Amir Fazli	KO

Semi-finals
(Kuwait) Mohammad Alaqraa	TKO
(Iraq) Mohamed Zarey	1
(Morocco) Badreddine Diani	SD
(Iran) Amir Fazli	3

Final
(Kuwait) Mohammad Alaqraa	UD
(Morocco) Badreddine Diani	3

=== 2025 PFL MENA Lightweight Tournament ===
Quarter-finals
(Iran) Mohsen Mohammadseifi	UD
(Egypt) Ahmed El Sisy	3
(Lebanon) Georges Eid	1
(Iraq) Mohammad Fahmi	SUB
(Morocco) Salah Eddine Hamli	SUB
(Bahrain) Abbas Khan	3
(Kuwait) Abdullah Saleem	TKO
(Algeria) Souhil Taïri	2

Semi-finals
(Iran) Mohsen Mohammadseifi	1
(Iraq) Mohammad Fahmi	SUB
(Morocco) Salah Eddine Hamli	SUB
(Algeria) Souhil Taïri	3

Final
(Iraq) Mohammad Fahmi	2
(Morocco) Salah Eddine Hamli	SUB

=== 2025 PFL MENA Featherweight Tournament ===
Quarter-finals
(Algeria) Akram Nasri (Note: Abdullah Al-Qahtani withdrew from the tournament due to injury and was replaced by Akram Nasri.)	3
(Egypt) Islam Reda	SUB
(Algeria) Drissi Boualem (Note: Abdelrahman Alhyasat withdrew from the tournament due to weight cut issues and was replaced by Drissi Boualem.)	1
(Morocco) Taha Bendaoud	SUB
(Jordan) Izzeddine Al-Derbani	–
(Algeria) Yanis Ghemmouri	BYE (Note: Al Derbani pulled out of the bout due to medical issues and Ghemmouri therefore got a bye to the semi-finals.)
(Iraq) Hussein Salem	3
(Egypt) Assem Ghanem	UD

Semi-finals
(Egypt) Islam Reda	UD
(Morocco) Taha Bendaoud	3
(Algeria) Yanis Ghemmouri	UD
(Egypt) Assem Ghanem	3

Final
(Egypt) Islam Reda	SUB
(Algeria) Yanis Ghemmouri	2

=== 2025 PFL MENA Bantamweight Tournament ===
Quarter-finals
(Morocco) Xavier Alaoui	UD
(Egypt) Ziad Ayman Mokhtar	3
(Iran) Benyamin Ghahraman (Note: Elias Boudegzdame withdrew from the tournament and was replaced by Benyamin Ghahraman.)	2
(Egypt) Islam Youssef (Note: Tariq Ismail withdrew from the tournament due to injury and was replaced by Mehdi Saadi. In turn, Saadi withdrew from the event due to significantly missing weight and was replaced by alternate Islam Youssef.)	KO
(Algeria) Moktar Benkaci	TKO
(Lebanon) Marcel Adur	1
(Jordan) Nawras Abzakh	KO
(Lebanon) Ali Yazbeck	2

Semi-finals
(Morocco) Xavier Alaoui	3
(Egypt) Islam Youssef	UD
(Algeria) Moktar Benkaci	3
(Jordan) Nawras Abzakh	UD

Final
(Egypt) Islam Youssef	1
(Jordan) Nawras Abzakh	SUB

== See also ==
- List of current PFL fighters
- 2025 in UFC
- 2025 in ONE Championship
- 2025 in Absolute Championship Akhmat
- 2025 in Konfrontacja Sztuk Walki
- 2025 in Legacy Fighting Alliance
- 2025 in Rizin Fighting Federation
- 2025 in LUX Fight League
- 2025 in Oktagon MMA
- 2025 in Brave Combat Federation
- 2025 in Cage Warriors
- 2025 in UAE Warriors
