= 2019 in Professional Fighters League =

- Genre: Sports
- Country of origin: United States

Original release
- Network: ESPN
- Release: May 9 – December 31, 2019

This is a list of events and standings for the Professional Fighters League, a mixed martial arts organization based in the United States, for the 2019 season.

Each weight class had 12 fighters, except the women's class which had 8 fighters. Each fighter faced two rivals in the regular season. The top fighters in each weight class (8 in the men's classes, 4 in the women's class) qualified to the playoffs. The season concluded on December 31, 2019 with six championship bouts back-to-back with a $10 million prize pool.

== 2019 world champions ==
Division	Upper weight limit	Champion	Date
Heavyweight	265 lb (120 kg; 18.9 st)	Ali Isayev	December 31, 2019 (PFL 10)
Light Heavyweight	205 lb (93 kg; 14.6 st)	Emiliano Sordi	December 31, 2019 (PFL 10)
Welterweight	170 lb (77 kg; 12 st)	Ray Cooper III	December 31, 2019 (PFL 10)
Lightweight	155 lb (70 kg; 11.1 st)	Natan Schulte	December 31, 2019 (PFL 10)
Women's Lightweight	155 lb (70 kg; 11.1 st)	Kayla Harrison	December 31, 2019 (PFL 10)
Featherweight	145 lb (66 kg; 10.5 st)	Lance Palmer	December 31, 2019 (PFL 10)

== Events ==
#	Event	Date	Venue	Location
10	PFL 10	December 31, 2019	Hulu Theater at Madison Square Garden	New York City, New York, U.S.
9	PFL 9	October 31, 2019	Mandalay Bay	Las Vegas, Nevada, U.S.
8	PFL 8	October 17, 2019	Mandalay Bay	Las Vegas, Nevada, U.S.
7	PFL 7	October 11, 2019	Mandalay Bay	Las Vegas, Nevada, U.S.
6	PFL 6	August 8, 2019	Ocean Resort Casino	Atlantic City, New Jersey, U.S.
5	PFL 5	July 25, 2019	Ocean Resort Casino	Atlantic City, New Jersey, U.S.
4	PFL 4	July 11, 2019	Ocean Resort Casino	Atlantic City, New Jersey, U.S.
3	PFL 3	June 6, 2019	Nassau Coliseum	Uniondale, New York, U.S.
2	PFL 2	May 23, 2019	Nassau Coliseum	Uniondale, New York, U.S.
1	PFL 1	May 9, 2019	Nassau Coliseum	Uniondale, New York, U.S.

== 2019 PFL Heavyweight playoffs ==
Quarterfinals
1	(Russia) Denis Goltsov	MD 2
8	(Croatia) Satoshi Ishii	L
4	(United States) Kelvin Tiller	L
5	(Russia) Ali Isaev	UD 2
2	(United States) Muhammed Dereese	L
7	(United States) Jared Rosholt	TKO 1
3	(United States) Alex Nicholson	L
6	(Brazil) Francimar Barroso	UD 2

Semifinals
1	(Russia) Denis Goltsov	L
5	(Russia) Ali Isaev	TKO 3
7	(United States) Jared Rosholt	UD 3
4	(United States) Kelvin Tiller*	L

Finals
5	(Russia) Ali Isaev	TKO 4
7	(United States) Jared Rosholt	L

* Francimar Barroso was forced to withdraw from the competition due to being ruled “not healthy enough to continue.” Alex Nicholson was selected to take his spot in the heavyweight semifinals, but was also later ruled unfit to compete. Kelvin Tiller was eventually chosen to return to the competition to face Jared Rosholt.

Legend
(SD)	(Split decision)
(UD)	(Unanimous decision)
(MD)	(Majority decision)
SUB	Submission
(T)KO	(Technical) knock out
L	Loss

== 2019 PFL Light Heavyweight playoffs ==
Quarterfinals
1	(Argentina) Emiliano Sordi	TKO 1
8	(New Zealand) Sigi Pesaleli	L
4	(Russia) Bazigit Atajev	Draw 2
5	(Russia) Viktor Nemkov	L
2	(Russia) Maxim Grishin	L
7	(United States) Jordan Johnson	Draw 2
3	(Brazil) Vinny Magalhães	L
6	(Russia) Rashid Yusupov	KO 1

Semifinals
1	(Argentina) Emiliano Sordi	SUB 1
4	(Russia) Bazigit Atajev	L
7	(United States) Jordan Johnson	UD 3
6	(Russia) Rashid Yusupov	L

Finals
1	(Argentina) Emiliano Sordi	TKO 1
7	(United States) Jordan Johnson	L

Legend
(SD)	(Split decision)
(UD)	(Unanimous decision)
(MD)	(Majority decision)
SUB	Submission
(T)KO	(Technical) knock out
L	Loss

== 2019 PFL Welterweight playoffs ==
Quarterfinals
1	(Brazil) Glaico França	MD 2
8	(Portugal) André Fialho	L
4	(United States) John Howard	L
5	(United States) David Michaud	UD 2
2	(Russia) Magomed Magomedkerimov	UD 2
7	(United States) Chris Curtis	L
3	(Sweden) Sadibou Sy	L
6	(United States) Ray Cooper III	Draw 2

Semifinals
1	(Brazil) Glaico França
5	(United States) David Michaud	MD 3
7	(United States) Chris Curtis*	L
6	(United States) Ray Cooper III	KO 2

Finals
5	(United States) David Michaud	L
6	(United States) Ray Cooper III	TKO 2

*Magomed Magomedkerimov was originally scheduled to face Ray Cooper III but was unable to continue in the tournament. He was replaced by his quarterfinal opponent, Chris Curtis.

Legend
(SD)	(Split decision)
(UD)	(Unanimous decision)
(MD)	(Majority decision)
SUB	Submission
(T)KO	(Technical) knock out
L	Loss

== 2019 PFL Lightweight playoffs ==
Quarterfinals
1	(Brazil) Natan Schulte	SUB 1
8	(United States) Ramsey Nijem	L
4	(Russia) Akhmet Aliev	UD 2
5	(Russia) Rashid Magomedov	L
2	(Russia) Islam Mamedov	L
7	(Tajikistan) Loik Radzhabov	Draw 2
3	(United States) Chris Wade	MD 2
6	(United States) Nate Andrews	L

Semifinals
1	(Brazil) Natan Schulte	SUB 2
4	(Russia) Akhmet Aliev	L
7	(Tajikistan) Loik Radzhabov	UD 3
3	(United States) Chris Wade	L

Finals
1	(Brazil) Natan Schulte	UD 5
7	(Tajikistan) Loik Radzhabov	L

Legend
(SD)	(Split decision)
(UD)	(Unanimous decision)
(MD)	(Majority decision)
SUB	Submission
(T)KO	(Technical) knock out
L	Loss

== 2019 PFL Women's Lightweight playoffs ==
Semifinals
1	(Canada) Sarah Kaufman	L
4	(Brazil) Larissa Pacheco	UD 3
2	(United States) Kayla Harrison	SUB 1
5	(Canada) Bobbi Jo Dalziel*	L

Finals
4	(Brazil) Larissa Pacheco	L
2	(United States) Kayla Harrison	UD 5

* Genah Fabian was originally scheduled to face Kayla Harrison but was forced to pull out of the bout. She was replaced by Bobbi Jo Dalziel.

Legend
(SD)	(Split decision)
(UD)	(Unanimous decision)
(MD)	(Majority decision)
SUB	Submission
(T)KO	(Technical) knock out
L	Loss

== 2019 PFL Featherweight playoffs ==
Quarterfinals
1	(United States) Lance Palmer	UD 2
9	(Brazil) Alexandre de Almeida	L
4	(United States) Alex Gilpin	SUB 2
5	(United States) Andre Harrison	L
2	(Russia) Movlid Khaybulaev	L
7	(United States) Daniel Pineda	KO 1
3	(Brazil) Luis Rafael Laurentino	L
6	(Canada) Jeremy Kennedy	TKO 2

Semifinals
1	(United States) Lance Palmer	UD 3
4	(United States) Alex Gilpin	L
7	(United States) Daniel Pineda	SUB 1
6	(Canada) Jeremy Kennedy	L

Finals
1	(United States) Lance Palmer	UD 5
4	(United States) Alex Gilpin	L

*Daniel Pineda was originally scheduled to face Lance Palmer but was forced to pull out of the bout after failing NAC drug test. He was replaced by Alex Gilpin.

Legend
(SD)	(Split decision)
(UD)	(Unanimous decision)
(MD)	(Majority decision)
SUB	Submission
(T)KO	(Technical) knock out
L	Loss

== Standings ==
The PFL points system is based on results of the match. The winner of a fight receives 3 points. If the fight ends in a draw, both fighters will receive 1 point. The bonus for winning a fight in the first, second, or third round is 3 points, 2 points, and 1 point respectively. The bonus for winning in the third round requires a fight be stopped before 4:59 of the third round. No bonus point will be awarded if a fighter wins via decision. For example, if a fighter wins a fight in the first round, then the fighter will receive 6 total points. A decision win will result in three total points. If a fighter misses weight, the opponent (should they comply with weight limits) will receive 3 points due to a walkover victory, regardless of winning or losing the bout; if the non-offending fighter subsequently wins with a stoppage, all bonus points will be awarded.

=== Heavyweight ===
Fighter	Wins	Draws	Losses	1st	2nd	3rd	Total points (Note: The eight fighters with most points advance to the playoffs)
♛ Denis Goltsov	2	0	0	1	1	0	11
♛ Muhammed Dereese	1	0	1	1	0	0	6
♛ Alex Nicholson	1	0	1	1	0	0	6
♛ Kelvin Tiller	1	0	1	1	0	0	6
♛ Ali Isayev	2	0	0	0	0	0	6
♛ Francimar Barroso	2	0	0	0	0	0	6
♛ Jared Rosholt	1	0	1	0	0	0	3
♛ Satoshi Ishii	1	0	1	0	0	0	3
E Ante Delija	1	0	0	0	0	0	3
E Carl Seumanutafa	0	0	2	0	0	0	0
E Zeke Tuinei-Wily	0	0	2	0	0	0	0
E Valdrin Istrefi	0	0	2	0	0	0	0
E Ben Edwards	0	0	1	0	0	0	0

=== Light Heavyweight ===
Fighter	Wins	Draws	Losses	1st	2nd	3rd	Total points (Note: The eight fighters with most points advance to the playoffs)
♛ Emiliano Sordi	2	0	0	1	1	0	11
♛ Maxim Grishin	2	0	0	1	0	0	9
♛ Vinny Magalhães	1	0	1	1	0	0	6
♛ Bazigit Atajev	1	0	1	1	0	0	6
♛ Viktor Nemkov	2	0	0	0	0	0	3
♛ Rashid Yusupov	1	0	1	0	0	0	3
♛ Jordan Johnson	1	0	1	0	0	0	3
♛ Sigi Pesaleli	1	0	1	0	0	0	3
E Dan Spohn	1	0	1	0	0	0	3
E Rakim Cleveland	0	0	2	0	0	0	0
E Mikhail Mokhnatkin	0	0	2	0	0	0	0
E Ronny Markes	0	0	2	0	0	0	0

=== Welterweight ===
Fighter	Wins	Draws	Losses	1st	2nd	3rd	Total points (Note: The eight fighters with most points advance to the playoffs)
♛ Glaico Franca	2	0	0	1	0	1	10
♛ Magomed Magomedkerimov	2	0	0	1	0	0	9
♛ Sadibou Sy	1	0	1	1	0	0	6
♛ John Howard	1	0	1	1	0	0	6
♛ David Michaud	1	0	1	1	0	0	6
♛ Ray Cooper III	1	0	1	0	1	0	5
♛ Chris Curtis	1	0	1	0	0	1	4
♛ André Fialho	1	0	1	0	0	0	3
E Handesson Ferreira	1	0	1	0	0	0	3
E João Zeferino	1	0	0	0	0	0	3
E Bojan Veličković	0	0	2	0	0	0	0
E Zane Kamaka	0	0	2	0	0	0	0

=== Lightweight ===
Fighter	Wins	Draws	Losses	1st	2nd	3rd	Total points (Note: The eight fighters with most points advance to the playoffs)
♛ Natan Schulte	2	0	0	1	0	0	9
♛ Islam Mamedov	2	0	0	1	0	0	9
♛ Chris Wade	2	0	0	0	0	0	6
♛ Akhmet Aliev	1	0	1	1	0	0	6
♛ Rashid Magomedov	1	0	0	0	0	0	3
♛ Nate Andrews	1	0	1	0	0	0	3
♛ Loik Radzhabov	1	0	1	0	0	0	3
♛ Ramsey Nijem	1	0	1	0	0	0	3
E Ylies Djiroun	0	0	2	0	0	0	0
E Yincang Bao	0	0	2	0	0	0	0
E Jesse Ronson	0	0	1	0	0	0	0
E Carlos Silva	0	0	2	0	0	0	0

=== Women's Lightweight ===
Fighter	Wins	Draws	Losses	1st	2nd	3rd	Total Points (Note: The four fighters with most points advance to the playoffs)
♛ Sarah Kaufman	2	0	0	1	0	0	9
♛ Kayla Harrison	2	0	0	1	0	0	9
♛ Genah Fabian	1	0	1	1	0	0	6
♛ Larissa Pacheco	1	0	1	1	0	0	6
E Bobbi-Jo Dalziel	1	0	0	0	0	0	3
E Roberta Samad	1	0	1	0	0	0	3
E Moriel Charneski	0	0	2	0	0	0	0
E Morgan Frier	0	0	2	0	0	0	0

=== Featherweight ===
Fighter	Wins	Draws	Losses	1st	2nd	3rd	Total points (Note: The eight fighters with most points advance to the playoffs)
♛ Lance Palmer	2	0	0	0	0	0	7
♛ Movlid Khaybulaev	1	1	0	1	0	0	7
♛ Luis Rafael Laurentino	1	0	1	1	0	0	6
♛ Alex Gilpin	1	0	1	1	0	0	6
♛ Andre Harrison	1	1	0	0	0	0	4
♛Jeremy Kennedy	1	0	1	0	0	0	3
♛ Daniel Pineda	1	0	0	0	0	0	3
♛ Gadzhi Rabadanov	1	0	1	0	0	0	3
E Alexandre de Almeida	1	0	1	0	0	0	3
E Freddy Assunção	0	0	1	0	0	0	0
E Steven Siler	0	0	2	0	0	0	0
E Peter Petties	0	0	2	0	0	0	0

♛ = Clinched playoff spot --- E = Eliminated

== See also ==
- List of PFL events
- List of current PFL fighters
