= PFL 10 (2019) =

Professional Fighters League MMA event in 2019

- The poster for PFL 10
- Promotion: Professional Fighters League
- Date: December 31, 2019
- Venue: Hulu Theater at Madison Square Garden
- City: New York City, New York, U.S.

Event chronology
PFL 9	PFL 10	PFL 1

The PFL 10 mixed martial arts event for the 2019 season of the Professional Fighters League, the 2019 PFL Championship, was held on December 31, 2019, at the Hulu Theater at Madison Square Garden in New York City, New York.

== Background ==
The event was the tenth and final event of the 2019 season. Each champion in the six weight classes was crowned and won a championship prize of $1 million.

== Results ==
Main Card (ESPN2)
Weight class				Method	Round	Time	Notes
Women's Lightweight	Kayla Harrison	def.	Larissa Pacheco	Decision (unanimous) (50-43, 50-45, 50-45)	5	5:00	(Note: For the 2019 PFL Women's Lightweight Championship.)
Welterweight	Ray Cooper III	def.	David Michaud	TKO (punches)	2	2:56	(Note: For the 2019 PFL Welterweight Championship.)
Heavyweight	Ali Isaev	def.	Jared Rosholt	TKO (punches)	4	4:09	(Note: For the 2019 PFL Heavyweight Championship.)
Lightweight	Natan Schulte	def.	Loik Radzhabov	Decision (unanimous) (49-44, 49-46, 48-47)	5	5:00	(Note: For the 2019 PFL Lightweight Championship.)
Featherweight	Lance Palmer	def.	Alex Gilpin	Decision (unanimous) (50-43, 50-44, 50-44)	5	5:00	(Note: For the 2019 PFL Featherweight Championship.)
Light Heavyweight	Emiliano Sordi	def.	Jordan Johnson	TKO (punches)	1	2:01	(Note: For the 2019 PFL Light Heavyweight Championship.)
Preliminary Card (ESPN+)
Featherweight	Brendan Loughnane	def.	David Valente	Decision (unanimous) (30-27, 30-27, 30-27)	3	5:00

== 2019 PFL Heavyweight playoffs ==
Quarterfinals
1	(Russia) Denis Goltsov	MD 2
8	(Croatia) Satoshi Ishii	L
4	(United States) Kelvin Tiller	L
5	(Russia) Ali Isaev	UD 2
2	(United States) Muhammed Dereese	L
7	(United States) Jared Rosholt	TKO 1
3	(United States) Alex Nicholson	L
6	(Brazil) Francimar Barroso	UD 2

Semifinals
1	(Russia) Denis Goltsov	L
5	(Russia) Ali Isaev	TKO 3
7	(United States) Jared Rosholt	UD 3
4	(United States) Kelvin Tiller*	L

Finals
5	(Russia) Ali Isaev	TKO 4
7	(United States) Jared Rosholt	L

* Francimar Barroso was forced to withdraw from the competition due to being ruled “not healthy enough to continue.” Alex Nicholson was selected to take his spot in the heavyweight semifinals, but was also later ruled unfit to compete. Kelvin Tiller was eventually chosen to return to the competition to face Jared Rosholt.

Legend
(SD)	(Split decision)
(UD)	(Unanimous decision)
(MD)	(Majority decision)
SUB	Submission
(T)KO	(Technical) knock out
L	Loss

== 2019 PFL Light Heavyweight playoffs ==
Quarterfinals
1	(Argentina) Emiliano Sordi	TKO 1
8	(New Zealand) Sigi Pesaleli	L
4	(Russia) Bazigit Atajev	Draw 2
5	(Russia) Viktor Nemkov	L
2	(Russia) Maxim Grishin	L
7	(United States) Jordan Johnson	Draw 2
3	(Brazil) Vinny Magalhães	L
6	(Russia) Rashid Yusupov	KO 1

Semifinals
1	(Argentina) Emiliano Sordi	SUB 1
4	(Russia) Bazigit Atajev	L
7	(United States) Jordan Johnson	UD 3
6	(Russia) Rashid Yusupov	L

Finals
1	(Argentina) Emiliano Sordi	TKO 1
7	(United States) Jordan Johnson	L

Legend
(SD)	(Split decision)
(UD)	(Unanimous decision)
(MD)	(Majority decision)
SUB	Submission
(T)KO	(Technical) knock out
L	Loss

== 2019 PFL Welterweight playoffs ==
Quarterfinals
1	(Brazil) Glaico França	MD 2
8	(Portugal) André Fialho	L
4	(United States) John Howard	L
5	(United States) David Michaud	UD 2
2	(Russia) Magomed Magomedkerimov	UD 2
7	(United States) Chris Curtis	L
3	(Sweden) Sadibou Sy	L
6	(United States) Ray Cooper III	Draw 2

Semifinals
1	(Brazil) Glaico França
5	(United States) David Michaud	MD 3
7	(United States) Chris Curtis*	L
6	(United States) Ray Cooper III	KO 2

Finals
5	(United States) David Michaud	L
6	(United States) Ray Cooper III	TKO 2

*Magomed Magomedkerimov was originally scheduled to face Ray Cooper III but was unable to continue in the tournament. He was replaced by his quarterfinal opponent, Chris Curtis.

Legend
(SD)	(Split decision)
(UD)	(Unanimous decision)
(MD)	(Majority decision)
SUB	Submission
(T)KO	(Technical) knock out
L	Loss

== 2019 PFL Lightweight playoffs ==
Quarterfinals
1	(Brazil) Natan Schulte	SUB 1
8	(United States) Ramsey Nijem	L
4	(Russia) Akhmet Aliev	UD 2
5	(Russia) Rashid Magomedov	L
2	(Russia) Islam Mamedov	L
7	(Tajikistan) Loik Radzhabov	Draw 2
3	(United States) Chris Wade	MD 2
6	(United States) Nate Andrews	L

Semifinals
1	(Brazil) Natan Schulte	SUB 2
4	(Russia) Akhmet Aliev	L
7	(Tajikistan) Loik Radzhabov	UD 3
3	(United States) Chris Wade	L

Finals
1	(Brazil) Natan Schulte	UD 5
7	(Tajikistan) Loik Radzhabov	L

Legend
(SD)	(Split decision)
(UD)	(Unanimous decision)
(MD)	(Majority decision)
SUB	Submission
(T)KO	(Technical) knock out
L	Loss

== 2019 PFL Featherweight playoffs ==
Quarterfinals
1	(United States) Lance Palmer	UD 2
9	(Brazil) Alexandre de Almeida	L
4	(United States) Alex Gilpin	SUB 2
5	(United States) Andre Harrison	L
2	(Russia) Movlid Khaybulaev	L
7	(United States) Daniel Pineda	KO 1
3	(Brazil) Luis Rafael Laurentino	L
6	(Canada) Jeremy Kennedy	TKO 2

Semifinals
1	(United States) Lance Palmer	UD 3
4	(United States) Alex Gilpin	L
7	(United States) Daniel Pineda	SUB 1
6	(Canada) Jeremy Kennedy	L

Finals
1	(United States) Lance Palmer	UD 5
4	(United States) Alex Gilpin	L

*Daniel Pineda was originally scheduled to face Lance Palmer but was forced to pull out of the bout after failing NAC drug test. He was replaced by Alex Gilpin.

Legend
(SD)	(Split decision)
(UD)	(Unanimous decision)
(MD)	(Majority decision)
SUB	Submission
(T)KO	(Technical) knock out
L	Loss

== 2019 PFL Women's Lightweight playoffs ==
Semifinals
1	(Canada) Sarah Kaufman	L
4	(Brazil) Larissa Pacheco	UD 3
2	(United States) Kayla Harrison	SUB 1
5	(Canada) Bobbi Jo Dalziel*	L

Finals
4	(Brazil) Larissa Pacheco	L
2	(United States) Kayla Harrison	UD 5

* Genah Fabian was originally scheduled to face Kayla Harrison but was forced to pull out of the bout. She was replaced by Bobbi Jo Dalziel.

Legend
(SD)	(Split decision)
(UD)	(Unanimous decision)
(MD)	(Majority decision)
SUB	Submission
(T)KO	(Technical) knock out
L	Loss

== See also ==
- List of PFL events
- List of current PFL fighters
