= Ali Isaev =

Azerbaijani-Russian mixed martial artist

Ali Isaev Али Исаев
- Born: Ali Isaevich Isaev; December 18, 1983 (age 42); Makhachkala, Dagestan ASSR, Russian SFSR, Soviet Union
- Nationality: Azerbaijani; Russian
- Height: 6 ft 3 in (1.91 m)
- Weight: 265 lb (120 kg; 18.9 st)
- Division: Heavyweight
- Reach: 78 in (198 cm)
- Style: Freestyle wrestling
- Fighting out of: Makhachkala, Dagestan, Russia
- Team: Gamid Gamidov WC.
- Trainer: Shmail Omarov
- Rank: International Master of Sports in Freestyle wrestling
- Years active: 2016–present

Mixed martial arts record
- Total: 10
- Wins: 9
- By knockout: 4
- By decision: 5
- Draws: 1

Other information
- Mixed martial arts record from Sherdog

Ali Isaevich Isaev (Russian: Али Исаевич Исаев; born 18 December 1983) is a Russian-Azerbaijani professional mixed martial artist and former amateur wrestler who competed in the Heavyweight division. He has also formerly competed for Bellator MMA, Fight Nights Global and Professional Fighters League (PFL), where he was the 2019 Heavyweight Tournament Champion. He competed at the 2008 Summer Olympics in men's freestyle wrestling at 125 kilos where Isaev placed 17th.

== Mixed martial arts career ==
=== Early career ===
Ali Isaev was born to a Dargin family on 18 December 1983 in the city Makhatchkala. Isaev is a Freestyle wrestling European champion. He made his professional MMA debut in April 2016. He fought his first four fights exclusively for Fight Nights Global and went undefeated with two decision wins and two knockout wins.

=== Professional Fighters League ===
==== PFL season 2019 ====
In the summer of 2019, Isaev began competing in the Heavyweight division of the Professional Fighters League. In his debut, he defeated Valdrin Istrefi by unanimous decision at PFL 3 on June 6, 2019. In his second fight for the promotion, Isayev defeated Carl Seumanutafa also by unanimous decision at PFL 6 on August 8, 2019.

On October 31, 2019, he fought twice in one night in the 2019 PFL Heavyweight tournament. He defeated Kelvin Tiller by decision and Denis Goltsov by TKO in the quarterfinal and semifinal bouts, respectively. He faced Jared Rosholt in the finals at PFL 10 on December 31, 2019. Isayev won the fight via TKO in the fourth round to claim the 2019 Heavyweight Championship.

==== PFL season 2021 ====
Isaev was scheduled to face promotional newcomer Hatef Moeil on May 6, 2021, at PFL 3. However, during the week of the event, it was announced that the bout was pulled for unknown reasons and would be rescheduled for June.

Isaev was scheduled to face Renan Ferreira on June 25, 2021, at PFL 6. Isaev was forced to withdraw from the event after not being medically cleared to compete. Stepping in for Isaev to fight Renan Ferreira was PFL newcomer Stuart Austin.

==== PFL season 2022 ====
Isaev was scheduled to face Klidson Abreu on April 28, 2022, at PFL 2. However, Isaev pulled out of the bout and was replaced by Adam Keresh.

Isaev was scheduled to face Jamelle Jones on June 24, 2022, at PFL 5. However, Isaev once again pulled out of the bout.

=== Bellator MMA ===
On September 30, 2022, it was announced that Isaev had signed a multi-fight deal with Bellator MMA.

Isaev made his Bellator debut against Steve Mowry on February 4, 2023, at Bellator 290. The bout concluded in a unanimous draw.

Isaev was scheduled to face Daniel James on November 17, 2023, at Bellator 301. The week of the event, the bout was scrapped for unknown reasons.

== Personal life ==
Isaev has Azerbaijani citizenship. After signing his contract with Bellator, he got a United States visa using his Azerbaijani passport.

== Championships and accomplishments ==
- Professional Fighters League
  - 2019 Heavyweight Championship

== Mixed martial arts record ==
Professional record breakdown
10 matches	9 wins	0 losses
By knockout	4	0
By decision	5	0
Draws	1	

Res.	Record	Opponent	Method	Event	Date	Round	Time	Location	Notes
Draw	9–0–1	Steve Mowry	Draw (unanimous)	Bellator 290	February 4, 2023	3	5:00	Inglewood, California, United States	
Win	9–0	Jared Rosholt	TKO (punches)	PFL 10 (2019)	December 31, 2019	4	4:09	New York City, New York, United States	Won the 2019 PFL Heavyweight Tournament.
Win	8–0	Denis Goltsov	TKO (punches)	PFL 9 (2019)	October 31, 2019	3	4:59	Las Vegas, Nevada, United States	2019 PFL Heavyweight Tournament Semifinal.
Win	7–0	Kelvin Tiller	Decision (unanimous)	PFL 9 (2019)	October 31, 2019	2	5:00	Las Vegas, Nevada, United States	2019 PFL Heavyweight Tournament Quarterfinal.
Win	6–0	Carl Seumanutafa	Decision (unanimous)	PFL 6 (2019)	August 8, 2019	3	5:00	Atlantic City, New Jersey, United States	
Win	5–0	Valdrin Istrefi	Decision (unanimous)	PFL 3 (2019)	June 6, 2019	3	5:00	Uniondale, New York, United States	
Win	4–0	Alexander Gladkov	KO (spinning wheel kick and punches)	Fight Nights Global 90	October 19, 2018	1	1:36	Moscow, Russia	
Win	3–0	Vladimir Daineko	TKO (punches)	Fight Nights Global 83	February 23, 2018	2	0:40	Moscow, Russia	
Win	2–0	Mikhail Kabargin	Decision (unanimous)	Fight Nights Global 53	October 7, 2016	3	5:00	Moscow, Russia	
Win	1–0	Timofey Mishev	Decision (unanimous)	Fight Nights Global 46	April 29, 2016	3	5:00	Moscow, Russia	Heavyweight debut.

== Submission grappling record ==
1 Matches, 0 Wins (0 Submissions), 1 Losses (0 Submissions), 0 Draws
Result	Rec.	Opponent	Method	Event	Division	Date	Location
Loss	0–1–0	(Iran) Pouya Rahmani	Decision	ACBJJ 21	Heavyweight	05 July 2026	Moscow, Russia

== Freestyle record ==
World Championships & Olympic Games Matches
Res.	Opponent	Score	Date	Event	Location
2010 World Championships
Loss	(Greece) Ioannis Arzoumanidis	0–1, 0–1	September 6–12, 2010	2010 World Wrestling Championships	Moscow, Russia
Win	(Belarus) Aleksey Shemarov	1-0, 6–0	September 6–12, 2010	2010 World Wrestling Championships	Moscow, Russia
Loss	(Uzbekistan) Artur Taymazov	0–1, 3–2,0-1	September 6–12, 2010	2010 World Wrestling Championships	Moscow, Russia
Win	(Cameroon) Andrei Podsevalnicov	3-0, 4–0	September 6–12, 2010	2010 World Wrestling Championships	Moscow, Russia
Win	(Moldova) Hugues Onanena	2-0, 5–0	September 6–12, 2010	2010 World Wrestling Championships	Moscow, Russia
2009 World Championships
Loss	(United States) Tervel Dlagnev	0–1, 0–4	September 21–29, 2009	2009 World Wrestling Championships	Herning, Denmark
Win	(Kazakhstan) Marid Mutalimov	2-0, 1–0	September 21–29, 2009	2009 World Wrestling Championships	Herning, Denmark
Win	(Venezuela) Yonsi Sánchez	1–0, 1–0	September 21–29, 2009	2009 World Wrestling Championships	Herning, Denmark
2008 Summer Olympics
Loss	(Cuba) Disney Rodríguez	0–1, 0–4	August 21, 2008	2008 Summer Olympics	(Denmark) Beijing, China
Loss	(Uzbekistan) Artur Taymazov	0-2, 3–4	August 21, 2008	2008 Summer Olympics	(Denmark) Beijing, China
2007 World Championships
Loss	(Uzbekistan) Artur Taymazov	0–1, 0–4	September 17–23, 2007	2007 World Wrestling Championships	Baku, Azerbaijan
Win	(Mongolia) Ganzorigiin Gankhuyag	3–5, 3–0 F	September 17–23, 2007	2007 World Wrestling Championships	Baku, Azerbaijan
Win	(Poland) Maksymilian Witek	4–2, 1–0 F	September 17–23, 2007	2007 World Wrestling Championships	Baku, Azerbaijan

== See also ==
- List of male mixed martial artists
