= Maxim Grishin =

Russian mixed martial artist

- Born: 2 May 1984 (age 42); Vyazma, Russian SFSR, Soviet Union
- Native name: Максим Гришин
- Other names: Maximus
- Nationality: Russian
- Height: 6 ft 3 in (1.91 m)
- Weight: 205 lb (93 kg; 14 st 9 lb)
- Division: Light Heavyweight (205) (2012–present); Heavyweight (265 lb) (2008–2011)
- Reach: 78 in (198 cm)
- Style: Armeyskiy Rukopashniy Boy, Boxing, Kickboxing
- Fighting out of: Stary Oskol, Russia
- Team: Akhmat Fight Club; Red Devil Sport Club; Imperial Team; Strong Style Fight Team
- Rank: Master of Sport in Army Hand-to-hand combat
- Years active: 2008–present

Kickboxing record
- Total: 2
- Wins: 2

Mixed martial arts record
- Total: 49
- Wins: 35
- By knockout: 17
- By submission: 6
- By decision: 12
- Losses: 12
- By knockout: 4
- By submission: 3
- By decision: 5
- Draws: 2

Other information
- Mixed martial arts record from Sherdog

Maxim Gennadievich Grishin (born 2 May 1984) is a Russian professional mixed martial artist and kickboxer who competes in the Light Heavyweight division. A professional since 2008, he has competed in the Ultimate Fighting Championship and was the former M-1 Global Eastern Europe Heavyweight Champion.

== Mixed martial arts career ==
=== Background ===
Grishin competes in the heavyweight division, despite weighing around 220 lb, a mere 15 lb over the light heavyweight weight limit. Grishin, therefore, is regarded as a small heavyweight, though he has fast striking ability.

He trains with the Red Devil Sport Club – the training facility of Fedor Emelianenko and other top Russian fighters. As part of the Red Devil Sport Club, Grishin has also trained in Stary Oskol at the St. Alexander Nevsky Sport Palace. In the build-up for his intended M-1 Global title fight against Guram Gugenishvili, Grishin trained with Kirill Sidelnikov, Dmitry Samoilov, Viktor Nemkov and Alexei Nazarov. Unfortunately, Grishin was forced to withdraw from the bout with a knee injury that occurred during a national hand-to-hand combat fighting championship in Ufa. Consequently, M-1 Global Americas Champion Kenny Garner gained the opportunity to challenge fight Gugenishvili for the M-1 Heavyweight Challenge Title.

=== Early career ===
Grishin made his professional mixed martial arts debut against Gela Getsadze at the World Pankration Championship. After going the two-round distance, Grishin was declared the winner via unanimous decision. However, that same night, Judo ace Baga Agaev used an armbar to force Grishin to submit just 47 seconds into their match.

=== M-1 Global ===
Grishin joined M-1 Global in 2009, claiming a TKO victory in his first bout in March of that year. Grishin faced Joaquim Ferreira in Brazil soon after, but lost via north-south choke. Grishin suffered a further loss at the hands of Shane del Rosario in South Korea, defeated by TKO in just 21 seconds.

After a further two wins in the M-1 Global organisation, Grishin appeared for the Konfrontacja Sztuk Walki promotion at KSW 12, where he faced Dawid Baziak. Baziak defeated Grishin via unanimous decision. Returning to M-1 organisation, Grishin joined their Eastern European tournament. His opening round fight was against Gadzhimurad Nurmagomedov, which Grishin won via TKO in round 1 to progress to the semi-final. There, Grishin met Arsen Abdulkerimov, again winning via TKO to reach the final.

In the final, Grishin had to face his training partner Alexander Volkov. Despite Volkov's superior record of 7–1, Grishin won the fight via rear naked choke in the opening round. Consequently, Grishin became the M-1 Global Eastern European Heavyweight Champion. As Eastern European Champion, Grishin was scheduled to face Guram Gugenishvili, the Western European Champion, for the inaugural M-1 Global Heavyweight Championship. However, a month before the fight, Grishin withdrew with a knee injury providing M-1 Selection Americas Champion Kenny Garner with an opportunity to challenge for the title.

Grishin faced Joachim Christensen on May 16, 2012 at М-1 Challenge 32 in his light heavyweight debut. He won via unanimous decision (29–28, 29–28, 29–27). and was due to face Western Europe Champion Guram Gugenishvili for the M-1 Global heavyweight title until a knee injury forced his withdrawal.

=== Fight Nights ===
Grishin faced Rameau Thierry Sokoudjou in a kickboxing match on February 23 (Defender of the Fatherland Day), 2013 at Fight Nights 10. He won via split (29–28, 28–29, 28–29).

Grishin faced Trevor Prangley, gilling in for an injured Mike Kyle, at Fight Nights: Battle of Moscow 17 on 30 September 2014. He won the fight via TKO in the second round.

=== Professional Fighters League ===
==== 2018 Season ====
Grishin made his PFL debut on June 21, 2018 at PFL 2 (2018 season) against Jason Butcher. Grishin won the fight in the first round after Butcher injured his ankle and foot after falling down.

Grishin then faced Rakim Cleveland on August 2, 2018 at PFL 5 (2018 season). He won the bout via rear-naked choke in the second round.

Having won both of his bouts, Grishin advanced to the Quarter-Finals, where he faced Smealinho Rama on October 13, 2018 at PFL 9 (2018 season). The bout ended in a majority draw after two rounds. However Rama advanced further in the tournament via first round tiebreaker, wherein the winner of the first round advances further.

==== 2019 Season ====
Grishin appeared on the next season, marking the occasion by facing former UFC fighter Jordan Johnson on June 6, 2019 at PFL 3 (2019 season). Grishin won the fight via unanimous decision.

Grishin faced Mikhail Mokhnatkin on August 8, 2019 at PFL 6 (2019 season). He won the fight with ease, knocking Mikhail out early in the first round.

Having won the first two bouts of this season like last one, Grishin would rematch against Jordan Johnson in the Quarterfinals on October 31, 2019 at PFL 9 (2019 season). Just like last season, he would draw with his opponent and be eliminated via the first round tiebreaker.

=== Ultimate Fighting Championship ===
Grishin made his UFC debut as a replacement for Alexander Romanov against Marcin Tybura on July 11, 2020 at UFC 251. Grishin lost the fight via unanimous decision.

Grishin faced Gadzhimurad Antigulov on October 18, 2020 at UFC Fight Night: Ortega vs. The Korean Zombie. He won the fight via technical knockout in round two.

Grishin faced Dustin Jacoby on February 27, 2021 at UFC Fight Night: Rozenstruik vs. Gane. At the weigh-ins, Maxim Grishin weighed in at 210.5 pounds, four and a half pounds over the light heavyweight non-title fight limit of 206 pounds. His bout proceeded at a catchweight and Grishin was fined 30% of his individual purse, which went to Jacoby. He lost a close bout via unanimous decision.

Grishin was scheduled to face Ovince Saint Preux on June 26, 2021 at UFC Fight Night 190. However, Grishin withdrew from the bout due to visa issues and was replaced by Tanner Boser in a heavyweight bout.

Grishin was expected to face Ed Herman on February 12, 2022 at UFC 271. However, Herman pulled out off the bout and was replaced by William Knight. At the weigh-ins, Knight weighed in at 218 pounds, 12 pounds over the light heavyweight non-title fight limit, marking the biggest weight miss in UFC history. As a result, the bout was shifted to heavyweight and Knight was fined 40% of his purse, which went to Grishin. Grishin won the bout via unanimous decision.

Grishin was scheduled to face Jailton Almeida on May 21, 2022 at UFC Fight Night 206. However, Grishin pulled out due to undisclosed reasons in late April. Almeida decided to move up to heavyweight and will face Parker Porter.

Grishin was scheduled to face Philipe Lins on October 1, 2022, at UFC Fight Night 211. Despite both men weighing in successfully, the bout was cancelled while the event was in progress due to an undisclosed medical issue.

The bout between Grishin and Jailton Almeida was rescheduled for UFC Fight Night 214 on November 5, 2022. On the Monday of fight week, the bout was reported scrapped from this card for unknown reasons.

Grishin faced Philipe Lins on June 3, 2023, at UFC on ESPN 46. He lost the fight via unanimous decision.

On June 7, it was announced that Grishin was not extended a new contract and no longer on the UFC roster.

=== Post UFC ===
In his first performance after leaving the UFC, Grishin faced Asylzhan Bakhytzhanuly on December 15, 2023 at RCC 17, winning a controversial unanimous decision.

== Championships and Accomplishments ==
=== Mixed Martial Arts ===
- World Fighting Championship Akhmat
  - WCFA Light Heavyweight Champion (one time)
- M-1 Global
  - M-1 Selection 2010 Eastern Europe Championships.

=== Hand-to-hand combat ===
- Russian Union of Martial Arts
  - Hand-to-hand combat Russian National Champion.

== Kickboxing record ==
Kickboxing record
2 win (0 KOs), 0 losses, 0 draws
Date	Result	Opponent	Event	Location	Method	Round	Time	Record
2015-12-26	Win	(Croatia) Stjepan Bekavac	WFCA 13: Grozny Battle 9	Grozny, Russia	Decision (split)	3	3:00	2-0
2013-02-23	Win	(Cameroon) Sokoudjou	Fight Nights: Battle of Moscow 10	Moscow, Russia	Decision (split)	3	3:00	1-0
Legend: Win Loss Draw/No contest Notes

== Mixed martial arts record ==
Professional record breakdown
49 matches	35 wins	12 losses
By knockout	17	4
By submission	6	3
By decision	12	5
Draws	2	

Res.	Record	Opponent	Method	Event	Date	Round	Time	Location	Notes
Loss	35–12–2	Asylzhan Bakhytzhanuly	Decision (unanimous)	ACA 202	April 12, 2026	3	5:00	Saint Petersburg, Russia	
Loss	35–11–2	Alexey Butorin	KO (punches)	ACA 195	November 7, 2025	1	2:46	Saint Petersburg, Russia	
Win	35–10–2	Evgeny Egemberdiev	TKO (arm injury)	ACA 186	May 10, 2025	2	0:47	Saint Petersburg, Russia	Catchweight (209.2 lb) bout; Egemberdiev missed weight.
Win	34–10–2	Oleg Olenichev	Decision (unanimous)	ACA 182	December 14, 2024	3	5:00	Moscow, Russia	
Win	33–10–2	Asylzhan Bakhytzhanuly	Decision (unanimous)	RCC 17	December 15, 2023	3	5:00	Yekaterinburg, Russia	Catchweight (220 lb) bout.
Loss	32–10–2	Philipe Lins	Decision (unanimous)	UFC on ESPN: Kara-France vs. Albazi	June 3, 2023	3	5:00	Las Vegas, Nevada, United States	
Win	32–9–2	William Knight	Decision (unanimous)	UFC 271	February 12, 2022	3	5:00	Houston, Texas, United States	Heavyweight bout.
Loss	31–9–2	Dustin Jacoby	Decision (unanimous)	UFC Fight Night: Rozenstruik vs. Gane	February 27, 2021	3	5:00	Las Vegas, Nevada, United States	Catchweight (210.5 lb) bout; Grishin missed weight.
Win	31–8–2	Gadzhimurad Antigulov	TKO (punches)	UFC Fight Night: Ortega vs. The Korean Zombie	October 17, 2020	2	4:58	Abu Dhabi, United Arab Emirates	
Loss	30–8–2	Marcin Tybura	Decision (unanimous)	UFC 251	July 12, 2020	3	5:00	Abu Dhabi, United Arab Emirates	Heavyweight bout.
Draw	30–7–2	Jordan Johnson	Draw (majority)	PFL 9 (2019)	October 31, 2019	2	5:00	Las Vegas, Nevada, United States	2019 PFL Light Heavyweight Tournament Quarterfinal.
Win	30–7–1	Mikhail Mokhnatkin	KO (punch)	PFL 6 (2019)	August 8, 2019	1	0:48	Atlantic City, New Jersey, United States	
Win	29–7–1	Jordan Johnson	Decision (unanimous)	PFL 3 (2019)	June 6, 2019	3	5:00	Long Island, New York, United States	
Draw	28–7–1	Smealinho Rama	Draw (majority)	PFL 9 (2018)	October 13, 2018	2	5:00	Long Beach, California, United States	2018 PFL Light Heavyweight Tournament Quarterfinal.
Win	28–7	Rakim Cleveland	Submission (rear-naked choke)	PFL 5 (2018)	August 2, 2018	2	4:03	Long Island, New York, United States	
Win	27–7	Jason Butcher	TKO (leg injury)	PFL 2 (2018)	June 21, 2018	1	1:41	Chicago, Illinois, United States	
Win	26–7	Leonardo Guimarães	Decision (unanimous)	WFCA 45	February 24, 2018	3	5:00	Grozny, Russia	Won the AFC Light Heavyweight Championship.
Win	25–7	Dirlei Broenstrup	Decision (unanimous)	WFCA 42: Malyutin vs Jacarezinho	September 27, 2017	3	5:00	Moscow, Russia	
Win	24–7	Matej Batinić	KO (head kick)	Akhmat Fight Show 34: Battle in Moscow	February 25, 2017	3	2:43	Moscow, Russia	
Loss	23–7	Magomed Ankalaev	TKO (punches)	Akhmat Fight Show 30: Grand Prix Akhmat 2016 Finals	October 4, 2016	4	1:13	Grozny, Russia	For the vacant AFC Light Heavyweight Championship.
Win	23–6	Maxim Futin	Decision (unanimous)	Akhmat Fight Show 23: Grand Prix Akhmat 2016	June 11, 2016	3	5:00	Grozny, Russia	
Win	22–6	Marcin Łazarz	Decision (unanimous)	Akhmat Fight Show 18: Grand Prix Akhmat 2016	April 9, 2016	3	5:00	Grozny, Russia	
Win	21–6	Joaquim Ferreira	TKO (punches)	WFCA 9: Grozny Battle 6	October 4, 2015	3	3:06	Grozny, Russia	Catchweight (212 lb) bout.
Win	20–6	Malik Merad	Submission (rear-naked choke)	WFCA 3: Grozny Battle 3	June 13, 2015	1	4:43	Grozny, Russia	
Win	19–6	Dorian Ilić	Submission (arm-triangle choke)	WFCA 1: Grozny Battle 1	March 14, 2015	1	3:15	Grozny, Russia	
Win	18–6	Trevor Prangley	TKO (punches)	Fight Nights Global 27: Battle Of Moscow 17	September 30, 2014	2	2:04	Moscow, Russia	Catchweight (209 lb) bout; Grishin missed weight.
Win	17–6	Rodney Wallace	Decision (split)	Driven MMA: One	March 1, 2014	3	5:00	Canton, Ohio, United States	
Win	16–6	Mário Miranda	Decision (unanimous)	Fight Nights Global 20: Battle Of Moscow 13	October 27, 2013	3	5:00	Moscow, Russia	Catchweight (207.5 lb) bout; Grishin missed weight.
Win	15–6	Ray Lopez	Submission (rear-naked choke)	NAAFS: Fight Night in the Flats 9	June 1, 2013	1	4:25	Cleveland, Ohio, United States	
Win	14–6	William Hill	TKO (punches)	NAAFS: Caged Vengeance 12	October 20, 2012	1	3:57	Streetsboro, Ohio, United States	
Win	13–6	Joachim Christensen	Decision (unanimous)	M-1 Challenge 32	May 16, 2012	3	5:00	Moscow, Russia	Return to Light Heavyweight.
Loss	12–6	Kenny Garner	TKO (submission to punches)	M-1 Challenge 27	October 14, 2011	5	4:07	Phoenix, Arizona, United States	For the interim M-1 Global Heavyweight Championship.
Win	12–5	Júlio Cézar de Lima	TKO (punches)	League S-70: Russia vs. Brazil	August 5, 2011	1	1:22	Sochi, Russia	
Win	11–5	Alan Sobanov	KO (punch)	SMMAI: Tornado	July 8, 2011	1	3:30	Sochi, Russia	
Win	10–5	Samir Akhmetov	TKO (punches)	Sochi MMA International	July 5, 2011	1	1:43	Sochi, Russia	
Win	9–5	Stanislav Mirzamagomedov	Submission (arm-triangle choke)	MFT: Fedor Emelianenko Cup	May 22, 2011	1	2:32	Nizhny Novgorod, Russia	
Win	8–5	Vladimir Kuchenko	TKO (leg kick and punches)	M-1 Challenge 25	April 28, 2011	3	3:14	Saint Petersburg, Russia	
Loss	7–5	Guram Gugenishvili	Submission (rear-naked choke)	M-1 Challenge 23	March 5, 2011	1	3:38	Moscow, Russia	For the M-1 Global Heavyweight Championship.
Win	7–4	Alexander Volkov	Submission (rear-naked choke)	M-1 Selection 2010: Eastern Europe Finals	July 22, 2010	1	2:39	Moscow, Russia	Won the M-1 Global Eastern Europe Heavyweight Tournament.
Win	6–4	Arsen Abdulkerimov	TKO (punches)	M-1 Selection 2010: Eastern Europe Round 3	May 28, 2010	1	1:52	Kyiv, Ukraine	M-1 Global Eastern Europe Heavyweight Tournament Semifinal.
Win	5–4	Gadzhimurad Nurmagomedov	TKO (punches)	M-1 Selection 2010: Eastern Europe Round 2	April 10, 2010	1	2:05	Kyiv, Ukraine	M-1 Global Eastern Europe Heavyweight Tournament Opening Round.
Loss	4–4	Dawid Baziak	Decision (unanimous)	KSW 12	December 11, 2009	3	3:00	Warsaw, Poland	
Win	4–3	Levan Persaev	TKO (knee)	M-1 Challenge 20: 2009 Finals	December 3, 2009	1	1:56	Saint Petersburg, Russia	
Win	3–3	Dmitry Zabolotny	TKO (punches)	M-1 Challenge: 2009 Selections 7	October 3, 2009	1	N/A	Moscow, Russia	
Loss	2–3	Shane del Rosario	TKO (punches)	M-1 Challenge 17	July 4, 2009	1	0:21	Seoul, South Korea	
Loss	2–2	Joaquim Ferreira	Submission (north-south choke)	M-1 Challenge 15	May 9, 2009	1	3:57	São Paulo, Brazil	Return to Heavyweight.
Win	2–1	Magomed Umarov	TKO (punches)	M-1 Challenge: 2009 Selections 1	March 13, 2009	1	N/A	Saint Petersburg, Russia	Light Heavyweight debut.
Loss	1–1	Baga Agaev	Submission (armbar)	WAFC: World Pankration Championship 2008	May 24, 2008	1	0:47	Khabarovsk Krai, Russia	
Win	1–0	Gela Getsadze	Decision (unanimous)	WAFC: World Pankration Championship 2008	May 24, 2008	2	5:00	Khabarovsk Krai, Russia	Heavyweight debut.

== See also ==
- List of male mixed martial artists
