= Emiliano Sordi =

Argentine mixed martial artist (born 1991)

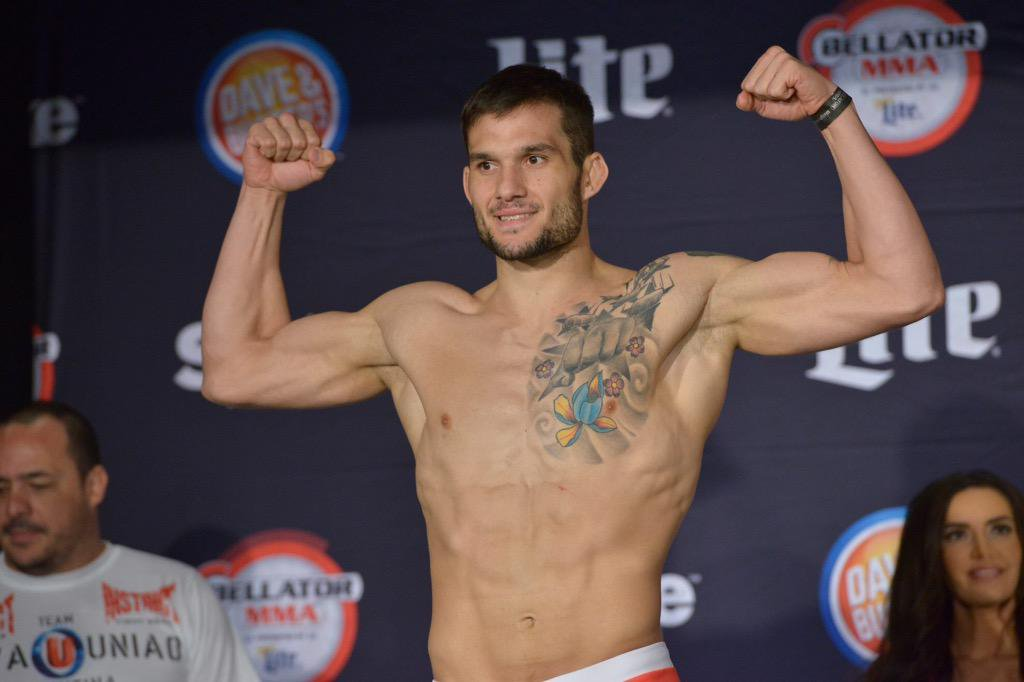
- Born: 15 February 1991 (age 35); Río Cuarto, Córdoba, Argentina
- Other names: He-Man
- Nationality: Argentine
- Height: 6 ft 2 in (1.88 m)
- Weight: 205 lb (93 kg; 14 st 9 lb)
- Division: Light Heavyweight
- Reach: 77 in (196 cm)
- Fighting out of: Rio Cuarto, Cordoba, Argentina
- Team: Nova União Argentina (until 2016); Alliance MMA
- Years active: 2009–present

Mixed martial arts record
- Total: 43
- Wins: 27
- By knockout: 18
- By submission: 7
- By decision: 2
- Losses: 15
- By knockout: 9
- By submission: 4
- By decision: 2
- Draws: 1

Other information
- Mixed martial arts record from Sherdog

Emiliano Sordi (born 15 February 1991) is an Argentine professional mixed martial artist who competes in the light heavyweight division of the Professional Fighters League, where he was the 2019 Light Heavyweight Tournament Champion. He has also formerly competed for Jungle Fight and Bellator MMA. As of August 21, 2026, he is #9 in the PFL light heavyweight rankings.

== Mixed martial arts career ==
=== Early career ===
Emiliano Sordi started his MMA career in 2009, in the regional promotion Real Fights Argentina. His debut was a loss. He then fought for many promotions across South America, racking up a record of 11 wins and 4 losses.

=== Bellator MMA ===
In 2014, Sordi signed with Bellator MMA. He debuted for the promotion with the event Bellator 128, on 10 October, winning against Bubba McDaniel via submission.

He fought two more times for the promotion, losing both times. The first was against A.J. Matthews at Bellator 141 on 28 August 2015, where he lost via TKO after his corner stopped the fight between rounds one and two. The second loss was against Gregory Babene at Bellator 166 on 2 December 2016, via a guillotine choke in the first round.

=== Dana White's Contender Series (DWCS) ===
After another 2 wins on the South American MMA regional scene, Sordi fought at Dana White's Contender Series 10 on 19 June 2018. His fight was against Ryan Spann and Sordi was submitted 26 seconds into the bout via a guillotine choke.

=== Professional Fighters League ===
==== PFL season 2018 ====
In 2018, Sordi began competing in the Light heavyweight division of the Professional Fighters League. He debuted in the event PFL 7, where he knocked out Jason Butcher in the first round. In his second fight for the promotion, Sordi lost to Bozigit Ataev at PFL 9.

==== PFL season 2019 ====
Sordi started the 2019 season with a victory over Brazilian fighter Vinny Magalhães at PFL 3. He then avenged his 2018 loss against Bozigit Ataev with a knockout victory at PFL 6.

With those two victories, Sordi qualified for the 2019 PFL Tournament Playoffs at PFL 9. He beat Sigi Pesaleli and Bozigit Ataev on the same night, qualifying for the tournament final.

On 21 December 2019, Sordi faced Jordan Johnson at PFL 10 at Madison Square Garden in New York City to determine the 2019 PLF Tournament Champion. Sordi won via knockout on the first round and became the first Argentine PFL Tournament Champion

==== PFL season 2020 ====
The PFL 2020 season was canceled because of the COVID-19 pandemic

==== PFL season 2021 ====
Sordi started the 2021 season at PFL 2, where he beat Chris Camozzi via unanimous decision. He then fought Dan Spohn to a draw at PFL 5, qualifying to the 2021 playoffs.

At PFL 9, Sordi lost via unanimous decision to Antônio Carlos Júnior, who would later then become the PFL 2021 Light Heavyweight Tournament Champion.

==== PFL season 2022 ====
Sordi was expected to face Josh Silveira at PFL 1, but his opponent pulled out of the fight three days before the event. Sordi instead faced late-replacement Cory Hendricks, and lost via technical knockout.

At PFL 4, Sordi lost to Delan Monte. With two losses, Sordi failed to qualify to the playoffs.

=== Post PFL ===
In 2023, Sordi decided to leave PFL and signed a one-fight deal with UAE Warriors. He fought Asylzhan Bakhytzhanuly at UAE Warriors 36, and lost via technical knockout.

Sordi beat Markus Perez in May 2023.

==== Global Fight League ====
On 11 December 2024, it was announced that Sordi was signed by Global Fight League. However, in April 2025, it was reported that all GFL events were cancelled indefinitely.

=== Return to PFL ===
Sordi faced Simeon Powell on May 2, 2026, at PFL Sioux Falls. He lost the fight via technical knockout in round three.

Sordi faced Abraham Bably on October 16, 2026, at PFL Chicago 2. He won the fight via technical knockout in round two.

== Championships and accomplishments ==
- Professional Fighters League
  - 2019 Light Heavyweight Championship

== Mixed martial arts record ==
Professional record breakdown
| 43 matches | 28 wins | 14 losses |
| By knockout | 19 | 8 |
| By submission | 7 | 4 |
| By decision | 2 | 2 |
| Draws | 1 | |

| Res. | Record | Opponent | Method | Event | Date | Round | Time | Location | Notes |
|---|---|---|---|---|---|---|---|---|---|
| Win | 28–14–1 | Abraham Bably | TKO (punches) | PFL Chicago: Carmouche vs. Bishop 2 | October 16, 2026 | 2 | 3:13 | Chicago, Illinois, United States | |
| Loss | 27–14–1 | Simeon Powell | TKO (knee) | PFL Sioux Falls: Storley vs. Zendeli | May 2, 2026 | 3 | 3:05 | Sioux Falls, South Dakota, United States | |
| Win | 27–13–1 | Tom Breese | Submission (rear-naked choke) | FNC 25 | November 29, 2025 | 1 | 2:15 | Varaždin, Croatia | |
| Win | 26–13–1 | Marcos Brigagão | KO (punches) | XFC 52 | 28 March 2025 | 1 | 1:27 | Iowa City, Iowa, United States | |
| Win | 25–13–1 | Hugo Lezama | TKO (punches) | Fusion FC 79 | 1 August 2024 | 1 | 2:30 | Buenos Aires, Argentina | Won the vacant Fusion FC Light Heavyweight Championship. |
| Loss | 24–13–1 | Diyar Nurgozhay | TKO (punches) | UAE Warriors 50 | 18 May 2024 | 1 | 4:17 | Abu Dhabi, United Arab Emirates | |
| Win | 24–12–1 | Markus Perez | Decision (unanimous) | Gamebred Bareknuckle MMA 4 | 5 May 2023 | 3 | 5:00 | Fort Lauderdale, Florida, United States | Bare Knuckle MMA. |
| Loss | 23–12–1 | Asylzhan Bakhytzhanuly | TKO (punches) | UAE Warriors 36 | 25 February 2023 | 2 | 1:11 | Abu Dhabi, United Arab Emirates | |
| Loss | 23–11–1 | Delan Monte | TKO (punches) | PFL 4 (2022) | 17 June 2022 | 1 | 1:32 | Atlanta, Georgia, United States | |
| Loss | 23–10–1 | Cory Hendricks | TKO (punches) | PFL 1 (2022) | 20 April 2022 | 2 | 2:13 | Arlington, Texas, United States | |
| Loss | 23–9–1 | Antônio Carlos Júnior | Decision (unanimous) | PFL 9 (2021) | 27 August 2021 | 3 | 5:00 | Hollywood, Florida, United States | 2021 PFL Light Heavyweight Tournament Semifinal. |
| Draw | 23–8–1 | Dan Spohn | Draw (unanimous) | PFL 5 (2021) | 17 June 2021 | 3 | 5:00 | Atlantic City, New Jersey, United States | Sordi was deducted one point in round 1 due to strikes to the back of the head. |
| Win | 23–8 | Chris Camozzi | Decision (unanimous) | PFL 2 (2021) | 29 April 2021 | 3 | 5:00 | Atlantic City, New Jersey, United States | |
| Win | 22–8 | Jordan Johnson | TKO (punches) | PFL 10 (2019) | 31 December 2019 | 1 | 2:01 | New York City, New York, United States | Won the 2019 PFL Light Heavyweight Tournament. |
| Win | 21–8 | Bozigit Ataev | Submission (rear-naked choke) | PFL 9 (2019) | 31 October 2019 | 1 | 4:26 | Las Vegas, Nevada, United States | 2019 PFL Light Heavyweight Tournament Semifinal. |
| Win | 20–8 | Sigi Pesaleli | TKO (punches) | PFL 9 (2019) | 31 October 2019 | 1 | 1:13 | Las Vegas, Nevada, United States | 2019 PFL Light Heavyweight Tournament Quarterfinal. |
| Win | 19–8 | Bozigit Ataev | KO (punches) | PFL 6 (2019) | 8 August 2019 | 1 | 1:23 | Atlantic City, New Jersey, United States | |
| Win | 18–8 | Vinny Magalhães | TKO (punches) | PFL 3 (2019) | 6 June 2019 | 2 | 2:45 | Uniondale, New York, United States | |
| Loss | 17–8 | Bozigit Ataev | TKO (punches) | PFL 9 (2018) | 13 October 2018 | 1 | 1:43 | Long Beach, California, United States | |
| Win | 17–7 | Jason Butcher | KO (punch) | PFL 7 (2018) | 30 August 2018 | 1 | 0:16 | Atlantic City, New Jersey, United States | |
| Loss | 16–7 | Ryan Spann | Submission (guillotine choke) | Dana White's Contender Series 10 | 19 June 2018 | 1 | 0:26 | Las Vegas, Nevada, United States | |
| Win | 16–6 | Douglas Rakchal | TKO (punches) | Arena Tour 9 | 9 June 2017 | 1 | 1:30 | Buenos Aires, Argentina | Return to Light Heavyweight. |
| Win | 15–6 | Jackson Mora Rodriguez | TKO (punches) | Fusion FC 25 | 22 February 2017 | 1 | 4:15 | Lima, Peru | Won the vacant Fusion FC Middleweight Championship. |
| Loss | 14–6 | Gregory Babene | Submission (guillotine choke) | Bellator 166 | 2 December 2016 | 1 | 3:11 | Thackerville, Oklahoma, United States | |
| Win | 14–5 | Fernando di Pierro | TKO (punches) | Arena Tour 7 | 19 September 2015 | 2 | N/A | Buenos Aires, Argentina | |
| Loss | 13–5 | AJ Matthews | TKO (retirement) | Bellator 141 | 28 August 2015 | 1 | 5:00 | Temecula, California, United States | |
| Win | 13–4 | Bubba McDaniel | Submission (guillotine choke) | Bellator 128 | 10 October 2014 | 1 | 0:58 | Thackerville, Oklahoma, United States | |
| Win | 12–4 | Alexandre Oliveira | KO (punches) | X-Fight MMA 7 | 23 November 2013 | 1 | 1:35 | Araraquara, Brazil | |
| Win | 11–4 | Vander Carlini | TKO (punches) | Peru FC 14 | 17 August 2013 | 1 | 2:55 | Lima, Peru | |
| Win | 10–4 | Pedro Galiza | TKO (rib injury) | Capital Fight 5 | 10 May 2013 | 1 | N/A | Brasília, Brazil | |
| Loss | 9–4 | Kaue Dudus | Submission (anaconda choke) | Infinity MMA 2 | 10 November 2012 | 1 | N/A | Asunción, Paraguay | |
| Win | 9–3 | Ivan Galaz | Submission (rear-naked choke) | Rio Cuarto Fight 3 | 14 September 2012 | 1 | 2:50 | Río Cuarto, Argentina | |
| Win | 8–3 | Jackson Mora Rodriguez | Submission (armbar) | Conviction MMA 3 | 14 July 2012 | 1 | 0:41 | Buenos Aires, Argentina | Middleweight debut. |
| Win | 7–3 | Fabiano Capoani | TKO (punches) | Amazon Forest Combat 2 | 31 March 2012 | 2 | 2:31 | Manaus, Brazil | |
| Loss | 6–3 | Kleber Silva | TKO (punches) | Jungle Fight 36 | 21 January 2012 | 1 | 4:26 | Rio de Janeiro, Brazil | |
| Win | 6–2 | Bruno Cappelozza | Submission (guillotine choke) | Jungle Fight 35 | 17 December 2011 | 1 | 0:34 | Rio de Janeiro, Brazil | |
| Win | 5–2 | Pablo Alvarez | TKO (head kick and punches) | Glam Fight | 7 December 2011 | 1 | 0:27 | Buenos Aires, Argentina | |
| Win | 4–2 | Cesar Veron | TKO (punches) | Dojo Serpiente: Club de la Pelea | 2 October 2011 | 1 | 0:47 | Castelar, Argentina | |
| Loss | 3–2 | Willians Santos | Decision (unanimous) | Jungle Fight 29 | 25 June 2011 | 3 | 5:00 | Serra, Brazil | |
| Win | 3–1 | Lautaro Jauregui Lorda | TKO (punches) | Rio Cuarto Fight 1 | 4 June 2011 | 1 | 0:55 | Río Cuarto, Argentina | |
| Win | 2–1 | Ricardo Pecanha | TKO (punches) | X-Combat Ultra: International Grand Prix | 19 May 2011 | 2 | 3:14 | Campos dos Goytacazes, Brazil | |
| Win | 1–1 | Diego Palau | Submission (guillotine choke) | Explosion Fight Night 2 | 1 November 2009 | 2 | 2:12 | Mar del Plata, Argentina | |
| Loss | 0–1 | Roberto Pastuch | Submission (arm-triangle choke) | Real Fights 6 | 27 September 2009 | 1 | 2:23 | Buenos Aires, Argentina | Light Heavyweight debut |

== Karate Combat record ==
Professional record breakdown
| 1 match | 1 win | 0 losses |
| By knockout | 1 | 0 |

| Res. | Record | Opponent | Method | Event | Date | Round | Time | Location | Notes |
|---|---|---|---|---|---|---|---|---|---|
| Win | 1–0 | Zac Pauga | TKO (punches) | Karate Combat 57 | 31 October 2025 | 1 | 0:04 | Miami, Florida, United States | |

== See also ==
- List of current PFL fighters
- List of Dana White's Contender Series alumni
- List of male mixed martial artists
