= Jordan Johnson (fighter) =

American mixed martial arts fighter (born 1988)

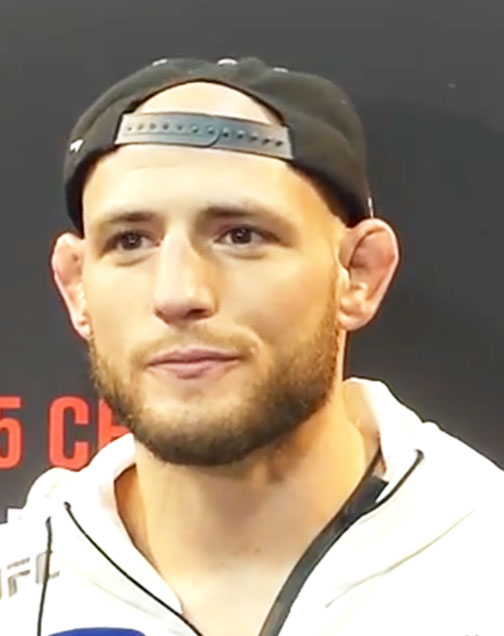
- Jordan Johnson at UFC Fight Night 136 in Moscow, Russia on Sep 15, 2018
- Born: Jordan David Johnson; November 18, 1988 (age 37); Richmond, Virginia, U.S.
- Other names: Big Swingin'
- Height: 6 ft 1 in (1.85 m)
- Weight: 205.5 lb (93.2 kg; 14.68 st)
- Division: Light Heavyweight (2014–2018, 2019–present); Middleweight (2018)
- Reach: 79 in (201 cm)
- Stance: Orthodox
- Fighting out of: San Diego, California, U.S.
- Team: Victory MMA; Alliance MMA; MMA Lab
- Wrestling: NCAA Division I Wrestling
- Years active: 2014–2019

Mixed martial arts record
- Total: 15
- Wins: 12
- By knockout: 2
- By submission: 4
- By decision: 6
- Losses: 2
- By knockout: 1
- By decision: 1
- Draws: 1

Other information
- University: University of Iowa
- Mixed martial arts record from Sherdog

Jordan David Johnson (born November 18, 1988) is a retired American professional mixed martial artist who formerly competed in the middleweight division of the Ultimate Fighting Championship. A professional since 2014, he also competed for the Resurrection Fighting Alliance and Professional Fighters League.

== Background ==
Johnson was born in Richmond, Virginia, on November 18, 1988. He first started wrestling in 6th grade at Washington Jr. High School in Naperville, Illinois. From there, he went on to wrestle for Naperville North High School where he became the Illinois High School State Wrestling Champion his junior year. He moved to Iowa his senior year, placing 3rd in the Iowa state tournament. Upon graduation from high school, Johnson signed on to wrestle at the University of Iowa. He was a two-time University Nationals All-American in freestyle wrestling.

== Wrestling career ==
=== High school ===
Johnson won the 2006 Class AA Illinois heavyweight wrestling state title at Naperville North High School as a junior and placed fifth at state as a sophomore. He placed fifth at NHSCA Senior Nationals his senior year and third at NHSCA Junior Nationals his junior year. Johnson was coached by Danny Knight at Bettendorf High School in Iowa and Tom Champion at Naperville North High School in Illinois.

=== College ===
Johnson wrestled at the University of Iowa, where he had a career record of 25-11.

- 2007-2008 Season-redshirted and Posted a 7–4 season record at 197 pounds while competing unattached, placed fourth at Kaufman-Brand Open and fifth at Jim Fox Open, scored two pins, one technical fall and one major decision.
- 2008-09 Season-Posted a 9–5 record at heavyweight went 1–3 in dual competitions and 1–2 in Big Ten duals, won title at Duhawk Open and placed second at Grand View Open, also competed at Northern Iowa Open, letterwinner placed third at 120 kg at ASICS men's freestyle University National Championships.
- 2009-2010 Season-Posted a 14–3 record at heavyweight, went 7–2 in dual competition and scored 30 team points while competing for injured starter Dan Erekson, went 5–0 at Carver-Hawkeye Arena, won title at Wisconsin Open and placed second at Grand View Open, letterwinner placed sixth at 120 kg/264.5 pounds at ASICS men's freestyle University National Championships.
- 2010-2011 Season-Posted a 2–3 record at heavyweight, wrestled at Kaufman-Brand Open and Midlands Championships.

== Mixed martial arts career ==
=== Early career ===
Johnson made his amateur MMA debut in 2013, compiling an impressive 3–0 record as a Heavyweight. He then turned professional in 2014, amassing an undefeated professional record of 6–0, while becoming the final RFA champion in the process. In January 2017, Johnson was signed by the UFC.

=== Ultimate Fighting Championship ===
Johnson made his promotional debut against Henrique da Silva on January 28, 2017, at UFC on Fox 23. He won the fight via unanimous decision.

Johnson faced Marcel Fortuna on July 7, 2017 at The Ultimate Fighter 25 Finale. He won the fight by unanimous decision.

Johnson faced Adam Milstead on March 3, 2018 at UFC 222. He won the fight by split decision.

Johnson faced promotional newcomer Adam Yandiev, replacing injured Krzysztof Jotko, on September 15, 2018 at UFC Fight Night 136. He won the fight by submission in the second round.

As Johnson didn't agree with the financial terms of UFC's contract extension offer after the fight with Adam Milstead, he became a free agent after the fight with Yandiev.

=== Professional Fighters League ===
On March 21, 2019, Johnson was revealed to be competing in the light heavyweight bracket of Professional Fighters League's second season. He made his debut against Maxim Grishin at PFL 3 on June 6, 2019. He lost the fight by unanimous decision.

Johnson was set to face Tom Lawlor on April 29, 2021 at PFL 2 as the start of the 2021 PFL Light Heavyweight tournament. However, in March, it was announced that Johnson pulled out and was replaced by Antônio Carlos Júnior. Later, PFL announced that Antônio Carlos Júnior will replace Johnson for the whole season.

== Mixed martial arts record ==
Professional record breakdown
15 matches	12 wins	2 losses
By knockout	2	1
By submission	4	0
By decision	6	1
Draws	1	

Res.	Record	Opponent	Method	Event	Date	Round	Time	Location	Notes
Loss	12–2–1	Emiliano Sordi	TKO (punches)	PFL 10 (2019)	December 31, 2019	1	2:01	New York City, New York, United States	2019 PFL Light Heavyweight Tournament Final.
Win	12–1–1	Rashid Yusupov	Decision (unanimous)	PFL 9 (2019)	October 31, 2019	3	5:00	Las Vegas, Nevada, United States	2019 PFL Light Heavyweight Tournament Semifinal.
Draw	11–1–1	Maxim Grishin	Draw (majority)	PFL 9 (2019)	October 31, 2019	2	5:00	Las Vegas, Nevada, United States	2019 PFL Light Heavyweight Tournament Quarterfinal.
Win	11–1	Sigi Pesaleli	Decision (unanimous)	PFL 6 (2019)	August 8, 2019	3	5:00	Atlantic City, New Jersey, United States	
Loss	10–1	Maxim Grishin	Decision (unanimous)	PFL 3 (2019)	June 6, 2019	3	5:00	Uniondale, New York, United States	Return to Light Heavyweight.
Win	10–0	Adam Yandiev	Submission (arm-triangle choke)	UFC Fight Night: Hunt vs. Oleinik	September 15, 2018	2	0:42	Moscow, Russia	Middleweight debut.
Win	9–0	Adam Milstead	Decision (split)	UFC 222	March 3, 2018	3	5:00	Las Vegas, Nevada, United States	
Win	8–0	Marcel Fortuna	Decision (unanimous)	The Ultimate Fighter: Redemption Finale	July 7, 2017	3	5:00	Las Vegas, Nevada, United States	
Win	7–0	Henrique da Silva	Decision (unanimous)	UFC on Fox: Shevchenko vs. Peña	January 28, 2017	3	5:00	Denver, Colorado, United States	
Win	6–0	LeMarcus Tucker	Decision (unanimous)	RFA 46	December 9, 2016	5	5:00	Branson, Missouri, United States	Won the vacant RFA Light Heavyweight Championship.
Win	5–0	Shaun Asher	Submission (rear-naked choke)	RFA 39	July 17, 2016	3	2:37	Hammond, Indiana, United States	
Win	4–0	Ryan Debelak	Submission (arm-triangle choke)	RFA 37	April 15, 2016	1	1:02	Sioux Falls, South Dakota, United States	
Win	3–0	Gemenie Strehlow	Submission (anaconda choke)	RFA 29	August 21, 2015	1	0:48	Sioux Falls, South Dakota, United States	
Win	2–0	Ryan Scheeper	TKO (submission to punches)	PC MMA: Pinnacle Combat 17	October 4, 2014	1	0:32	Cedar Rapids, Iowa, United States	
Win	1–0	Fernando Smith	TKO (punches)	Duel for Domination 7	April 5, 2014	1	2:01	Mesa, Arizona, United States	Light Heavyweight debut.

== Amateur Mixed martial arts record ==
Professional record breakdown
1 match	1 win	0 losses
By submission	1	0

Res.	Record	Opponent	Method	Event	Date	Round	Time	Location	Notes
Win	1–0	Deon Clash	Submission (anaconda choke)	KOTC- Regulators	January 19, 2013	1	1:48	Scottsdale, Arizona, United States	

== See also ==
- List of male mixed martial artists
