= PFL 3 (2019) =

Professional Fighters League MMA event in 2019

- The poster for PFL 3
- Promotion: Professional Fighters League
- Date: June 6, 2019
- Venue: Nassau Coliseum
- City: Uniondale, New York

Event chronology
PFL 2	PFL 3	PFL 4

The PFL 3 mixed martial arts event for the 2019 season of the Professional Fighters League was held on June 6, 2019, at the Nassau Coliseum in Uniondale, New York. This was the third regular season event of 2019 and included fights in the light heavyweight and heavyweight divisions.

== Background ==
Ronny Markes weighed in at 211.8 pounds, 5.8 pounds over the Light Heavyweight limit of 206 pounds. The bout was held as scheduled. However, Markes was ineligible for points if he were to win the match while his opponent Sigi Pesaleli has been awarded 3 points regardless of the outcome of the match.

== Results ==
Main Card (ESPN+)
Weight class				Method	Round	Time	Notes
Light Heavyweight	Emiliano Sordi	def.	Vinny Magalhães	TKO (punches)	2	2:45
Heavyweight	Kelvin Tiller	def.	Muhammed Dereese	Submission (kimura)	1	3:22
Heavyweight	Satoshi Ishii	def.	Zeke Tuinei-Wily	Decision (split) (29-28, 28-29, 29-28)	3	5:00
Heavyweight	Denis Goltsov	def.	Jared Rosholt	TKO (punches)	1	2:03
Heavyweight	Ali Isaev	def.	Valdrin Istrefi	Decision (unanimous) (30-27, 30-27, 30-27)	3	5:00
Light Heavyweight	Viktor Nemkov	def.	Rakim Cleveland	Decision (unanimous) (29-28, 29-28, 29-28)	3	5:00
Light Heavyweight	Ronny Markes	def.	Sigi Pesaleli	TKO (punches)	2	3:44
Light Heavyweight	Rashid Yusupov	def.	Mikhail Mokhnatkin	Decision (unanimous) (30-26, 30-27, 30-27)	3	5:00
Preliminary Card (ESPN 2)
Heavyweight	Francimar Barroso	def.	Alex Nicholson	Decision (split) (29-28, 28-29, 29-28)	3	5:00
Light Heavyweight	Maxim Grishin	def.	Jordan Johnson	Decision (unanimous) (29-28, 29-28, 29-28)	3	5:00
Heavyweight	Ante Delija	def.	Carl Seumanutafa	Decision (unanimous) (30-26, 30-26, 30-27)	3	5:00
Light Heavyweight	Bazigit Atajev	def.	Dan Spohn	KO (punches)	1	3:25

== Standings After Event ==
The point system consists of outcome based scoring and bonuses for an early win. Under the outcome based scoring system, the winner of a fight receives 3 points and the loser receives 0 points. If the fight ends in a draw, both fighters will receive 1 point. The bonus for winning a fight in the first, second, or third round is 3 points, 2 points, and 1 point respectively. For example, if a fighter wins a fight in the first round, then the fighter will receive 6 total points. If a fighter misses weight, then the fighter that missed weight will receive 0 points and his opponent will receive 3 points due to a walkover victory.

=== Light Heavyweight ===
Fighter	Wins	Draws	Losses	1st	2nd	3rd	Total Points (Note: The eight fighters with most points advance to the playoffs)
Bazigit Atajev	1	0	0	1	0	0	6
Emiliano Sordi	1	0	0	0	1	0	5
Rashid Yusupov	1	0	0	0	0	0	3
Maxim Grishin	1	0	0	0	0	0	3
Viktor Nemkov	1	0	0	0	0	0	3
Sigi Pesaleli	1	0	0	0	0	0	3
Jordan Johnson	0	0	1	0	0	0	0
Rakim Cleveland	0	0	1	0	0	0	0
Mikhail Mokhnatkin	0	0	1	0	0	0	0
} Vinny Magalhães	0	0	1	0	0	0	0
} Dan Spohn	0	0	1	0	0	0	0
Ronny Markes	0	0	1	0	0	0	0

=== Heavyweight ===
Fighter	Wins	Draws	Losses	1st	2nd	3rd	Total Points (Note: The eight fighters with most points advance to the playoffs)
Denis Goltsov	1	0	0	1	0	0	6
Kelvin Tiller	1	0	0	1	0	0	6
Ante Delija	1	0	0	0	0	0	3
Ali Isaev	1	0	0	0	0	0	3
Francimar Barroso	1	0	0	0	0	0	3
Satoshi Ishii	1	0	0	0	0	0	3
{ Alex Nicholson	0	0	1	0	0	0	0
Zeke Tuinei-Wily	0	0	1	0	0	0	0
Valdrin Istrefi	0	0	1	0	0	0	0
Carl Seumanutafa	0	0	1	0	0	0	0
Muhammed Dereese	0	0	1	0	0	0	0
Jared Rosholt	0	0	1	0	0	0	0

== See also ==
- List of PFL events
- List of current PFL fighters
