= Bozigit Ataev =

Russian MMA fighter

Bazigit Atajev Бозагит Атаев
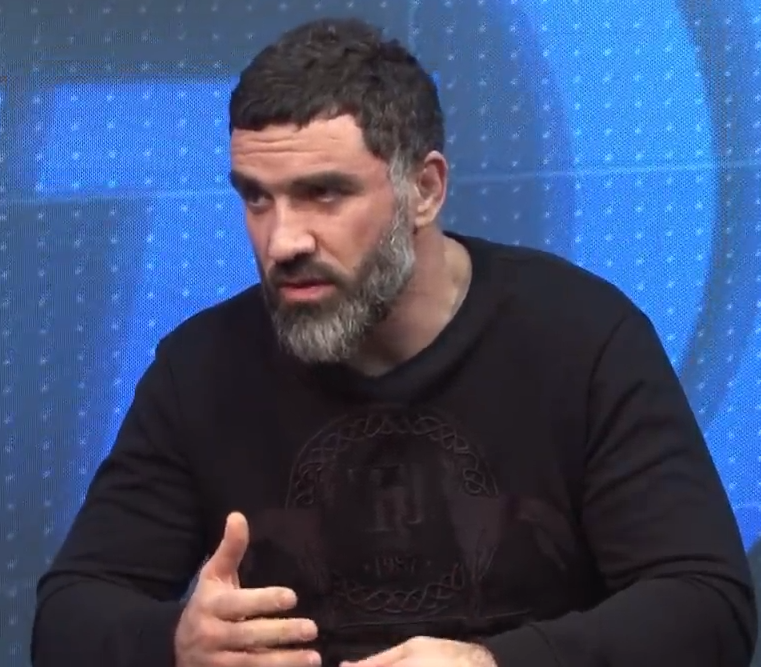
- Bozigit Ataev in 2019
- Born: Bozigit Atavovich Atajev; 3 December 1979 (age 46); Niznie Kazanishe, Buynaksky District, Dagestan ASSR, Russian SFSR, USSR
- Other names: Wolf
- Nationality: Russian
- Height: 6 ft 0 in (1.83 m)
- Weight: 230 lb (100 kg; 16 st)
- Division: Heavyweight; Light Heavyweight (2018–present)
- Style: Sanda, Sambo
- Fighting out of: Makhachkala, Dagestan, Russia
- Team: Pyat Storon Sveta; Russian Top Team
- Years active: 2000–2006, 2017–present

Mixed martial arts record
- Total: 26
- Wins: 20
- By knockout: 15
- By submission: 4
- By decision: 1
- Losses: 5
- By knockout: 3
- By submission: 2
- Draws: 1

Other information
- Notable school: Five Directions of the World
- Mixed martial arts record from Sherdog

Bozigit Ataev
Medal record

Representing Russia

Wushu Sanda

World Championships
Gold medal – first place	2013 Kuala Lumpur	+90 kg
Silver medal – second place	2009 Toronto	+90 kg
Gold medal – first place	2005 Hanoi	+90 kg
Gold medal – first place	2003 Macau	+90 kg
Gold medal – first place	2001 Yerevan	+90 kg
Gold medal – first place	1999 Hong Kong	-80 kg

Bazigit Atavovich Atajev (Kumyk: Bozigit Atay Atawnu ulanı, Russian: Бозигит Атавович Атаев; born 3 December 1979) is a Russian mixed martial artist and sanshou kickboxer, who currently competes in the Light Heavyweight division. A professional since 2000, he has competed in RINGS and PRIDE Fighting Championships. He is known for a fierce spinning-heel kick and Sambo style grappling.

== Early life ==
Bozigit was born in 1979 in the village of Lower Kazanyshy to a Kumyk family. He studied in the famous Dagestan sports-dedicated boarding school "Five Directions of the World".

== Mixed martial arts career ==
Bozigit started his MMA career in 2000 knocking out Arunas Juskevicius at RINGS Lithuania: Bushido RINGS 1. The following year he won a 16 participant tournament "IAFC Pankration Russian Championship 2001". He got knocked out Roman Zentsov by a spinning wheel kick and Aaron Brink by a spinning back kick, and defeated Tsuyoshi Kohsaka by decision in the same year.

=== PRIDE Fighting Championships ===
Atajev debuted in PRIDE in December 2002 and suffered his only loss against Dutchman Alistair Overeem at PRIDE 24. Atajev planned to make his return to PRIDE at their final event PRIDE 34 against Gilbert Yvel. However, due to a stomach illness, the bout was cancelled.

=== Professional Fighters League ===
Atajev made his debut in North America on 21 June 2018 at PFL 2 against Dan Spohn in Light heavyweight tournaments. He lost the fight by technical knockout in the third round.

In his second fight in the tournament, Atajev faced Sean O'Connell at PFL 7 on 30 August 2018. He won the fight via TKO in the first round.

In the semifinals, Atajev faced Vinny Magalhaes, losing via first-round submission.

In 2019, Atajev fought Dan Spohn in a rematch at PFL 3, winning in via first-round knockout. On 8 August at PFL 6, Atajev fought Emiliano Sordi, losing via first-round knockout. He faced Sordi again in the quarterfinals of the 2019 tournament, losing via rear-naked choke submission in the first round.

== Wushu sanda ==
Bozigit Ataev is one of three five time Wushu Sanda world champions along with Muslim Salikhov and Mohsen Mohammadseifi. He won world championship in 1999, 2001, 2003, 2005, 2013 and earned silver medal in 2009

== Kickboxing ==
Bozigit took part in "BARS: Heavyweight Cup Of Gold BARS 2003" kickboxing tournament. He defeated Denis Grigoriev in first round but loss to Eduard Voznovich in final. In 2008, he faced the eventual K-1 champion Remy Bonjasky in his kickboxing debut. He was defeated by knockout early in the third round.

== Championships and accomplishments ==
- Russian Wushu Championships
  - Russian Wushu Champion
- World Wushu Championships
  - Five time World Champion
- International Absolute Fighting Council
  - IAFC Absolute Fighting Russian Championship Tournament Winner

== Mixed martial arts record ==
Professional record breakdown
26 matches	20 wins	5 losses
By knockout	15	3
By submission	4	2
By decision	1	0
Draws	1	

Res.	Record	Opponent	Method	Event	Date	Round	Time	Location	Notes
Loss	20–5–1	Emiliano Sordi	Submission (rear-naked choke)	PFL 9 (2019)	31 October 2019	1	4:26	Las Vegas, Nevada, United States	2019 PFL Light Heavyweight Tournament Semifinal.
Draw	20–4–1	Viktor Nemkov	Draw (majority)	PFL 9 (2019)	31 October 2019	2	5:00	Las Vegas, Nevada, United States	2019 PFL Light Heavyweight Tournament Quarterfinal.
Loss	20–4	Emiliano Sordi	KO (punches)	PFL 6 (2019)	8 August 2019	1	1:22	Atlantic City, New Jersey, United States	
Win	20–3	Dan Spohn	TKO (punches)	PFL 3 (2019)	6 June 2019	1	3:25	Uniondale, New York, United States	
Loss	19–3	Vinny Magalhães	Submission (kimura)	PFL 9 (2018)	13 October 2018	1	1:58	Long Beach, California, United States	2018 PFL Light Heavyweight Tournament Semifinal.
Win	19–2	Emiliano Sordi	TKO (punches)	PFL 9 (2018)	13 October 2018	1	1:43	Long Beach, California, United States	2018 PFL Light Heavyweight Tournament Quarterfinal.
Win	18–2	Sean O'Connell	TKO (spinning back kick and punches)	PFL 7 (2018)	30 August 2018	1	3:30	Atlantic City, New Jersey, United States	
Loss	17–2	Dan Spohn	TKO (punches)	PFL 2 (2018)	21 June 2018	3	4:31	Chicago, Illinois, United States	Light Heavyweight debut.
Win	17–1	Jeremy May	TKO (punches)	Kunlun Fight MMA 10	6 April 2017	1	2:15	Beijing, China	
Win	16–1	Valdas Pocevicius	KO (punches)	Bushido FC: Hero's Lithuania 2006	11 November 2006	1	2:02	Vilnius, Lithuania	
Win	15–1	Beneilton Pereira da Silva	TKO (punches)	RINGS Russia: CIS vs. The World	20 August 2005	1	1:03	Yekaterinburg, Russia	
Win	14–1	Mindaugas Kulikauskas	Submission (armbar)	Shooto Lithuania: King of Bushido Stage 1	14 November 2003	1	1:53	Vilnius, Lithuania	
Loss	13–1	Alistair Overeem	TKO (knee to the body)	Pride 24	23 December 2002	2	4:59	Fukuoka, Japan	
Win	13–0	Kestutis Arbocius	Submission (guillotine choke)	Bushido Rings 5: Shock	9 November 2002	2	2:58	Vilnius, Lithuania	
Win	12–0	Chris Franco	Submission (neck crank)	Shoot Boxing: S-Cup 2002	7 July 2002	1	2:31	Yokohama, Japan	
Win	11–0	Tsuyoshi Kohsaka	Decision (majority)	Rings: World Title Series 5	21 December 2001	3	5:00	Yokohama, Japan	
Win	10–0	Aaron Brink	KO (spinning back kick)	Rings: 10th Anniversary	11 August 2001	1	1:09	Tokyo, Japana	
Win	9–0	Maynard Marcum	KO (punch)	Rings: World Title Series 2	15 June 2001	1	1:08	Yokohama, Japan	
Win	8–0	Rolandas Digrys	Submission (armbar)	Rings Lithuania: Bushido Rings 2	8 May 2001	1	0:47	Vilnius, Lithuania	
Win	7–0	Dimitar Doichinov	TKO (punches)	Rings Russia: Russia vs. Bulgaria	6 April 2001	1	4:12	Yekaterinburg, Russia	
Win	6–0	Islam Dadalov	TKO (submission to knees and punches)	IAFC: Pankration Russian Championship 2001	8 February 2001	1	0:48	Yaroslavl, Russia	Won the IAFC Russian Cup Heavyweight Tournament.
Win	5–0	Vitali Shkraba	TKO (corner stoppage)	IAFC: Pankration Russian Championship 2001	8 February 2001	1	2:45	Yaroslavl, Russia	IAFC Russian Cup Heavyweight Tournament Semifinal.
Win	4–0	Yuri Zhernikov	TKO (submission to punches)	IAFC: Pankration Russian Championship 2001	8 February 2001	1	2:26	Yaroslavl, Russia	IAFC Russian Cup Heavyweight Tournament Quarterfinal.
Win	3–0	Tikhon Gladkov	TKO (punches)	IAFC: Pankration Russian Championship 2001	8 February 2001	1	1:41	Yaroslavl, Russia	IAFC Russian Cup Heavyweight Tournament Round of 16.
Win	2–0	Arunas Juskevicius	KO (punches)	Rings Lithuania: Bushido Rings 1	24 October 2000	1	0:14	Vilnius, Lithuania	
Win	1–0	Vasilin Bazhirov	TKO (punches)	Rings Russia: Russia vs. Bulgaria	21 May 2000	1	N/A	Tula, Russia	Heavyweight debut.

== Kickboxing record (incomplete) ==
Professional kickboxing record
1 wins, 2 loss, 0 draw
Date	Result	Opponent	Event	Location	Method	Round	Time	Record
2008-7-13	Loss	Remy Bonjasky	K-1 World GP 2008 in Taipei	Taipei City, Taiwan	KO (jumping knee strike)	3	2:17	1-2
2003-06-25	Loss	Eduard Voznovich	BARS: Heavyweight Cup Of Gold BARS 2003	Moscow, Russia	Decision	5	3:00	1-1
2003-06-25	Win	Denis Grigoriev	BARS: Heavyweight Cup Of Gold BARS 2003	Moscow, Russia	Decision	5	3:00	1-0

== See also ==
- List of male mixed martial artists
