= PFL 9 (2019) =

Professional Fighters League MMA event in 2019

- The poster for PFL 9
- Promotion: Professional Fighters League
- Date: October 31, 2019
- Venue: Mandalay Bay Events Center
- City: Las Vegas, Nevada

Event chronology
PFL 8	PFL 9	PFL 10

The PFL 9 mixed martial arts event for the 2019 season of the Professional Fighters League was held on October 31, 2019, at the Mandalay Bay Events Center in Las Vegas, Nevada.

== Background ==
The event was the ninth of the 2019 season and marked the start of the playoffs for the Heavyweight and Light Heavyweight divisions.

== Results ==
Main Card (ESPN2)
Weight class				Method	Round	Time	Notes
Heavyweight	Ali Isaev	def.	Denis Goltsov	TKO (punches)	3	4:59	(Note: Semi-final round bout of the 2019 PFL Heavyweight playoffs.)
Heavyweight	Jared Rosholt	def.	Kelvin Tiller	Decision (unanimous) (30–27, 30–27, 30–27)	3	5:00	(Note: Semi-final round bout of the 2019 PFL Heavyweight playoffs.)
Light Heavyweight	Emiliano Sordi	def.	Bazigit Atajev	Submission (rear-naked choke)	1	4:26	(Note: Semi-final round bout of the 2019 PFL Light Heavyweight playoffs.)
Light Heavyweight	Jordan Johnson	def.	Rashid Yusupov	Decision (unanimous) (30–26, 30–26, 29–27)	3	5:00	(Note: Semi-final round bout of the 2019 PFL Light Heavyweight playoffs.)
Heavyweight	Francimar Barroso	def.	Alex Nicholson	Decision (unanimous) (20–17, 19–18, 19–18)	2	5:00	(Note: Quarterfinal round bout of the 2019 PFL Heavyweight playoffs.)
Heavyweight	Denis Goltsov	def.	Satoshi Ishii	Decision (majority) (19–19, 20–18, 20–18)	2	5:00	(Note: Quarterfinal round bout of the 2019 PFL Heavyweight playoffs.)
Preliminary Card (ESPN+)
Heavyweight	Jared Rosholt	def.	Muhammed Dereese	TKO (punches)	1	3:41	(Note: Quarterfinal round bout of the 2019 PFL Heavyweight playoffs.)
Heavyweight	Ali Isaev	def.	Kelvin Tiller	Decision (unanimous) (20–16, 20–17, 20–17)	2	5:00	(Note: Quarterfinal round bout of the 2019 PFL Heavyweight playoffs.)
Light Heavyweight	Rashid Yusupov	def.	Vinny Magalhães	KO (punches)	1	2:46	(Note: Quarterfinal round bout of the 2019 PFL Light Heavyweight playoffs.)
Light Heavyweight	Maxim Grishin	vs.	Jordan Johnson	Draw (majority)	2	5:00	(Note: Quarterfinal round bout of the 2019 PFL Light Heavyweight playoffs.)
Light Heavyweight	Bazigit Atajev	vs.	Viktor Nemkov	Draw (majority)	2	5:00	(Note: Quarterfinal round bout of the 2019 PFL Light Heavyweight playoffs.)
Light Heavyweight	Emiliano Sordi	def.	Sigi Pesaleli	TKO (punches)	1	1:13	(Note: Quarterfinal round bout of the 2019 PFL Light Heavyweight playoffs.)

== 2019 PFL Heavyweight playoffs ==
Quarterfinals
1	(Russia) Denis Goltsov	MD 2
8	(Croatia) Satoshi Ishii	L
4	(United States) Kelvin Tiller	L
5	(Russia) Ali Isaev	UD 2
2	(United States) Muhammed Dereese	L
7	(United States) Jared Rosholt	TKO 1
3	(United States) Alex Nicholson	L
6	(Brazil) Francimar Barroso	UD 2

Semifinals
1	(Russia) Denis Goltsov	L
5	(Russia) Ali Isaev	TKO 3
7	(United States) Jared Rosholt	UD 3
4	(United States) Kelvin Tiller*	L

Finals
5	(Russia) Ali Isaev	TKO 4
7	(United States) Jared Rosholt	L

* Francimar Barroso was forced to withdraw from the competition due to being ruled “not healthy enough to continue.” Alex Nicholson was selected to take his spot in the heavyweight semifinals, but was also later ruled unfit to compete. Kelvin Tiller was eventually chosen to return to the competition to face Jared Rosholt.

Legend
(SD)	(Split Decision)
(UD)	(Unanimous Decision)
(MD)	(Majority Decision)
SUB	Submission
(T)KO	(Technical) Knock Out
L	Loss

== 2019 PFL Light Heavyweight playoffs ==
Quarterfinals
1	(Argentina) Emiliano Sordi	TKO 1
8	(New Zealand) Sigi Pesaleli	L
4	(Russia) Bazigit Atajev	Draw 2
5	(Russia) Viktor Nemkov	L
2	(Russia) Maxim Grishin	L
7	(United States) Jordan Johnson	Draw 2
3	(Brazil) Vinny Magalhães	L
6	(Russia) Rashid Yusupov	KO 1

Semifinals
1	(Argentina) Emiliano Sordi	SUB 1
4	(Russia) Bazigit Atajev	L
7	(United States) Jordan Johnson	UD 3
6	(Russia) Rashid Yusupov	L

Finals
1	(Argentina) Emiliano Sordi	TKO 1
7	(United States) Jordan Johnson	L

Legend
(SD)	(Split Decision)
(UD)	(Unanimous Decision)
(MD)	(Majority Decision)
SUB	Submission
(T)KO	(Technical) Knock Out
L	Loss

== See also ==
- List of PFL events
- List of current PFL fighters
