= Mikhail Mokhnatkin =

Russian sambist

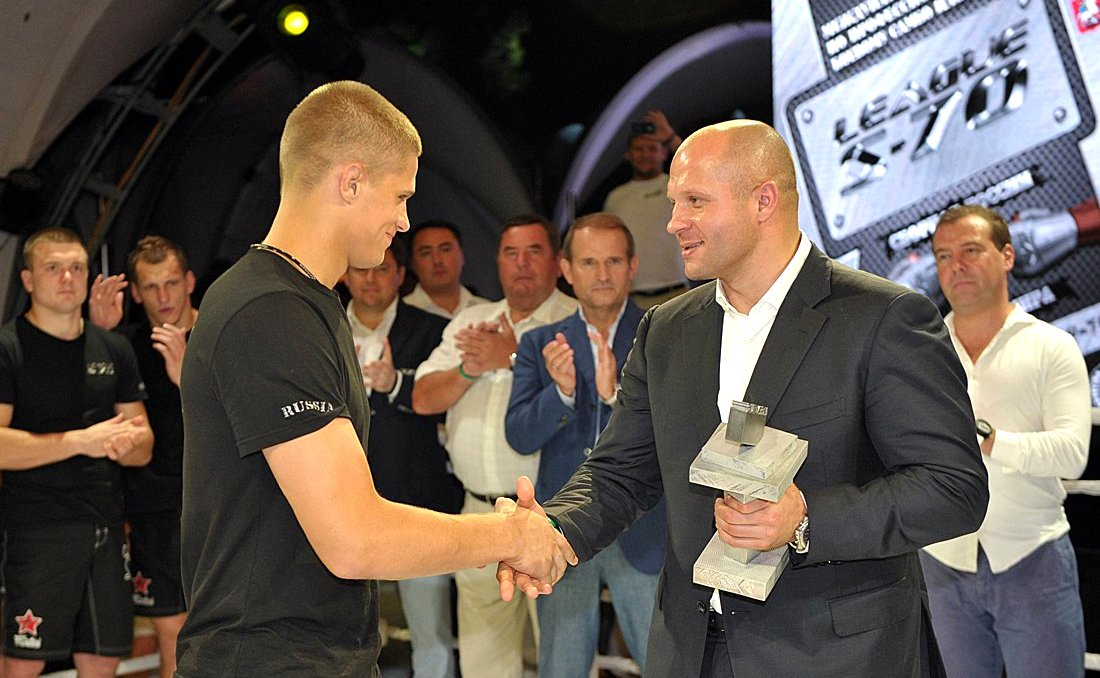
- Mokhnatkin meeting Fedor Emelianenko in 2013
- Born: Mikhail Aleksandrovich Mokhnatkin; 16 January 1990 (age 36); Leningrad Oblast, Soviet Union
- Nationality: Russian
- Height: 1.87 m (6 ft 2 in)
- Weight: 94 kg (207 lb)
- Team: Fight Nights Team
- Years active: 2010–present

Mixed martial arts record
- Total: 25
- Wins: 16
- By knockout: 6
- By submission: 4
- By decision: 6
- Losses: 7
- By knockout: 3
- By submission: 1
- By decision: 3
- Draws: 2

Other information
- Mixed martial arts record from Sherdog

Mikhail Mokhnatkin (Russian: Михаил Александрович Мохнаткин; born 16 January 1990) is a Russian mixed martial artist and Combat Sambo practitioner.

He was married to world-class sambist Marina Mokhnatkina.

== Mixed martial arts record ==
Professional record breakdown
25 matches	16 wins	7 losses
By knockout	6	3
By submission	4	1
By decision	6	3
Draws	2	

Res.	Record	Opponent	Method	Event	Date	Round	Time	Location	Notes
Loss	16–7–2	Vladimir Daineko	TKO (punches)	Ural FC 11	May 15, 2026	1	0:40	Moscow, Russia	
Win	16–6–2	Ruslan Magomedov	TKO (knee injury)	Ural FC x Ozon: Akhmedov vs. Cavaleiro	October 17, 2025	1	5:00	Kaspiysk, Russia	Return to Heavyweight.
Loss	15–6–2	Faridun Odilov	TKO (punches)	ACA 168	December 24, 2023	3	1:30	Moscow, Russia	2023 ACA Light Heavyweight Grand Prix Semifinal.
Win	15–5–2	Oleg Olenichev	Decision (unanimous)	ACA 158	June 2, 2023	5	5:00	Saint Petersburg, Russia	Return to Light Heavyweight. 2023 ACA Light Heavyweight Grand Prix Quarterfinal.
Win	14–5–2	Vinicius Moreira	Decision (unanimous)	Open FC 15	December 19, 2021	3	5:00	Moscow, Russia	
Win	13–5–2	Ricardo Prasel	Decision (unanimous)	UAE Warriors 22	September 4, 2021	3	5:00	Abu Dhabi, United Arab Emirates	Return to Heavyweight.
Win	12–5–2	Fábio Marongiu	TKO (punches)	Leon Warriors Fighting League: Stage 1	May 30, 2020	1	4:06	Minsk, Belarus	
Loss	11–5–2	Maxim Grishin	KO (punch)	PFL 6 (2019)	August 8, 2019	1	0:48	Atlantic City, New Jersey, United States	
Loss	11–4–2	Rashid Yusupov	Decision (unanimous)	PFL 3 (2019)	June 6, 2019	3	5:00	Uniondale, New York, United States	Return to Light Heavyweight.
Loss	11–3–2	Francimar Barroso	Decision (unanimous)	RCC 5	December 15, 2018	3	5:00	Yekaterinburg, Russia	
Win	11–2–2	Kleber Silva	TKO (retirement)	RCC 3	July 9, 2018	1	5:00	Yekaterinburg, Russia	Catchweight (220 lb) bout.
Win	10–2–2	Derrick Mehmen	Decision (unanimous)	Fight Nights Global 75	October 6, 2017	3	5:00	Saint Petersburg, Russia	
Loss	9–2–2	Sergei Pavlovich	Decision (unanimous)	Fight Nights Global 68	June 2, 2017	5	5:00	Saint Petersburg, Russia	FNG Heavyweight Grand Prix Final. For the inaugural FNG Heavyweight Championship.
Win	9–1–2	Fábio Maldonado	Decision (unanimous)	Fight Nights Global 52	October 1, 2016	3	5:00	Nizhnevartovsk, Russia	FNG Heavyweight Grand Prix Semifinal.
Draw	8–1–2	Alexei Kudin	Draw	Fight Nights Global 46	April 29, 2016	3	5:00	Krylatskoe, Russia	Return to Heavyweight.
Win	8–1–1	Ednaldo Oliveira	Submission (scarf hold armlock)	Fight Nights Global 42	October 23, 2015	1	4:50	Saint Petersburg, Russia	Catchweight (209 lb) bout.
Win	7–1–1	Donald Njatah Nya	Submission (rear-naked choke)	Fight Nights Global 40	July 31, 2015	2	4:34	Sochi, Russia	Catchweight (209 lb) bout.
Draw	6–1–1	Jiří Procházka	Draw (majority)	Fight Nights: Battle of Moscow 18	December 20, 2014	3	5:00	Moscow, Russia	
Win	6–1	Evgeni Guryanov	TKO (punches)	Fight Nights: Battle of Moscow 17	September 30, 2014	1	1:03	Moscow, Russia	Catchweight (206.6 lb) bout; Mokhnatkin missed weight.
Win	5–1	Pavel Tretyakov	TKO (punches)	Fight Nights: Battle of Moscow 16	July 11, 2014	1	1:42	Moscow, Russia	
Win	4–1	Valentijn Overeem	TKO (submission to punches)	Fight Nights: Battle of Moscow 14	December 7, 2013	1	4:45	Moscow, Russia	Heavyweight bout.
Win	3–1	Nikolai Alexiev	Submission (rear-naked choke)	League S-70: Plotforma Cup 2013	August 17, 2013	3	3:38	Sochi, Russia	
Win	2–1	Igor Sliusarchuk	Submission (rear-naked choke)	Global Fight Club 2	June 2, 2013	1	3:03	Krasnodar, Russia	Light Heavyweight debut.
Win	1–1	Artur Astakhov	Decision (unanimous)	Lion's Fights 1	March 3, 2012	2	5:00	Saint Petersburg, Russia	
Loss	0–1	Murad Chachanov	Submission (rear-naked choke)	Northwest League of Combat Sambo: Tournament in Memory of Marshal Govorov 2010	December 25, 2010	1	1:20	Saint Petersburg, Russia	Heavyweight debut.
