= Kelvin Tiller =

American mixed martial arts fighter

- Born: June 26, 1990 (age 36); Kansas City, Kansas, United States
- Other names: The Mama's Boy
- Height: 6 ft 0 in (1.83 m)
- Weight: 265 lb (120 kg; 18.9 st)
- Division: Heavyweight; Light Heavyweight
- Reach: 74.0 in (188 cm)
- Fighting out of: Topeka, Kansas, United States
- Team: Midwest Combat Academy / Woodward Striking
- Years active: 2011–present

Mixed martial arts record
- Total: 17
- Wins: 12
- By knockout: 4
- By submission: 7
- By decision: 1
- Losses: 5
- By submission: 1
- By decision: 4

Other information
- Mixed martial arts record from Sherdog

Kelvin Tiller (born June 26, 1990) is an American mixed martial artist currently competing in the light heavyweight division. A professional competitor since 2011, Tiller has also formerly competed for Bellator, World Series of Fighting and Shark Fights.

== Background ==
Born and raised in Kansas, Tiller was often involved in street fights while growing up and also briefly trained in boxing and karate. Tiller later attended Highland Park High School where he competed in track and won a city championship for the 100-meter dash in his senior year.

== Mixed martial arts career ==
=== Early career ===
Tiller competed as an amateur from 2009 until 2011, compiling a record of 7–3. On September 10, 2011, Tiller made his professional MMA debut against Jeb Chiles at Shark Fights 19. Tiller won the fight by submission at the end of the first round.

=== Bellator ===
Tiller made his Bellator debut on October 29, 2011, at Bellator 56 against Daniel Spohn. Tiller defeated Spohn via split decision.

In his next appearance for Bellator, Tiller faced Jeremiah Riggs at Bellator 70 on May 25, 2012. Tiller won the fight by submission in the third round.

Tiller then stepped in as a replacement for an injured Marcus "Lelo" Aurelio and defeated Amaechi Oselukwue via second-round TKO at Bellator 73 on August 24, 2012.

Tiller was expected to face Dave Vitkay at Bellator 88 on February 7, 2013. However, when Tiller failed to make weight for the third consecutive time, the bout was cancelled and Tiller was subsequently released from his Bellator contract.

=== Post-Bellator ===
After parting ways with Bellator, Tiller faced Chris Henning on June 29, 2013, at Epic Fight Night 1: Stinson vs. Kimmons. Tiller won via submission in round one.

=== World Series of Fighting/ Professional Fighters League ===
In November 2013, Tiller signed a multi-fight deal with World Series of Fighting.

Tiller was scheduled to face Ronny Markes at WSOF 12 on August 9, 2014, but when Krasimir Mladenov pulled out of his fight with Elvis Mutapčić due to injury on the same card, Tiller stepped in as a replacement. As a result, Markes ended up fighting promotional newcomer Cully Butterfield. Tiller was handed his first professional defeat by Mutapcic via three-round unanimous decision.

Following his first loss, Tiller rebounded with a win against Marcus Sursa by submission via a rear-naked choke at Shamrock FC: Heavy Artillery on March 7, 2015, in Kansas City, Missouri, United States. His win streak continued against Kevin Ray Sears by TKO due to punches at Shamrock FC 282 on January 14, 2017, which marked his heavyweight debut.

==== 2018 Season ====
Later, he make his PFL debut against Caio Alencar, winning by knockout at PFL 1 on June 7, 2018, in New York City, New York. This was followed by a win against Jared Rosholt by guillotine choke at PFL 4 on July 19, 2018, in Uniondale, New York.

However, his winning streak ended when he rematched Jared Rosholt, losing by unanimous decision at PFL 8 on October 5, 2018, in New Orleans, Louisiana, which was the 2018 PFL Heavyweight Quarterfinal bout.

==== 2019 Season ====
He bounced back with a win against Muhammed Dereese by kimura in the first round at PFL 3 on June 6, 2019, in Uniondale, New York.

Unfortunately, his career took a downturn with three consecutive losses. First, he was defeated by Denis Goltsov via ezekiel choke at PFL 6 on August 8, 2019, in Atlantic City, New Jersey. Then, he lost to Ali Isaev by unanimous decision in the 2019 PFL Heavyweight Quarterfinal bout. His third consecutive loss was against Jared Rosholt by unanimous decision at PFL 9 on October 31, 2019, in Las Vegas, Nevada. This was the 2019 PFL Heavyweight Semifinal bout, where he replaced the injured Francimar Barroso.

=== Post PFL ===
Tiller, as a replacement for Steve Mowry, was scheduled to face Marcelo Golm on August 20, 2021, at Bellator 265. The week of the event, Tiller had to pull out of the bout due to undisclosed reasons.

Despite the string of losses, he managed to pull off a win against Rudy Schaffroth by KO with a knee at Tuff-N-Uff 129 on August 12, 2022, in Las Vegas, Nevada.

== Personal life ==
Tiller went to Topeka High high school and Highland Park High in Topeka, Ks after high school he went to Allen County Community College for track. He was raised by a single mother Patricia Rains as they moves around between Kansas City and Topeka most of his childhood. He is the youngest of 4 children and has 3 older sisters Patricia (Nikki) Tiller, Tierra Tiller, and Autumn Tiller. He has always been a family oriented man with his Grandmother ( Ellenor Irons) Grandfather (Harrison Irons Sr.) and Uncle (Harrison (Dunnie) Irons Jr.) helping with his up bringing . Tiller himself has 3 sons and 4 daughters having his first child at the age of 16. While growing up on the streets of Topeka he had to grow up fast so fighting became natural for him. His mission in life is to make sure his family is taken care of. On October 4, 2018, Tiller lost a major factor in his life, the man that thought him everything in life his grandfather Harrison Irons Sr. the day before his October 5 fight for PFL. Tiller is a major influencer in his community. He mentors the young kids, telling them that there is more out there in life; and that you can be what ever you want to be in life as long as you put your all into it.

== Mixed martial arts record ==
Professional record breakdown
17 matches	12 wins	5 losses
By knockout	4	0
By submission	7	1
By decision	1	4

Res.	Record	Opponent	Method	Event	Date	Round	Time	Location	Notes
Win	12–5	Rudy Schaffroth	KO (knee)	Tuff-N-Uff 129	August 12, 2022	3	0:39	Las Vegas, Nevada, United States	
Loss	11–5	Jared Rosholt	Decision (unanimous)	PFL 9 (2019)	October 31, 2019	3	5:00	Las Vegas, Nevada, United States	2019 PFL Heavyweight Tournament Semifinal.
Loss	11–4	Ali Isaev	Decision (unanimous)	PFL 9 (2019)	October 31, 2019	2	5:00	Las Vegas, Nevada, United States	2019 PFL Heavyweight Tournament Quarterfinal.
Loss	11–3	Denis Goltsov	Submission (Ezekiel choke)	PFL 6 (2019)	August 8, 2019	2	3:40	Atlantic City, New Jersey, United States	
Win	11–2	Muhammed Dereese	Submission (kimura)	PFL 3 (2019)	June 6, 2019	1	3:22	Uniondale, New York, United States	
Loss	10–2	Jared Rosholt	Decision (unanimous)	PFL 8 (2018)	October 5, 2018	2	5:00	New Orleans, Louisiana, United States	2018 PFL Heavyweight Tournament Quarterfinal.
Win	10–1	Jared Rosholt	Submission (guillotine choke)	PFL 4 (2018)	July 19, 2018	2	0:54	Uniondale, New York, United States	
Win	9–1	Caio Alencar	KO (punch)	PFL 1 (2018)	June 7, 2018	1	4:34	New York City, New York, United States	
Win	8–1	Kevin Ray Sears	TKO (punches)	Shamrock FC 282	January 14, 2017	1	2:17	Kansas City, Missouri, United States	Heavyweight debut.
Win	7–1	Marcus Sursa	Submission (rear-naked choke)	Shamrock FC: Heavy Artillery	March 7, 2015	2	2:57	Kansas City, Missouri, United States	
Loss	6–1	Elvis Mutapčić	Decision (unanimous)	WSOF 12	August 9, 2014	3	5:00	Las Vegas, Nevada, United States	Catchweight (195 lb) bout.
Win	6–0	Chris Henning	Submission (rear-naked choke)	Epic Fight Night 1: Stinson vs. Kimmons	June 29, 2013	1	4:57	Kansas City, Missouri, United States	
Win	5–0	Amaechi Oselukwue	TKO (punches)	Bellator 73	August 24, 2012	2	4:21	Tunica Resorts, Mississippi, United States	Catchweight (179 lb) bout.
Win	4–0	Jeremiah Riggs	Technical Submission (kimura)	Bellator 70	May 25, 2012	3	3:38	New Orleans, Louisiana, United States	Catchweight (190 lb) bout.
Win	3–0	Jake Collier	Submission (triangle choke)	Fight Me MMA	January 13, 2012	1	4:40	St. Charles, Missouri, United States	
Win	2–0	Daniel Spohn	Decision (split)	Bellator 56	October 29, 2011	3	5:00	Kansas City, Kansas, United States	Light Heavyweight debut.
Win	1–0	Jeb Chiles	Submission (armbar)	Shark Fights 19	September 10, 2011	1	4:14	Independence, Missouri, United States	Catchweight (191 lb) bout.
