= Denis Goltsov =

Russian sambist, mixed martial arts (MMA) fighter, and former amateur boxer

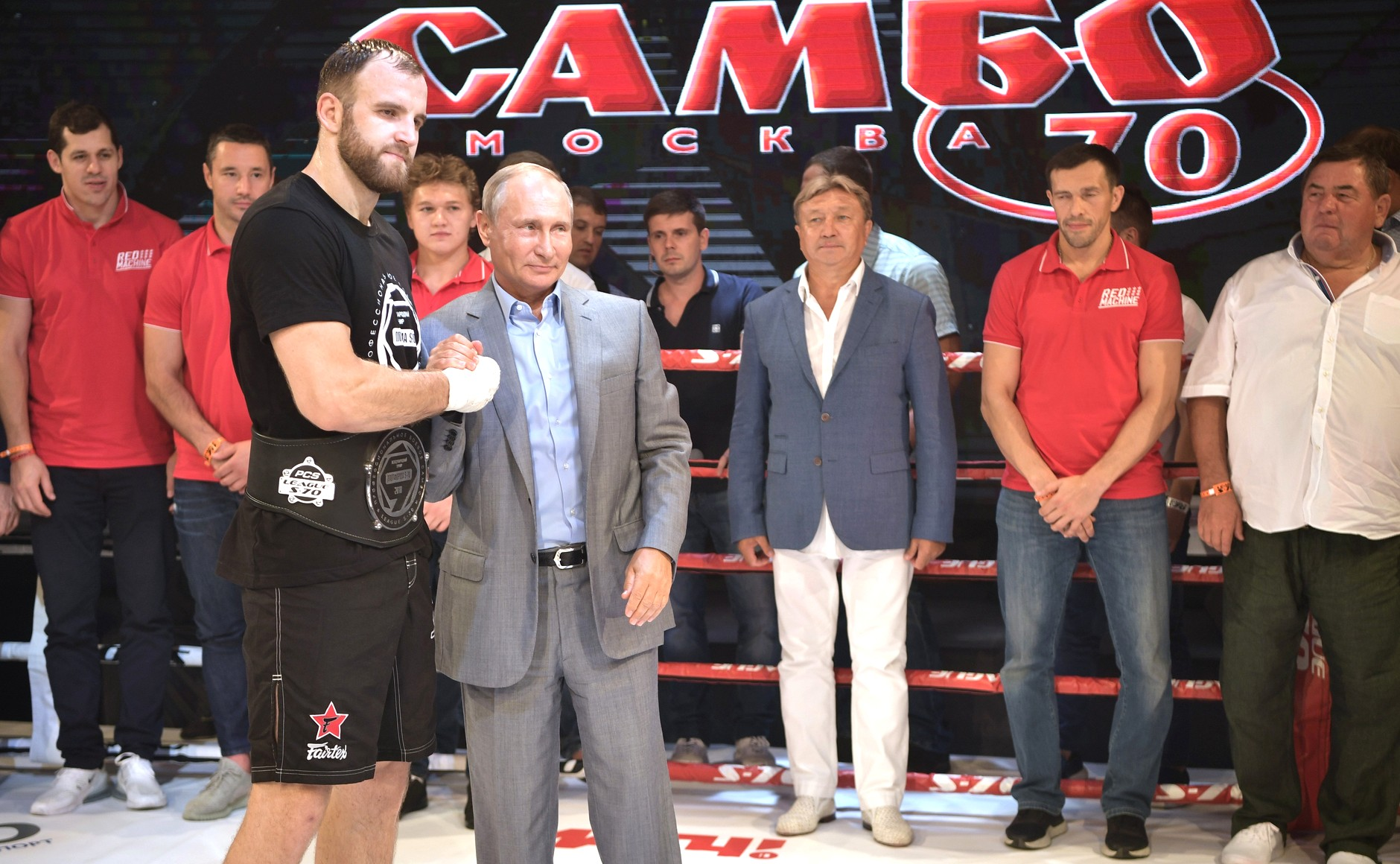
- Born: Denis Alexandrovich Goltsov; 10 June 1990 (age 36); Leningrad, Russian SFSR, Soviet Union
- Native name: Денис Александрович Гольцов
- Other names: The Russian Bogatyr
- Nationality: Russian
- Height: 6 ft 5 in (1.96 m)
- Weight: 246 lb (112 kg; 17 st 8 lb)
- Division: Heavyweight
- Style: Combat Sambo
- Fighting out of: Saint Petersburg, Russia
- Team: Sambo-Piter
- Rank: Master of Sport in Boxing Honored Master of Sports of Russia in Sambo
- Years active: 2010–present

Mixed martial arts record
- Total: 47
- Wins: 38
- By knockout: 20
- By submission: 12
- By decision: 6
- Losses: 9
- By knockout: 5
- By submission: 3
- By decision: 1

Other information
- Mixed martial arts record from Sherdog

Denis Alexandrovich Goltsov (Russian: Денис Александрович Гольцов; born 10 June 1990) is a Russian sambo competitor, mixed martial artist, and former amateur boxer. As a sambist, Goltsov is a two-time world champion, two-time European champion, and three-time Russian champion. As a mixed martial artist, he is currently signed to the MMA promotion Professional Fighters League (PFL) in the heavyweight division, and was the 2024 PFL Heavyweight Champion. As of August 21, 2026, he is #2 in the PFL heavyweight rankings.

== Sambo career ==
Denis Goltsov, originally from St. Petersburg, grew up in a sports-oriented family, though he initially lacked interest in team sports. At 15, inspired by his brother Sergei’s boxing trainer, he took up boxing and eventually earned a Master of Sport in the discipline, placing second in the national youth championship.

Goltsov studied geology at Saint Petersburg State University but shifted his focus to combat sambo, joining a gym that specialized in mixed martial arts (MMA). His transition was highly successful: within three and a half years, he became the European champion in MMA and continued to secure victories on both national and international stages, making MMA his primary career by 2021.

In sambo, Goltsov won 11 Russian championship medals, including three gold. He earned European Championship gold in 2012 and 2017 and achieved World Championship gold in 2016 and 2017, along with a silver medal in 2021. At the World Sambo Championships, Goltsov won the gold medal in 2016 and 2017 and the silver medal in 2021.

== Mixed martial arts career ==
=== Early career ===
In 2010, Denis made his debut in M-1 Global, later moving to ProFC. Although facing the first defeat of his career, he continued to persevere, maintaining a 5-4 record across both leagues. His journey took him through various organizations until he found success in Tech-Krep FC, where he scored four consecutive victories. These wins positioned him as the top contender for the championship belt.

Denis's pinnacle moment came on December 18, 2016, when he secured the ACA Heavyweight Championship by defeating Salimgerey Rasulov. However, his reign was short-lived, as he lost the title in the following match against Mukhumat Vakhaev. Despite setbacks, Denis rebounded, participating in fights in organizations such as RCC and League S-70. Eventually, he received an invitation to join the Professional Fighters League (PFL), signaling a new chapter in his MMA journey.

=== Professional Fighters League ===
==== 2019 season ====
Goltsov made his PFL debut against Jared Rosholt on June 6, 2019, at PFL 3. He won the bout via TKO stoppage in the first round.

Goltsov faced Kelvin Tiller at PFL 6 on August 8, 2019, in Atlantic City, New Jersey. He won the bout via ezekiel choke in the second round.

Goltsov faced Satoshi Ishii in the 2019 heavyweight quarterfinal bout at PFL 9 on October 31, 2019. He won the fight by majority decision. Heading into the semifinals, Goltsov faced Ali Isaev later in the night. He lost the bout in the third round by technical knockout.

==== 2021 season ====
Goltsov faced Muhammed DeReese at PFL 3 on May 6, 2021. He had originally been scheduled to face Justin Willis on the card, but Willis was pulled from the bout after the weigh-ins due to being not medically cleared and replaced by DeReese. Goltsov won the bout via first-round technical knockout.

Goltsov faced Brandon Sayles on June 25, 2021, at PFL 6. He won the bout by first-round technical knockout.

Goltsov faced Ante Delija on August 19, 2021, at PFL 8. He lost the belt by unanimous decision.

==== 2022 season ====
Goltsov was scheduled to face Sam Kei on April 28, 2022, at PFL 2. However, Kei would later pull out of the bout and was replaced by Cody Goodale. Goltsov won the bout via first-round TKO.

Goltsov faced Maurice Greene on June 24, 2022, at PFL 5. He won the bout via unanimous decision, having out-wrestled Greene throughout the bout.

Goltsov was scheduled to face on 2021 PFL Champion Bruno Cappelozza on August 13, 2022, at PFL 8. However, after picking up an injury, Cappelozza was unable to continue in the tournament and replaced by Matheus Scheffel. After visa issues forced Goltsov to pull out of his bout due to visa issues, he was replaced by Juan Adams.

==== 2023 season ====
Ante Delija was scheduled to face Yorgan De Castro on April 7, 2023, at PFL 2. However, Delija pulled out due to injury and was replaced by Goltsov. In turn, Goltsov withdrew from the bout and was replaced by Danilo Marques.

Goltsov faced Cezar Ferreira on April 14, 2023, at PFL 3. He won the bout in the first round by knockout via ground and pound.

Goltsov faced Yorgan De Castro on June 16, 2023, at PFL 5. He won the bout by knockout just 18 seconds into the first round.

In the semi-finals, Goltsov faced Jordan Heiderman on August 18, 2023, at PFL 8. He won the fight by arm-triangle choke in the first round.

In the final, Goltsov faced Renan Ferreira on November 24, 2023, at PFL 10. He lost the bout by second-round TKO.

==== 2024 season ====
Goltsov faced Linton Vassell at PFL 1 on April 4, 2024 and won the fight by technical knockout.

Goltsov was expected to face Sergei Bilostenniy at PFL 4 on June 13, 2024. However, Bilostenniy was removed from the fight for unknown reasons and was replaced by Thiago Santos. Goltsov won the bout via TKO in the first round.

Goltsov next faced Timothy Johnson in the semifinals of the 2024 Heavyweight tournament at PFL 7 on August 2, 2024. He won the bout via TKO in the first round.

Goltsov next faced Oleg Popov in the finals of the 2024 Heavyweight tournament at PFL 10 on November 29, 2024 and won the tournament via a triangle choke submission in the first round.

==== 2025 ====
Goltsov faced Corey Anderson at PFL Champions Series 2 on July 19, 2025, and lost the bout via technical knockout in the second round.

==== 2026 ====
Goltsov was scheduled to face Hasan Mezhiev on July 25, 2026, at PFL Washington DC. However, the bout was removed from the event for unknown reasons. The bout was re-scheduled and eventually took place on August 7, 2026, at PFL Charlotte. Goltsov won the fight via knockout with the opening minute of the first round.

Goltsov was scheduled to face Maxwell Djantou Nana on October 16, 2026, at PFL Chicago 2. However, the bout was removed from the event for unknown reasons and eventually took place on November 14, 2026, at PFL Returns to Dubai. Goltsov won the fight by technical knockout in the first round.

== Championships and accomplishments ==
=== Mixed martial arts ===
- Professional Fighters League
  - 2024 PFL Heavyweight Championship
- Absolute Championship Akhmat
  - ACA Heavyweight Championship (One time)
- Tech-KREP FC
  - Tech-KREP FC Heavyweight Championship (One time)
    - Three Successful title defenses
- MMA Fighting
  - 2024 First Team MMA All-Star

=== Sambo ===
- Fédération Internationale de Sambo (FIAS)
  - Sambo World Champion (2 times)
  - Sambo European Champion (2 times)
  - Russian National Champion (3 times)

=== Amateur boxing ===
- Russian Boxing Federation
- (silver) 2008 Anapa Russian Junior National Championships (+91 kg)

== Mixed martial arts record ==
Professional record breakdown
47 matches	38 wins	9 losses
By knockout	20	5
By submission	12	3
By decision	6	1

Res.	Record	Opponent	Method	Event	Date	Round	Time	Location	Notes
Win	38–9	Maxwell Djantou Nana	TKO (punches)	PFL Dubai: Nemkov vs. Bilostenniy	November 14, 2026	1	3:41	Dubai, United Arab Emirates	
Win	37–9	Hasan Mezhiev	TKO (head kick and punches)	PFL Charlotte: Battle vs. Rosta	August 7, 2026	1	0:52	Charlotte, North Carolina, United States	
Loss	36–9	Corey Anderson	TKO (elbows)	PFL Champions Series 2	July 19, 2025	2	3:28	Cape Town, South Africa	
Win	36–8	Oleg Popov	Technical Submission (triangle choke)	PFL 10 (2024)	November 29, 2024	1	2:55	Riyadh, Saudi Arabia	Won the 2024 PFL Heavyweight Tournament.
Win	35–8	Timothy Johnson	TKO (punches)	PFL 7 (2024)	August 2, 2024	1	2:26	Nashville, Tennessee, United States	2024 PFL Heavyweight Tournament Semifinal.
Win	34–8	Thiago Santos	TKO (punches)	PFL 4 (2024)	June 13, 2024	1	2:22	Uncasville, Connecticut, United States	
Win	33–8	Linton Vassell	TKO (punches)	PFL 1 (2024)	April 4, 2024	3	3:11	San Antonio, Texas, United States	
Loss	32–8	Renan Ferreira	TKO (punches)	PFL 10 (2023)	November 24, 2023	2	0:26	Washington, D.C., United States	2023 PFL Heavyweight Tournament Final.
Win	32–7	Jordan Heiderman	Submission (arm-triangle choke)	PFL 8 (2023)	August 18, 2023	1	4:16	New York City, New York, United States	2023 PFL Heavyweight Tournament Semifinal.
Win	31–7	Yorgan De Castro	KO (punch)	PFL 5 (2023)	June 16, 2023	1	0:18	Atlanta, Georgia, United States	
Win	30–7	Cezar Ferreira	KO (punches)	PFL 3 (2023)	April 14, 2023	1	2:07	Las Vegas, Nevada, United States	
Win	29–7	Maurice Greene	Decision (unanimous)	PFL 5 (2022)	June 24, 2022	3	5:00	Atlanta, Georgia, United States	
Win	28–7	Cody Goodale	TKO (punches)	PFL 2 (2022)	April 28, 2022	1	3:20	Arlington, Texas, United States	
Loss	27–7	Ante Delija	Decision (unanimous)	PFL 8 (2021)	August 19, 2021	3	5:00	Hollywood, Florida, United States	2021 PFL Heavyweight Tournament Semifinal.
Win	27–6	Brandon Sayles	TKO (punches)	PFL 6 (2021)	June 25, 2021	3	1:24	Atlantic City, New Jersey, United States	
Win	26–6	Muhammed DeReese	TKO (punches)	PFL 3 (2021)	May 6, 2021	1	4:21	Atlantic City, New Jersey, United States	
Loss	25–6	Ali Isaev	TKO (punches)	PFL 9 (2019)	October 31, 2019	3	4:59	Las Vegas, Nevada, United States	2019 PFL Heavyweight Tournament Semifinal.
Win	25–5	Satoshi Ishii	Decision (majority)	PFL 9 (2019)	October 31, 2019	2	5:00	Las Vegas, Nevada, United States	2019 PFL Heavyweight Tournament Quarterfinal.
Win	24–5	Kelvin Tiller	Submission (Ezekiel choke)	PFL 6 (2019)	August 8, 2019	2	3:40	Atlantic City, New Jersey, United States	
Win	23–5	Jared Rosholt	TKO (punches)	PFL 3 (2019)	June 6, 2019	1	2:03	Uniondale, New York, United States	
Win	22–5	Ednaldo Oliveira	Submission (brabo choke)	S-70: Plotforma Cup 2018	August 22, 2018	2	4:51	Sochi, Russia	
Win	21–5	Atanas Djambazov	Submission (Ezekiel choke)	RCC 2	February 25, 2018	1	4:59	Yekaterinburg, Russia	
Win	20–5	Chase Gormley	KO (punch)	ACB 77	December 23, 2017	2	2:16	Moscow, Russia	
Loss	19–5	Mukhomad Vakhaev	TKO (submission to punches)	ACB 67	August 19, 2017	4	1:57	Grozny, Russia	Lost the ACB Heavyweight Championship.
Win	19–4	Salimgerey Rasulov	Decision (unanimous)	ACB 50	December 18, 2016	5	5:00	Saint Petersburg, Russia	Won the ACB Heavyweight Championship.
Win	18–4	Paul Buentello	KO (head kick)	ACB 41	July 15, 2016	1	3:07	Sochi, Russia	
Win	17–4	Mike Kyle	Technical Submission (triangle choke)	ACB 32	March 26, 2016	1	2:18	Moscow, Russia	
Win	16–4	John Hawk	TKO (punches)	Tech-Krep FC: Prime Selection 7	October 9, 2015	1	2:14	Krasnodar, Russia	Defended the Tech-KREP FC Heavyweight Championship.
Win	15–4	James McSweeney	TKO (head kick and punches)	Tech-Krep FC: Prime Selection 4	July 24, 2015	2	0:46	Krasnodar, Russia	Defended the Tech-Krep FC Heavyweight Championship.
Win	14–4	Peter Graham	Submission (kimura)	Tech-Krep FC: Ermak Prime Challenge	April 3, 2015	2	3:23	Krasnodar, Russia	Defended the Tech-Krep FC Heavyweight Championship.
Win	13–4	Zoumana Cisse	Submission (armbar)	Tech-Krep FC: Battle of Heroes	December 12, 2014	1	4:04	Saint Petersburg, Russia	Won the vacant Tech-Krep FC Heavyweight Championship.
Win	12–4	Brett Rogers	Decision (unanimous)	Tech-Krep FC: Prime 3	September 19, 2014	3	5:00	Krasnodar, Russia	
Win	11–4	Roy Boughton	Decision (unanimous)	Tech-Krep FC: Prime Crimea	May 23, 2014	3	5:00	Simferopol, Crimea	
Win	10–4	Ivo Skopljak	Submission (armbar)	Tech-Krep FC: Prime 1	March 21, 2014	1	1:50	Krasnodar, Russia	
Win	9–4	Szymon Bajor	KO (punch)	Union of Veterans: Cup of Champions 2013	December 21, 2013	2	4:07	Novosibirsk, Russia	
Win	8–4	Dritan Barjamaj	Submission (guillotine choke)	S-70: Plotforma Cup 2013	August 17, 2013	1	1:00	Sochi, Russia	
Win	7–4	Tadas Rimkevičius	TKO (punches)	Global Fight Club 1	December 14, 2012	1	1:25	Novorossiysk, Russia	
Win	6–4	Yuri Gorbenko	KO (head kick)	Lion's Fights 2	September 2, 2012	2	0:58	Kolpino, Russia	
Loss	5–4	Akhmed Sultanov	Submission (heel hook)	M-1 Global: Fedor vs. Rizzo	June 21, 2012	1	1:28	Saint Petersburg, Russia	
Win	5–3	Konstantin Erokhin	KO (backfist)	League S-70: Russian Grand Prix 2011 3rd Round	April 6, 2012	3	1:40	Moscow, Russia	
Win	4–3	Teymur Aslanov	Submission (triangle choke)	M-1 Challenge 29	November 19, 2011	1	1:55	Ufa, Russia	
Loss	3–3	Alexander Volkov	TKO (punches)	M-1 Challenge 25	April 28, 2011	2	3:05	Saint Petersburg, Russia	
Loss	3–2	Dmitry Poberezhets	Submission (rear-naked choke)	ProFC 26: Union Nation Cup 14	April 9, 2011	2	1:54	Rostov-on-Don, Russia	
Win	3–1	Ilya Dzhadugishvili	TKO (punches)	ProFC 25: Union Nation Cup 13	February 13, 2011	1	1:26	Kharkiv, Ukraine	
Loss	2–1	Ibragim Ibragimov	Submission (heel hook)	ProFC 23: Union Nation Cup 11	December 25, 2010	1	4:35	Babruysk, Belarus	
Win	2–0	Marat Aliaskhabov	Submission (straight armbar)	M-1 Challenge 21	October 28, 2010	1	4:56	Saint Petersburg, Russia	
Win	1–0	Igor Kukurudziak	Decision (unanimous)	M-1: Battle On The Neva 4	August 19, 2010	3	5:00	Saint Petersburg, Russia	Heavyweight debut.
