= PFL 6 (2019) =

Professional Fighters League mixed martial arts event in 2019

- The poster for PFL 6
- Promotion: Professional Fighters League
- Date: August 8, 2019
- Venue: Ocean Resort Casino
- City: Atlantic City, New Jersey

Event chronology
PFL 5	PFL 6	PFL 7

The PFL 6 mixed martial arts event for the 2019 season of the Professional Fighters League was held on August 8, 2019, at the Ocean Resort Casino in Atlantic City, New Jersey. This was the sixth and final regular season event of 2019 before the playoffs and include fights in the light heavyweight and heavyweight divisions.

== Background ==
A scheduled Light Heavyweight bout between Dan Spohn and Ronny Markes was cancelled after Markes weighed in at 208.6 pounds, 2.6 pounds over the allowable limit for the division. As a result, Spohn advanced with three points with a walkover win.

== Results ==
Main Card (ESPN+)
Weight class				Method	Round	Time	Notes
Heavyweight	Jared Rosholt	def.	Satoshi Ishii	Decision (unanimous) (30-27, 29-28, 29-28)	3	5:00
Light Heavyweight	Vinny Magalhães	def.	Rakim Cleveland	Submission (armbar)	1	1:56
Light Heavyweight	Viktor Nemkov	def.	Rashid Yusupov	Decision (split) (29-28, 28-29, 29-28)	3	5:00
Heavyweight	Ali Isaev	def.	Carl Seumanutafa	Decision (unanimous) (30-27, 30-27, 29-28)	3	5:00
Light Heavyweight	Maxim Grishin	def.	Mikhail Mokhnatkin	KO (punch)	1	0:48
Heavyweight	Muhammed Dereese	def.	Valdrin Istrefi	TKO (punches)	1	2:06
Bantamweight	Umar Nurmagomedov	def.	Sidemar Honorio	Decision (unanimous) (30-27, 30-27, 30-27)	3	5:00
Preliminary Card (ESPN2)
Heavyweight	Francimar Barroso	def.	Ben Edwards	Decision (unanimous) (30-27, 29-28, 29-28)	3	5:00
Heavyweight	Denis Goltsov	def.	Kelvin Tiller	Submission (ezekiel choke)	2	3:40
Light Heavyweight	Emiliano Sordi	def.	Bazigit Atajev	KO (punches)	1	1:22
Heavyweight	Alex Nicholson	def.	Zeke Tuinei-Wily	TKO (punches)	1	3:07
Light Heavyweight	Jordan Johnson	def.	Sigi Pesaleli	Decision (unanimous) (30-27, 30-27, 30-27)	3	5:00

== Standings After Event ==
The point system consists of outcome based scoring and bonuses for an early win. Under the outcome based scoring system, the winner of a fight receives 3 points and the loser receives 0 points. If the fight ends in a draw, both fighters will receive 1 point. The bonus for winning a fight in the first, second, or third round is 3 points, 2 points, and 1 point respectively. For example, if a fighter wins a fight in the first round, then the fighter will receive 6 total points. If a fighter misses weight, then the fighter that missed weight will receive 0 points and his opponent will receive 3 points due to a walkover victory.

=== Light Heavyweight ===
Fighter	Wins	Draws	Losses	1st	2nd	3rd	Total points
♛ Emiliano Sordi	2	0	0	1	1	0	11
♛ Maxim Grishin	2	0	0	1	0	0	9
♛ Vinny Magalhães	1	0	1	1	0	0	6
♛ Bazigit Atajev	1	0	1	1	0	0	6
♛ Viktor Nemkov	2	0	0	0	0	0	3
♛ Rashid Yusupov	1	0	1	0	0	0	3
♛ Jordan Johnson	1	0	1	0	0	0	3
♛ Sigi Pesaleli	1	0	1	0	0	0	3
E Dan Spohn	1	0	1	0	0	0	3
E Rakim Cleveland	0	0	2	0	0	0	0
E Mikhail Mokhnatkin	0	0	2	0	0	0	0
E Ronny Markes	0	0	2	0	0	0	0

=== Heavyweight ===
Fighter	Wins	Draws	Losses	1st	2nd	3rd	Total points
♛ Denis Goltsov	2	0	0	1	1	0	11
♛ Muhammed Dereese	1	0	1	1	0	0	6
♛ Alex Nicholson	1	0	1	1	0	0	6
♛ Kelvin Tiller	1	0	1	1	0	0	6
♛ Ali Isayev	2	0	0	0	0	0	6
♛ Francimar Barroso	2	0	0	0	0	0	6
♛ Jared Rosholt	1	0	1	0	0	0	3
♛ Satoshi Ishii	1	0	1	0	0	0	3
E Ante Delija	1	0	0	0	0	0	3
E Carl Seumanutafa	0	0	2	0	0	0	0
E Zeke Tuinei-Wily	0	0	2	0	0	0	0
E Valdrin Istrefi	0	0	2	0	0	0	0
E Ben Edwards	0	0	1	0	0	0	0

♛ = Clinched playoff spot --- E = Eliminated

== See also ==
- List of PFL events
- List of current PFL fighters
