= Viktor Nemkov =

Russian sambist, judoka and mixed martial arts fighter

- Born: January 26, 1987 (age 39); Zhalgyskan, Kazakh SSR, Soviet Union
- Native name: Виктор Немков
- Nationality: Russian
- Height: 1.85 m (6 ft 1 in)
- Weight: 205 lb (93 kg; 14.6 st)
- Division: Light Heavyweight
- Style: Sambo
- Fighting out of: Belgorod, Russia
- Team: FedorTeam; Red Devil Sport Club; Lion North-West (BJJ); Fight Spirit Team
- Trainer: Sambo & Judo: Vladimir Voronov; MMA: Fedor Emelianenko; Vitaly Bondarenko
- Rank: International Master of Sport in Sambo; Brown belt in Judo

Mixed martial arts record
- Total: 46
- Wins: 35
- By knockout: 7
- By submission: 14
- By decision: 14
- Losses: 10
- By knockout: 1
- By submission: 3
- By decision: 6
- Draws: 1

Other information
- Notable relatives: Vadim Nemkov (brother)
- Mixed martial arts record from Sherdog

Viktor Nemkov
Medal record

Representing Russia

Men's Sambo

World Championships
| Gold medal – first place | 2022 Bishkek | 98 kg |
| Gold medal – first place | 2011 Vilnius | 100 kg |

Russian Combat Sambo Championships
| Gold medal – first place | 2011 St. Petersburg | 100 kg |

Viktor Alexandrovich Nemkov (Russian: Виктор Александрович Немков; born January 26, 1987) is a Russian sambist, judoka competitor and mixed martial artist. Nemkov won the 2011 World Sambo Championships in Combat Sambo. He is the older brother of Vadim Nemkov.

== Mixed martial arts career ==
=== Background ===
Viktor Nemkov was born in a small village in Zhalgyskan, Kazakh SSR, Soviet Union, now modern-Kazakhstan. In 1999 the family moved to the village Tomarovka, Belgorod Oblast. There, Nemkov began to train in Judo.

Having spent some successful tournaments, Nemkov became a "Master of Sport in Judo."

Nemkov was the 2008 Russian Combat Sambo bronze medalist in the 90 kg weight category and the 2009 World Cup champion.

Nemkov trains at the Red Devil Sport Club; a training facility and team strongly linked with the M-1 Global promotion and Fedor Emelianenko.

=== M-1 Global ===
Nemkov began his professional mixed martial arts career with a loss to Magomed Sultanakhmedov via TKO, but quickly rebounded against newcomer Christian Bombay. Nemkov was able to secure a triangle choke on Bombay early in the first round to claim his first victory.

Nemkov continued in M-1 with several victories, including one in a fight against Sergey Khramov.

Nemkov's toughest challenge at that point came against the vastly experienced Tony Lopez in South Korea. Lopez' experience was perhaps too great, as he walked away with a submission victory via rear naked choke in the second round, handing Nemkov his second career loss.

Nemkov then signed to fight Khanilav Khanilaev at the M-1 2009 Finals. Nemkov went onto suffer his third career defeat, losing via split decision. Nemkov would bounce back with a victory over Shamil Vajsurov who, going into the fight, had a record of 0–1.

In August 2010, Nemkov was reportedly scouted by World Wrestling Entertainment - whilst on a tour of Russia - who wanted to sign him as a professional wrestler.

In April 2011, Nemkov fought Vinny Magalhaes for the vacant M-1 Global Light Heavyweight title. Early on, Magalhaes looked for a takedown, but it was Nemkov who was able to secure top position early on. From there, Nemkov had to defend against multiple submission attempts, including an omoplata which seemed to be almost locked in. From the second round, Magalhaes visibly tired, but still managed to mount Nemkov on a couple of occasions. Magalhaes was able to finish Nemkov in the third round via rare mounted gogoplata with a neck crank.

Following the loss, Nemkov went on a four fight winning streak, including a tournament win held over a 4-month span.

=== Professional Fighters League ===
Nemkov participated in the 2019 season of PFL. During the regular season, Nemkov defeated Rakim Cleveland and Rashid Yusupov via decisions and advanced to playoffs. In the playoffs he faced Bozigit Ataev at PFL 9, which ended in a majority draw leading to Ataev advancing to the semifinals.

=== Bellator MMA ===
On September 1, 2020, it was announced that Nemkov had signed a contract with Bellator MMA.

Nemkov made his Bellator debut at Bellator 257 on April 16, 2021, against Karl Albrektsson. He lost the bout via unanimous decision.

Nemkov faced Leonardo Guimarães on December 19, 2021, at Open Fighting Championship 15. He won via unanimous decision.

Nemkov was scheduled to face José Augusto Azevedo on July 22, 2022, at Bellator 283. However, due to an injury to Nemkov, the bout was scrapped.

== Submission grappling career ==
Nemkov faced Ronny Markes at ADXC 10 on May 31, 2025. He lost the match by decision.

== Championships and accomplishments ==
- M-1 Global
  - M-1 Light Heavyweight Championship (2 Times)

=== Sambo ===
- All-Russian Sambo Federation
  - Russian Combat Sambo National Championships 8nd Place (2010)

== Mixed martial arts record ==
Professional record breakdown
| 46 matches | 35 wins | 10 losses |
| By knockout | 7 | 1 |
| By submission | 14 | 3 |
| By decision | 14 | 6 |
| Draws | 1 | |

| Res. | Record | Opponent | Method | Event | Date | Round | Time | Location | Notes |
|---|---|---|---|---|---|---|---|---|---|
| Loss | 35–10–1 | Khadis Ibragimov | Decision (unanimous) | Sokol 2 | November 28, 2025 | 3 | 5:00 | Moscow, Russia | |
| Win | 35–9–1 | Júnior Albini | TKO (punches) | Sokol 1 | September 26, 2025 | 1 | 4:56 | Krasnodar, Russia | |
| Loss | 34–9–1 | Khadis Ibragimov | Decision (split) | Nashe Delo 86 | December 6, 2024 | 5 | 5:00 | Saint Petersburg, Russia | Lost the Nashe Delo Heavyweight Championship. |
| Win | 34–8–1 | Shamil Gamzatov | Decision (unanimous) | Nashe Delo 84 | June 12, 2024 | 5 | 5:00 | Saint Petersburg, Russia | Defended the Nashe Delo Heavyweight Championship. |
| Win | 33–8–1 | Khusein Adamov | KO (knee) | Nashe Delo 82 | March 6, 2024 | 5 | 1:35 | Saint Petersburg, Russia | Won the Nashe Delo Heavyweight Championship. |
| Win | 32–8–1 | Stepan Gorshechnikov | Submission (rear-naked choke) | Kuzbass MMA Federation: ASI Championship 6 | December 10, 2022 | 1 | 2:31 | Kemerovo, Russia | |
| Win | 31–8–1 | Leonardo Augusto Guimarães | Decision (unanimous) | Open Fighting Championship 15 | December 19, 2021 | 3 | 5:00 | Moscow, Russia | Return to Heavyweight. |
| Loss | 30–8–1 | Karl Albrektsson | Decision (unanimous) | Bellator 257 | April 16, 2021 | 3 | 5:00 | Uncasville, Connecticut, United States | |
| Draw | 30–7–1 | Bozigit Ataev | Draw (majority) | PFL 9 (2019) | October 31, 2019 | 2 | 5:00 | Las Vegas, Nevada, United States | 2019 PFL Light Heavyweight Tournament Quarterfinal. |
| Win | 30–7 | Rashid Yusupov | Decision (split) | PFL 6 (2019) | August 8, 2019 | 3 | 5:00 | Atlantic City, New Jersey, United States | |
| Win | 29–7 | Rakim Cleveland | Decision (unanimous) | PFL 3 (2019) | June 6, 2019 | 3 | 5:00 | Uniondale, New York, United States | |
| Win | 28–7 | Sergio Souza | Submission (choke) | Club Alexander: The Don Battle | November 30, 2018 | 1 | 2:02 | Voronezh, Russia | |
| Loss | 27–7 | Klidson Abreu | Submission (rear-naked choke) | RCC 3 | July 9, 2018 | 2 | 1:02 | Yekaterinburg, Russia | |
| Win | 27–6 | Ronny Markes | Submission (guillotine choke) | M-1 Challenge 77 | May 19, 2017 | 1 | 2:06 | Sochi, Russia | |
| Win | 26–6 | Attila Végh | Decision (unanimous) | M-1 Challenge 71: Nemkov vs. Vegh | October 21, 2016 | 3 | 5:00 | Saint Petersburg, Russia | |
| Loss | 25–6 | Rashid Yusupov | Decision (split) | M-1 Challenge 66 | May 27, 2016 | 5 | 5:00 | Orenburg, Russia | Lost the M-1 Global Light Heavyweight Championship. |
| Win | 25–5 | Stephan Puetz | Decision (majority) | M-1 Challenge 63 | December 4, 2015 | 5 | 5:00 | Saint Petersburg, Russia | Won the M-1 Global Light Heavyweight Championship. |
| Win | 24–5 | Maro Perak | Decision (unanimous) | M-1 Challenge 60: Battle in Orel | August 5, 2015 | 3 | 5:00 | Oryol, Russia | |
| Win | 23–5 | Florian Martin | Submission (rear naked choke) | M-1 Global: Steel Battle 2 | April 24, 2015 | 1 | 1:42 | Stary Oskol, Russia | |
| Win | 22–5 | Beksot Jiyanov | TKO (punches) | M-1 Global: Steel Battle | July 16, 2014 | 1 | 3:03 | Stary Oskol, Russia | |
| Loss | 21–5 | Stephan Puetz | Decision (split) | M-1 Challenge 46 | March 14, 2014 | 5 | 5:00 | St. Petersburg, Russia | Lost the M-1 Global Light Heavyweight Championship. |
| Win | 21–4 | Vasiliy Babich | Submission (armbar) | M-1 Challenge 43 | November 15, 2013 | 2 | 4:06 | Surgut, Russia | Won the vacant M-1 Global Light Heavyweight Championship. |
| Win | 20–4 | Maciej Browarski | Decision (unanimous) | Liberation Cup 2013 | August 5, 2013 | 3 | 5:00 | Belgorod, Russia | |
| Win | 19–4 | Reinaldo da Silva | Submission (achilles lock) | M-1 Challenge 40 | June 8, 2013 | 2 | N/A | Ingushetia, Russia | |
| Win | 18–4 | Gadzhimurad Antigulov | Submission (guillotine choke) | M-1 Challenge 36 | December 8, 2012 | 2 | 1:30 | Mytishchi, Russia | |
| Win | 17–4 | Baga Agaev | Submission (guillotine choke) | S-70: Plotforma Cup 2012 | August 11, 2012 | 1 | 1:12 | Moscow, Russia | Heavyweight bout. |
| Win | 16–4 | Khadzhimurat Kamilov | Submission (armbar) | S-70: Russian Grand Prix 2011 (Stage 4) | May 25, 2012 | 2 | 4:10 | Moscow, Russia | |
| Win | 15–4 | Abdul-Kerim Edilov | Decision (unanimous) | S-70: Russian Grand Prix 2011 (Stage 3) | April 6, 2012 | 3 | 5:00 | Moscow, Russia | |
| Win | 14–4 | Chuck Grigsby | KO (punch) | S-70: Plotforma Cup 2011 | August 5, 2011 | 2 | 3:24 | Sochi, Russia | |
| Loss | 13–4 | Vinny Magalhães | Submission (gogoplata neck crank) | M-1 Challenge 25 | April 28, 2011 | 3 | 1:40 | Saint Petersburg, Russia | For the vacant M-1 Global Light Heavyweight Championship. |
| Win | 13–3 | Vitaly Smirnov | Decision (unanimous) | Voronezh Interregional 2011 | January 15, 2011 | 2 | 5:00 | Voronezh, Russia | |
| Win | 12–3 | Daniel Viscaya | Submission (triangle choke) | M-1 Challenge 22 | December 10, 2010 | 1 | 1:09 | Moscow, Russia | |
| Win | 11–3 | Vasily Klepikov | Submission (arm-triangle choke) | M-1 Mix Fighter: Season 1 - Stage 2 | August 19, 2010 | 2 | N/A | Saint Petersburg, Russia | Won the M-1 Fighter Light Heavyweight Tournament. |
| Win | 10–3 | Artur Korchemny | Submission (arm-triangle choke) | M-1 Mix Fighter: Season 1 - Stage 1 | July 10, 2010 | 1 | 2:55 | Saint Petersburg, Russia | M-1 Fighter Light Heavyweight Tournament Semifinal. |
| Win | 9–3 | Rashid Magomedov | KO (punches) | Lipetsk Mixfight Cup 3 | June 18, 2010 | 2 | 3:24 | Lipetsk, Russia | |
| Win | 8–3 | Shamil Vajsurov | Decision (unanimous) | M-1 Selection 2010: Eastern Europe Round 2 | April 10, 2010 | 2 | 5:00 | Kyiv, Ukraine | |
| Loss | 7–3 | Khanilav Khanilaev | Decision (split) | M-1 Challenge: 2009 Selections 9 | December 3, 2009 | 3 | 5:00 | Saint Petersburg, Russia | |
| Win | 7–2 | Ramazan Rezvanov | Submission (triangle choke) | M-1 Challenge: 2009 Selections 8 | October 4, 2009 | 1 | 3:08 | Kyiv, Ukraine | |
| Win | 6–2 | Rasul Magomedaliev | Submission (triangle choke) | M-1 Challenge: 2009 Selections 6 | September 5, 2009 | 1 | 2:52 | Makhachkala, Russia | |
| Loss | 5–2 | Tony Lopez | Submission (rear-naked choke) | M-1 Challenge 17: Korea | July 4, 2009 | 2 | 3:06 | Seoul, South Korea | |
| Win | 5–1 | Ilya Malyukov | Decision (unanimous) | M-1 Challenge: 2009 Selections 3 | May 28, 2009 | 2 | 5:00 | Saint Petersburg, Russia | Return to Light Heavyweight. |
| Win | 4–1 | Ishkhan Zakharian | TKO (corner stoppage) | M-1 Challenge: 2009 Selections 1 | March 13, 2009 | 2 | 0:34 | Saint Petersburg, Russia | Middleweight debut. |
| Win | 3–1 | Magomed Umarov | Decision (unanimous) | ProFC 3: Heavyweight Grand Prix 2008 | October 4, 2008 | 3 | 5:00 | Rostov-on-Don, Russia | |
| Win | 2–1 | Sergey Khramov | Decision (unanimous) | M-1: Emelianenko Cup 2008 | May 15, 2008 | 3 | 5:00 | Saint Petersburg, Russia | Light Heavyweight debut. |
| Win | 1–1 | Christian Bombay | Technical Submission (triangle choke) | M-1 Challenge 2: Russia | April 3, 2008 | 1 | 1:31 | Saint Petersburg, Russia | |
| Loss | 0–1 | Magomed Sultanakhmedov | TKO (punches) | RZP: Profi Mix Fight 2 | February 22, 2008 | 1 | N/A | Nizhny Novgorod, Russia | Heavyweight debut. |
