= PFL 10 (2018) =

Professional Fighters League MMA event in 2018

- Promotion: Professional Fighters League
- Date: October 20, 2018
- Venue: Entertainment and Sports Arena
- City: Washington, D.C.

Event chronology
PFL 9	PFL 10	PFL 11

The PFL 10 mixed martial arts event for the 2018 season of the Professional Fighters League was held on October 20, 2018, at the St. Elizabeths East Entertainment and Sports Arena in Washington, D.C.

== Background ==
The event was the tenth of the 2018 season and marked the start of the playoffs for the Middleweight and Welterweight divisions.

On October 15, it was announced that second seed welterweight João Zeferino had to pull out of the tournament with a knee injury. He was replaced with Abubakar Nurmagomedov.

== Results ==
Main Card (NBCSN)
Weight class				Method	Round	Time	Notes
Middleweight	Abuspiyan Magomedov	def.	Sadibou Sy	Decision (unanimous) (30-27, 30-27, 29-28)	3	5:00	(Note: Semi-final round bout of the 2018 PFL Middleweight playoffs.)
Welterweight	Ray Cooper III	def.	Handesson Ferreira	TKO (punches)	1	2:28	(Note: Semi-final round bout of the 2018 PFL Welterweight playoffs.)
Middleweight	Louis Taylor	vs.	John Howard	Technical Draw (illegal blow)	2	4:55	(Note: Semi-final round bout of the 2018 PFL Middleweight playoffs.)
Welterweight	Magomed Magomedkerimov	def.	Bojan Veličković	TKO (punches)	2	3:13	(Note: Semi-final round bout of the 2018 PFL Welterweight playoffs.)
Middleweight	Abuspiyan Magomedov	vs.	Gasan Umalatov	Draw (majority) (20-18, 19-19, 19-19)	2	5:00	(Note: Quarter-final round bout of the 2018 PFL Middleweight playoffs.)
Welterweight	Ray Cooper III	def.	Jake Shields	TKO (punches)	1	3:10	(Note: Quarter-final round bout of the 2018 PFL Welterweight playoffs.)
Middleweight	Sadibou Sy	vs.	Bruno Santos	Draw (majority) (20-18, 19-19, 19-19)	2	5:00	(Note: Quarter-final round bout of the 2018 PFL Middleweight playoffs.)
Welterweight	Handesson Ferreira	def.	Rick Story	TKO (verbal submission)	2	1:15	(Note: Quarter-final round bout of the 2018 PFL Welterweight playoffs.)
Preliminary card (Facebook Watch)
Middleweight	John Howard	def.	Eddie Gordon	Decision (unanimous) (20-18, 20-18, 20-18)	2	5:00	(Note: Quarter-final round bout of the 2018 PFL Middleweight playoffs.)
Welterweight	Magomed Magomedkerimov	def.	Pavlo Kusch	Decision (unanimous) (20-18, 20-18, 20-18)	2	5:00	(Note: Quarter-final round bout of the 2018 PFL Welterweight playoffs.)
Middleweight	Louis Taylor	def.	Rex Harris	Decision (unanimous) (20-18, 20-18, 20-18)	2	5:00	(Note: Quarter-final round bout of the 2018 PFL Middleweight playoffs.)
Welterweight	Abubakar Nurmagomedov	vs.	Bojan Veličković	Draw (unanimous) (19-19, 19-19, 19-19)	2	5:00	(Note: Quarter-final round bout of the 2018 PFL Welterweight playoffs.)

== 2018 PFL Middleweight playoffs ==
Quarter-finals
(Germany) Abuspiyan Magomedov (1)	Draw 2
(Russia) Gasan Umalatov (8)	L
(Brazil) Bruno Santos (4)
(Sweden) Sadibou Sy (5)	Draw 2
(Jamaica) Eddie Gordon* (11)	L
(United States) John Howard (6)	UD 2
(United States) Louis Taylor (2)	UD 2
(United States) Rex Harris (7)	L

Semi-finals
(Germany) Abuspiyan Magomedov (1)	UD 3
(Sweden) Sadibou Sy (5)	L
(United States) John Howard (6)	L
(United States) Louis Taylor (2)	Draw 3

Final
(Germany) Abuspiyan Magomedov (1)	L
(United States) Louis Taylor (2)	KO 1

* Shamil Gamzatov was originally scheduled to face John Howard but was forced to pull out of the bout. He was replaced by Eddie Gordon.

Legend
(SD)	(Split Decision)
(UD)	(Unanimous Decision)
(MD)	(Majority Decision)
SUB	Submission
(T)KO	(Technical) Knock Out
L	Loss

== 2018 PFL Welterweight playoffs ==
Quarter-finals
(United States) Ray Cooper III (1)	TKO 1
(United States) Jake Shields (8)	L
(United States) Rick Story (4)	L
(Brazil) Handesson Ferreira (5)	TKO 2
(Russia) Magomed Magomedkerimov (3)	UD 2
(Ukraine) Pavlo Kusch (6)	L
(Russia) Abubakar Nurmagomedov* (9)	Draw 2*
(Serbia) Bojan Veličković (7)	L

Semi-finals
(United States) Ray Cooper III (1)	TKO 1
(Brazil) Handesson Ferreira (5)	L
(Russia) Magomed Magomedkerimov (3)	TKO 2
(Serbia) Bojan Veličković (7)	L

Final
(United States) Ray Cooper III (1)	L
(Russia) Magomed Magomedkerimov (3)	SUB 1

* João Zeferino was originally scheduled to face Bojan Veličković but was forced to pull out of the bout. He was replaced by Abubakar Nurmagomedov.

* Abubakar Nurmagomedov was originally scheduled to face Magomed Magomedkerimov but was unable to continue in the tournament. He was replaced by his quarterfinal opponent, Bojan Veličković.

Legend
(SD)	(Split Decision)
(UD)	(Unanimous Decision)
(MD)	(Majority Decision)
SUB	Submission
(T)KO	(Technical) Knock Out
L	Loss

== See also ==
- List of PFL events
- List of current PFL fighters
