= PFL 6 (2018) =

Professional Fighters League MMA event in 2018

- Promotion: Professional Fighters League
- Date: August 16, 2018
- Venue: Ocean Resort Casino
- City: Atlantic City, New Jersey
- Estimated viewers: 138,000

Event chronology
PFL 5	PFL 6	PFL 7

The PFL 6 mixed martial arts event for the 2018 season of the Professional Fighters League was held on August 16, 2018, at the Ocean Resort Casino in Atlantic City, New Jersey. It was the sixth regular season event of 2018 and included only fights in the welterweight and middleweight divisions.

== Background ==
Paul Bradley was expected to face Rick Story at this event. However, Bradley was removed due to an unspecified reason, and replaced by Carlton Minus.

== Results ==
Main Card (NBCSN)
Weight class				Method	Round	Time	Notes
Welterweight	Ray Cooper III	def.	Pavlo Kusch	TKO (punches)	1	0:18
Welterweight	Magomed Magomedkerimov	def.	Bojan Veličković	Decision (unanimous) (29-28, 29-28, 29-28)	3	5:00
Women's Lightweight	Kayla Harrison	def.	Jozette Cotton	TKO (punches)	3	1:24
Welterweight	Abubakar Nurmagomedov	def.	Jonatan Westin	Decision (unanimous) (30-27, 30-27, 29-28)	3	5:00
Welterweight	João Zeferino	def.	Yuri Villefort	Submission (rear-naked choke)	3	1:10
Preliminary card (Facebook Watch)
Welterweight	Rick Story	def.	Carlton Minus	Submission (rear-naked choke)	2	2:55
Welterweight	Jake Shields	def.	Herman Terrado	Decision (unanimous) (29-28, 29-28, 29-28)	3	5:00
Middleweight	Bruno Santos	def.	John Howard	Decision (unanimous) (30-27, 30-27, 29-28)	3	5:00
Middleweight	Abuspiyan Magomedov	def.	Anderson Gonçalves	TKO (punches)	1	1:27
Middleweight	Shamil Gamzatov	def.	Rex Harris	Decision (unanimous) (30-27, 30-27, 29-28)	3	5:00
Middleweight	Louis Taylor	def.	Andre Lobato	Decision (unanimous) (30-27, 30-27, 30-26)	3	5:00
Middleweight	Gasan Umalatov	def.	Eddie Gordon	Decision (unanimous) (30-27, 30-27, 30-27)	3	5:00

== Standings after event ==
The point system consists of outcome based scoring and bonuses for an early win. Under the outcome based scoring system, the winner of a fight receives 3 points and the loser receives 0 points. If the fight ends in a draw, both fighters will receive 1 point. The bonus for winning a fight in the first, second, or third round is 3 points, 2 points, and 1 point respectively. For example, if a fighter wins a fight in the first round, then the fighter will receive 6 total points. If a fighter misses weight, then the fighter that missed weight will receive 0 points and his opponent will receive 3 points due to a walkover victory.

=== Welterweight ===
Fighter	Wins	Draws	Losses	1st	2nd	3rd	Total Points (Note: The eight fighters with most points (green background) advance to the playoffs)
♛ Ray Cooper III	2	0	0	1	1	0	11
♛ João Zeferino	2	0	0	1	0	1	10
♛ Magomed Magomedkerimov	2	0	0	1	0	0	9
♛ Rick Story	2	0	0	0	1	0	8
♛ Pavlo Kusch	1	0	1	0	1	0	5
♛ Bojan Veličković	1	0	1	0	1	0	5
♛ Jake Shields	1	0	1	0	0	0	3
Abubakar Nurmagomedov	1	0	1	0	0	0	3
Paul Bradley	0	0	1	0	0	0	0
E Yuri Villefort	0	0	2	0	0	0	0
E Jonatan Westin	0	0	2	0	0	0	0
E Herman Terrado	0	0	2	0	0	0	0
E Carlton Minus	0	0	1	0	0	0	0

=== Middleweight ===
Fighter	Wins	Draws	Losses	1st	2nd	3rd	Total Points (Note: The eight fighters with most points (green background) advance to the playoffs)
♛ Abuspiyan Magomedov	2	0	0	2	0	0	12
♛ Louis Taylor	2	0	0	0	0	1	7
♛ Shamil Gamzatov	2	0	0	0	0	0	6
♛ Bruno Santos	2	0	0	0	0	0	6
♛ John Howard	1	0	1	0	1	0	5
♛ Rex Harris	1	0	1	0	0	0	3
♛ { Gasan Umalatov	1	0	1	0	0	0	3
} Sadibou Sy	0	0	1	0	0	0	0
Danillo Villefort	0	0	1	0	0	0	0
E Andre Lobato	0	0	2	0	0	0	0
E Eddie Gordon	0	0	2	0	0	0	0
E Anderson Gonçalves	0	0	2	0	0	0	0

♛ = Clinched playoff spot --- E = Eliminated

== See also ==
- List of PFL events
- List of current PFL fighters
