= John Howard (fighter) =

American mixed martial arts fighter

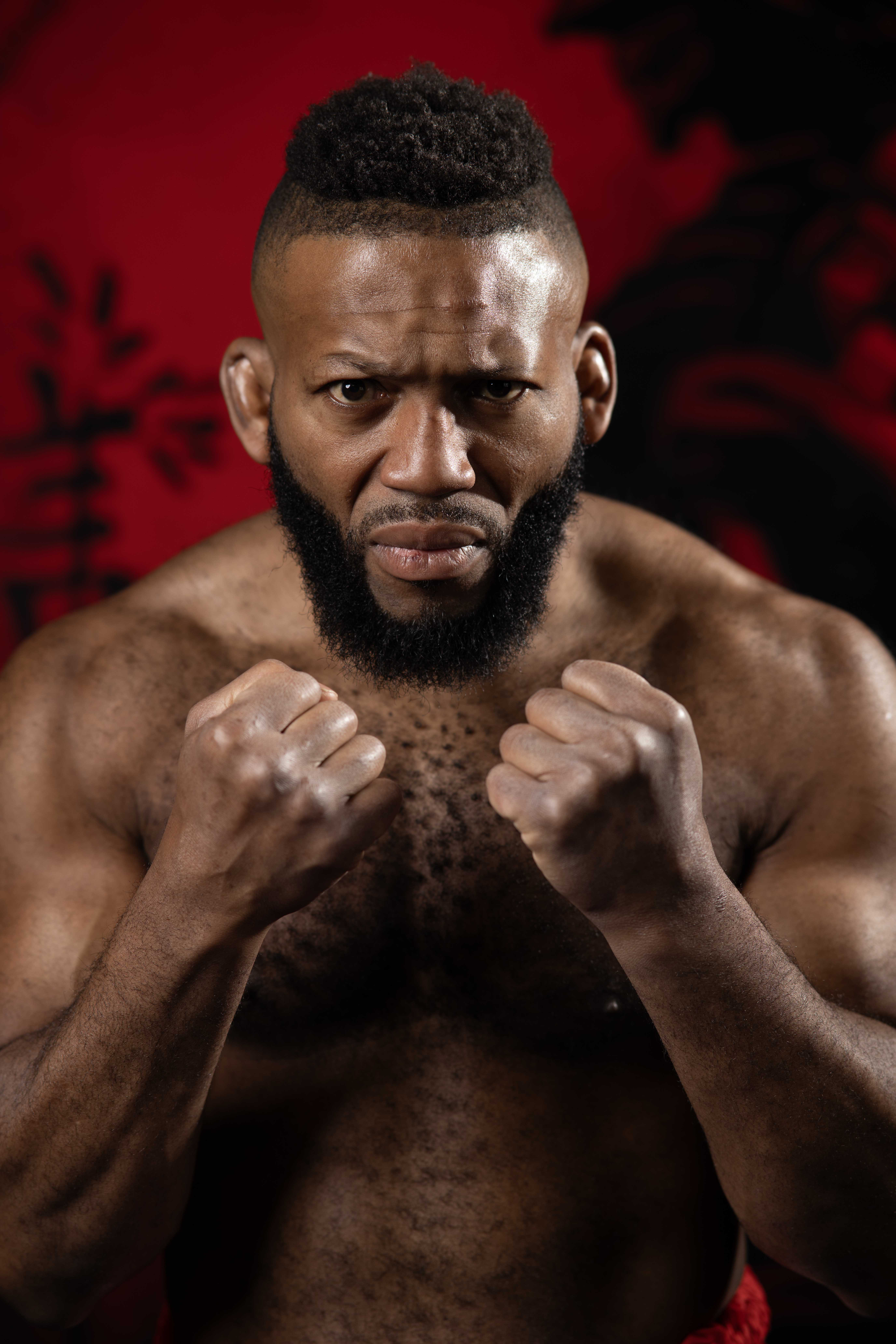
- John "Doomsday" Howard in 2025
- Born: March 1, 1983 (age 43); Boston, Massachusetts, U.S.
- Other names: Doomsday
- Nationality: American
- Height: 5 ft 7 in (1.70 m)
- Weight: 171 lb (78 kg; 12.2 st)
- Division: Welterweight; Middleweight
- Reach: 71 in (180 cm)
- Stance: Orthodox
- Fighting out of: Boston, Massachusetts, United States
- Team: Doomsday Defense Dojo, Ginsberg Academy BJJ
- Rank: Black belt in Brazilian Jiu-Jitsu
- Years active: 2004–present

Mixed martial arts record
- Total: 49
- Wins: 29
- By knockout: 10
- By submission: 7
- By decision: 12
- Losses: 19
- By knockout: 4
- By submission: 2
- By decision: 13
- Draws: 1

Other information
- Mixed martial arts record from Sherdog

John Howard (born March 1, 1983) is an American professional mixed martial artist. A professional competitor since 2004, Howard has formerly competed for the International Fight League, the Ultimate Fighting Championship, CES MMA, the Cage Fury Fighting Championships and Professional Fighters League.

== Background ==
Howard was born and raised by his mother, Laurette, along with his sister in the Dorchester neighborhood of Boston, Massachusetts, where he still resides to this day. Howard got into fights often while growing up. In high school, Howard played football and basketball. He found martial arts after going to a Job Corps to get his high school diploma, where he learned grappling from a freestyle grappler. Later on in his career, he has become well known for his wrestling skills and takedowns in MMA despite not having any background in it. After graduating, Howard began training at a local gym. Howard once sparred against Tamerlan Tsarnaev, a boxer, when the two trained at Wai Kru Mixed Martial Arts in Boston.

=== Nickname: "Doomsday" ===
Howard's nickname, "Doomsday," was given to him by his longtime friend Henry Ainslie during a car ride as they discussed powerful comic book villains and potential fighter aliases. After joking around, the name "Doomsday" — inspired by the infamous character who killed Superman — stuck. In his first official fight, the announcer mistakenly introduced him as "John, The Doomsday," which was later corrected to the now-famous "John 'Doomsday' Howard."

== Training ==
Over the course of his career, Howard has trained with top-tier coaches and teams around the world. His training includes time in Thailand, Brazil, and across the United States. He has been affiliated with several notable gyms:

- Ginsberg Academy Jujitsu – Cambridge, MA
- Waikru MMA – Allston, MA
- Sityodtong Muay Thai / MMA – Somerville, MA
- Team Grudge – Denver, CO

Notable coaches and training partners include:

- John Allen
- David Ginsberg
- Mark Nardone
- Nate Marquardt
- Scott Ream
- Eric Grossman
- Jorge Rivera (retired UFC fighter)
- Alexandre "Alex" Costa (Gracie Barra Boston)

== Legacy and Entrepreneurship ==
On March 1, 2025, Howard opened his own training facility, the Doomsday Defense Dojo in South Easton, Massachusetts. The gym is one of the only known Black-owned mixed martial arts schools in the region. It serves as a community space and training academy for youth, adults, and aspiring professional fighters. In addition to MMA instruction, the gym offers fitness programs and self-defense classes.

Speaking on the launch of his dojo, Howard said, “Opening Doomsday Defense Dojo is a dream come true — not just for me, but for my community. This isn’t just about fighting; it’s about building confidence, protecting yourself, and breaking cycles. I want kids, adults, everyone who walks in that door to feel seen, strong, and ready for life.”

== Advocacy and Representation ==
In 2016, Howard was diagnosed with autism spectrum disorder at age 33. The diagnosis, which followed a series of neurological tests, gave him clarity about many of his life experiences. “Now a lot of stuff in my life makes sense,” Howard said in an interview. “It makes sense why I do certain things. Even to this day.”

Following the diagnosis, Howard has used his platform to advocate for neurodivergent athletes. Through public speaking, media interviews, and inclusive programming at his dojo, he works to break stigma and encourage others to embrace their uniqueness. His gym offers sensory-friendly training and promotes martial arts as a tool for building confidence and communication for individuals on the spectrum.

== Mixed martial arts career ==
=== Ultimate Fighting Championship ===
Howard made his UFC debut on January 31, 2009, against Chris Wilson at UFC 94, winning via split decision.

He then faced Tamdan McCrory at UFC 101. This fight was significant for both as the two had become friends fighting on promotions in the Northeast. Howard won the fight via split decision.

Howard fought Dennis Hallman on December 5, 2009, at The Ultimate Fighter 10 Finale. After getting out-grappled for most of the fight, Howard knocked out Hallman at 4:55 of the third round.

Howard was expected to face Anthony Johnson on March 21, 2010, at UFC Live: Vera vs. Jones, but Johnson sustained an injury during training. UFC newcomer Daniel Roberts stepped in to be Howard's new opponent. Howard defeated Roberts via first-round KO.

Howard was defeated by Jake Ellenberger via third round TKO due to doctor stoppage at UFC Live: Jones vs. Matyushenko. Though Howard had success on the feet, he was unable to defend the takedowns of Ellenberger. Ellenberger would go on to cause Howard's left eye to close after repeatedly landing short elbows and punches from the guard leading to the stoppage.

Howard next faced former title challenger Thiago Alves on December 11, 2010, at UFC 124. He lost the fight via unanimous decision.

Howard was expected to face Martin Kampmann on June 26, 2011, at UFC on Versus 4 However, Kampmann was forced out of the bout with an injury and replaced by Matt Brown. Howard was defeated by Brown after three tough rounds via unanimous decision (29-28, 29–28, 29–28). After the loss to Brown, Howard was released from the promotion.

=== Classic Entertainment and Sports (CES MMA) ===
Howard made his CES debut at CES MMA: Never Surrender against Todd Chattelle for the CES Middleweight Championship. He won via TKO in the second round.

Howard made his first title defense against Scott Rehm. He won via TKO.

Howard's next title defense was against Brett Chism. He won via TKO.

Howard's next title defense was at CES MMA: Path to Destruction, against Jason Louck. He won via KO just 23 seconds into the first round.

Howard defended his title for the fourth time against Chris Woodall. He won via KO in the first round.

=== Return to the UFC ===
Following the Boston Marathon bombing, Howard openly stated that he would like to be on the UFC Fight Night 26 card in Boston, Massachusetts in August 2013 to show support for his hometown. On July 17, 2013, it was announced that he would appear on the card, replacing Josh Samman in a Middleweight bout against Uriah Hall. He defeated Hall via split decision.

Howard returned to Welterweight and faced Siyar Bahadurzada on December 28, 2013, at UFC 168. He won the fight via unanimous decision.

Howard faced Ryan LaFlare at UFC Fight Night 39. He lost the fight by unanimous decision.

Howard was then expected to face Rick Story at UFC Fight Night 45 on July 16, 2014. However, he was forced from the bout due to injury and was replaced by returning veteran Leonardo Mafra.

Howard faced Brian Ebersole on September 27, 2014, at UFC 178. He lost the fight via split decision.

Howard faced Lorenz Larkin on January 18, 2015, at UFC Fight Night 59. He lost the fight via TKO in the first round.

Howard was expected to face Brandon Thatch on July 11, 2015, at UFC 189. However, on June 23, Thatch was pulled from that bout in favor of a fight with Gunnar Nelson as his scheduled opponent John Hathaway was forced out with injury. Howard faced Cathal Pendred at the event. Howard won the fight via split decision.

Howard faced Tim Means on December 10, 2015, at UFC Fight Night 80. He lost the fight via knockout in the second round.

=== World Series of Fighting ===
On March 8, 2016, it was announced that Howard had signed with the World Series of Fighting promotion.

After winning against Michael Arrant at WSOF 31 via unanimous decision, Howard faced Abubakar Nurmagomedov on October 7, 2016, at WSOF33, losing the fight via unanimous decision.

A year later on October 27, 2017, at CES MMA 46: Howard vs. Carroll, Howard faced Roger Carroll, winning the bout by unanimous decision.

=== Professional Fighters League ===
==== 2018 Season ====
In the 2018 season, Howard participated in PFL 3 on July 5, where he faced Gasan Umalatov. Howard won the fight via submission using a rear-naked choke in the second round.

Howard then faced Bruno Santos at PFL 6 on August 16, 2018. He lost the bout via unanimous decision.

Later that year, at the 2018 PFL Middleweight Quarterfinal bout, Howard faced Eddie Gordon and won the fight via unanimous decision.

However, at PFL 10 on October 20, 2018, Howard's bout with Louis Taylor ended in a technical draw due to an illegal knee. Howard was eliminated via a first-round tiebreaker.

==== 2019 Season ====
To start off the 2019 season on May 9, 2019, at PFL 1, Howard faced Magomed Magomedkerimov, losing the bout via guillotine choke at the end of the first round.

On July 11, 2019, at PFL 4, he faced Ray Cooper III, winning the bout after knocking him out in the first round.

However, his next fight against David Michaud at PFL 7 on October 11, 2019, resulted in a loss via unanimous decision.

=== Independent promotions ===
Howard faced Ozzie Alvarez at CES MMA 63: Howard vs Alvarez, winning the bout via unanimous decision.

Howard faced Tyler Ray at XMMA 3 on October 23, 2021. He lost the fight via unanimous decision.

Howard faced Ramazan Kuramagomedov at Eagle FC 44, on January 28, 2022. He lost the bout via unanimous decision.

Howard faced Ange Loosa on April 2, 2022, at XMMA 4. He lost the bout via unanimous decision.

== Bare-knuckle boxing ==
Howard made his Bare Knuckle Fighting Championship debut against Pat Casey on June 14, 2025 at BKFC Fight Night 25. He lost the fight by technical knockout at the end of the first round due to cut.

== Personal life ==
Howard has three daughters. Before fighting professionally, Howard worked as an electrician. He is also a diehard New England Patriots fan, and is a fan of all of the professional teams out of Boston including the Boston Red Sox, the Boston Celtics, and the Boston Bruins. He also enjoys playing video games in his free time.

== Championships and accomplishments ==
=== Mixed martial arts ===
- Ultimate Fighting Championship
  - Fight of the Night (One time)
  - Knockout of the Night (One time)
  - UFC.com Awards
    - 2009: Ranked #7 Newcomer of the Year
- Ring of Combat
  - ROC Welterweight Championship (One time)
- CES MMA
  - CES Middleweight Championship (One time)

== Mixed martial arts record ==
Professional record breakdown
49 matches	29 wins	19 losses
By knockout	10	4
By submission	7	2
By decision	12	13
Draws	1	

Res.	Record	Opponent	Method	Event	Date	Round	Time	Location	Notes
Loss	29–19–1	Ange Loosa	Decision (unanimous)	XMMA 4: Black Magic	April 2, 2022	3	5:00	New Orleans, Louisiana, United States	
Loss	29–18–1	Ramazan Kuramagomedov	Decision (unanimous)	Eagle FC 44	January 28, 2022	3	5:00	Miami, Florida, United States	Super Welterweight bout.
Loss	29–17–1	Tyler Ray	Decision (unanimous)	XMMA 3: Vice City	October 23, 2021	3	5:00	Miami, Florida, United States	
Won	29–16–1	Ozzie Alvarez	Decision (unanimous)	CES MMA 63: Howard vs Alvarez	August 6, 2021	3	5:00	Springfield, Massachusetts, United States	Middleweight bout.
Loss	28–16–1	David Michaud	Decision (unanimous)	PFL 7 (2019)	October 11, 2019	3	5:00	Las Vegas, Nevada, United States	2019 PFL Welterweight Tournament Quarterfinal.
Win	28–15–1	Ray Cooper III	KO (punches)	PFL 4 (2019)	July 11, 2019	1	3:23	Atlantic City, New Jersey, United States	
Loss	27–15–1	Magomed Magomedkerimov	Submission (guillotine choke)	PFL 1 (2019)	May 9, 2019	1	4:54	Uniondale, New York, United States	Return to Welterweight.
Draw	27–14–1	Louis Taylor	Technical Draw (illegal knee)	PFL 10 (2018)	October 20, 2018	2	4:55	Washington, D.C., United States	2018 PFL Middleweight Tournament Semifinal bout. Eliminated via first round tiebreaker.
Win	27–14	Eddie Gordon	Decision (unanimous)	PFL 10 (2018)	October 20, 2018	2	5:00	Washington, D.C., United States	2018 PFL Middleweight Tournament Quarterfinal.
Loss	26–14	Bruno Santos	Decision (unanimous)	PFL 6 (2018)	August 16, 2018	3	5:00	Atlantic City, New Jersey, United States	
Win	26–13	Gasan Umalatov	Submission (rear-naked choke)	PFL 3 (2018)	July 5, 2018	2	2:59	Washington D.C., United States	
Win	25–13	Roger Carroll	Decision (unanimous)	CES MMA 46: Howard vs. Carroll	October 27, 2017	3	5:00	Lincoln, Rhode Island, United States	
Loss	24–13	Abubakar Nurmagomedov	Decision (unanimous)	WSOF 33	October 7, 2016	3	5:00	Kansas City, Missouri, United States	Welterweight bout.
Win	24–12	Michael Arrant	Decision (unanimous)	WSOF 31	June 17, 2016	3	5:00	Mashantucket, Connecticut, United States	Return to Middleweight.
Loss	23–12	Tim Means	KO (punch)	UFC Fight Night: Namajunas vs. VanZant	December 10, 2015	2	0:21	Las Vegas, Nevada, United States	
Win	23–11	Cathal Pendred	Decision (split)	UFC 189	July 11, 2015	3	5:00	Las Vegas, Nevada, United States	
Loss	22–11	Lorenz Larkin	TKO (punches)	UFC Fight Night: McGregor vs. Siver	January 18, 2015	1	2:17	Boston, Massachusetts, United States	
Loss	22–10	Brian Ebersole	Decision (split)	UFC 178	September 27, 2014	3	5:00	Las Vegas, Nevada, United States	
Loss	22–9	Ryan LaFlare	Decision (unanimous)	UFC Fight Night: Nogueira vs. Nelson	April 11, 2014	3	5:00	Abu Dhabi, United Arab Emirates	
Win	22–8	Siyar Bahadurzada	Decision (unanimous)	UFC 168	December 28, 2013	3	5:00	Las Vegas, Nevada, United States	Return to Welterweight.
Win	21–8	Uriah Hall	Decision (split)	UFC Fight Night: Shogun vs. Sonnen	August 17, 2013	3	5:00	Boston, Massachusetts, United States	
Win	20–8	Chris Woodall	TKO (punches)	CES MMA: New Blood	June 7, 2013	1	2:14	Lincoln, Rhode Island, United States	Defended the CES Middleweight Championship.
Win	19–8	Jason Louck	KO (punches)	CES MMA: Path to Destruction	April 12, 2013	1	0:23	Lincoln, Rhode Island, United States	Defended the CES Middleweight Championship.
Loss	18–8	Leandro Batata	Decision (unanimous)	HFR 2: High Fight Rock 2	October 27, 2012	3	5:00	Goiânia, Brazil	
Win	18–7	Brett Chism	TKO (punches)	CES MMA: Real Pain	October 6, 2012	2	3:31	Lincoln, Rhode Island, United States	Defended the CES Middleweight Championship.
Win	17–7	Scott Rehm	TKO (arm injury)	CES MMA: Far Beyond Driven	August 3, 2012	1	1:28	Lincoln, Rhode Island, United States	Defended the CES Middleweight Championship.
Win	16–7	Todd Chattelle	TKO (punches)	CES MMA: Never Surrender	April 13, 2012	2	4:42	Lincoln, Rhode Island, United States	Won the CES Middleweight Championship.
Win	15–7	Dennis Olson	Decision (unanimous)	CFA 3	October 9, 2011	3	5:00	Miami, Florida, United States	
Loss	14–7	Matt Brown	Decision (unanimous)	UFC Live: Kongo vs. Barry	June 26, 2011	3	5:00	Pittsburgh, Pennsylvania, United States	
Loss	14–6	Thiago Alves	Decision (unanimous)	UFC 124	December 11, 2010	3	5:00	Montreal, Quebec, Canada	
Loss	14–5	Jake Ellenberger	TKO (doctor stoppage)	UFC Live: Jones vs. Matyushenko	August 1, 2010	3	2:21	San Diego, California, United States	
Win	14–4	Daniel Roberts	KO (punches)	UFC Live: Vera vs. Jones	March 21, 2010	1	2:01	Broomfield, Colorado, United States	Knockout of the Night.
Win	13–4	Dennis Hallman	KO (punches)	The Ultimate Fighter: Heavyweights Finale	December 5, 2009	3	4:55	Las Vegas, Nevada, United States	
Win	12–4	Tamdan McCrory	Decision (split)	UFC 101	August 8, 2009	3	5:00	Philadelphia, Pennsylvania, United States	
Win	11–4	Chris Wilson	Decision (split)	UFC 94	January 31, 2009	3	5:00	Las Vegas, Nevada, United States	Fight of the Night.
Win	10–4	Charlie Brenneman	Decision (unanimous)	Ring of Combat 21	September 12, 2008	3	5:00	Atlantic City, New Jersey, United States	Won the ROC Welterweight Championship.
Win	9–4	Nick Calandrino	TKO (punches)	IFL: Connecticut	May 16, 2008	3	2:24	Uncasville, Connecticut, United States	Return to Welterweight.
Win	8–4	Jose Rodriguez	KO (punches)	Ring of Combat 18	March 7, 2008	1	4:07	Atlantic City, New Jersey, United States	
Loss	7–4	Dan Miller	Decision (unanimous)	Ring of Combat 17	November 30, 2007	3	5:00	Atlantic City, New Jersey, United States	Middleweight bout.
Loss	7–3	Woody Weatherby	TKO (punches)	WFL 19	September 29, 2007	1	2:32	Revere, Massachusetts, United States	Welterweight debut. For the vacant WFL Welterweight Championship.
Win	7–2	Mandela K'ponou	Submission (armbar)	CZ 23	August 25, 2007	1	N/A	Revere, Massachusetts, United States	
Loss	6–2	Nick Catone	Decision (unanimous)	CFFC 5	June 23, 2007	3	N/A	Atlantic City, New Jersey, United States	
Win	6–1	Josh Rosaaen	Submission (triangle choke)	CFFC 4	April 13, 2007	3	1:17	Atlantic City, New Jersey, United States	
Loss	5–1	Alexandre Moreno	Submission (armbar)	WFL 10	September 23, 2006	1	N/A	Revere, Massachusetts, United States	
Win	5–0	Jason Dublin	Submission (arm-triangle choke)	CZ 15	April 24, 2006	2	2:39	Revere, Massachusetts, United States	Won the vacant CZ Welterweight Championship.
Win	4–0	Aldo Santos	Submission (armbar)	WFL 4	December 3, 2005	1	3:41	Revere, Massachusetts, United States	
Win	3–0	Mandela K'ponou	Submission (heel hook)	WFL 1	February 5, 2005	2	2:52	Revere, Massachusetts, United States	
Win	2–0	Les Richardson	Submission (rear-naked choke)	CZ 9	December 4, 2004	2	2:53	Revere, Massachusetts, United States	
Win	1–0	Jason Dublin	Decision (unanimous)	CZ 8	October 2, 2004	2	5:00	Revere, Massachusetts, United States	

== Bare-knuckle boxing record ==
Professional record breakdown
1 match	0 wins	1 loss
By knockout	0	1
By decision	0	0

Res.	Record	Opponent	Method	Event	Date	Round	Time	Location	Notes
Loss	0–1	Pat Casey	TKO	BKFC Fight Night Mohegan Sun: Porter vs. Cleckler	June 14, 2025	1	2:00	Uncasville, Connecticut, United States	

== See also ==
- List of male mixed martial artists
