= Gamzatov =

Gamzatov is a surname. Notable people with the surname include:

- Rasul Gamzatov (1923–2003), Avar poet
- Shamil Gamzatov (born 1990), Russian mixed martial artist

== See also ==
- 7509 Gamzatov, minor planet
