= Bruno Santos =

Brazilian mixed martial artist

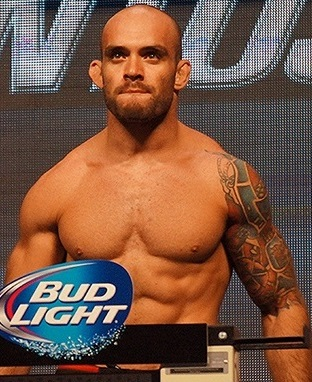
- Born: July 17, 1987 (age 39); Macae, Rio de Janeiro, Brazil
- Other names: Carioca
- Height: 5 ft 8 in (1.73 m)
- Weight: 185 lb (84 kg; 13.2 st)
- Division: Middleweight
- Reach: 69.0 in (175 cm)
- Fighting out of: Miami, Florida, U.S.
- Team: MMA Masters
- Rank: Black belt in Brazilian Jiu-Jitsu
- Years active: 2007–2023

Mixed martial arts record
- Total: 25
- Wins: 19
- By knockout: 1
- By submission: 1
- By decision: 17
- Losses: 5
- By knockout: 2
- By submission: 1
- By decision: 2
- Draws: 1

Other information
- Mixed martial arts record from Sherdog

Bruno Santos (born July 17, 1987) is a Brazilian mixed martial artist who competed in the Middleweight division of the World Series of Fighting and Professional Fighters League.

== Mixed martial arts career ==
=== Early career ===
Santos faced Danilo Pereira on August 29, 2009, at Win Fight & Entertainment 4 for the WFE Middleweight Championship, winning via unanimous decision.

=== Bellator MMA ===
Undefeated at 12–0, Santos made his Bellator debut against Giva Santana at Bellator 61 on March 16, 2012. Though a considerable underdog coming into the fight, Santos would win the fight via unanimous decision, remaining undefeated in the process.

He was then expected to face Brian Rogers on April 20, 2012 at Bellator 66, however Santos was forced out of the bout due to a shoulder injury.

=== Ultimate Fighting Championship ===
Little over a year after his win over Giva Santana, Santos was signed by the UFC and made his debut against fellow newcomer Krzysztof Jotko on December 7, 2013, at UFC Fight Night: Hunt vs. Bigfoot. Santos lost the fight via unanimous decision.

Santos faced Chris Camozzi at UFC 175 on July 5, 2014. He won the fight by split decision.

Santos next faced Elias Theodorou on October 4, 2014 at UFC Fight Night: MacDonald vs. Saffiedine. He lost the fight via unanimous decision and was subsequently released from the promotion.

=== World Series of Fighting ===
On December 31, 2016, Santos made his World Series of Fighting debut at WSOF 34 against undefeated Vagab Vagabov. He won the fight via split decision.

On July 29, 2017 Bruno Santos defeated Rex Harris in a middleweight bout at “PFL: Everett,” the second event for the newly formed Professional Fighters League bringing his professional MMA record to 16-2.

Starting with a victory against Sadibou Sy at PFL 3 on July 5, 2018, in Washington, D.C., the fighter then continued the winning streak with another unanimous decision victory over John Howard at PFL 6 in Atlantic City on August 16 of the same year.

However, a change of fortune occurred during the 2018 PFL Middleweight Quarterfinal bout, where the fighter faced Sadibou Sy again at PFL 10, resulting in a majority draw and elimination via a first-round tiebreaker on October 20, 2018.

The following year was marked by setbacks, with losses to Vyacheslav Babkin by TKO at ACA 97: Goncharov vs. Johnson 2 on August 31, 2019, and Artem Frolov by KO at ACA 104: Goncharov vs. Vakhaev on February 21, 2020, both in Krasnodar, Russia.

A return to form came with a unanimous decision win against Carlos Matos at Titan FC 81 on April 14, 2023, in Santo Domingo, Dominican Republic. Making a quick turnaround, Santos lost to Jared Revel by rear-naked choke technical submission at BFL 77 on June 9, 2023, in Vancouver, Canada, in a significant match for the BFL Middleweight Championship.

== Championships and accomplishments ==
- Win Fight & Entertainment
  - WFE Middleweight Championship (One time)

== Mixed martial arts record ==
Professional record breakdown
25 matches	19 wins	5 losses
By knockout	1	2
By submission	1	1
By decision	17	2
Draws	1	

Res.	Record	Opponent	Method	Event	Date	Round	Time	Location	Notes
Loss	19–5–1	Jared Revel	Technical Submission (rear-naked choke)	BFL 77	June 9, 2023	2	4:42	Vancouver, Canada	For the BFL Middleweight Championship.
Win	19–4–1	Carlos Matos	Decision (unanimous)	Titan FC 81	April 14, 2023	3	5:00	Santo Domingo, Dominican Republic	
Loss	18–4–1	Artem Frolov	KO (punch)	ACA 104: Goncharov vs. Vakhaev	February 21, 2020	2	2:56	Krasnodar, Russia	
Loss	18–3–1	Vyacheslav Babkin	TKO (punches)	ACA 97: Goncharov vs. Johnson 2	August 31, 2019	1	2:33	Krasnodar, Russia	
Draw	18–2–1	Sadibou Sy	Draw (majority)	PFL 10	October 20, 2018	2	5:00	Washington, D.C., United States	2018 PFL Middleweight Quarterfinal bout. Eliminated via first round tiebreaker.
Win	18–2	John Howard	Decision (unanimous)	PFL 6	August 16, 2018	3	5:00	Atlantic City, New Jersey, United States	
Win	17–2	Sadibou Sy	Decision (unanimous)	PFL 3	July 5, 2018	3	5:00	Washington, D.C., United States	
Win	16–2	Rex Harrison	Decision (unanimous)	PFL: Everett (Harrison vs. Rodriquez)	July 29, 2017	3	5:00	Everett, Washington, United States	
Win	15–2	Vagab Vagabov	Decision (split)	WSOF 34	December 31, 2016	3	5:00	New York City, New York, United States	
Loss	14–2	Elias Theodorou	Decision (unanimous)	UFC Fight Night: MacDonald vs. Saffiedine	October 4, 2014	3	5:00	Halifax, Nova Scotia, Canada	
Win	14–1	Chris Camozzi	Decision (split)	UFC 175	July 5, 2014	3	5:00	Las Vegas, Nevada, United States	
Loss	13–1	Krzysztof Jotko	Decision (unanimous)	UFC Fight Night: Hunt vs. Bigfoot	December 7, 2013	3	5:00	Brisbane, Australia	
Win	13–0	Giva Santana	Decision (unanimous)	Bellator 61	March 16, 2012	3	5:00	Bossier City, Louisiana, United States	
Win	12–0	Paulo Henrique Garcia Rodrigues	Decision (unanimous)	WFE 10 - Platinum	September 16, 2011	3	5:00	Salvador, Brazil	
Win	11–0	Julio Cesar dos Santos	Decision (unanimous)	Bitetti Combat 9 - Middleweight Combat Cup	June 18, 2011	3	5:00	Rio de Janeiro, Brazil	
Win	10–0	Vitor Nobrega	Decision (unanimous)	Bitetti Combat 9 - Middleweight Combat Cup	June 18, 2011	2	5:00	Rio de Janeiro, Brazil	
Win	9–0	Angel Orellana	Decision (unanimous)	Bitetti Combat 9 - Middleweight Combat Cup	June 18, 2011	2	5:00	Rio de Janeiro, Brazil	
Win	8–0	Daniel Acácio	Decision (unanimous)	WFE 8 - Platinum	December 15, 2010	5	5:00	Salvador, Brazil	
Win	7–0	Cristiano Lazzarini	Decision (unanimous)	Brasil Fight 2 - Minas Gerais vs. Rio de Janeiro	August 14, 2010	3	5:00	Belo Horizonte, Brazil	
Win	6–0	Michele Verginelli	Decision (unanimous)	WFE - Win Fight and Entertainment 5	November 21, 2009	5	5:00	Salvador, Brazil	
Win	5–0	Danilo Pereira	Decision (unanimous)	WFE - Win Fight and Entertainment 4	August 29, 2009	5	5:00	Salvador, Brazil	Won the WFE Middleweight Championship.
Win	4–0	Eder Jones	Decision (unanimous)	WFE - Win Fight and Entertainment 3	May 16, 2009	3	5:00	Salvador, Brazil	
Win	3–0	Neilson Gomes	TKO (corner stoppage)	WFE - Win Fight and Entertainment 1	September 28, 2008	2	5:00	Salvador, Brazil	
Win	2–0	Edilberto de Oliveira	Decision (unanimous)	Prime - MMA Championship 2	March 8, 2008	3	5:00	Salvador, Brazil	
Win	1–0	Cristiano Nuno	Submission	Prime - MMA Championship	December 1, 2007	2		Salvador, Brazil	
