= Abubakar Nurmagomedov =

Russian mixed martial arts fighter

Abubakar Nurmagomedov Абубакар Нурмагомедов
- Born: November 13, 1989 (age 36); Makhachkala, Dagestan ASSR, Russian SFSR, Soviet Union
- Nationality: Russian
- Height: 5 ft 11 in (180 cm)
- Weight: 170 lb (77 kg; 12 st 2 lb)
- Division: Welterweight
- Reach: 72 in (183 cm)
- Style: Sambo
- Fighting out of: Makhachkala, Dagestan, Russia; San Jose, California, U.S.
- Team: Gadzhi Makhachev freestyle wrestling club American Kickboxing Academy; KHK MMA Team; SC Bazarganova; Eagles MMA
- Rank: International Master of Sports in Combat Sambo
- Years active: 2011–present

Mixed martial arts record
- Total: 22
- Wins: 17
- By knockout: 6
- By submission: 4
- By decision: 7
- Losses: 4
- By knockout: 1
- By submission: 2
- By decision: 1
- Draws: 1

Other information
- Notable relatives: Khabib Nurmagomedov (cousin); Shamil Zavurov (second cousin)
- Mixed martial arts record from Sherdog

Abubakar Magomedovich Nurmagomedov (born November 13, 1989) is a Russian mixed martial artist, who was formerly competing in the Welterweight division of the Ultimate Fighting Championship (UFC). He has also previously competed for the Professional Fighters League (PFL). He is a three-time Combat Sambo World Championship bronze medalist and Russian national combat sambo champion.

== Background ==
Abubakar Nurmagomedov was born on November 13, 1989, in the village of Goksuv in Khasavyurtovsky District, Dagestan. At primary school Abubakar began to train in freestyle wrestling, and after high school he switched to Combat Sambo under Abdulmanap Nurmagomedov. In 2014 he won the bronze medal match at the Combat Sambo World Championships.

== Mixed martial arts career ==
=== Early career ===
Nurmagomedov made his professional MMA debut in October 2011 against Ibrahim Dzhantukhanov of Russia, and won in the first round by Submission (armbar). At the Sochi Star tournament he lost to Magomed Mustafaev by technical knockout in the first round.

=== World Combat Sambo Championship ===
Abubakar came in third place in various world combat sambo tournaments, against multiple world champions like Yaroslav Amosov and Pavel Kusch, and Eldar Eldarov in the tournaments he competed in.

=== World Series of Fighting ===
In March Nurmagomedov signed a contract with WSOF.

In his WSOF debut, Nurmagomedov defeated Jorge Moreno of USA on August 1, 2015, at WSOF 22 via unanimous decision.

After his debut he beat next opponent from Las Vegas, Nevada Danny Davis Jr. on December 18, 2015, at WSOF 26 via unanimous decision.

Nurmagomedov faced Matthew Frincu on April 2, 2016, at WSOF 30. He won the fight via TKO in the second round.

Nurmagomedov faced John Howard on October 7, 2016, at WSOF 33. He won the fight via unanimous decision.

Nurmagomedov faced Matt Secor on 18 March 2017 at WSOF 35. He won the fight via unanimous decision.

=== Professional Fighters League ===
Nurmagomedov competed at PFL welterweight Grand-Prix. He faced Pavel Kusch in the opening round at PFL 3 on July 5, 2018. He lost the fight via rear-naked choke submission in the second round.

Nurmagomedov faced Jonatan Westin on August 16, 2018, at PFL 6. He won the fight by unanimous decision.

On October 15, 2018, it was announced that Nurmagomedov would replace João Zeferino in the Welterweight Tournament at PFL 10 on October 20, 2018. He faced Bojan Veličković in the quarter-final round. The bout ended in a unanimous draw with Nurmagomedov advancing due to winning the first round. However, Nurmagomedov did not advance to semifinals due to hand injury and Veličković replaced him.

=== Ultimate Fighting Championship ===
Nurmagomedov made his promotional debut on November 9, 2019, at UFC Fight Night 163 against David Zawada. He lost the fight via submission in round one.

Nurmagomedov faced Jared Gooden on March 27, 2021, at UFC 260. He won the fight via unanimous decision.

Nurmagomedov was scheduled to face Daniel Rodriguez on July 17, 2021, at UFC on ESPN 26. However, Nurmagomedov was forced to withdraw from the event, citing injury.

Nurmagomedov was scheduled to face Philip Rowe on July 16, 2022, at UFC on ABC: Ortega vs. Rodríguez. However, the pairing was cancelled due to complications on both sides. Rowe has been forced to withdraw due to an injury, while Nurmagomedov is dealing with visa issues.

Nurmagomedov faced Gadzhi Omargadzhiev on October 22, 2022, at UFC 280. He won the bout via unanimous decision.

Nurmagomedov was scheduled to face Carlston Harris on March 11, 2023, at UFC Fight Night 221. However, Nurmagomedov withdrew from the bout due to an undisclosed reasons and was replaced by Jared Gooden.

Nurmagomedov faced Elizeu Zaleski dos Santos on June 3, 2023, at UFC on ESPN 46. He lost the fight via split decision.

On February 14, 2024, it was announced that Nurmagomedov had parted with the UFC.

==== Global Fight League ====
On December 11, 2024, it was announced that Nurmagomedov was signed by Global Fight League.

Nurmagomedov was scheduled to face Louis Glisman on May 25, 2025 at GFL 2. However, all GFL events were cancelled indefinitely.

=== Professional Fighters League ===
After a three-years layoff since UFC release, Nurmagomedov was scheduled to make his PFL debut against David Martinez on November 14, 2026, at PFL Returns to Dubai. However, Nurmagomedov pulled out for unknown reasons and was replaced by Saygid Izagakhmaev.

== Championships and accomplishments ==
=== Sambo ===
- World Combat Sambo Federation (WCSF)
  - 2013 World Championship (Moscow, Russia, 82 kg) — (bronze) ;
  - 2014 Combat Sambo World Cup (Gaspra, Russia, 82 kg) — (bronze) ;
  - 2014 World Championship (Moscow, Russia, 82 kg) — (bronze) ;

== Controversies ==
=== UFC 229 Nurmagomedov-McGregor post-fight incident ===
At UFC 229, Khabib Nurmagomedov jumped the cage after his title victory and charged toward Conor McGregor's cornerman Dillon Danis. Soon after, McGregor and Abubakar attempted to exit the octagon, but a scuffle broke out between them after Abubakar was attacked by McGregor. McGregor was then attacked by two of Khabib's corner men, Zubaira Tukhugov and Esed Emiragaev. On January 29, 2019, the NSAC announced a one-year suspension for Nurmagomedov, (retroactive to October 6, 2018) and a $25,000 fine. He became eligible to compete again on June 6, 2019.

== Mixed martial arts record ==
Professional record breakdown
22 matches	17 wins	4 losses
By knockout	6	1
By submission	4	2
By decision	7	1
Draws	1	

Res.	Record	Opponent	Method	Event	Date	Round	Time	Location	Notes
Loss	17–4–1	Elizeu Zaleski dos Santos	Decision (split)	UFC on ESPN: Kara-France vs. Albazi	June 3, 2023	3	5:00	Las Vegas, Nevada, United States	
Win	17–3–1	Gadzhi Omargadzhiev	Decision (unanimous)	UFC 280	October 22, 2022	3	5:00	Abu Dhabi, United Arab Emirates	
Win	16–3–1	Jared Gooden	Decision (unanimous)	UFC 260	March 27, 2021	3	5:00	Las Vegas, Nevada, United States	
Loss	15–3–1	David Zawada	Submission (triangle choke)	UFC Fight Night: Magomedsharipov vs. Kattar	November 9, 2019	1	2:50	Moscow, Russia	
Draw	15–2–1	Bojan Veličković	Draw (unanimous)	PFL 10	October 20, 2018	2	5:00	Washington, D.C., United States	2018 PFL Welterweight Tournament Quarterfinal. Advanced via first round tiebreaker but later withdrew due to a hand injury.
Win	15–2	Jonatan Westin	Decision (unanimous)	PFL 6	August 16, 2018	3	5:00	Atlantic City, New Jersey, United States	2018 PFL Welterweight Tournament Opening Round.
Loss	14–2	Pavel Kusch	Submission (rear-naked choke)	PFL 3	July 5, 2018	2	1:23	Washington, D.C., United States	2018 PFL Welterweight Tournament Opening Round.
Win	14–1	Matt Secor	Decision (unanimous)	WSOF 35	March 18, 2017	3	5:00	Verona, New York, United States	
Win	13–1	John Howard	Decision (unanimous)	WSOF 33	October 7, 2016	3	5:00	Kansas City, Missouri, United States	
Win	12–1	Matthew Frincu	TKO (punches)	WSOF 30	April 2, 2016	2	3:05	Las Vegas, Nevada, United States	
Win	11–1	Danny Davis Jr.	Decision (unanimous)	WSOF 26	December 18, 2015	3	5:00	Las Vegas, Nevada, United States	
Win	10–1	Jorge Moreno	Decision (unanimous)	WSOF 22	August 1, 2015	3	5:00	Las Vegas, Nevada, United States	
Win	9–1	Vladimir Gunzu	TKO (punches)	Sochi Star Club: Sochi Star Tournament 3	February 22, 2015	1	N/A	Sochi, Russia	
Loss	8–1	Magomed Mustafaev	TKO (doctor stoppage)	Sochi Star Club: Sochi Star Tournament 1	September 1, 2014	2	4:11	Sochi, Russia	
Win	8–0	Richard Totrav	TKO (punches)	Sochi Star Club: Sochi Star Tournament 1	September 1, 2014	1	4:27	Sochi, Russia	
Win	7–0	Dmitry Capmari	TKO (punches)	Union of Veterans of Sport: Champion Cup	December 21, 2013	1	3:36	Novosibirsk, Russia	Return to Welterweight.
Win	6–0	Magomed Shakhbanov	TKO (punches)	Liga Kavkaz: Grand Umakhan Battle	July 7, 2013	1	2:46	Khunzakh, Russia	Middleweight bout.
Win	5–0	Yuri Grigoryan	Submission (kimura)	Russian MMA Union: St. Petersburg MMA Championship 1	March 31, 2013	1	1:40	Saint Petersburg, Russia	Light Heavyweight debut.
Win	4–0	Sergei Akinin	TKO (punches)	OctagonMMA Warriors: Nurmagomedov vs. Akinin	February 21, 2013	1	4:10	Zhukovsky, Russia	
Win	3–0	Adilbek Zhaldoshov	TKO (punches)	OctagonMMA Warriors: Nurmagomedov vs. Akinin	February 21, 2013	1	3:40	Zhukovsky, Russia	Middleweight debut.
Win	2–0	Anatoly Safronov	Submission (triangle choke)	Liga Kavkaz 2012	July 3, 2012	1	2:30	Khasavyurt, Russia	
Win	1–0	Ibrahim Dzhantukhanov	Submission (armbar)	ProFC: Battle in the Caucasus	October 22, 2011	1	1:32	Khasavyurt, Russia	Welterweight debut.

== See also ==
- List of male mixed martial artists
