= Gasan Umalatov =

Russian mixed martial arts fighter

Gasan Umalatov Гасан Умалатов
- Born: November 3, 1982 (age 43); Mekegi, Astrakhan, Russian SFSR, Soviet Union
- Nationality: Russian
- Height: 5 ft 11 in (1.80 m)
- Weight: 181 lb (82 kg; 12.9 st)
- Division: Welterweight (2014–2017); Middleweight (2008–2013, 2018)
- Reach: 71 in (180 cm)
- Fighting out of: Astrakhan, Volga region, Russia; Coconut Creek, Florida, United States
- Team: Fight Nights Team; American Top Team
- Years active: 2008–2018

Mixed martial arts record
- Total: 26
- Wins: 18
- By knockout: 4
- By submission: 7
- By decision: 7
- Losses: 5
- By submission: 1
- By decision: 4
- Draws: 3

Other information
- University: Astrakhan State Technical University
- Notable relatives: Magomed Umalatov (brother)
- Mixed martial arts record from Sherdog

Gasan Umalatov (Russian: Гасан Насрулаевич Умалатов; born November 3, 1982]) is a Russian former mixed martial artist. He competed in the Welterweight division of the Ultimate Fighting Championship.

== Background ==
Gasan Umalatov was born on November 3, 1982, in the village of Mekegi, Levashinsky District, Dagestan, Russia. At the age of one, his family moved to Zenzeli, Astrakhan Oblast. In Russian Navy he trained Boxing, Sambo and Hand-to-hand army fight. Gasan has two degrees; he graduated from both Astrakhan State Technical University and Astrakhan State University. He is a devout Sunni Muslim.

== Mixed martial arts career ==
=== Ultimate Fighting Championship ===
Umalatov made his UFC debut against Neil Magny on February 1, 2014, at UFC 169. Umalatov lost the fight via unanimous decision.

Umalatov faced Paulo Thiago on May 31, 2014, at The Ultimate Fighter Brazil 3 Finale. He won the fight via unanimous decision.

Umalatov faced Cathal Pendred on October 4, 2014, at UFC Fight Night 53. He lost the fight via split decision.

Umalatov was expected to face Sérgio Moraes on April 11, 2015, at UFC Fight Night 64. However, Umalatov pulled out of the bout on March 28 due to an injury. He was replaced by Mickael Lebout.

Umalatov faced Viscardi Andrade on November 7, 2015, at UFC Fight Night 77. He lost the fight by unanimous decision and was subsequently released from the promotion.

== Personal life ==
Umalatov is older brother of mixed martial artist Magomed Umalatov, who is a top contender in PFL organization at Welterweight division.

== Mixed martial arts record ==
Professional record breakdown
26 matches	18 wins	5 losses
By knockout	4	0
By submission	7	1
By decision	7	4
Draws	3	

Res.	Record	Opponent	Method	Event	Date	Round	Time	Location	Notes
Draw	18–5–3	Abusupiyan Magomedov	Draw (majority)	PFL 10 (2018)	October 20, 2018	2	5:00	Washington, D.C., United States	2018 PFL Middleweight Tournament Quarterfinal. Eliminated via first round tiebreaker.
Win	18–5–2	Eddie Gordon	Decision (unanimous)	PFL 6 (2018)	August 16, 2018	3	5:00	Atlantic City, New Jersey, United States	
Loss	17–5–2	John Howard	Submission (rear-naked choke)	PFL 3 (2018)	July 5, 2018	2	2:59	Washington, D.C., United States	
Win	17–4–2	Delson Heleno	TKO (punches)	Fight Nights Global 66	May 21, 2017	1	1:41	Kaspiysk, Russia	
Win	16–4–2	Celso Ricardo da Silva	TKO (punches)	Octagon Fighting Sensation 11	March 4, 2017	1	1:33	Moscow, Russia	Return to Middleweight.
Loss	15–4–2	Viscardi Andrade	Decision (unanimous)	UFC Fight Night: Belfort vs. Henderson 3	November 7, 2015	3	5:00	São Paulo, Brazil	
Loss	16–2–2	Cathal Pendred	Decision (split)	UFC Fight Night: Nelson vs. Story	October 4, 2014	3	5:00	Stockholm, Sweden	
Win	15–2–2	Paulo Thiago	Decision (unanimous)	The Ultimate Fighter Brazil 3 Finale: Miocic vs. Maldonado	May 31, 2014	3	5:00	São Paulo, Brazil	
Loss	14–2–2	Neil Magny	Decision (unanimous)	UFC 169	February 1, 2014	3	5:00	Newark, New Jersey, United States	Welterweight debut.
Win	14–1–2	Gregor Herb	Decision (unanimous)	Fight Nights: Battle of Moscow 12	June 20, 2013	2	5:00	Moscow, Russia	Catchweight (181 lb) bout.
Draw	13–1–2	Aigun Akhmedov	Draw (majority)	Dictator FC 1	June 28, 2012	2	5:00	Moscow, Russia	
Win	13–1–1	Alimjon Shadmanov	Submission (armbar)	CIS Cup 2012	April 6, 2012	2	4:55	Nizhny Novgorod, Russia	Won the 2012 CIS Cup Middleweight Tournament.
Win	12–1–1	Andrei Dryapko	TKO (punches)	CIS Cup 2012	April 6, 2012	2	2:00	Nizhny Novgorod, Russia	2012 CIS Cup Middleweight Tournament Semifinal.
Win	11–1–1	Anatoly Safronov	Submission (triangle choke)	United Glory 15: World Series 2012	March 23, 2012	1	1:53	Moscow, Russia	
Win	10–1–1	Stanislav Molodcov	Submission (triangle choke)	Fight Nights: Battle of Moscow 4	July 7, 2011	2	5:00	Moscow, Russia	
Win	9–1–1	Lukhum Hulelidze	Submission (triangle choke)	ProFC 25: Union Nation Cup 13	February 13, 2011	1	1:00	Kharkiv, Ukraine	
Win	8–1–1	Arsen Magomedov	Submission (heel hook)	International Mixfight 1	January 22, 2011	1	1:10	Cherepovets, Russia	
Win	7–1–1	Asker Unezhev	Submission (rear-naked choke)	ProFC 23: Union Nation Cup 11	December 25, 2010	2	4:35	Saint Petersburg, Russia	
Loss	6–1–1	Alexei Belyaev	Decision (split)	M-1 Selection 2010: Eastern Europe Round 1	February 26, 2010	3	5:00	Saint Petersburg, Russia	
Win	6–0–1	Akhmed Guseinov	Decision (split)	M-1 Challenge: 2009 Selections 7	October 3, 2009	3	5:00	Moscow, Russia	
Win	5–0–1	Akhmed Guseinov	Decision (unanimous)	Global Battle 1	November 14, 2008	2	5:00	Perm, Russia	
Draw	4–0–1	Gennadi Zuev	Draw (unanimous)	Volgograd Fight: Cup Of Russia 2008	November 6, 2008	2	5:00	Volgograd, Russia	2008 Volgograd Fight Middleweight Tournament Final.
Win	4–0	Artur Avakyan	Submission (rear-naked choke)	Volgograd Fight: Cup Of Russia 2008	November 6, 2008	1	3:19	Volgograd, Russia	2008 Volgograd Fight Middleweight Tournament Semifinal.
Win	3–0	Beslan Isaev	KO (punch)	Volgograd Fight: Cup Of Russia 2008	November 6, 2008	1	4:10	Volgograd, Russia	2008 Volgograd Fight Middleweight Tournament Quarterfinal.
Win	2–0	Anatoly Lavrov	Decision (unanimous)	Perm Regional MMA Federation: MMA Professional Cup	April 25, 2008	2	5:00	Perm, Russia	Won the 2008 Perm MMA Middleweight Tournament.
Win	1–0	Sergey Naumov	Submission (rear-naked choke)	Perm Regional MMA Federation: MMA Professional Cup	April 25, 2008	1	0:58	Perm, Russia	Middleweight debut. 2008 Perm MMA Middleweight Tournament Semifinal.

== See also ==
- List of current UFC fighters
- List of male mixed martial artists
