= Bojan Veličković =

Serbian mixed martial arts fighter

- Born: December 18, 1988 (age 37); Novi Sad, SR Serbia, SFR Yugoslavia
- Native name: Бојан Величковић
- Other names: Serbian Steel
- Nationality: Serbian
- Height: 1.82 m (6 ft 0 in)
- Weight: 77 kg (170 lb; 12 st 2 lb)
- Division: Middleweight; Welterweight
- Reach: 192 cm (76 in)
- Stance: Southpaw
- Fighting out of: Denver, Colorado, United States
- Team: American Top Team (2011–2014); Elevation Fight Team (2014–present)
- Rank: Black belt in Brazilian jiu-jitsu
- Years active: 2010–2025

Mixed martial arts record
- Total: 40
- Wins: 25
- By knockout: 8
- By submission: 11
- By decision: 6
- Losses: 13
- By knockout: 3
- By decision: 10
- Draws: 2

Other information
- Mixed martial arts record from Sherdog

Bojan Veličković (Serbian Cyrillic: Бојан Величковић; born December 18, 1988) is a Serbian retired mixed martial artist and sambist. He was competing in the Welterweight division. A professional competitor since 2010, he has competed for the UFC, Professional Fighters League, and RFA, where he was the Welterweight Champion. He competed in Oktagon MMA, where he won the 16-men Oktagon MMA Welterweight Tournament.

== Background ==
Born and raised in Novi Sad, Serbia, Veličković began training in judo at the age of ten, before transitioning to Muay Thai at 14. Then at the age of 22, he began training in Brazilian Jiu-Jitsu and mixed martial arts. In Muay Thai, Veličković holds a record of 14–2.

== Mixed martial arts career ==
=== Early career ===
Veličković was a gold medalist in amateur MMA at the FILA World Wrestling Federation before making his professional debut in 2010 as part of the "Road to the Ring of Fire" reality show. Veličković won all four fights and the show. He then began competing for the Tesla Fighting Championship in his native Serbia, where he was also Welterweight champion.

=== Resurrection Fighting Alliance ===
After compiling a professional record of 9–2, Veličković signed with the promotion in 2014. After losing his promotional debut to former UFC competitor and Ultimate Fighter Season 17 contestant Gilbert Smith, he won his next four fights with the promotion, capturing the Welterweight Championship in his final fight before signing with the UFC.

=== Ultimate Fighting Championship ===
Veličković signed with the UFC after compiling a record of 13–3 first and relocating to Colorado.

Veličković made his promotional debut against Alessio Di Chirico on April 10, 2016, at UFC Fight Night 86. He won the fight via unanimous decision (29–28, 29–28, and 30–27).

Veličković next faced Michael Graves on July 30, 2016, at UFC 201. The bout was declared a majority draw.

Veličković faced Sultan Aliev on December 17, 2016, at UFC on Fox 22. He lost the fight via split decision.

Veličković faced Nico Musoke on May 28, 2017, at UFC Fight Night 109. He won the fight by knockout in the third round. This win also earned Veličković his first Performance of the Night bonus award.

Veličković fought Darren Till on September 2, 2017, at UFC Fight Night: Struve vs. Volkov, losing the bout in a unanimous decision.

Veličković faced Jake Matthews on November 19, 2017, at UFC Fight Night 121. He lost the fight via split decision, and was subsequently released from the promotion.

=== PFL ===
After the release from the UFC, Veličković signed with Professional Fighters League, participating the inaugural season's welterweight bracket. He advanced from the regular season to quarterfinals where he eventually was eliminated, but was brought back to semifinals due to an injury of Abubakar Nurmagomedov. He lost the semifinal bout against Magomed Magomedkerimov via second round knockout.

Veličković also participated in the 2019 season of the Professional Fighters League, ending up losing both of his regular season bouts and not advancing to the playoffs.

=== Post-PFL career ===
Veličković was expected to face Escley Araujo at Serbian Battle Championship 27 on March 14, 2020. However, Araujo withdrew from the bout due to an injury and was replaced by Danillo Santos. Veličković won the fight via second-round submission.

Veličković then challenged Vladislav Kanchev for the SBC Welterweight Championship at Serbian Battle Championship 29 on November 7, 2020. He won the fight via unanimous decision.

==== Oktagon MMA ====
As the first bout of his three-fight contract with Oktagon MMA, Veličković faced Emmanuel Dawa at Oktagon 25 on June 19, 2021. He won the fight via technical knockout after the first round.

In his sophomore appearance he faced Carlo Prater at Oktagon 27 on September 11, 2021. He won the fight via first-round technical knockout.

Veličković faced David Kozma for the Oktagon MMA Welterweight Championship on December 4, 2021, at Oktagon 29. He lost the bout via TKO in the 4th round.

Veličković faced Máté Kertész on March 26, 2022, at Oktagon Prime 5. He won the bout via unanimous decision.

Veličković faced Leandro Silva on October 15, 2022, at Oktagon 36. He lost the bout via split decision.

Veličković faced Ion Surdu on March 4, 2023, at Oktagon 40 in the Oktagon Welterweight Tournament Round of 16, winning bout via the anaconda choke in the first round.

In the Quarterfinals, Veličković faced Christian Jungwirth on June 17, 2023, at Oktagon 44, winning the bout and advancing via unanimous decision.

The semi-finals saw Veličković face David Kozma on September 16, 2023, at Oktagon 46, knocking him out in the first round.

In the finals, Veličković faced Andreas Michailidis on December 29, 2023, submitting him in the third round via rear-naked choke to win the 300 thousand euro prize for winning the tournament.

Veličković faced Ronald Paradeiser on June 14, 2025, at Oktagon 72. He lost the bout by TKO in the first round after injuring his leg. After the fight, Veličković announced his retirement from MMA.

== Championships and accomplishments ==
- Oktagon MMA
  - 2023 Oktagon Welterweight Tournament
- Resurrection Fighting Alliance
  - Welterweight Champion
- Tesla Fighting Championship
  - Middleweight Champion
- Ultimate Fighting Championship
  - Performance of the Night (One time) vs. Nico Musoke
- Serbian Battle Championship
  - SBC Welterweight Championship (one time; current)

== Mixed martial arts record ==
Professional record breakdown
40 matches	25 wins	13 losses
By knockout	8	3
By submission	11	0
By decision	6	10
Draws	2	

Res.	Record	Opponent	Method	Event	Date	Round	Time	Location	Notes
Loss	25–13–2	Ronald Paradeiser	TKO (leg injury)	Oktagon 72	June 14, 2025	1	1:31	Prague, Czech Republic	
Win	25–12–2	Andreas Michailidis	Submission (rear-naked choke)	Oktagon 51	December 29, 2023	3	3:21	Prague, Czech Republic	Won the Oktagon Welterweight Tournament.
Win	24–12–2	David Kozma	KO (punches)	Oktagon 46	September 16, 2023	1	3:45	Frankfurt, Germany	Oktagon Welterweight Tournament Semifinal. Performance of the Night.
Win	23–12–2	Christian Jungwirth	Decision (unanimous)	Oktagon 44	June 17, 2023	3	5:00	Oberhausen, Germany	Oktagon Welterweight Tournament Quarterfinal.
Win	22–12–2	Ion Surdu	Submission (anaconda choke)	Oktagon 40	March 4, 2023	1	2:55	Ostrava, Czech Republic	Oktagon Welterweight Tournament Round of 16. Performance of the Night.
Loss	21–12–2	Leandro Silva	Decision (split)	Oktagon 36	October 15, 2022	3	5:00	Frankfurt, Germany	
Win	21–11–2	Máté Kertész	Decision (unanimous)	Oktagon Prime 5	March 26, 2022	3	5:00	Samorin, Slovakia	
Loss	20–11–2	David Kozma	TKO (punches)	Oktagon 29	December 4, 2021	4	3:16	Ostrava, Czech Republic	For the Oktagon Welterweight Championship.
Win	20–10–2	Carlo Prater	TKO (punches)	Oktagon 27	September 11, 2021	1	2:44	Bratislava, Slovakia	
Win	19–10–2	Emmanuel Dawa	TKO (doctor stoppage)	Oktagon 25	June 19, 2021	1	5:00	Brno, Czech Republic	
Win	18–10–2	Vladislav Kanchev	Decision (unanimous)	Serbian Battle Championship 29	October 7, 2020	3	5:00	Novi Sad, Serbia	Won the SBC Welterweight Championship.
Win	17–10–2	Danillo Santos	Submission (guillotine choke)	Serbian Battle Championship 27	March 14, 2020	2	0:59	Vrbas, Serbia	
Loss	16–10–2	João Zeferino	Decision (unanimous)	PFL 4 (2019)	July 11, 2019	3	5:00	Atlantic City, New Jersey, United States	
Loss	16–9–2	Handesson Ferreira	Decision (unanimous)	PFL 1 (2019)	May 9, 2019	3	5:00	Uniondale, New York, United States	
Loss	16–8–2	Magomed Magomedkerimov	TKO (punches)	PFL 10 (2018)	October 20, 2018	2	3:13	Washington, D.C., United States	2018 PFL Welterweight Tournament Semifinal.
Draw	16–7–2	Abubakar Nurmagomedov	Draw (unanimous)	PFL 10 (2018)	October 20, 2018	2	5:00	Washington, D.C., United States	2018 PFL Welterweight Tournament Quarterfinal. Eliminated via first round tiebreaker.
Loss	16–7–1	Magomed Magomedkerimov	Decision (unanimous)	PFL 6 (2018)	August 16, 2018	3	5:00	Atlantic City, New Jersey, United States	
Win	16–6–1	Jonatan Westin	TKO (punches)	PFL 3 (2018)	July 5, 2018	2	2:50	Washington, D.C., United States	
Loss	15–6–1	Jake Matthews	Decision (split)	UFC Fight Night: Werdum vs. Tybura	November 19, 2017	3	5:00	Sydney, Australia	
Loss	15–5–1	Darren Till	Decision (unanimous)	UFC Fight Night: Volkov vs. Struve	September 2, 2017	3	5:00	Rotterdam, Netherlands	
Win	15–4–1	Nico Musoke	KO (punches)	UFC Fight Night: Gustafsson vs. Teixeira	May 28, 2017	3	4:37	Stockholm, Sweden	Performance of the Night.
Loss	14–4–1	Sultan Aliev	Decision (split)	UFC on Fox: VanZant vs. Waterson	December 17, 2016	3	5:00	Sacramento, California, United States	
Draw	14–3–1	Michael Graves	Draw (majority)	UFC 201	July 30, 2016	3	5:00	Atlanta, Georgia, United States	
Win	14–3	Alessio Di Chirico	Decision (unanimous)	UFC Fight Night: Rothwell vs. dos Santos	April 10, 2016	3	5:00	Zagreb, Croatia	Middleweight bout.
Win	13–3	Benjamin Smith	Submission (guillotine choke)	RFA 34	January 15, 2016	3	1:51	Broomfield, Colorado, United States	Won the vacant RFA Welterweight Championship.
Win	12–3	Vardan Sholinian	Decision (unanimous)	RFA 31	October 9, 2015	3	5:00	Las Vegas, Nevada, United States	Catchweight (175 lb) bout.
Win	11–3	Charles Byrd	Decision (unanimous)	RFA vs. Legacy FC 1	May 8, 2015	3	5:00	Robinsonville, Mississippi, United States	
Win	10–3	Chris Hugh	TKO (punches)	RFA 24	March 6, 2015	1	4:40	Prior Lake, Minnesota, United States	
Loss	9–3	Gilbert Smith	Decision (majority)	RFA 20	November 7, 2014	3	5:00	Broomfield, Colorado, United States	Welterweight debut.
Win	9–2	Nikolay Aleksakhin	Submission (guillotine choke)	Tesla FC 4	June 14, 2014	2	2:35	Pančevo, Serbia	Won the Tesla FC Middleweight Championship.
Loss	8–2	Krzysztof Jotko	Decision (majority)	MMA Attack 3	April 27, 2013	3	5:00	Katowice, Poland	Fight of the Night.
Win	8–1	Tomáš Kužela	Submission (rear-naked choke)	Heroes Gate 9	December 28, 2012	2	N/A	Prague, Czech Republic	
Win	7–1	Jiří Procházka	TKO (punches)	Supreme FC 1	December 9, 2012	1	N/A	Belgrade, Serbia	Catchweight (200 lb) bout.
Loss	6–1	Svetlozar Savov	Decision (split)	World Freefight Challenge 17	October 21, 2012	3	5:00	Ljubljana, Slovenia	For the WFC Middleweight Championship.
Win	6–0	Marko Lukačić	Submission (rear-naked choke)	Tesla FC 2	December 24, 2011	1	N/A	Belgrade, Serbia	
Win	5–0	Jason Lee	KO (punches)	Ring of Fire 41	August 20, 2011	1	1:39	Broomfield, Colorado, United States	
Win	4–0	Nemanja Uverić	Submission (guillotine choke)	Tesla FC 1	June 19, 2011	2	N/A	Belgrade, Serbia	
Win	3–0	Svetislav Nikolajev	Submission (armbar)	Tesla FC 1	June 19, 2011	2	N/A	Belgrade, Serbia	
Win	2–0	Marko Ignjatović	Submission (heel hook)	Ring of Fire Europe 2/3	August 28, 2010	1	2:57	Subotica, Serbia	
Win	1–0	Vladimir Jovanović	Submission (armbar)	Ring of Fire Europe 2/3	August 28, 2010	1	3:59	Subotica, Serbia	Middleweight debut.
