= UFC Fight Night: Yan vs. Dvalishvili =

Mixed martial arts event in 2023

- The poster for UFC Fight Night: Yan vs. Dvalishvili
- Promotion: Ultimate Fighting Championship
- Date: March 11, 2023
- Venue: The Theater at Virgin Hotels
- City: Paradise, Nevada, United States
- Attendance: 2,361
- Total gate: $452,669.71

Event chronology
UFC 285: Jones vs. Gane	UFC Fight Night: Yan vs. Dvalishvili	UFC 286: Edwards vs. Usman 3

UFC Fight Night: Yan vs. Dvalishvili (also known as UFC Fight Night 221, UFC on ESPN+ 79) was a mixed martial arts event produced by the Ultimate Fighting Championship that took place on March 11, 2023, at The Theater at Virgin Hotels in Paradise, Nevada part of the Las Vegas Metropolitan Area, United States.

== Background ==
The venue was originally known as The Joint (part of the Hard Rock Hotel and Casino) and held several UFC and WEC events in the early 2000s. This event marked the promotion's first visit to the venue after it was rebranded and the first since The Ultimate Fighter: Team Carwin vs. Team Nelson Finale in December 2012.

A light heavyweight bout between former UFC Light Heavyweight Championship challenger Anthony Smith and Jamahal Hill was expected to headline the event. However, in mid-December, Hill was pulled from the contest in order to headline UFC 283 against former champion Glover Teixeira for the vacant title. Smith was later scheduled to face Johnny Walker on May 13 at UFC on ABC: Rozenstruik vs. Almeida.

A bantamweight bout between former UFC Bantamweight Champion Petr Yan and Merab Dvalishvili headlined the event.

A bantamweight bout between Mario Bautista and Guido Cannetti took place at the event. They were previously scheduled to meet at UFC on ESPN: Barboza vs. Chikadze, but Bautista pulled out after testing positive for COVID-19.

A middleweight bout between Makhmud Muradov and Abusupiyan Magomedov was expected to take place at the event. They were previously scheduled to meet at UFC Fight Night: Gane vs. Tuivasa but Muradov withdrew due to injury. At the end of February, it was announced that Muradov had pulled out of the bout again.

A bantamweight bout between Raphael Assunção and Kyler Phillips was scheduled for the event. However, Phillips withdrew from the event for undisclosed reasons and was replaced by Davey Grant.

A light heavyweight bout between Nikita Krylov and former LFA Light Heavyweight Champion Ryan Spann was originally expected to headline UFC Fight Night: Muniz vs. Allen. However, the headliner was cancelled during the broadcast as Krylov had fallen ill. The pair was rescheduled for this event at a catchweight of 215 pounds.

A welterweight bout between Carlston Harris and Abubakar Nurmagomedov was expected to take place at the event. However, Nurmagomedov withdrew from the bout due to undisclosed reasons and was replaced by Jared Gooden. At the weigh-ins, Gooden weighed in at 177 pounds, six pounds over the welterweight non-title fight limit. The bout proceeded at catchweight and Gooden was fined 30% of his purse, which went to Harris.

Also at the weigh-ins, Ricardo Ramos weighed in at 154 pounds, eight pounds over the featherweight non-title fight limit. As a result, his bout with Austin Lingo was cancelled.

== Results ==
Main card (ESPN+)
Weight class				Method	Round	Time	Notes
Bantamweight	Merab Dvalishvili	def.	Petr Yan	Decision (unanimous) (50–45, 50–45, 50–45)	5	5:00
Heavyweight	Alexander Volkov	def.	Alexander Romanov	TKO (punches)	1	2:16
Catchweight (215 lb)	Nikita Krylov	def.	Ryan Spann	Submission (triangle choke)	1	3:38
Bantamweight	Jonathan Martinez	def.	Said Nurmagomedov	Decision (unanimous) (29–28, 29–28, 29–28)	3	5:00
Bantamweight	Mario Bautista	def.	Guido Cannetti	Submission (rear-naked choke)	1	3:18
Light Heavyweight	Vitor Petrino	def.	Anton Turkalj	Decision (unanimous) (30–26, 30–27, 30–27)	3	5:00
Preliminary card (ESPN+)
Heavyweight	Karl Williams	def.	Łukasz Brzeski	Decision (unanimous) (30–26, 30–26, 30–27)	3	5:00
Bantamweight	Davey Grant	def.	Raphael Assunção	Technical Submission (inverted triangle choke)	3	4:43	(Note: Grant was deducted 1 point in round 3 due to a fence grab.)
Middleweight	Josh Fremd	def.	Sedriques Dumas	Submission (guillotine choke)	2	3:00
Bantamweight	Victor Henry	def.	Tony Gravely	Decision (split) (30–27, 28–29, 29–28)	3	5:00
Women's Flyweight	Ariane Lipski	def.	JJ Aldrich	Decision (unanimous) (30–27, 30–27, 30–27)	3	5:00
Flyweight	Bruno Gustavo da Silva	def.	Tyson Nam	Technical Submission (rear-naked choke)	2	1:23
Catchweight (177 lb)	Carlston Harris	def.	Jared Gooden	Decision (unanimous) (30–27, 30–27, 30–27)	3	5:00

== Bonus awards ==
The following fighters received $50,000 bonuses.

- Fight of the Night: Vitor Petrino vs. Anton Turkalj
- Performance of the Night: Davey Grant and Bruno Gustavo da Silva

== Aftermath ==
This event holds the record for most takedowns landed in UFC history with 59.

== See also ==
- List of UFC events
- List of current UFC fighters
- 2023 in UFC
