= PFL 3 (2018) =

Professional Fighters League MMA event in 2018

- Promotion: Professional Fighters League
- Date: July 5, 2018
- Venue: Charles E. Smith Center
- City: Washington, D.C.
- Estimated viewers: 46,000

Event chronology
PFL 2	PFL 3	PFL 4

The PFL 3 mixed martial arts event for the 2018 season of the Professional Fighters League was held on July 5, 2018, at the Charles E. Smith Center in Washington, D.C. It was the third regular season event of 2018 and included only fights in the welterweight and middleweight divisions.

== Results ==
Main Card (NBCSN)
Weight class				Method	Round	Time	Notes
Welterweight	Ray Cooper III	def.	Jake Shields	TKO (punches)	2	2:09
Welterweight	Pavlo Kusch	def.	Abubakar Nurmagomedov	Submission (rear-naked choke)	2	1:23
Welterweight	Rick Story	def.	Yuri Villefort	Decision (unanimous) (30-27, 30-27, 30-27)	3	5:00
Middleweight	Shamil Gamzatov	def.	Eddie Gordon	Decision (unanimous) (30-27, 29-28, 29-28)	3	5:00
Middleweight	John Howard	def.	Gasan Umalatov	Submission (rear-naked choke)	2	2:59
Preliminary card (Facebook Watch)
Welterweight	Magomed Magomedkerimov	def.	Herman Terrado	Submission (rear-naked choke)	1	4:54
Welterweight	João Zeferino	def.	Paul Bradley	TKO (punches)	1	1:58
Middleweight	Bruno Santos	def.	Sadibou Sy	Decision (unanimous) (29-28, 29-28, 29-28)	3	5:00
Middleweight	Louis Taylor	def.	Anderson Gonçalves	TKO (punches)	3	0:58
Middleweight	Rex Harris	def.	Andre Lobato	Decision (split) (29-28, 28-29, 29-28)	3	5:00
Middleweight	Abuspiyan Magomedov	def.	Danillo Villefort	TKO (body kick and punches)	1	3:37
Welterweight	Bojan Veličković	def.	Jonatan Westin	TKO (punches)	2	2:50

== Standings after event ==
The point system consists of outcome based scoring and bonuses for an early win. Under the outcome based scoring system, the winner of a fight receives 3 points and the loser receives 0 points. If the fight ends in a draw, both fighters will receive 1 point. The bonus for winning a fight in the first, second, or third round is 3 points, 2 points, and 1 point respectively. For example, if a fighter wins a fight in the first round, then the fighter will receive 6 total points. If a fighter misses weight, then the fighter that missed weight will receive 0 points and his opponent will receive 3 points due to a walkover victory.

=== Welterweight ===
Fighter	Wins	Draws	Losses	1st	2nd	3rd	Total Points (Note: The eight fighters with most points (green background) advance to the playoffs)
JoãoZeferino	1	0	0	1	0	0	6
Magomed Magomedkerimov	1	0	0	1	0	0	6
Pavlo Kusch	1	0	0	0	1	0	5
Ray Cooper III	1	0	0	0	1	0	5
Bojan Veličković	1	0	0	0	1	0	5
Rick Story	1	0	0	0	0	0	3
Yuri Villefort	0	0	1	0	0	0	0
Jonatan Westin	0	0	1	0	0	0	0
Jake Shields	0	0	1	0	0	0	0
Abubakar Nurmagomedov	0	0	1	0	0	0	0
Herman Terrado	0	0	1	0	0	0	0
Paul Bradley	0	0	1	0	0	0	0

=== Middleweight ===
Fighter	Wins	Draws	Losses	1st	2nd	3rd	Total Points (Note: The eight fighters with most points (green background) advance to the playoffs)
Abuspiyan Magomedov	1	0	0	1	0	0	6
John Howard	1	0	0	0	1	0	5
Louis Taylor	1	0	0	0	0	1	4
Shamil Gamzatov	1	0	0	0	0	0	3
Bruno Santos	1	0	0	0	0	0	3
Rex Harris	1	0	0	0	0	0	3
Andre Lobato	0	0	1	0	0	0	0
Sadibou Sy	0	0	1	0	0	0	0
Eddie Gordon	0	0	1	0	0	0	0
Anderson Gonçalves	0	0	1	0	0	0	0
Gasan Umalatov	0	0	1	0	0	0	0
Danillo Villefort	0	0	1	0	0	0	0

== See also ==
- List of PFL events
- List of current PFL fighters
