= Herman Terrado =

American mixed martial artist from Guam

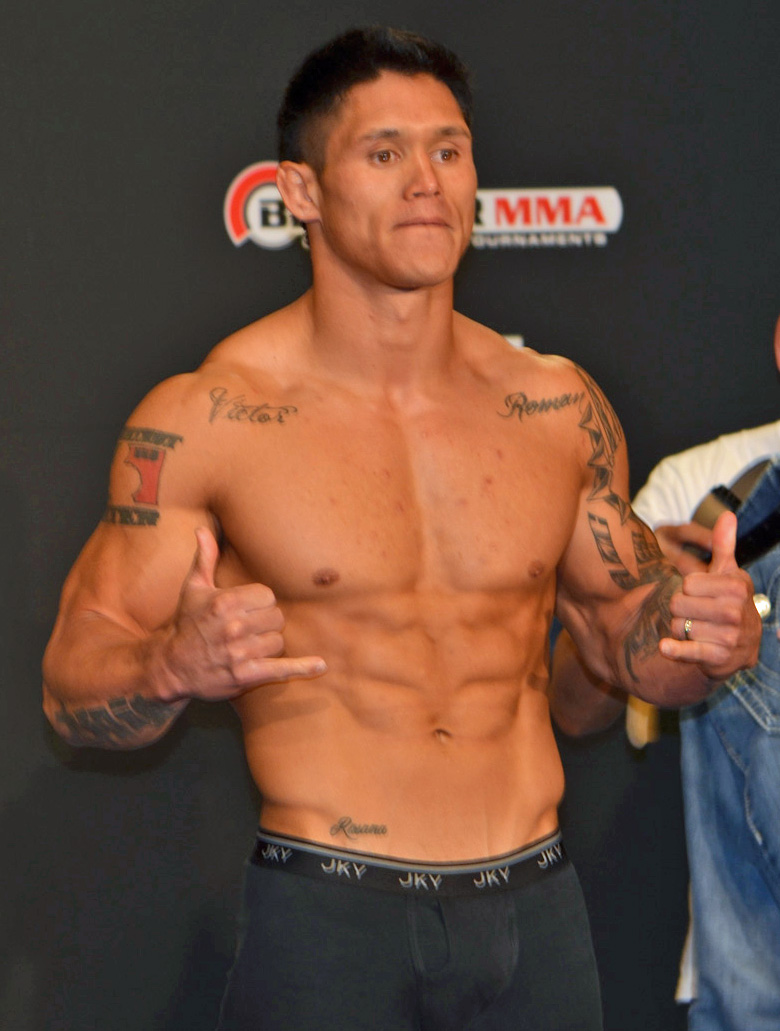
- Terrado in 2014
- Born: September 27, 1989 (age 37); Barrigada, Guam
- Other names: The Titan
- Height: 5 ft 9 in (1.75 m)
- Weight: 179 lb (81 kg; 12.8 st)
- Division: Welterweight
- Reach: 69 in (175 cm)
- Fighting out of: San Diego, California, United States
- Team: Gamebred
- Years active: 2008–present

Mixed martial arts record
- Total: 23
- Wins: 15
- By knockout: 8
- By submission: 6
- By decision: 1
- Losses: 7
- By knockout: 1
- By submission: 2
- By decision: 4
- Draws: 1

Other information
- Mixed martial arts record from Sherdog

Herman Terrado (born September 27, 1989) is a professional mixed martial artist from Guam currently competing in the Welterweight division. A professional competitor since 2008, Terrado has also formerly competed for Strikeforce and the Professional Fighters League.

== Background ==
Born and raised on the island of Guam, Terrado began bodybuilding at the age of 11 and was talented, going on to win several competitions. In high school, Terrado competed in wrestling and also excelled, winning gold medals for his junior and senior seasons. It was after graduating high school that Terrado began training in MMA.

== Mixed martial arts career ==
=== Early career ===
Terrado made his professional MMA debut on March 8, 2008, when he faced Bobby Green at COF 11: No Mercy. He lost the fight via guillotine choke submission. Terrado fought in many promotions throughout the United States, most notably Gladiator Challenge, where he held a record of 3–0.

Terrado would compile a professional MMA record of 7–2 on the regional circuit before signing with now-defunct promotion Strikeforce in early 2008.

=== Strikeforce ===
Terrado made his debut against A.J. Matthews on April 9, 2011, at Strikeforce: Diaz vs. Daley. He won via TKO (punches) in the first round.

Terrado faced Chris Brown on December 17, 2011, at Strikeforce: Melendez vs. Masvidal. He won via submission due to an armbar in the third round.

=== Bellator MMA ===
Terrado was expected to face Mark Scanlon on September 20, 2013, at Bellator 100 in the quarterfinal match of Bellator Season Nine Welterweight Tournament. However, Scanlon was replaced by Rick Hawn due to injury. Terrado lost via unanimous decision (30-27, 29–28, 29–28).

Terrado then faced Justin Baesman at Bellator 115 on April 4, 2014. After three back-and-forth rounds, the fight was ruled a majority draw. Following the event, Terrado tested positive for Drostanolone Metabolites. Terrado was given a nine-month suspension by The Nevada State Athletic Commission and fined $1,000.

=== Professional Fighters League ===
After going 3–0 on the California regional scene, in June 2017, Terrado debuted for the Professional Fighters League, the recently renamed World Series of Fighting. He faced João Zeferino at Professional Fighters League 36: Fitch vs. Foster and won the back-and-forth fight by split decision.

Terrado faced Magomed Magomedkerimov at PFL 3, getting chocked out at the end of the first round via rear-naked choke.

On August 16, 2018, Terrado faced Jake Shields at PFL 6, losing via unanimous decision advancing to the playoffs.

=== Bellator MMA ===
Terrado was expected to face Mukhamed Berkhamov on April 2, 2021, at Bellator 255. Berkhamov missed weight by 2.8 pounds, leading to the bout being pulled from the lineup due to Berkhamov's miss.

After more than two years, Terrado was rebooked with Berkhamov on October 7, 2023, at Bellator 300. He lost the fight via unanimous decision.

Terrado faced Masayuki Kikuiri on September 7, 2024 at Bellator Champions Series 4, losing the fight via body kick TKO in the third round.

== Professional grappling career ==
Terrado competed against Christian Aguilera at Subversiv 10 for the promotion's 185lbs Combat Jiu-Jitsu title on April 13, 2024. He won the match by submission in EBI overtime.

== Mixed martial arts record ==
Professional record breakdown
23 matches	15 wins	7 losses
By knockout	8	1
By submission	6	2
By decision	1	4
Draws	1	

Res.	Record	Opponent	Method	Event	Date	Round	Time	Location	Notes
Loss	15–7–1	Masayuki Kikuiri	TKO (body kick and punches)	Bellator Champions Series 4	September 7, 2024	3	2:54	San Diego, California, United States	
Loss	15–6–1	Mukhamed Berkhamov	Decision (unanimous)	Bellator 300	October 7, 2023	3	5:00	San Diego, California, United States	Catchweight (180 lb) bout.
Loss	15–5–1	Jake Shields	Decision (unanimous)	PFL 6 (2018)	August 16, 2018	3	5:00	Atlantic City, New Jersey, United States	
Loss	15–4–1	Magomed Magomedkerimov	Technical Submission (rear-naked choke)	PFL 3 (2018)	July 5, 2018	1	4:54	Washington, D.C., United States	
Win	15–3–1	João Zeferino	Decision (split)	PFL Daytona	June 30, 2017	3	5:00	Daytona Beach, Florida, United States	
Win	14–3–1	Roman Bellow	Submission (guillotine choke)	Gladiator Challenge: MMA Smackdown	April 2, 2016	1	1:26	El Cajon, California, United States	
Win	13–3–1	CJ Bains	TKO (punches)	Gladiator Challenge: Contenders	July 11, 2015	1	0:07	El Cajon, California, United States	
Win	12–3–1	Chris Navas	Submission (rear-naked choke)	Gladiator Challenge: Warrior's	March 7, 2015	1	0:49	El Cajon, California, United States	
Draw	11–3–1	Justin Baesman	Draw (majority)	Bellator 115	April 4, 2014	3	5:00	Reno, Nevada, United States	Terrado tested positive for Drostanolone Metabolites.
Loss	11–3	Rick Hawn	Decision (unanimous)	Bellator 100	September 20, 2013	3	5:00	Phoenix, Arizona, United States	Bellator Season Nine Welterweight Tournament Quarterfinal.
Win	11–2	Jordan Delano	TKO (punches)	Xplode Fight Series: Devastation	May 18, 2013	1	0:26	Valley Center, California, United States	
Win	10–2	Joey Apodaca	TKO (punches)	Xplode Fight Series: Revancha	March 16, 2013	1	0:15	Valley Center, California, United States	
Win	9–2	Chris Brown	Submission (armbar)	Strikeforce: Melendez vs. Masvidal	December 17, 2011	3	4:05	San Diego, California, United States	
Win	8–2	A.J. Matthews	KO (punch)	Strikeforce: Diaz vs. Daley	April 9, 2011	1	4:16	San Diego, California, United States	
Win	7–2	Roscoe Jackson	TKO (punches)	Desert Rage Full Contact Fighting 6	November 7, 2009	1	1:58	Yuma, Arizona, United States	
Win	6–2	Gabriel Godly	Submission (rear-naked choke)	Gladiator Challenge: High Impact	July 23, 2009	1	2:11	Pauma Valley, California, United States	
Win	5–2	Daniel Fair	Submission (triangle choke)	Gladiator Challenge: Venom	April 23, 2009	1	N/A	Pauma Valley, California, United States	
Loss	4–2	Marcio Navarro	Decision (unanimous)	Slammin Jammin Weekend 2	March 28, 2009	3	5:00	Red Rock, Oklahoma, United States	
Win	4–1	Shawn Sherril	TKO (punches)	Gladiator Challenge: Warriors	February 4, 2009	1	0:39	Pauma Valley, California, United States	
Win	3–1	Jeff Welsing	KO (punch)	Desert Rage Full Contact Fighting 4	November 8, 2008	1	4:13	Yuma, Arizona, United States	
Win	2–1	John Mercurio	TKO (elbows)	Total Combat 32	October 2, 2008	2	2:31	El Cajon, California, United States	
Win	1–1	Justin Ross	Submission (armbar)	Cage of Fire 12	May 3, 2008	1	1:35	Tijuana, Mexico	
Loss	0–1	Bobby Green	Submission (guillotine choke)	Cage of Fire 11	March 8, 2008	3	1:28	Tijuana, Mexico	Welterweight debut.

== See also ==
- List of current Bellator fighters
