= Eddie Gordon (fighter) =

Jamaican mixed martial arts fighter

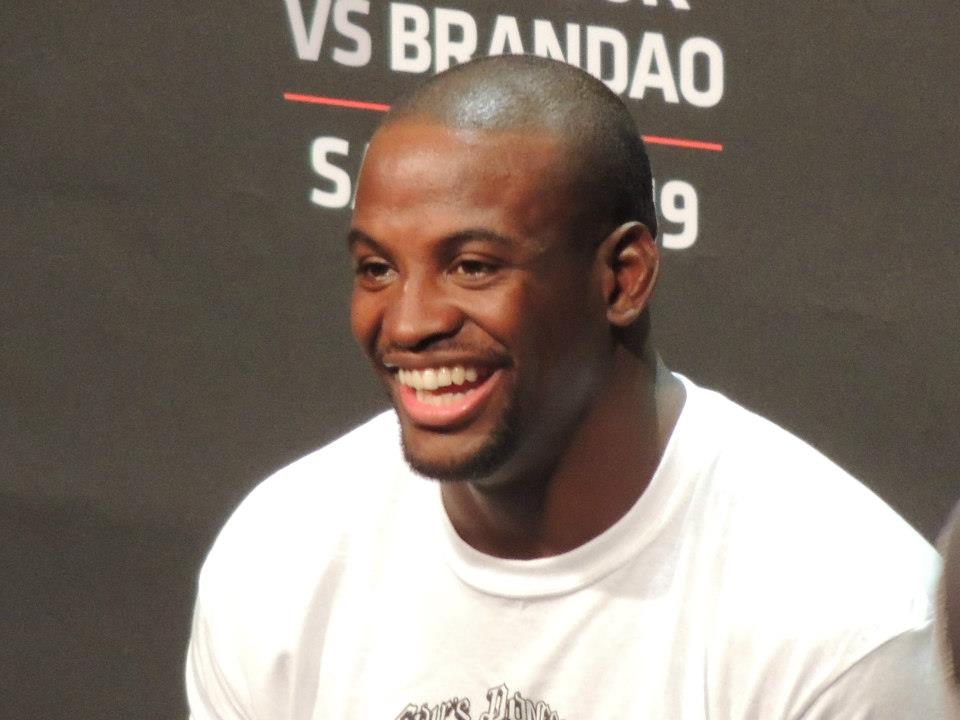
- Eddie Gordon at UFC Fight Night Dublin
- Born: July 22, 1983 (age 43); Montego Bay, Jamaica
- Other names: Truck
- Height: 6 ft 0 in (1.83 m)
- Weight: 170 lb (77 kg; 12 st)
- Division: Middleweight
- Reach: 75 in (190 cm)
- Style: Boxing
- Stance: Orthodox
- Fighting out of: Uniondale, New York
- Team: Serra-Longo Fight Team
- Rank: Blue belt in Brazilian Jiu-Jitsu under Matt Serra
- Years active: 2011–2018

Mixed martial arts record
- Total: 15
- Wins: 8
- By knockout: 3
- By submission: 1
- By decision: 4
- Losses: 7
- By knockout: 1
- By submission: 1
- By decision: 5

Amateur record
- Total: 3
- Wins: 3
- By knockout: 1
- By decision: 2
- Losses: 0

Other information
- Mixed martial arts record from Sherdog

Eddie Gordon (born July 22, 1983) is a Jamaican mixed martial artist who most recently competed in the Middleweight division of the Professional Fighters League. A professional since 2011, he has also competed for the UFC and was the winner of The Ultimate Fighter: Team Edgar vs. Team Penn.

== Background ==
Gordon attended Fordham University and graduated with a degree in finance and in marketing and communications. He worked as a finance director and then a sales consultant before pursuing MMA. He started training for MMA after running into his old high school friend Chris Weidman, who is the former UFC Middleweight champion.

== Mixed martial arts career ==
=== The Ultimate Fighter ===
Gordon was revealed as one of the cast members of the nineteenth season of The Ultimate Fighter on March 25, 2014. In the elimination rounds, he defeated Matt Gabel by unanimous decision after two rounds. He was then chosen as the third pick for the middleweights on coach Frankie Edgar's team.

In the quarter-final rounds, Gordon fought Team Penn's first middleweight pick Mike King. Gordon defeated King by unanimous decision after three rounds. Afterwards Dana White described the fight as "terrible" since he felt that the fighters had no sense of urgency to win. Gordon fought Cathal Pendred in the semi-finals. He won the bout by split decision, securing his place at the finale.

=== Ultimate Fighting Championship ===
Gordon faced teammate Dhiego Lima in the middleweight finals on July 6, 2014, at The Ultimate Fighter 19 Finale. He was victorious via first-round KO to become the middleweight tournament winner.

Gordon faced Josh Samman on December 6, 2014, at UFC 181. Despite winning the first round, Gordon lost the fight in the second round via knockout due to a head kick.

Gordon faced Chris Dempsey on April 18, 2015, at UFC on Fox: Machida vs. Rockhold. He lost the fight by split decision.

Gordon faced Antônio Carlos Júnior on June 27, 2015, at UFC Fight Night 70 Gordon lost the fight via submission in the third round.

On October 16, 2015, via his Facebook page Gordon announced that he had been released by the UFC.

=== Independent Promotions ===
Gordon made his return after over a year out of the cage on August 4, 2016, winning a split decision over Bellator veteran Chris Lozano at Cage Fury Fighting Championships 60 at the Borgata Hotel Casino and Spa in Atlantic City, New Jersey.

=== The Ultimate Fighter: Redemption ===
In February 2017, it was revealed that Gordon would again compete on the UFC's reality show in the 25th season on The Ultimate Fighter: Redemption. Gordon was the third pick overall for Team Garbrandt. He faced Tom Gallicchio and lost via submission in the opening round.

== Championships and accomplishments ==
- Ultimate Fighting Championship
  - The Ultimate Fighter 19 Tournament Winner
- Ring of Combat
  - Ring of Combat Light Heavyweight Championship (one time)

== Mixed martial arts record ==
Professional record breakdown
15 matches	8 wins	7 losses
By knockout	3	1
By submission	1	1
By decision	4	5

Res.	Record	Opponent	Method	Event	Date	Round	Time	Location	Notes
Loss	8–7	John Howard	Decision (unanimous)	PFL 10	October 20, 2018	2	5:00	Washington, D.C., United States	2018 PFL Middleweight Quarterfinal bout.
Loss	8–6	Gasan Umalatov	Decision (unanimous)	PFL 6	August 16, 2018	3	5:00	Atlantic City, New Jersey, United States	
Loss	8–5	Shamil Gamzatov	Decision (unanimous)	PFL 3	July 5, 2018	3	5:00	Washington, D.C., United States	
Win	8–4	Chris Lozano	Decision (split)	Cage Fury Fighting Championships 60	August 6, 2016	3	5:00	Atlantic City, New Jersey, United States	
Loss	7–4	Antônio Carlos Júnior	Submission (rear-naked choke)	UFC Fight Night: Machida vs. Romero	June 27, 2015	3	4:37	Hollywood, Florida, United States	
Loss	7–3	Chris Dempsey	Decision (split)	UFC on Fox: Machida vs. Rockhold	April 18, 2015	3	5:00	Newark, New Jersey, United States	
Loss	7–2	Josh Samman	KO (head kick)	UFC 181	December 6, 2014	2	3:08	Las Vegas, Nevada, United States	
Win	7–1	Dhiego Lima	KO (punches)	The Ultimate Fighter: Team Edgar vs. Team Penn Finale	July 6, 2014	1	1:11	Las Vegas, Nevada, United States	Middleweight debut; Won The Ultimate Fighter 19 Middleweight tournament.
Win	6–1	Oscar Delgado	Submission (rear-naked choke)	CFA 11	May 24, 2013	2	1:32	Coral Gables, Florida, United States	Catchweight (190 lbs) bout.
Loss	5–1	Anton Talamantes	Decision (unanimous)	Ring of Combat 42	September 14, 2012	3	5:00	Atlantic City, New Jersey, United States	Lost the Ring of Combat Light Heavyweight Championship
Win	5–0	Carlos Brooks	Decision (unanimous)	Ring of Combat 41	June 15, 2012	3	5:00	Atlantic City, New Jersey, United States	Won the Ring of Combat Light Heavyweight Championship.
Win	4–0	Ryan Contaldi	KO (punch)	Ring of Combat 40	April 27, 2012	1	2:58	Atlantic City, New Jersey, United States	
Win	3–0	David Tkeshelashvili	Decision (majority)	Ring of Combat 39	February 10, 2012	3	4:00	Atlantic City, New Jersey, United States	
Win	2–0	Steve Edwards	TKO (doctor stoppage)	Ring of Combat 37	September 9, 2011	2	4:00	Atlantic City, New Jersey, United States	
Win	1–0	J.A. Dudley	Decision (unanimous)	Ring of Combat 36	June 17, 2011	3	4:00	Atlantic City, New Jersey, United States	

== Mixed martial arts exhibition record ==
Exhibition record breakdown		
3 matches	3 wins	0 losses
By decision	3	0

Res.	Record	Opponent	Method	Event	Date	Round	Time	Location	Notes
Loss	3–1	Tom Gallicchio	Submission (rear-naked choke)	The Ultimate Fighter: Redemption	April 26, 2017 (airdate)	1		Las Vegas, Nevada, United States	TUF 25 elimination round.
Win	3–0	Cathal Pendred	Decision (split)	The Ultimate Fighter: Team Edgar vs. Team Penn	June 18, 2014 (airdate)	3	5:00	Las Vegas, Nevada, United States	TUF 19 semifinal round.
Win	2–0	Mike King	Decision (unanimous)	The Ultimate Fighter: Team Edgar vs. Team Penn	June 4, 2014 (airdate)	3	5:00	Las Vegas, Nevada, United States	TUF 19 preliminary round.
Win	1–0	Matt Gabel	Decision (unanimous)	The Ultimate Fighter: Team Edgar vs. Team Penn	April 16, 2014 (airdate)	2	5:00	Las Vegas, Nevada, United States	TUF 19 elimination round.

== See also ==
- List of male mixed martial artists
