= Jared Gooden =

American mixed martial arts fighter (born 1993)

- Born: Jared Alexander Gooden; December 5, 1993 (age 32); Birmingham, Alabama, U.S.
- Other names: Nite Train
- Height: 6 ft 0 in (1.83 m)
- Weight: 170 lb (77 kg; 12 st 2 lb)
- Division: Welterweight
- Reach: 77 in (196 cm)
- Stance: Orthodox
- Fighting out of: Norcross, Georgia, U.S.
- Team: SBG Buford (2011–2018); X3 Sports (2018–present)
- Trainer: Kelly Davis (striking)
- Rank: Brown belt in Brazilian jiu-jitsu under Phillipe Gentry
- Years active: 2015–2025

Mixed martial arts record
- Total: 35
- Wins: 23
- By knockout: 11
- By submission: 7
- By decision: 5
- Losses: 12
- By knockout: 3
- By decision: 9

Other information
- Mixed martial arts record from Sherdog

Jared Alexander Gooden (born December 5, 1993) is an American mixed martial artist who competes in the middleweight division of the Professional Fighters League. A professional since 2015, Gooden has also competed for Ultimate fighting championship Legacy Fighting Alliance and Titan Fighting Championships.

== Background ==
When Jared was 16 years old, he came across Matt Hughes and BJ Penn while flipping channels at his dad's house. He fell in love with the sport after watching the fight. A few years later, Jared saw a MMA fight poster come up on his Facebook feed and emailed the address that appeared on it. He would get a reply from the promoter, David Oblas, asking for his gym, length of training time and MMA record, all of which Jared did not have. David then sent him to a nearby gym run by Phillipe Gentry instead. He walked into Coach Phillipe's gym and started training at 17 years old on June 2, 2011.

== Mixed martial arts career ==
=== Early career ===
Gooden made his MMA debut at NFC 76, where he submitted Bobby Tucker via rear-naked choke in the second round. Gooden would win his next 5 bouts, before losing to Dave Vitkay at NFC 86 for the NFC Welterweight Championship via unanimous decision. Rebounding with a win via unanimous decision at NFC 89 against Micah Miller, he would lose to Julien Williams at NFC 94 via unanimous decision. Winning his next 7 bouts, culminating his one and only outing with Legacy Fighting Alliance at LFA 59, where he faced Steven Newell and went on to defeat him via unanimous decision. He would then fight at Titan FC 53: Bad Blood, where he faced Michael Graves for the interim Titan FC Welterweight Championship, however he lost the bout via unanimous decision. After defeating Will Santiago Jr via TKO in the first round at Jackson Wink Fight Night 5., he would return to Titan FC at Titan FC 55 against Bruno Oliveira, losing again but this time by TKO in the first round. He would win the next three bouts; tapping out Marcel Stamps in the second round via guillotine at Island Fights 60, Jay Jackson via rear-naked choke in the first at Empire FC 5 and finally Trent McCown via TKO in the 2nd round at Titan FC 62.

=== Ultimate Fighting Championship ===
Gooden made his UFC debut against Alan Jouban on November 21, 2020, at UFC 255. He lost the fight via unanimous decision.

Gooden faced Abubakar Nurmagomedov on March 27, 2021, at UFC 260. He lost the fight via unanimous decision.

Gooden, as a replacement for Mounir Lazzez, faced Niklas Stolze on July 31, 2021, at UFC on ESPN: Hall vs. Strickland. He won the fight via knockout in round one.

Gooden faced Randy Brown on October 9, 2021, at UFC Fight Night 194. At the weight-ins, Jared Gooden weighted 174 pounds, three pounds over the limit of non-championship welterweight bouts. The bout proceeded to a catchweight bout. Gooden was fined 20% of his purse and it went to his opponent Randy Brown. He lost the fight via unanimous decision.

On January 12, 2022, it was announced that Gooden's contract was not renewed.

=== Post-UFC ===
Gooden made his first appearance post-release at iKON FC 1 on January 21, 2022, against Aaron Highbaugh for the iKON FC middleweight title. He won the fight via unanimous decision.

Gooden faced Curtis Millender on April 2, 2022, at XMMA 4. He won the bout after dropping Millender in the second round with a leg kick and finishing him with ground and pound.

Gooden faced Impa Kasanganay at XMMA 5 on July 23, 2022. He lost the fight by a first-round TKO stoppage.

Gooden returned in October to face Doug Usher at NFC 150 for the NFC Middleweight Championship, winning the bout in the second round after Usher was unable to continue due to injury.

Gooden faced Demarques Jackson in the Quarter-finals of the Welterweight Grand Prix on February 18, 2023, at United Fight League 1, winning the bout in the second round via TKO stoppage.

=== Return to UFC ===
Gooden stepped in on three days notice to face Carlston Harris, replacing Abubakar Nurmagomedov, on March 11, 2023, at UFC Fight Night 221. At the weigh-ins, Gooden weighed in at 177 pounds, six pounds over the welterweight non-title fight limit. The bout proceeded at catchweight and he was fined 30% of his purse, which went to Harris. He lost the fight via unanimous decision.

Gooden faced Wellington Turman on December 2, 2023, at UFC on ESPN 52. He won the fight via rear-naked choke in round two, and this fight earned him the Performance of the Night award.

Gooden was scheduled to face Kevin Jousset on May 11, 2024 UFC on ESPN 56. However, for medical reasons, Gooden was unable to compete and the bout was cancelled.

Gooden faced Chidi Njokuani on October 12, 2024 at UFC Fight Night 244. At the weigh-ins, Gooden weighed in at 172.5 pounds, one and a half pounds over the welterweight non-title fight limit. The bout proceeded at catchweight and Gooden was fined 20 percent of his purse which went to Njokuani. He lost the fight by unanimous decision.

On December 21, 2024, it was reported that Gooden was removed from the UFC roster.

On March 31, 2025, it was reported that Gooden had retired from mixed martial arts competition.

=== Professional Fighters League ===
Gooden came back from retirement and made his PFL debut against Boris Mbarga Atangana on May 23, 2026, at PFL Brussels. He lost the fight via knockout in round one.

== Championships and accomplishments ==
=== Mixed martial arts ===
- National Fighting Championship
  - NFC Welterweight Championship (One time)
    - One successful title defence
  - NFC Middleweight Championship (One time)
- Ultimate Fighting Championship
  - Performance of the Night (One time) vs. Wellington Turman

== Mixed martial arts record ==
Professional record breakdown
35 matches	23 wins	12 losses
By knockout	11	3
By submission	7	0
By decision	5	9

Res.	Record	Opponent	Method	Event	Date	Round	Time	Location	Notes
Loss	23–12	Boris Mbarga Atangana	KO (punches)	PFL Brussels: Habirora vs. Henderson	May 23, 2026	1	1:05	Brussels, Belgium	Return to Middleweight.
Loss	23–11	Mahamed Aly	Decision (unanimous)	Shogun Fights 30	March 29, 2025	3	5:00	Hanover, Maryland, United States	Light Heavyweight debut.
Loss	23–10	Chidi Njokuani	Decision (unanimous)	UFC Fight Night: Royval vs. Taira	October 12, 2024	3	5:00	Las Vegas, Nevada, United States	Catchweight (172.5 lb) bout; Gooden missed weight.
Win	23–9	Wellington Turman	Submission (rear-naked choke)	UFC on ESPN: Dariush vs. Tsarukyan	December 2, 2023	2	1:11	Austin, Texas, United States	Performance of the Night.
Loss	22–9	Carlston Harris	Decision (unanimous)	UFC Fight Night: Yan vs. Dvalishvili	March 11, 2023	3	5:00	Las Vegas, Nevada, United States	Catchweight (177 lb) bout; Gooden missed weight.
Win	22–8	Demarques Jackson	TKO (punches)	United Fight League 1	February 18, 2023	2	0:50	Mesa, Arizona, United States	Return to Welterweight. UFL Welterweight Grand Prix Quarter-finals
Win	21–8	Doug Usher	TKO (injury)	NFC 150	October 15, 2022	2	4:55	Atlanta, Georgia, United States	Won the NFC Middleweight Championship.
Loss	20–8	Impa Kasanganay	TKO (punches)	XMMA 5	July 23, 2022	1	3:16	Columbia, South Carolina, United States	
Win	20–7	Curtis Millender	TKO (leg kick and punches)	XMMA 4	April 2, 2022	2	0:16	New Orleans, Louisiana, United States	Welterweight bout.
Win	19–7	Aaron Highbaugh	Decision (unanimous)	Jorge Masvidal's iKON FC 1	January 21, 2022	3	5:00	West Palm Beach, Florida, United States	Return to Middleweight.
Loss	18–7	Randy Brown	Decision (unanimous)	UFC Fight Night: Dern vs. Rodriguez	October 9, 2021	3	5:00	Las Vegas, Nevada, United States	Catchweight (174 lb) bout; Gooden missed weight.
Win	18–6	Niklas Stolze	KO (punch)	UFC on ESPN: Hall vs. Strickland	July 31, 2021	1	1:08	Las Vegas, Nevada, United States	
Loss	17–6	Abubakar Nurmagomedov	Decision (unanimous)	UFC 260	March 27, 2021	3	5:00	Las Vegas, Nevada, United States	
Loss	17–5	Alan Jouban	Decision (unanimous)	UFC 255	November 21, 2020	3	5:00	Las Vegas, Nevada, United States	
Win	17–4	Trent McCown	TKO (punches and elbows)	Titan FC 62	July 23, 2020	2	2:31	Miami, Florida, United States	Return to Welterweight.
Win	16–4	Jay Jackson	Submission (rear-naked choke)	Empire FC 5	February 29, 2020	1	1:45	Biloxi, Mississippi, United States	
Win	15–4	Marcel Stamps	Submission (guillotine choke)	Island Fights 60	October 10, 2019	2	2:18	Columbus, Georgia, United States	
Loss	14–4	Bruno Oliveira	TKO (punches and knee)	Titan FC 55	June 28, 2019	1	0:53	Fort Lauderdale, Florida, United States	Return to Middleweight.
Win	14–3	Will Santiago	TKO (knee and punches)	JacksonWink Fight Night 5	May 10, 2019	1	0:28	Albuquerque, New Mexico, United States	
Loss	13–3	Michael Graves	Decision (unanimous)	Titan FC 53	March 15, 2019	5	5:00	Fort Lauderdale, Florida, United States	For the interim Titan FC Welterweight Championship.
Win	13–2	Steven Newell	Decision (unanimous)	LFA 59	February 1, 2019	3	5:00	Phoenix, Arizona, United States	Catchweight (180 lb) bout.
Win	12–2	Cody Wilson	TKO (superman punch)	864 FC: Fight 7	September 29, 2018	3	0:24	Greenville, South Carolina, United States	
Win	11–2	Ladarious Jackson	KO (flying knee)	NFC 108	June 22, 2018	3	0:07	Kennesaw, Georgia, United States	Middleweight bout.
Win	10–2	Sean Kilgus	TKO (punches)	NFC 105	March 30, 2018	1	4:59	Kennesaw, Georgia, United States	Defended the NFC Welterweight Championship.
Win	9–2	Elijah Wynter	Decision (unanimous)	NFC 99	September 22, 2017	3	5:00	Atlanta, Georgia, United States	Won the NFC Welterweight Championship.
Win	8–2	Wesley Golden	Submission (rear-naked choke)	NFC 96	June 30, 2017	2	1:53	Kennesaw, Georgia, United States	
Loss	7–2	Julien Williams	Decision (unanimous)	NFC 94	April 22, 2017	3	5:00	Atlanta, Georgia, United States	
Win	7–1	Micah Miller	Decision (unanimous)	NFC 89	December 9, 2016	3	5:00	Atlanta, Georgia, United States	
Loss	6–1	Dave Vitkay	Decision (unanimous)	NFC 86	August 27, 2016	3	5:00	Atlanta, Georgia, United States	For the NFC Welterweight Championship.
Win	6–0	Amir Dadovic	Decision (unanimous)	NFC 84	June 11, 2016	3	5:00	Atlanta, Georgia, United States	
Win	5–0	Tanner Saraceno	TKO (punches)	NFC 83	March 25, 2016	2	1:45	Atlanta, Georgia, United States	
Win	4–0	Smith Amisial	Submission (rear-naked choke)	OCF Fight Night 1	January 22, 2016	2	2:09	Fern Park, Florida, United States	Return to Welterweight.
Win	3–0	Nick Poythress	TKO (doctor stoppage)	NFC 80	December 5, 2015	3	3:10	Atlanta, Georgia, United States	
Win	2–0	Brad Taylor	Submission (armbar)	Legacy FC 47	October 16, 2015	3	2:01	Atlanta, Georgia, United States	Middleweight debut.
Win	1–0	Bobby Tucker	Submission (triangle choke)	NFC 76	August 8, 2015	2	4:02	Atlanta, Georgia, United States	Welterweight debut.

== See also ==
- List of male mixed martial artists
