= UFC 181 =

UFC mixed martial arts event in 2014

UFC 181: Hendricks vs. Lawler II
- The poster for UFC 181: Hendricks vs. Lawler II
- Promotion: Ultimate Fighting Championship
- Date: December 6, 2014
- Venue: Mandalay Bay Events Center
- City: Las Vegas, Nevada
- Attendance: 11,617
- Total gate: $2.488 million
- Buyrate: 400,000

Event chronology
| UFC Fight Night: Edgar vs. Swanson | UFC 181: Hendricks vs. Lawler II | The Ultimate Fighter: A Champion Will Be Crowned Finale |

UFC 181: Hendricks vs. Lawler II was a mixed martial arts event held on December 6, 2014, at Mandalay Bay Events Center in Las Vegas, Nevada.

== Background ==
UFC 181 was the organization's 300th event and was expected to be headlined by a Middleweight Championship bout between the current champion Chris Weidman and top contender Vitor Belfort. However, on September 22, it was announced that Weidman had suffered a broken hand and the bout was again rescheduled to take place at UFC 184. The new main event was a Welterweight championship rematch between champion Johny Hendricks and number one contender Robbie Lawler. Their first fight at UFC 171 ended in a unanimous decision victory in favor of the reigning champion.

Co-featured on the card was a Lightweight Championship bout, which also served as the coaches bout for The Ultimate Fighter Season 20, as current champion Anthony Pettis made his first title defense against Gilbert Melendez.

Gian Villante was expected to face Corey Anderson at the event. However, Villante pulled out of the fight citing an injury and was replaced by Jonathan Wilson. A few days later, it was announced that Wilson was forced out of the fight and undefeated newcomer Justin Jones took his place.

Touted newcomer, Holly Holm was expected to face Raquel Pennington at this event. However, Holm pulled out of the fight in mid-November, citing a neck injury. Holm was replaced by UFC newcomer Ashlee Evans-Smith.

The unique poster and keyart for the event featured a comicbook style fight scene, drawn by noted DC Comics artist Howard Porter.

During the PPV broadcast, it was announced that former professional wrestler and WWE Champion CM Punk had signed a multi-fight deal and was expected to debut in 2015, but after an injury ultimately debuted in September 2016.

A month subsequent to the event, on January 7, 2015, it was revealed that Ashlee Evans-Smith had failed her post-fight drug test, testing positive for a diuretic. On February 17, the Nevada State Athletic Commission ultimately decided to issue a nine-month suspension and fined her 30 percent of her purse ($2,400). She also was required to pass an additional drug test at the conclusion of her suspension before getting clearance to fight.

== Results ==
Main Card
| Weight class | | | | Method | Round | Time | Notes |
|---|---|---|---|---|---|---|---|
| Welterweight | Robbie Lawler | def. | Johny Hendricks (c) | Decision (split) (48–47, 47–48, 49–46) | 5 | 5:00 | (Note: For the UFC Welterweight Championship.) |
| Lightweight | Anthony Pettis (c) | def. | Gilbert Melendez | Submission (guillotine choke) | 2 | 1:53 | (Note: For the UFC Lightweight Championship.) |
| Heavyweight | Travis Browne | def. | Brendan Schaub | TKO (punches) | 1 | 4:50 |
| Heavyweight | Todd Duffee | def. | Anthony Hamilton | KO (punch) | 1 | 0:33 |
| Lightweight | Tony Ferguson | def. | Abel Trujillo | Submission (rear-naked choke) | 2 | 4:19 |
Preliminary Card (Fox Sports 1)
| Bantamweight | Urijah Faber | def. | Francisco Rivera | Submission (bulldog choke) | 2 | 1:34 |
| Middleweight | Josh Samman | def. | Eddie Gordon | KO (head kick) | 2 | 3:08 |
| Light Heavyweight | Corey Anderson | def. | Justin Jones | Decision (unanimous) (30–27, 30–27, 30–26) | 3 | 5:00 |
| Women's Bantamweight | Raquel Pennington | def. | Ashlee Evans-Smith | Technical Submission (bulldog choke) | 1 | 4:59 | (Note: Evans-Smith tested positive for a diuretic in her post-fight drug test.) |
Preliminary Card (UFC Fight Pass)
| Bantamweight | Sergio Pettis | def. | Matt Hobar | Decision (unanimous) (29–28, 29–28, 30–27) | 3 | 5:00 |
| Featherweight | Clay Collard | def. | Alex White | Decision (unanimous) (29–28, 29–28, 29–28) | 3 | 5:00 |

== Bonus awards ==
The following fighters were awarded $50,000 bonuses:

- Fight of the Night: Sergio Pettis vs. Matt Hobar
- Performance of the Night: Anthony Pettis and Josh Samman

== Reported payout ==
The following is the reported payout to the fighters as reported to the Nevada State Athletic Commission. It does not include sponsor money and also does not include the UFC's traditional "fight night" bonuses.

- Robbie Lawler: $220,000 (includes $110,000 win bonus) def. Johny Hendricks: $150,000
- Anthony Pettis: $200,000 (includes $100,000 win bonus) def. Gilbert Melendez: $200,000
- Travis Browne: $100,000 (includes $50,000 win bonus) def. Brendan Schaub: $32,000
- Todd Duffee: $20,000 (includes $10,000 win bonus) def. Anthony Hamilton: $10,000
- Tony Ferguson: $48,000 (includes $24,000 win bonus) def. Abel Trujillo: $14,000
- Urijah Faber: $140,000 (includes $70,000 win bonus) def. Francisco Rivera: $20,000
- Josh Samman: $16,000 (includes $8,000 win bonus) def. Eddie Gordon: $15,000
- Corey Anderson: $30,000 (includes $15,000 win bonus) def. Justin Jones: $8,000
- Raquel Pennington: $20,000 (includes $10,000 win bonus) def. Ashlee Evans-Smith: $8,000
- Sergio Pettis: $30,000 (includes $15,000 win bonus) def. Matt Hobar: $10,000
- Clay Collard: $16,000 (includes $8,000 win bonus) def. Alex White: $8,000

== See also ==
- List of UFC events
- 2014 in UFC
