= Josh Samman =

American mixed martial arts fighter

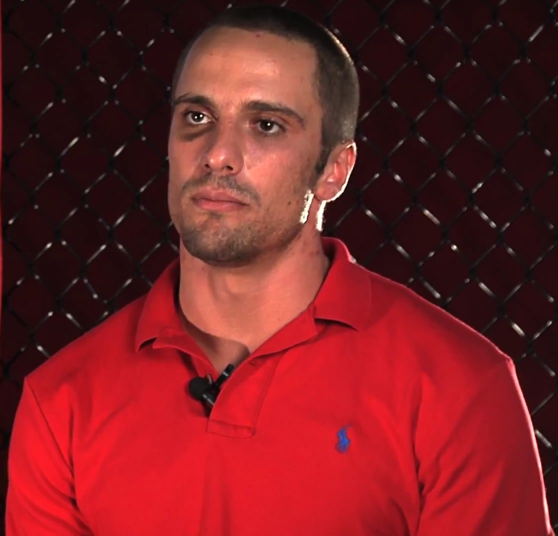
- Born: Joshua Kaleb Samman; March 14, 1988; Des Moines, Iowa, U.S.
- Died: October 5, 2016 (aged 28); Hollywood, Florida, U.S.
- Height: 6 ft 3 in (1.91 m)
- Weight: 186 lb (84 kg; 13.3 st)
- Division: Middleweight
- Reach: 79 in (200 cm)
- Stance: Orthodox
- Fighting out of: Tallahassee, Florida, U.S.
- Team: MMA Masters
- Rank: Brown belt in Brazilian Jiu-Jitsu under Daniel Valverde
- Years active: 2006–2016

Mixed martial arts record
- Total: 16
- Wins: 12
- By knockout: 7
- By submission: 4
- By decision: 1
- Losses: 4
- By knockout: 1
- By submission: 2
- By decision: 1

Other information
- Mixed martial arts record from Sherdog

Joshua Kaleb Samman (March 14, 1988 – October 5, 2016) was an American mixed martial artist who, at the time of his death, competed in the Middleweight division of the Ultimate Fighting Championship, and also competed for Bellator MMA.

== Mixed martial arts career ==
=== Early career ===
Following amateur MMA fights in 2006, Samman made his professional MMA debut in 2007. Over the next five years, he amassed a record of 9 wins and 2 losses before joining the cast of The Ultimate Fighter.

=== The Ultimate Fighter ===
In January 2013, it was revealed that Samman was a cast member of The Ultimate Fighter: Team Jones vs. Team Sonnen. He won his preliminary bout over Leo Bercier via TKO in the first round. However, he drew the ire of both coaches and Dana White for what they perceived to be showboating during his bout. Samman was selected by coach Jones as his second pick (fourth overall).

In the next round, Samman defeated Tor Troéng by knockout in the first round. In the quarter final round, Samman defeated Jimmy Quinlan via submission in the first round. In the semi-finals, he faced eventual tournament winner Kelvin Gastelum. Despite being considered a heavy favorite by both coaches, Samman was quickly taken down by Gastelum and eventually submitted in the first round.

=== Ultimate Fighting Championship ===
On April 9, 2013, it was announced that Samman would face fellow season 17 alumni Kevin Casey at The Ultimate Fighter 17 Finale. After a close first round, Samman won the fight via TKO in the second round.

Samman was to replace Nick Ring against his former The Ultimate Fighter 17 rival Uriah Hall on August 17, 2013, at UFC Fight Night 26. However, on July 17, he was taken out of the bout after an undisclosed injury.

Samman was expected to face Caio Magalhães on April 19, 2014, at UFC on Fox 11 but was forced to withdraw after tearing his left hamstring.

Samman faced Eddie Gordon on December 6, 2014, at UFC 181. After losing the first round, he came back in the second round to land a left switch head kick on Gordon, knocking him out in what was considered one of the best knockouts of 2014. Samman's knockout earned him his first Performance of the Night bonus award.

Samman faced Caio Magalhães on July 12, 2015, at The Ultimate Fighter 21 Finale. He won the fight via rear naked choke in the first round which also earned a Performance of the Night bonus.

Samman faced returning veteran Tamdan McCrory on December 19, 2015, at UFC on Fox 17. He lost the back-and-forth fight via submission in the third round.

Samman next faced Tim Boetsch on July 13, 2016, at UFC Fight Night 91. He lost the fight via TKO in the second round.

== Literary work ==
Samman is the author of The Housekeeper: Love, Death, and Prizefighting, which chronicles his struggles with addiction; career-threatening injuries and the death of his girlfriend.

Samman was a long time contributor to SB Nation's website Bloody Elbow, and in August 2014, Samman started submitting Fanposts regularly to the website. In March 2015, BloodyElbow.com announced that Samman would become officially part of the staff and would be joining the website as a feature author.

Samman was also a columnist for UFC.com. In May 2016, Samman announced he would be contributing to an additional MMA website, flocombat.com.

== Combat Night ==
In 2009, Samman began promoting a mixed martial arts event in Tallahassee, Florida, dubbed “Ubersmash,” which featured Samman as the headliner and other local fighters on the bill. When Florida legislation passed that allowed for the creation of amateur MMA sanctioning bodies, Samman and his business partner immediately set out to create Combat Night, which has since expanded to Jacksonville, Orlando, and Miami to become the largest MMA organization in the state.

On Saturday, September 26, 2015, Samman and his business partner celebrated a successful 50th edition of Combat Night, drawing 4,000 fans to an amateur MMA show in Tallahassee, Florida.

== Personal life ==
On August 30, 2013, Samman's girlfriend Hailey Bevis died in a single-car accident while the two were texting each other, as she drove.

On September 29, 2016, Samman and a friend, Troy Kirkingburg, were found unresponsive in a South Florida apartment due to a drug overdose. His friend, an MMA announcer for a local Florida promotion, was pronounced dead from an overdose of cocaine, heroin and pain killers upon arrival at the hospital, while Samman remained in critical condition and in a coma. Samman died on October 5, 2016.

== Championships and accomplishments ==
=== Mixed martial arts ===
- Ultimate Fighting Championship
  - Performance of the Night (Two times) vs. Eddie Gordon and Caio Magalhães
  - UFC.com Awards
    - 2014: Ranked #3 Knockout of the Year vs. Eddie Gordon
- MMA Junkie
  - 2014 December Knockout of the Month vs. Eddie Gordon
- Yahoo Sports
  - 2014 Finish of the Year vs. Eddie Gordon at UFC 181

== Mixed martial arts record ==
Professional record breakdown
16 matches	12 wins	4 losses
By knockout	7	1
By submission	4	2
By decision	1	1

Res.	Record	Opponent	Method	Event	Date	Round	Time	Location	Notes
Loss	12–4	Tim Boetsch	TKO (punches)	UFC Fight Night: McDonald vs. Lineker	July 13, 2016	2	3:49	Sioux Falls, South Dakota, United States	
Loss	12–3	Tamdan McCrory	Submission (triangle choke)	UFC on Fox: dos Anjos vs. Cowboy 2	December 19, 2015	3	4:10	Orlando, Florida, United States	
Win	12–2	Caio Magalhães	Submission (rear-naked choke)	The Ultimate Fighter: American Top Team vs. Blackzilians Finale	July 12, 2015	1	2:52	Las Vegas, Nevada, United States	Performance of the Night.
Win	11–2	Eddie Gordon	KO (head kick)	UFC 181	December 6, 2014	2	3:08	Las Vegas, Nevada, United States	Performance of the Night.
Win	10–2	Kevin Casey	TKO (knees)	The Ultimate Fighter: Team Jones vs. Team Sonnen Finale	April 13, 2013	2	2:17	Las Vegas, Nevada, United States	
Win	9–2	Mikey Gomez	Submission (punches)	XFC 16	February 10, 2012	2	2:17	Knoxville, Tennessee, United States	
Loss	8–2	Dan Cramer	Decision (unanimous)	Bellator 46	June 25, 2011	3	5:00	Hollywood, Florida, United States	
Win	8–1	John Walsh	TKO (punches)	Moon Management: Ubersmash 4	August 28, 2010	1	1:19	Tallahassee, Florida, United States	
Win	7–1	David Baggett	Submission (triangle choke)	Moon Management: Ubersmash 3	April 24, 2010	1	1:20	Tallahassee, Florida, United States	
Win	6–1	Chris Cope	KO (punches)	Moon Management: Ubersmash 2	January 23, 2010	1	0:56	Tallahassee, Florida, United States	
Win	5–1	Colby McMahon	TKO (punches)	Moon Management: Ubersmash 1	October 3, 2009	1	2:23	Tallahassee, Florida, United States	
Win	4–1	Ryan Hodge	Submission (choke)	WWCF: Blood War	November 29, 2008	2	2:41	Ormond Beach, Florida, United States	
Loss	3–1	John Walsh	Submission (arm-triangle choke)	ISCF: Unleashed	March 28, 2008	1	0:48	North Carolina, United States	
Win	3–0	Michael Shoffner	TKO (punches)	Reality Combat Championship 2: The Second Encounter	March 1, 2008	1	1:24	Jacksonville, Florida, United States	
Win	2–0	Michael Adams	TKO (punches)	ISCF: Winnersville Wars	September 15, 2007	2	0:52	Valdosta, Georgia, United States	
Win	1–0	Travis Miller	Decision (unanimous)	Reality Combat Championship 1	April 28, 2007	3	5:00	Jacksonville, Florida, United States	

=== Mixed martial arts exhibition record ===
Exhibition record breakdown		
4 matches	3 wins	1 loss
By knockout	2	0
By submission	1	1
By decision	0	0

Res.	Record	Opponent	Method	Event	Date	Round	Time	Location	Notes
Loss	3–1	Kelvin Gastelum	Submission (rear-naked choke)	The Ultimate Fighter: Team Jones vs. Team Sonnen		1	4:03	Las Vegas, Nevada, United States	Semi-finals.
Win	3–0	Jimmy Quinlan	Submission (punches)	The Ultimate Fighter: Team Jones vs. Team Sonnen		1	4:38	Las Vegas, Nevada, United States	Quarter-finals.
Win	2–0	Tor Troeng	KO (punches)	The Ultimate Fighter: Team Jones vs. Team Sonnen		1	4:02	Las Vegas, Nevada, United States	Preliminary bout.
Win	1–0	Lou Bercier	TKO (punches)	The Ultimate Fighter: Team Jones vs. Team Sonnen		1	1:49	Las Vegas, Nevada, United States	Entry bout.

== See also ==
- List of male mixed martial artists
