= Paul Bradley (fighter) =

American mixed martial arts fighter

- Born: June 13, 1983 (age 43); Tama, Iowa, United States
- Other names: The Gentleman (aka Sabertooth)
- Height: 5 ft 9 in (1.75 m)
- Weight: 170 lb (77 kg; 12 st)
- Division: Welterweight (170 lb); Middleweight (185 lb)
- Reach: 72 in (183 cm)
- Style: Freestyle Wrestling
- Fighting out of: San Diego, CA, United States
- Team: Alliance MMA (2013–2019); Minnesota Martial Arts Academy (2009–2012)
- Wrestling: NCAA Division I Wrestling
- Years active: 2006–present

Mixed martial arts record
- Total: 35
- Wins: 23
- By knockout: 8
- By submission: 7
- By decision: 8
- Losses: 10
- By knockout: 3
- By decision: 7
- No contests: 2

Other information
- University: University of Iowa
- Notable school: South Tama High School
- Mixed martial arts record from Sherdog

Paul Bradley (born June 13, 1983) is a retired American mixed martial artist who competed mostly in the Welterweight division. A professional competitor since 2006, Bradley has also fought in the Bellator MMA, UFC, Strikeforce, Shark Fights, King of the Cage, PFL, and was a contestant on The Ultimate Fighter: Team Rampage vs. Team Forrest.

== Background ==
Born and raised in Tama, Iowa, Bradley competed in wrestling at South Tama High School where he was a state champion in his senior season, in addition to runner-up finishes as a junior and sophomore. Bradley was also a Cadet National Champion as a freshman, and earned in two letters in football as well as one in baseball. In football, Bradley won All-Conference honors as a senior and compiled an overall record in wrestling of 168-18 before continuing his career at the University of Iowa. At Iowa, Bradley was a two-time All-American and finished as high as fourth at the NCAA Championships. After graduating, Bradley coached wrestling at the University of Buffalo and Indiana University before transitioning into mixed martial arts.

== Mixed martial arts career ==
=== Early career ===
Bradley started his career in 2006. He fought mainly for Indiana's promotion Legends of Fighting Championship. In March 2008, Bradley was announced as a cast member of The Ultimate Fighter.

=== The Ultimate Fighter ===
Bradley was a contestant in The Ultimate Fighter: Team Rampage vs. Team Forrest. He defeated Reggie Orr during the entry via unanimous decision.

He was picked to be a member of Team Rampage, but had to leave the house due to a neck rash caused by herpes gladiatorum, which could possibly be transmitted to the other fighters.

=== Strikeforce ===
Bradley made his debut against Levi Avera on September 25, 2009, at Strikeforce Challengers: Kennedy vs. Cummings. He won via unanimous decision.

Bradley faced Luke Rockhold on February 26, 2010, at Strikeforce Challengers: Kaufman vs. Hashi. He lost via TKO in the first round.

=== Ultimate Fighting Championship ===
Bradley made his debut on short notice against Rafael Natal on August 6, 2011, at UFC 133. He lost via unanimous decision.

Bradley had a rematch against Mike Pierce on November 12, 2011, at UFC on Fox: Velasquez vs. dos Santos. He lost via split decision and was subsequently released from the promotion.

=== Bellator MMA ===
Bradley made his promotional debut against Karl Amoussou on October 18, 2013, at Bellator 104. He won the fight via unanimous decision.

In March 2014, he entered into the Bellator Season 10 Welterweight Tournament. He faced Nathan Coy in the opening round on March 14, 2014, at Bellator 112 and lost the fight via unanimous decision.

Bradley faced Josh Neer in the main event at Bellator 129 on October 17, 2014. He won the fight by unanimous decision.

Bradley faced Chris Honeycutt at Bellator 140 on July 17, 2015. The fight ended midway through the second round after an accidental clash of heads between the two fighters, resulting in a cut on Bradley that the doctor deemed too bad to allow the fighter to continue. The official result was a No Contest. A rematch with Honeycutt was held on January 29, 2016, at Bellator 148. Despite again being the betting underdog, Bradley won the bout via TKO early in the first round.

== Championships and accomplishments ==
=== Amateur wrestling ===
- National Collegiate Athletic Association
  - NCAA Division I All-American out of University of Iowa (2003–04)
  - NCAA Division I 184 lb: Fourth place out of University of Iowa (2003)
  - NCAA Division I 184 lb: Fifth place out of University of Iowa (2004)
  - Big Ten Conference 184 lb: Runner-up out of University of Iowa (2003)
  - Big Ten Conference 184 lb: Fourth place out of University of Iowa (2004)
  - Big Ten Conference 184 lb: Seventh place out of University of Iowa (2005)

=== Mixed martial arts ===
- Ring of Combat
  - ROC Middleweight Championship (One time)

== Mixed martial arts record ==
Professional record breakdown
35 matches	23 wins	10 losses
By knockout	8	3
By submission	7	0
By decision	8	7
No contests	2	

Res.	Record	Opponent	Method	Event	Date	Round	Time	Location	Notes
Loss	23–10 (2)	Handesson Ferreira	TKO (punches)	PFL 7	August 30, 2018	1	0:20	Atlantic City, New Jersey, United States	
Loss	23–9 (2)	João Zeferino	TKO (punches)	PFL 3	July 5, 2018	1	1:58	Washington, DC, United States	
Loss	23–8 (2)	Alexander Shlemenko	Decision (unanimous)	M-1 Challenge 75 - Shlemenko vs. Bradley	March 3, 2017	3	5:00	Moscow, Russia	Middleweight bout
Loss	23–7 (2)	Yushin Okami	Decision (split)	WSOF 34	December 31, 2016	3	5:00	New York City, New York, United States	
Win	23–6 (2)	Chris Honeycutt	TKO (punches)	Bellator 148	January 29, 2016	1	0:40	Fresno, California, United States	
NC	22–6 (2)	Chris Honeycutt	NC (accidental headbutt)	Bellator 140	July 17, 2015	2	2:47	Uncasville, Connecticut, United States	
Win	22–6 (1)	Josh Neer	Decision (unanimous)	Bellator 129	October 17, 2014	3	5:00	Council Bluffs, Iowa, United States	
Loss	21–6 (1)	Nathan Coy	Decision (unanimous)	Bellator 112	March 14, 2014	3	5:00	Hammond, Indiana, United States	Bellator Season 10 Welterweight Tournament Quarterfinal
Win	21–5 (1)	Karl Amoussou	Decision (unanimous)	Bellator 104	October 18, 2013	3	5:00	Cedar Rapids, Iowa, United States	
Loss	20–5 (1)	Valdir Araújo	Decision (split)	CFA 8: Araújo vs. Bradley	October 6, 2012	3	5:00	Coral Gables, Florida, United States	
Win	20–4 (1)	Keith Smetana	TKO (punches)	Downtown Showdown 6	June 22, 2012	2	2:37	Minneapolis, Minnesota, United States	
Win	19–4 (1)	Ryan Braun	Submission (arm-triangle choke)	Downtown Showdown 4	April 7, 2012	2	2:11	Minneapolis, Minnesota, United States	
Loss	18–4 (1)	Mike Pierce	Decision (split)	UFC on Fox: Velasquez vs. dos Santos	November 12, 2011	3	5:00	Anaheim, California, United States	Welterweight bout
Loss	18–3 (1)	Rafael Natal	Decision (unanimous)	UFC 133	August 6, 2011	3	5:00	Philadelphia, Pennsylvania, United States	Middleweight bout
Win	18–2 (1)	Eddie Larrea	Submission (arm-triangle choke)	Extreme Challenge 188	July 23, 2011	1	2:54	Minneapolis, Minnesota, United States	
Win	17–2 (1)	Kenneth Allen	Submission (guillotine choke)	Extreme Challenge 183	May 14, 2011	1	0:45	Black River Falls, Wisconsin, United States	
Win	16–2 (1)	Anton Tomash	TKO (punches)	Meskwaki Mayhem	May 7, 2011	1	1:27	Tama, Iowa, United States	
Win	15–2 (1)	Ted Worthington	Submission (neck crank)	CFX: Extreme Challenge on Target	December 11, 2010	3	2:31	Minneapolis, Minnesota, United States	
Win	14–2 (1)	Johnny Rees	Submission (rear-naked choke)	Shark Fights 13: Jardine vs Prangley	September 11, 2010	1	4:28	Amarillo, Texas, United States	
NC	13–2 (1)	Sam Alvey	No contest (rainfall)	KOTC: Chain Reaction	July 17, 2010	N/A	N/A	Lac du Flambeau, Wisconsin, United States	
Loss	13–2	Luke Rockhold	TKO (knees to the body)	Strikeforce Challengers: Kaufman vs. Hashi	February 26, 2010	1	2:24	San Jose, California, United States	
Win	13–1	Levi Avera	Decision (unanimous)	Strikeforce Challengers: Kennedy vs. Cummings	September 25, 2009	3	5:00	Tulsa, Oklahoma, United States	176 lb Catchweight bout
Win	12–1	Leonardo Pecanha	Decision (unanimous)	UCFC: Rumble on the Rivers	June 27, 2009	3	5:00	Pittsburgh, Pennsylvania, United States	
Loss	11–1	Mike Pierce	Decision (unanimous)	RIE 2: Brotherly Love Brawl	April 30, 2009	3	5:00	Oaks, Pennsylvania, United States	
Win	11–0	Nathan Coy	Decision (split)	WCA: Pure Combat	February 6, 2009	3	5:00	Atlantic City, New Jersey, United States	
Win	10–0	Dante Rivera	TKO (punches)	Ring of Combat 22	November 21, 2008	1	0:34	Atlantic City, New Jersey, United States	Won ROC Middleweight Championship
Win	9–0	Patrick Horner	Decision (unanimous)	NAAFS: Caged Fury 5	October 4, 2008	3	5:00	Cleveland, Ohio, United States	
Win	8–0	De'marco Harris	Decision (unanimous)	Evening in the Cage 2	July 19, 2008	3	5:00	Fort Walton Beach, Florida, United States	
Win	7–0	D.J. Watkins	TKO (punches)	Destiny Fight 1	March 15, 2008	1	2:27	Fort Walton Beach, Florida, United States	
Win	6–0	Mike van Meer	TKO (punches)	Masters of the Cage 16	September 28, 2007	3	3:58	Oklahoma City, Oklahoma, United States	
Win	5–0	Ryan Braun	Submission (rear-naked choke)	Title Fighting Championships	June 30, 2007	1	0:56	Des Moines, Iowa, United States	
Win	4–0	Troy King	Decision (majority)	LOF 15: Vengeance	April 27, 2007	3	5:00	Indianapolis, Indiana, United States	
Win	3–0	Joe Neace	TKO (punches)	LOF Revolution 4	April 13, 2007	1	2:01	Plainfield, Indiana, United States	
Win	2–0	Adam Stoup	TKO (corner stoppage)	LOF 12: Black Tie Battles	December 31, 2006	2	5:00	Indianapolis, Indiana, United States	
Win	1–0	James Powell	Submission (guillotine choke)	LOF: Fright Night	October 28, 2006	1	N/A	Indianapolis, Indiana, United States	

== See also ==
- List of Bellator MMA alumni
