= Shamil Gamzatov =

Russian mixed martial arts fighter (born 1990)

Shamil Gamzatov Шамиль Гамзатов
- Born: August 9, 1990 (age 36); Kizlyar, Dagestan, Russian SFSR, Soviet Union
- Nationality: Russian; Turkish
- Height: 1.87 m (6 ft 2 in)
- Weight: 218 lb (99 kg; 15.6 st)
- Division: Light Heavyweight (205 lb) (2012 – present); Middleweight (185 lb) (2018)
- Reach: 76 in (193 cm)
- Style: Brazilian Jiu-Jitsu, Sambo
- Fighting out of: Makhachkala, Dagestan, Russia; Coconut Creek, Florida, U.S.
- Team: Krepost; Gorets MMA; American Top Team
- Rank: National Master of Sports in Sambo; Brown belt in Brazilian Jiu-Jitsu
- Years active: 2012–present

Mixed martial arts record
- Total: 19
- Wins: 15
- By knockout: 5
- By submission: 5
- By decision: 5
- Losses: 4
- By knockout: 1
- By decision: 3

Other information
- Mixed martial arts record from Sherdog

Shamil Gamzatov (Russian: Шамиль Раджабович Гамзатов; born August 9, 1990) is a Russian mixed martial artist competing in the Light Heavyweight division. A professional since 2012, he has competed in the Ultimate Fighting Championship (UFC), World Series of Fighting, Absolute Championship Berkut and competed in the Middleweight division of the Professional Fighters League.

== Background ==
He was born in Kizlyar city, Dagestan, Soviet Union into a devout Sunni muslim family of Avar origin from Tsurib village, Charodinsky District. He started training in freestyle wrestling at 8 years of age, after an injured knee he retired. At 15 years of age he joined Amateur MMA under Zalimkhan Tatev. He won European and World MMA titles in amateur level. Also he is a Dagestan national kickboxing champion, 3x grappling Abu-Dhabi tournament winner. Combat Sambo North Caucasian championships 3rd 2015 at 100 kg. At the World Grappling Championships (World Grappling Association) he won the gold medal at 92 kilos.

Gamzatov said of his changing of sports as a kid, “[I] changed various sports and performed in them: combat sambo, grappling, amateur MMA. Then there was a transition to MMA and there was a debut and so began my career as a professional!”

== Mixed martial arts career ==
=== World Series of Fighting ===
Gamzatov made his debut in the US on January 23, 2016, at WSOF 27, his opponent was Teddy Holder of Tennessee. He won the fight by TKO (punches) in the first round.

=== Absolute Championship Berkut ===
Gamzatov faced Rodney Wallace on January 13, 2017, at ACB 51. He won the back-and-forth fight by split decision.

=== Professional Fighters League ===
Gamzatov faced Eddie Gordon on July 5, 2018, at PFL 3. He won the fight by unanimous decision.

In his next bout, Gamzatov faced Rex Harris on 16 August 2018 at PFL 6. He won the fight by unanimous decision.

=== Ultimate Fighting Championship ===
Gamzatov signed a four-fight deal with the UFC in July.

Gamzatov made his promotional debut against Klidson Abreu on November 9, 2019, at UFC Fight Night 163. He won the fight via split decision.

Gamzatov was scheduled to face Ovince Saint Preux on April 25, 2020. However, Gamzatov was forced to pull from the event due to COVID-19 pandemic travel restriction The match was rescheduled on August 22, 2020, at UFC on ESPN 15. However, for unknown reasons, Gamzatov was pulled from the bout and was replaced by Alonzo Menifield.

Gamzatov was briefly linked to a bout against Devin Clark on November 28, 2020, at UFC on ESPN: Blaydes vs. Lewis. However, Gamzatov was removed from the bout in mid-October due to alleged visa issues and was replaced by Anthony Smith on the card.

Gamzatov was scheduled to face Da Woon Jung on April 10, 2021, at UFC on ABC 2. However, Gamzatov was removed from the bout on March 24 due to alleged visa issues and was replaced by William Knight.

Gamzatov faced Michał Oleksiejczuk on October 30, 2021, at UFC 267. He lost the bout via TKO in the first round, losing for the first time in his professional career.

Gamzatov was scheduled to face Misha Cirkunov on August 6, 2022, at UFC on ESPN: Santos vs. Hill. However, Gamzatov was unable to obtain a US visa and the bout was scrapped, after which he and the UFC parted ways.

== Championships and accomplishments ==
=== Grappling ===
- Abu Dhabi grappling tournament
  - 3x tournament winner.
- World Grappling Association
  - World champion (92 kg).

=== MMA ===
- World Mixed Martial Arts Amateur Union
  - European champion 2013 (93 kg).
  - World champion 2013 (93 kg).

== Mixed martial arts record ==
Professional record breakdown
19 matches	15 wins	4 losses
By knockout	5	1
By submission	5	0
By decision	5	3

Res.	Record	Opponent	Method	Event	Date	Round	Time	Location	Notes
Loss	15–4	Ivan Shtyrkov	Decision (unanimous)	RCC 22	May 31, 2025	3	5:00	Yekaterinburg, Russia	
Win	15–3	Igor Glazkov	Decision (split)	RCC Intro 35	February 22, 2025	3	5:00	Yekaterinburg, Russia	Return to Light Heavyweight.
Loss	14–3	Asylzhan Bakhytzhanuly	Decision (unanimous)	Nashe Delo 86	December 6, 2024	3	5:00	Saint Petersburg, Russia	
Loss	14–2	Viktor Nemkov	Decision (unanimous)	Nashe Delo 84	June 12, 2024	5	5:00	Saint Petersburg, Russia	Return to Heavyweight. For the Nashe Delo Heavyweight Championship.
Loss	14–1	Michał Oleksiejczuk	TKO (punches)	UFC 267	October 30, 2021	1	3:31	Abu Dhabi, United Arab Emirates	
Win	14–0	Klidson Abreu	Decision (split)	UFC Fight Night: Magomedsharipov vs. Kattar	November 9, 2019	3	5:00	Moscow, Russia	Return to Light Heavyweight.
Win	13–0	Rex Harris	Decision (unanimous)	PFL 6 (2018)	August 16, 2018	3	5:00	Atlantic City, New Jersey, United States	
Win	12–0	Eddie Gordon	Decision (unanimous)	PFL 3 (2018)	July 5, 2018	3	5:00	Washington, D.C., United States	Middleweight debut.
Win	11–0	Rodney Wallace	Decision (split)	ACB 51	January 13, 2017	3	5:00	Irvine, California, United States	
Win	10–0	Teddy Holder	TKO (punches)	WSOF 27	January 23, 2016	1	2:32	Memphis, Tennessee, United States	
Win	9–0	Yuri Gorbenko	Submission (triangle choke)	N-1 Pro Nomad MMA: Asian Fighter 2014	October 5, 2014	1	3:39	Grozny, Russia	
Win	8–0	Sukhrob Muradov	TKO (punches)	Fight Star: Team Challenge 1	September 5, 2014	1	1:16	Saransk, Russia	
Win	7–0	Vladimir Mishchenko	Submission (guillotine choke)	Warriors Honor: Mayor's Cup	December 4, 2013	2	2:07	Kharkiv, Ukraine	
Win	6–0	Andrey Musanipov	Submission (armbar)	Universal Fighter: Fights of Champions 2	August 25, 2013	2	1:14	Ufa, Russia	
Win	5–0	Ivan Fedunov	KO (punch)	Versia Fighting Championship 1	August 17, 2013	1	3:52	Pyatigorsk, Russia	Return to Light Heavyweight.
Win	4–0	Ilya Gunenko	Submission (armbar)	WCSA Combat League: Combat Ring 3	June 30, 2013	1	2:14	Odesa, Ukraine	Heavyweight debut.
Win	3–0	Rustam Omar-Ogly	Submission (armbar)	Derbent FC 3	July 13, 2012	1	3:40	Derbent, Russia	
Win	2–0	Assaad Raad	TKO (punches)	Top Fight: Battle of the Gyms	February 25, 2012	2	2:35	Dubai, United Arab Emirates	
Win	1–0	Murat Aibazov	TKO (punches)	Pankration Cup of Teberda 2012	January 30, 2012	2	1:35	Teberda, Russia	Light Heavyweight debut.

== See also ==
- List of male mixed martial artists
