= 2018 in Professional Fighters League =

- Genre: Sports
- Country of origin: United States

Original release
- Network: ESPN
- Release: June 7 – December 31, 2018

This is a list of events and standings for the Professional Fighters League, a mixed martial arts organization based in the United States, for the 2018 season.

Each weight class had 12 fighters, each of which faced two rivals. The top eight fighters in each weight class qualified to the playoffs. The season concluded on December 31, 2018 with six championship bouts back-to-back with a $10 million prize pool.

== 2018 world champions ==
Division	Upper weight limit	Champion	Date
Heavyweight	265 lb (120 kg; 18.9 st)	Philipe Lins	December 31, 2018 (PFL 11)
Light Heavyweight	205 lb (93 kg; 14.6 st)	Sean O'Connell	December 31, 2018 (PFL 11)
Middleweight	185 lb (84 kg; 13.2 st)	Louis Taylor	December 31, 2018 (PFL 11)
Welterweight	170 lb (77 kg; 12 st)	Magomed Magomedkerimov	December 31, 2018 (PFL 11)
Lightweight	155 lb (70 kg; 11.1 st)	Natan Schulte	December 31, 2018 (PFL 11)
Featherweight	145 lb (66 kg; 10.5 st)	Lance Palmer	December 31, 2018 (PFL 11)

== Events ==
#	Event	Date	Venue	Location
11	PFL 11	December 31, 2018	Hulu Theater at Madison Square Garden	New York City, New York, U.S.
10	PFL 10	October 20, 2018	St. Elizabeths East Entertainment and Sports Arena	Washington, D.C., U.S.
9	PFL 9	October 13, 2018	Long Beach Convention and Entertainment Center	Long Beach, California, U.S.
8	PFL 8	October 5, 2018	Ernest N. Morial Convention Center	New Orleans, Louisiana, U.S.
7	PFL 7	August 30, 2018	Ocean Resort Casino	Atlantic City, New Jersey, U.S.
6	PFL 6	August 16, 2018	Ocean Resort Casino	Atlantic City, New Jersey, U.S.
5	PFL 5	August 2, 2018	Nassau Coliseum	Uniondale, New York, U.S.
4	PFL 4	July 19, 2018	Nassau Coliseum	Uniondale, New York, U.S.
3	PFL 3	July 5, 2018	Charles E. Smith Center	Washington, D.C., U.S.
2	PFL 2	June 21, 2018	Chicago Theater	Chicago, Illinois, U.S.
1	PFL 1	June 7, 2018	Hulu Theater at Madison Square Garden	New York City, New York, U.S.

== 2018 PFL Heavyweight playoffs ==
Quarter-finals
(Brazil) Francimar Barroso (1)	L
(United States) Josh Copeland (8)	Draw 2
(United States) Jack May (4)	L
(United States) Alex Nicholson (5)	TKO 1
(Brazil) Philipe Lins (3)	SUB 1
(Brazil) Caio Alencar* (9)	L
(United States) Kelvin Tiller (2)	L
(United States) Jared Rosholt (7)	UD 2

Semi-finals
(United States) Josh Copeland (8)	KO 1
(United States) Alex Nicholson (5)	L
(Brazil) Philipe Lins (3)	TKO 2
(United States) Jared Rosholt (7)	L

Final
(United States) Josh Copeland (8)	L
(Brazil) Philipe Lins (3)	TKO 4

* Valdrin Istrefi was originally scheduled to face Philipe Lins but was forced to pull out of the bout. He was replaced by Caio Alencar.

Legend
(SD)	(Split Decision)
(UD)	(Unanimous Decision)
(MD)	(Majority Decision)
SUB	Submission
(T)KO	(Technical) Knock Out
L	Loss

== 2018 PFL Light Heavyweight playoffs ==
Quarter-finals
(Brazil) Vinny Magalhães (1)	SUB 1
(United States) Rakim Cleveland (8)	L
(Russia) Bazigit Atajev (4)	TKO 1
(Argentina) Emiliano Sordi (5)	L
(United States) Sean O'Connell (3)	MD 2
(United States) Dan Spohn (6)	L
(Russia) Maxim Grishin (2)	L
(Canada) Smealinho Rama (7)	Draw 2

Semi-finals
(Brazil) Vinny Magalhães (1)	SUB 1
(Russia) Bazigit Atajev (4)	L
(United States) Sean O'Connell (3)	KO 1
(Canada) Smealinho Rama (7)	L

Final
(Brazil) Vinny Magalhães (1)	L
(United States) Sean O'Connell (3)	TKO 3

Legend
(SD)	(Split Decision)
(UD)	(Unanimous Decision)
(MD)	(Majority Decision)
SUB	Submission
(T)KO	(Technical) Knock Out
L	Loss

== 2018 PFL Middleweight playoffs ==
Quarter-finals
(Germany) Abuspiyan Magomedov (1)	Draw 2
(Russia) Gasan Umalatov (8)	L
(Brazil) Bruno Santos (4)
(Sweden) Sadibou Sy (5)	Draw 2
(Jamaica) Eddie Gordon* (11)	L
(United States) John Howard (6)	UD 2
(United States) Louis Taylor (2)	UD 2
(United States) Rex Harris (7)	L

Semi-finals
(Germany) Abuspiyan Magomedov (1)	UD 3
(Sweden) Sadibou Sy (5)	L
(United States) John Howard (6)	L
(United States) Louis Taylor (2)	Draw 3

Final
(Germany) Abuspiyan Magomedov (1)	L
(United States) Louis Taylor (2)	KO 1

* Shamil Gamzatov was originally scheduled to face John Howard but was forced to pull out of the bout. He was replaced by Eddie Gordon.

Legend
(SD)	(Split Decision)
(UD)	(Unanimous Decision)
(MD)	(Majority Decision)
SUB	Submission
(T)KO	(Technical) Knock Out
L	Loss

== 2018 PFL Welterweight playoffs ==
Quarter-finals
(United States) Ray Cooper III (1)	TKO 1
(United States) Jake Shields (8)	L
(United States) Rick Story (4)	L
(Brazil) Handesson Ferreira (5)	TKO 2
(Russia) Magomed Magomedkerimov (3)	UD 2
(Ukraine) Pavlo Kusch (6)	L
(Russia) Abubakar Nurmagomedov* (9)	Draw 2*
(Serbia) Bojan Veličković (7)	L

Semi-finals
(United States) Ray Cooper III (1)	TKO 1
(Brazil) Handesson Ferreira (5)	L
(Russia) Magomed Magomedkerimov (3)	TKO 2
(Serbia) Bojan Veličković (7)	L

Final
(United States) Ray Cooper III (1)	L
(Russia) Magomed Magomedkerimov (3)	SUB 1

* João Zeferino was originally scheduled to face Bojan Veličković but was forced to pull out of the bout. He was replaced by Abubakar Nurmagomedov.

* Abubakar Nurmagomedov was originally scheduled to face Magomed Magomedkerimov but was unable to continue in the tournament. He was replaced by his quarterfinal opponent, Bojan Veličković.

Legend
(SD)	(Split Decision)
(UD)	(Unanimous Decision)
(MD)	(Majority Decision)
SUB	Submission
(T)KO	(Technical) Knock Out
L	Loss

== 2018 PFL Lightweight playoffs ==
Quarter-finals
(Brazil) Natan Schulte (1)	Draw 2
(United States) Johnny Case (8)	L
(United States) Chris Wade (4)	MD 2
(United States) Robert Watley (5)	L
(Russia) Islam Mamedov (3)	UD 2
(Brazil) Thiago Tavares (6)	L
(United States) Will Brooks (2)	L
(Russia) Rashid Magomedov (7)	Draw 2

Semi-finals
(Brazil) Natan Schulte (1)	SD 3
(United States) Chris Wade (4)	L
(Brazil) Thiago Tavares (6)	L
(Russia) Rashid Magomedov (7)	TKO 2

Final
(Brazil) Natan Schulte (1)	UD 5
(Russia) Rashid Magomedov (7)	L

* Islam Mamedov was originally scheduled to face Rashid Magomedov but was unable to continue in the tournament. He was replaced by his quarterfinal opponent, Thiago Tavares.

Legend
(SD)	(Split Decision)
(UD)	(Unanimous Decision)
(MD)	(Majority Decision)
SUB	Submission
(T)KO	(Technical) Knock Out
L	Loss

== 2018 PFL Featherweight playoffs ==
Quarter-finals
(United States) Steven Siler (1)	Draw 2
(Argentina) Nazareno Malegarie (8)	L
(China) Jumabieke Tuerxun* (11)	L
(Brazil) Alexandre Almeida (5)	MD 2
(United States) Andre Harrison (3)	MD 2
(Brazil) Alexandre Bezerra (6)	L
(United States) Lance Palmer (2)	UD 2
(Germany) Max Coga (7)	L

Semi-finals
(United States) Steven Siler (1)	DQ 2
(Brazil) Alexandre Almeida (5)	L
(United States) Andre Harrison (3)	L
(United States) Lance Palmer (2)	UD 3

Final
(United States) Steven Siler (1)	L
(United States) Lance Palmer (2)	UD 5

* Timur Valiev was originally scheduled to face Alexandre Almeida but was forced to pull out of the bout. He was replaced by Jumabieke Tuerxun.

Legend
(SD)	(Split Decision)
(UD)	(Unanimous Decision)
(MD)	(Majority Decision)
SUB	Submission
(T)KO	(Technical) Knock Out
L	Loss

== Standings ==
The point system consists of outcome based scoring and bonuses for an early win. Under the outcome based scoring system, the winner of a fight receives 3 points and the loser receives 0 points. If the fight ends in a draw, both fighters will receive 1 point. The bonus for winning a fight in the first, second, or third round is 3 points, 2 points, and 1 point respectively. For example, if a fighter wins a fight in the first round, then the fighter will receive 6 total points. If a fighter misses weight, then the fighter that missed weight will receive 0 points and his opponent will receive 3 points due to a walkover victory.

=== Featherweight ===
Fighter	Wins	Draws	Losses	1st	2nd	3rd	Total Points (Note: The eight fighters with most points (green background) advance to the playoffs)
♛ Steven Siler	2	0	0	2	0	0	12
♛ Lance Palmer	2	0	0	0	1	1	9
♛ Andre Harrison	2	0	0	0	0	0	6
🚫 Timur Valiev	2	0	0	0	0	0	6
♛ Alexandre Almeida	1	0	1	1	0	0	6
♛ Alexandre Bezerra	1	0	0	1	0	0	6
♛ Max Coga	1	0	1	0	0	1	4
♛ Nazareno Malegarie	1	0	1	0	0	0	3
E Magomed Idrisov	0	0	2	0	0	0	0
E Lee Coville	0	0	1	0	0	0	0
♛ Jumabieke Tuerxun	0	0	2	0	0	0	0
E Marcos Galvão	0	0	2	0	0	0	0
E Bekbulat Magomedov	0	0	2	0	0	0	0

=== Lightweight ===
Fighter	Wins	Draws	Losses	1st	2nd	3rd	Total Points (Note: The eight fighters with most points (green background) advance to the playoffs)
♛ Natan Schulte	2	0	0	1	0	0	9
♛ Will Brooks	2	0	0	0	0	0	6
♛ Islam Mamedov	2	0	0	0	0	0	6
♛ Chris Wade	1	0	1	0	0	0	6
♛ Robert Watley	1	0	1	0	1	0	5
♛ Thiago Tavares	1	0	1	0	0	0	3
♛ Rashid Magomedov	1	0	0	0	0	0	3
♛ Johnny Case	1	0	0	0	0	0	3
E Efrain Escudero	1*	0	1	0	0	1	0
E Arthur Estrázulas	0	0	1	0	0	0	0
E Luiz Firmino	0	0	2	0	0	0	0
E Jason High	0	0	3*	0	0	0	3
E Yuki Kawana	0	0	2	0	0	0	0
🚫	0	0	0	0	1	4	
🚫 Ramsey Nijem	0	0	1	0	0	0	0

- Although Efrain Escudero won his fight against Jason High, PFL MMA rules state a fighter who misses the weight limit forfeits all points from the match, and the opponent earns a walkover win.

=== Welterweight ===
Fighter	Wins	Draws	Losses	1st	2nd	3rd	Total Points (Note: The eight fighters with most points (green background) advance to the playoffs)
♛ Ray Cooper III	2	0	0	1	1	0	11
♛ João Zeferino	2	0	0	1	0	1	10
♛ Magomed Magomedkerimov	2	0	0	1	0	0	9
♛ Rick Story	2	0	0	0	1	0	8
♛ Handesson Ferreira	1	0	0	1	0	0	6
♛ Pavlo Kusch	1	0	1	0	1	0	5
♛ Bojan Veličković	1	0	1	0	1	0	5
♛ Jake Shields	1	0	1	0	0	0	3
E Abubakar Nurmagomedov	1	0	1	0	0	0	3
E Paul Bradley	0	0	1	0	0	0	0
E Yuri Villefort	0	0	2	0	0	0	0
E Jonatan Westin	0	0	2	0	0	0	0
E Herman Terrado	0	0	2	0	0	0	0
E Carlton Minus	0	0	1	0	0	0	0

=== Middleweight ===
Fighter	Wins	Draws	Losses	1st	2nd	3rd	Total Points (Note: The eight fighters with most points (green background) advance to the playoffs)
♛ Abuspiyan Magomedov	2	0	0	2	0	0	12
♛ Louis Taylor	2	0	0	0	0	1	7
♛ Shamil Gamzatov	2	0	0	0	0	0	6
♛ Bruno Santos	2	0	0	0	0	0	6
♛ Sadibou Sy	1	0	1	1	0	0	6
♛ John Howard	1	0	1	0	1	0	5
♛ Rex Harris	1	0	1	0	0	0	3
♛ Gasan Umalatov	1	0	1	0	0	0	3
E Caio Magalhães	0	0	1	0	0	0	0
E Anderson Gonçalves	0	0	2	0	0	0	0
E Eddie Gordon	0	0	2	0	0	0	0
E Andre Lobato	0	0	2	0	0	0	0

=== Light Heavyweight ===
Fighter	Wins	Draws	Losses	1st	2nd	3rd	Total Points (Note: The eight fighters with most points (green background) advance to the playoffs)
♛ Vinny Magalhães	2	0	0	2	0	0	12
♛ Maxim Grishin	2	0	0	1	1	0	11
♛ Dan Spohn	2	0	0	0	0	1	7
♛ Emiliano Sordi	1	0	0	1	0	0	6
♛ Bazigit Atajev	1	0	1	1	0	0	6
♛ Sean O'Connell	1	0	0	0	1	0	5
♛ Smealinho Rama	1	0	1	0	1	0	4
♛ Rakim Cleveland	1	0	1	0	0	1	4
E Brandon Halsey	1	0	1	0	0	1	4
🚫 Rashid Yusupov	0	0	1	0	0	0	0
🚫 Ronny Markes	0	0	1	0	0	0	0
E Jamie Abdallah	0	0	1	0	0	0	0
E Jason Butcher	0	0	2	0	0	0	0
E Artur Alibulatov	0	0	1	0	0	0	0

=== Heavyweight ===
Fighter	Wins	Draws	Losses	1st	2nd	3rd	Total Points (Note: The eight fighters with most points (green background) advance to the playoffs)
♛ (Brazil) Francimar Barroso	2	0	0	2	0	0	12
♛ (United States) Kelvin Tiller	2	0	0	1	1	0	11
♛ (Brazil) Philipe Lins	2	0	0	0	1	0	8
♛ (United States) Jack May	1	0	1	1	0	0	6
♛ (United States) Alex Nicholson	1	0	1	0	1	0	5
🚫 (Liechtenstein) Valdrin Istrefi	1	0	1	0	1	0	5
♛ (United States) Jared Rosholt	1	0	1	0	0	0	3
♛ (United States) Josh Copeland	1	0	1	0	0	0	3
♛ (Brazil) Caio Alencar	1	0	1	0	0	0	3
E (United States) Mike Kyle	0	0	0	0	0	0	0
E (United States) Daniel Gallemore	0	0	2	0	0	0	0
E (United States) Jake Heun	0	0	1	0	0	0	0
E (United States) Shawn Jordan	0	0	2	0	0	0	0

♛ = Clinched playoff spot --- 🚫 = Ruled out --- E = Eliminated

NOTE: Prior to PFL 8, which started the PFL playoff, Valdrin Istrefi was ruled out because of an injury. Caio Alencar was declared the first alternate and participated in the playoff.

== See also ==
- List of PFL events
- List of current PFL fighters
