= PFL 11 (2018) =

Professional Fighters League MMA event in 2018

- Promotion: Professional Fighters League
- Date: December 31, 2018
- Venue: Hulu Theater at Madison Square Garden
- City: New York City, New York, U.S.

Event chronology
PFL 10	PFL 11	PFL 1

The PFL 11 mixed martial arts event for the 2018 season of the Professional Fighters League, the PFL 2018 Championship, was held on December 31, 2018, at the Hulu Theater at Madison Square Garden in New York City, New York.

== Background ==
The event was the eleventh and final event of the 2018 season. Each champion in the six weight classes was crowned and won a championship prize of $1 million each.

== Results ==
Main Card
Weight class				Method	Round	Time	Notes
Welterweight	Magomed Magomedkerimov	def.	Ray Cooper III	Submission (guillotine choke)	2	2:43	(Note: For the 2018 PFL Welterweight Championship.)
Heavyweight	Philipe Lins	def.	Josh Copeland	TKO (knees and punches)	4	0:30	(Note: For the 2018 PFL Heavyweight Championship.)
Light Heavyweight	Sean O'Connell	def.	Vinny Magalhães	TKO (corner stoppage)	3	5:00	(Note: For the 2018 PFL Light Heavyweight Championship.)
Women's Lightweight	Kayla Harrison	def.	Moriel Charneski	TKO (punches)	1	3:39
Lightweight	Natan Schulte	def.	Rashid Magomedov	Decision (unanimous) (48-46, 48-46, 48-46)	5	5:00	(Note: For the 2018 PFL Lightweight Championship.)
Featherweight	Lance Palmer	def.	Steven Siler	Decision (unanimous) (50-43, 50-45, 49-46)	5	5:00	(Note: For the 2018 PFL Featherweight Championship.)
Middleweight	Louis Taylor	def.	Abusupiyan Magomedov	KO (punch)	1	0:33	(Note: For the 2018 PFL Middleweight Championship.)

== 2018 PFL Heavyweight playoffs ==
Quarter-finals
(Brazil) Francimar Barroso (1)	L
(United States) Josh Copeland (8)	Draw 2
(United States) Jack May (4)	L
(United States) Alex Nicholson (5)	TKO 1
(Brazil) Philipe Lins (3)	SUB 1
(Brazil) Caio Alencar* (9)	L
(United States) Kelvin Tiller (2)	L
(United States) Jared Rosholt (7)	UD 2

Semi-finals
(United States) Josh Copeland (8)	KO 1
(United States) Alex Nicholson (5)	L
(Brazil) Philipe Lins (3)	TKO 2
(United States) Jared Rosholt (7)	L

Final
(United States) Josh Copeland (8)	L
(Brazil) Philipe Lins (3)	TKO 4

* Valdrin Istrefi was originally scheduled to face Philipe Lins but was forced to pull out of the bout. He was replaced by Caio Alencar.

Legend
(SD)	(Split Decision)
(UD)	(Unanimous Decision)
(MD)	(Majority Decision)
SUB	Submission
(T)KO	(Technical) Knock Out
L	Loss

== 2018 PFL Light Heavyweight playoffs ==
Quarter-finals
(Brazil) Vinny Magalhães (1)	SUB 1
(United States) Rakim Cleveland (8)	L
(Russia) Bazigit Atajev (4)	TKO 1
(Argentina) Emiliano Sordi (5)	L
(United States) Sean O'Connell (3)	MD 2
(United States) Dan Spohn (6)	L
(Russia) Maxim Grishin (2)	L
(Canada) Smealinho Rama (7)	Draw 2

Semi-finals
(Brazil) Vinny Magalhães (1)	SUB 1
(Russia) Bazigit Atajev (4)	L
(United States) Sean O'Connell (3)	KO 1
(Canada) Smealinho Rama (7)	L

Final
(Brazil) Vinny Magalhães (1)	L
(United States) Sean O'Connell (3)	TKO 3

Legend
(SD)	(Split Decision)
(UD)	(Unanimous Decision)
(MD)	(Majority Decision)
SUB	Submission
(T)KO	(Technical) Knock Out
L	Loss

== 2018 PFL Middleweight playoffs ==
Quarter-finals
(Germany) Abuspiyan Magomedov (1)	Draw 2
(Russia) Gasan Umalatov (8)	L
(Brazil) Bruno Santos (4)
(Sweden) Sadibou Sy (5)	Draw 2
(Jamaica) Eddie Gordon* (11)	L
(United States) John Howard (6)	UD 2
(United States) Louis Taylor (2)	UD 2
(United States) Rex Harris (7)	L

Semi-finals
(Germany) Abuspiyan Magomedov (1)	UD 3
(Sweden) Sadibou Sy (5)	L
(United States) John Howard (6)	L
(United States) Louis Taylor (2)	Draw 3

Final
(Germany) Abuspiyan Magomedov (1)	L
(United States) Louis Taylor (2)	KO 1

* Shamil Gamzatov was originally scheduled to face John Howard but was forced to pull out of the bout. He was replaced by Eddie Gordon.

Legend
(SD)	(Split Decision)
(UD)	(Unanimous Decision)
(MD)	(Majority Decision)
SUB	Submission
(T)KO	(Technical) Knock Out
L	Loss

== 2018 PFL Welterweight playoffs ==
Quarter-finals
(United States) Ray Cooper III (1)	TKO 1
(United States) Jake Shields (8)	L
(United States) Rick Story (4)	L
(Brazil) Handesson Ferreira (5)	TKO 2
(Russia) Magomed Magomedkerimov (3)	UD 2
(Ukraine) Pavlo Kusch (6)	L
(Russia) Abubakar Nurmagomedov* (9)	Draw 2*
(Serbia) Bojan Veličković (7)	L

Semi-finals
(United States) Ray Cooper III (1)	TKO 1
(Brazil) Handesson Ferreira (5)	L
(Russia) Magomed Magomedkerimov (3)	TKO 2
(Serbia) Bojan Veličković (7)	L

Final
(United States) Ray Cooper III (1)	L
(Russia) Magomed Magomedkerimov (3)	SUB 1

* João Zeferino was originally scheduled to face Bojan Veličković but was forced to pull out of the bout. He was replaced by Abubakar Nurmagomedov.

* Abubakar Nurmagomedov was originally scheduled to face Magomed Magomedkerimov but was unable to continue in the tournament. He was replaced by his quarterfinal opponent, Bojan Veličković.

Legend
(SD)	(Split Decision)
(UD)	(Unanimous Decision)
(MD)	(Majority Decision)
SUB	Submission
(T)KO	(Technical) Knock Out
L	Loss

== 2018 PFL Lightweight playoffs ==
Quarter-finals
(Brazil) Natan Schulte (1)	Draw 2
(United States) Johnny Case (8)	L
(United States) Chris Wade (4)	MD 2
(United States) Robert Watley (5)	L
(Russia) Islam Mamedov (3)	UD 2
(Brazil) Thiago Tavares (6)	L
(United States) Will Brooks (2)	L
(Russia) Rashid Magomedov (7)	Draw 2

Semi-finals
(Brazil) Natan Schulte (1)	SD 3
(United States) Chris Wade (4)	L
(Brazil) Thiago Tavares (6)	L
(Russia) Rashid Magomedov (7)	TKO 2

Final
(Brazil) Natan Schulte (1)	UD 5
(Russia) Rashid Magomedov (7)	L

* Islam Mamedov was originally scheduled to face Rashid Magomedov but was unable to continue in the tournament. He was replaced by his quarterfinal opponent, Thiago Tavares.

Legend
(SD)	(Split Decision)
(UD)	(Unanimous Decision)
(MD)	(Majority Decision)
SUB	Submission
(T)KO	(Technical) Knock Out
L	Loss

== 2018 PFL Featherweight playoffs ==
Quarter-finals
(United States) Steven Siler (1)	Draw 2
(Argentina) Nazareno Malegarie (8)	L
(China) Jumabieke Tuerxun* (11)	L
(Brazil) Alexandre Almeida (5)	MD 2
(United States) Andre Harrison (3)	MD 2
(Brazil) Alexandre Bezerra (6)	L
(United States) Lance Palmer (2)	UD 2
(Germany) Max Coga (7)	L

Semi-finals
(United States) Steven Siler (1)	DQ 2
(Brazil) Alexandre Almeida (5)	L
(United States) Andre Harrison (3)	L
(United States) Lance Palmer (2)	UD 3

Final
(United States) Steven Siler (1)	L
(United States) Lance Palmer (2)	UD 5

* Timur Valiev was originally scheduled to face Alexandre Almeida but was forced to pull out of the bout. He was replaced by Jumabieke Tuerxun.

Legend
(SD)	(Split Decision)
(UD)	(Unanimous Decision)
(MD)	(Majority Decision)
SUB	Submission
(T)KO	(Technical) Knock Out
L	Loss

== See also ==
- List of PFL events
- List of current PFL fighters
