= Steven Siler =

American mixed martial arts fighter

- Born: February 15, 1987 (age 39); Anaheim, California, United States
- Other names: Super
- Height: 5 ft 10 in (1.78 m)
- Weight: 145 lb (66 kg; 10.4 st)
- Division: Lightweight; Featherweight
- Reach: 70.0 in (178 cm)
- Fighting out of: Orem, Utah, United States
- Team: Absolute MMA; MMA Lab; The Pit Elevated Fight Team
- Years active: 2005–present

Mixed martial arts record
- Total: 60
- Wins: 33
- By knockout: 6
- By submission: 18
- By decision: 8
- By disqualification: 1
- Losses: 26
- By knockout: 6
- By submission: 7
- By decision: 13
- Draws: 1

Other information
- Mixed martial arts record from Sherdog

Steven Siler (born February 15, 1987) is an American mixed martial artist currently competing in the Featherweight division of the Professional Fighters League. A professional competitor since 2005, he has competed for the UFC, Titan FC, Tachi Palace Fights, and was a competitor on Spike TV's The Ultimate Fighter: Team Bisping vs. Team Miller.

== Background ==
Born in Anaheim, Siler moved to Utah from a young age alongside his father Michael Siler Sr., mother Cathy Siler, brother Michael Siler Jr and sister Tara Siler. Siler was unable to compete in wrestling during high school due to poor grades, but made the move to MMA after graduating.

== Mixed martial arts career ==
Siler had a nine-fight winning streak with wins over Bellator veterans, Travis Marx and Nick Mamalis. Siler then accepted a bout with future UFC featherweight title challenger, Chad Mendes, at Tachi Palace Fights: Best of Both Worlds. Siler lost the fight inside the first minute of round one via KO.

Siler returned Throwdown MMA, claiming the featherweight title after beating Enoch Wilson. Siler won three more fights after winning the Throwdown title before challenging Cole Escovedo at Showdown Fights: New Blood. Siler lost the fight via submission (triangle choke) in the first round.

=== The Ultimate Fighter ===
In 2011, Siler signed to compete on The Ultimate Fighter: Team Bisping vs. Team Miller. In the first episode, Siler gained entry into the house after defeating Micah Miller via submission at 0:53 of the third round. Siler was picked to be part of Team Miller. In the sixth episode, he did not make the semi-finals, as he lost to Diego Brandao via KO due to a flying knee 30 seconds into the first round.

=== Ultimate Fighting Championship ===
Despite being eliminated from the TUF season, Siler was signed to a contract with the UFC. Siler was originally scheduled to fight Akira Corassani on December 3, 2011, at The Ultimate Fighter 14 Finale. However, Corassani was forced out with an injury and replaced by Josh Clopton. Siler defeated Clopton via unanimous decision.

Siler next faced Cole Miller at UFC on FX 2 on March 2, 2012. Siler won the fight via unanimous decision (29–28, 29–28, 29–28).

Siler was expected to face Jimy Hettes at UFC on FX 4. However, Hettes was forced out of the bout with an injury and Siler instead faced UFC newcomer Joey Gambino. He won the fight via submission in the first round.

Siler lost a unanimous decision to Darren Elkins on November 17, 2012, at UFC 154.

Siler was again expected to face Jimy Hettes on April 27, 2013, at UFC 159. However, Hettes was once again forced out of the bout with an injury and replaced by Kurt Holobaugh. Siler won the back-and-forth bout via unanimous decision.

Replacing Akira Corassani on short notice, Siler faced Mike Brown on August 17, 2013, at UFC Fight Night 26. He won the fight via knockout just 50 seconds into the first round.

Siler faced Dennis Bermudez on November 6, 2013, at UFC Fight Night 31. He lost the fight via unanimous decision.

Siler faced Rony Jason on March 23, 2014, at UFC Fight Night 38. He lost the fight via a controversial TKO stoppage in the first round. Siler was initially dropped by two punches from Jason. Siler, having his back on the mat, immediately throw an up-kick as soon as Rony proceeded to walk toward him. At the very same time the referee stepped in to stop the fight as a conscious Siler was attempting to defend himself.

Siler faced Noad Lahat on July 26, 2014, at UFC on Fox 12. He lost the fight via unanimous decision, and was subsequently released from the promotions shortly after.

=== Titan Fighting Championship ===
In October 2014, it was announced that Siler had signed a contract with Titan Fighting Championship. After Desmond Green knocked out Miguel Torres, it was announced that Siler would face Green for the vacant Featherweight championship. The fight took place at Titan FC 32 on December 19, 2014 and Siler lost via unanimous decision.

=== Professional Fighters League ===
After fighting in the WSOF, Siler faced Lance Palmer at what was the inaugural event of rebranded organization now known as Professional Fighters League on November 2, 2017. He lost the fight via unanimous decision.

==== 2018 season ====
On April 16, 2018, news surfaced that Siler was set to participate in the inaugural season of Professional Fighters League's featherweight tournament. Simultaneously it was announced that Siler would be facing Magomed Idrisov at PFL 1 on June 7, 2018. After being knocked down, Siler won the fight via first-round submission.

Siler then faced Alexandre Almeida at PFL 4 on July 19, 2018. He won the fight via first-minute submission and advanced to playoffs.

In the quarterfinal, Siler faced Nazareno Malegarie at PFL 8 on October 5, 2018. The bout resulted in a majority draw and Siler advanced to the semifinal via first-round tiebreaker. In the semifinals he faced Alexandre Almeida again, this time winning via disqualification after an illegal upkick performed by Almeida.

In the season final Siler faced Lance Palmer in a rematch at PFL 11 on December 31, 2018. He lost the fight via unanimous decision.

==== 2019 season ====
On March 5, 2019, it was announced that Siler would be returning to participate in the sophomore season of PFL. He made his first appearance of the season against Gadzhi Rabadanov at PFL 2 on May 23, 2019. He lost the fight via unanimous decision.

He then faced Jeremy Kennedy at PFL 5 on July 25, 2019. He lost the fight via unanimous decision and was eliminated from the tournament.

=== Post-PFL career ===
After two seasons in the PFL, Siler challenged Bobby King for the Fierce FC Lightweight Championship on February 27, 2021. He lost the fight via fourth-round submission.

Siler faced Will Brooks on July 30, 2021 at XMMA 2. He lost the bout via unanimous decision.

After defeating Carson Hardman at Fierce FC 16 on August 28, 2021 via first-round submission and then losing to Zach Zane at Fierce FC 17 on October 29, 2021 via seven-second knockout. Siler next faced Jakob Scheffel at Showtime FC 1 on February 11, 2022, where he lost the fight via unanimous decision.

Siler would return in April 2022, losing to Tsogookhuu Amarsanaa via unanimous decision, before losing once again against Micah Miller via second round triangle armbar on December 2, 2022 at iKON FC 6.

== Championships and accomplishments ==
- Ultimate Fighting Championship
  - UFC.com Awards
    - 2012: Ranked #10 Upset of the Year vs. Cole Miller

== Mixed martial arts record ==
Professional record breakdown
60 matches	33 wins	26 losses
By knockout	6	6
By submission	18	7
By decision	8	13
By disqualification	1	0
Draws	1	

Res.	Record	Opponent	Method	Event	Date	Round	Time	Location	Notes
Loss	33–26–1	Micah Miller	Submission (triangle armbar)	iKON FC 6	December 2, 2022	2	1:47	Kissimmee, Florida, United States	
Loss	33–25–1	Tsogookhuu Amarsanaa	Decision (unanimous)	Fierce FC 19	April 30, 2022	3	5:00	West Valley City, Utah, United States	Catchweight (165 lb) bout.
Loss	33–24–1	Jakob Scheffel	Decision (unanimous)	Showtime FC 1	February 11, 2022	3	5:00	Lakeland, Florida, United States	Welterweight debut.
Loss	33–23–1	Zach Zane	TKO (strikes)	Fierce FC 17: Siler vs. Zane	October 29, 2021	1	0:07	Salt Lake City, Utah, United States	Catchweight (165 lbs) bout.
Win	33–22–1	Carson Hardman	Submission (rear-naked choke)	Fierce FC 16: Siler vs. Hardman	August 28, 2021	1	4:37	Salt Lake City, Utah, United States	
Loss	32–22–1	Will Brooks	Decision (unanimous)	XMMA 2: Saunders vs. Nijem	July 30, 2021	3	5:00	Greenville, South Carolina, United States	
Loss	32–21–1	Bobby King	Submission (armbar)	Fierce FC: Will Power	February 27, 2021	4	0:57	West Valley City, Utah, United States	For the Fierce FC Lightweight Championship.
Loss	32–20–1	Jeremy Kennedy	Decision (unanimous)	PFL 5	July 25, 2019	3	5:00	Atlantic City, New Jersey, United States	2019 PFL Featherweight Second Round.
Loss	32–19–1	Gadzhi Rabadanov	Decision (unanimous)	PFL 2	May 23, 2019	3	5:00	Uniondale, New York, United States	2019 PFL Featherweight Opening Round.
Loss	32–18–1	Lance Palmer	Decision (unanimous)	PFL 11	December 31, 2018	5	5:00	New York City, New York, United States	For the 2018 PFL Featherweight Championship.
Win	32–17–1	Alexandre Almeida	DQ (illegal upkick)	PFL 8	October 5, 2018	2	0:52	New Orleans, Louisiana, United States	2018 PFL Featherweight Semifinal bout.
Draw	31–17–1	Nazareno Malegarie	Draw (majority)	PFL 8	October 5, 2018	2	5:00	New Orleans, Louisiana, United States	2018 PFL Featherweight Quarterfinal bout. Advanced via first round tiebreaker.
Win	31–17	Alexandre Almeida	Technical submission (guillotine choke)	PFL 4	July 19, 2018	1	0:35	Uniondale, New York, United States	
Win	30–17	Magomed Idrisov	Submission (triangle choke)	PFL 1	June 7, 2018	1	4:19	New York City, New York, United States	
Loss	29–17	Lance Palmer	Decision (unanimous)	PFL: Fight Night	November 2, 2017	3	5:00	Washington, D.C., United States	
Loss	29–16	Hakeem Dawodu	Decision (unanimous)	WSOF 35	March 18, 2017	3	5:00	Verona, New York, United States	
Win	29–15	Patrick Reeves	KO	Jeremy Horn's Elite Fight Night 28	August 16, 2016	1	0:13	Ogden, Utah, United States	
Loss	28–15	Andre Harrison	Decision (split)	Titan FC 37	March 4, 2016	5	5:00	Ridgefield, Washington, United States	For the Titan FC Featherweight Championship.
Win	28–14	Scott Thometz	Decision (unanimous)	Front Street Fights 7	November 13, 2015	3	5:00	Boise, Idaho, United States	
Win	27–14	Austin Springer	Submission (guillotine choke)	Titan FC 35	September 19, 2015	1	1:04	Ridgefield, Washington, United States	Return to Featherweight.
Win	26–14	Joshua Tyler	Submission (rear-naked choke)	Jeremy Horn's Elite Fight Night 27	August 7, 2015	1	3:05	Ogden, Utah, United States	
Win	25–14	Jack Montgomery	TKO (punches)	World Fighting Championships 41	June 22, 2015	1	2:32	Reno, Nevada, United States	Lightweight debut.
Win	24–14	Brandon Hempleman	TKO (punches)	Front Street Fights 4	February 20, 2015	1	2:45	Boise, Idaho, United States	
Loss	23–14	Desmond Green	Decision (unanimous)	Titan FC 32	December 19, 2014	5	5:00	Lowell, Massachusetts, United States	For the inaugural Titan FC Featherweight Championship.
Loss	23–13	Noad Lahat	Decision (unanimous)	UFC on Fox: Lawler vs. Brown	July 26, 2014	3	5:00	San Jose, California, United States	
Loss	23–12	Rony Jason	TKO (punches)	UFC Fight Night: Shogun vs. Henderson 2	March 23, 2014	1	1:17	Natal, Brazil	
Loss	23–11	Dennis Bermudez	Decision (unanimous)	UFC: Fight for the Troops 3	November 6, 2013	3	5:00	Fort Campbell, Kentucky, United States	
Win	23–10	Mike Brown	KO (punches)	UFC Fight Night: Shogun vs. Sonnen	August 17, 2013	1	0:50	Boston, Massachusetts, United States	
Win	22–10	Kurt Holobaugh	Decision (unanimous)	UFC 159	April 27, 2013	3	5:00	Newark, New Jersey, United States	
Loss	21–10	Darren Elkins	Decision (unanimous)	UFC 154	November 17, 2012	3	5:00	Montreal, Quebec, Canada	
Win	21–9	Joey Gambino	Submission (guillotine choke)	UFC on FX: Maynard vs. Guida	June 22, 2012	1	2:47	Atlantic City, New Jersey, United States	
Win	20–9	Cole Miller	Decision (unanimous)	UFC on FX: Alves vs. Kampmann	March 3, 2012	3	5:00	Sydney, Australia	
Win	19–9	Josh Clopton	Decision (unanimous)	The Ultimate Fighter 14 Finale	December 3, 2011	3	5:00	Las Vegas, Nevada, United States	
Loss	18–9	Cole Escovedo	Submission (triangle choke)	Showdown Fights: New Blood	January 28, 2011	1	2:30	Orem, Utah, United States	
Win	18–8	Steve Sharp	Submission (guillotine choke)	WCFC: World Championship Full Contact	October 16, 2010	1	0:45	Salt Lake City, Utah, United States	
Win	17–8	Dennis Davis	Submission (triangle choke)	Showdown Fights: Respect	September 24, 2010	1	1:22	Orem, Utah, United States	
Win	16–8	James Francis	Submission (guillotine choke)	WCFC: The Beginning	September 4, 2010	1	0:21	Ogden, Utah, United States	
Win	15–8	Enoch Wilson	Decision (unanimous)	Throwdown Showdown 5: Homecoming	November 20, 2009	5	5:00	Orem, Utah, United States	Won the Showdown Featherweight Championship
Loss	14–8	Chad Mendes	KO (punches)	TPF: Best of Both Worlds	July 16, 2009	1	0:44	Lemoore, California, United States	
Win	14–7	Shawn Bias	Submission (guillotine choke)	Throwdown Showdown 4: Cuatro	June 6, 2009	1	3:15	West Valley City, Utah, United States	
Win	13–7	Nick Mamalis	Submission (guillotine choke)	Throwdown Showdown 3: Big Time	February 20, 2009	1	1:25	Salt Lake City, Utah, United States	
Win	12–7	Camrann Pacheco	Submission (rear-naked choke)	Throwdown Showdown 2: The Return	September 26, 2008	1	2:29	Orem, Utah, United States	
Win	11–7	Olly Bradstreet	Submission (guillotine choke)	Total Mayhem 2	August 16, 2008	1	3:47	Ogden, Utah, United States	
Win	10–7	Travis Marx	Submission (triangle choke)	Jeremy Horn's Elite Fight Night 2	May 17, 2008	2	3:35	Salt Lake City, Utah, United States	
Win	9–7	Dan Berry	Submission	UCE: Round 30: Episode 11	March 15, 2008	1	1:27	Salt Lake City, Utah, United States	
Win	8–7	Mikael Smith	TKO (punches)	Bush Cree Promotions	August 25, 2007	2	0:12	Grand Junction, Colorado, United States	
Win	7–7	John Sharp	Submission (rear-naked choke)	Cage Fighting Championship 3	August 10, 2007	1	1:47	Ogden, Utah, United States	
Win	6–7	Lance Gorman	Submission (rear-naked choke)	UCE: Round 26: Episode 13	June 30, 2007	2	1:43	Tooele, Utah, United States	
Loss	5–7	Olly Bradstreet	Submission (guillotine choke)	UCE: Round 26: Finals	June 16, 2007	2	1:50	St. George, Utah, United States	
Win	5–6	Travis Worenscroft	Submission (rear-naked choke)	UCE: Round 26: Episode 9 Day 1	June 1, 2007	1	1:50	Salt Lake City, Utah, United States	
Loss	4–6	Matt May	TKO (punches)	XFS 5: Heavy Hitters	May 12, 2007	4	2:27	Boise, Idaho, United States	
Loss	4–5	Dwayne Shelton	Submission (rear-naked choke)	Combat Sports Challenge	March 24, 2007	1	3:14	Richmond, Virginia, United States	
Win	4–4	Matthew Rider	TKO (strikes)	UCE: Round 25: Episode 9 Day 1	March 2, 2007	1	2:26	West Jordan, Utah, United States	
Loss	3–4	Olly Bradstreet	Submission (rear-naked choke)	UCE: Round 23: Finals	November 18, 2006	1	3:07	West Valley City, Utah, United States	
Win	3–3	Kawaika Kauwe	Decision (split)	UCE: Round 23: Episode 6 Day 1	November 3, 2006	3	3:00	West Jordan, Utah, United States	
Loss	2–3	Kawaika Kauwe	TKO (injury)	UCE: Round 22: Episode 2	July 29, 2006	2	0:45	Tooele, Utah, United States	
Loss	2–2	Kawaika Kauwe	Technical Submission (guillotine choke)	UCE: Round 21: Underage Show	June 24, 2006	1	1:54	Salt Lake City, Utah, United States	
Win	2–1	Jared Garn	Decision (split)	UCE: Round 20: Episode 7	April 15, 2006	3	3:00	West Jordan, Utah, United States	
Loss	1–1	Olly Bradstreet	TKO (punches)	UCE: Round 18: Episode 5 Day 1	December 2, 2005	1	2:03	Salt Lake City, Utah, United States	
Win	1–0	Samuel Hewitt	Decision (split)	UCE: Round 14: Finals	April 23, 2005	3	3:00	West Valley City, Utah, United States	
