= PFL 1 (2018) =

Professional Fighters League MMA event in 2018

- Promotion: Professional Fighters League
- Date: June 7, 2018
- Venue: Hulu Theater at Madison Square Garden
- City: New York City, New York
- Estimated viewers: 138,000

Event chronology
PFL 1	PFL 2

The PFL 1 mixed martial arts event for the 2018 season of the Professional Fighters League was held on June 7, 2018, at the Hulu Theater at Madison Square Garden in New York City, New York. This was the first regular season event of the tournament and included fights only in the featherweight and heavyweight divisions.

== Background ==
Mike Kyle was expected to face Shawn Jordan at this event, however Kyle was removed from the bout for undisclosed reasons and replaced by Philipe Lins. On weigh in day, the fight suffered another set back as Jordan missed the 265-pound weight limit by over nine pounds, and the bout was scratched from the card all together. As a result, Philipe Lins was awarded 3 points via. walkover victory.

Originally fights were set between Alex Nicholson vs. Kevin Tiller and Caio Alencar vs. Jake Heun, however due to New York not allowing fighters to compete with a weight difference greater than 25 pounds, PFL reorganized the fights the day before the event to Alex Nicholson vs. Jake Heun and Caio Alencar vs. Kevin Tiller.

== Results ==
Main Card (NBCSN)
Weight class				Method	Round	Time	Notes
Featherweight	Andre Harrison	def.	Zhumabek Tursyn	Decision (unanimous) (30-27, 30-27, 30-26)	3	5:00
Featherweight	Lance Palmer	def.	Bekbulat Magomedov	Submission (rear-naked choke)	2	3:21
Featherweight	Timur Valiev	def.	Max Coga	Decision (unanimous) (30-27, 30-27, 29-28)	3	5:00
Heavyweight	Alex Nicholson	def.	Jake Heun	KO (flying knee)	2	0:58
Preliminary card (Facebook Watch)
Heavyweight	Jared Rosholt	def.	Valdrin Istrefi	Decision (unanimous) (30-26, 30-25, 29-28)	3	5:00
Featherweight	Nazareno Malegarie	def.	Marcos Galvao	Decision (unanimous) (30-27, 29-28, 29-28)	3	5:00
Heavyweight	Kelvin Tiller	def.	Caio Alencar	KO (punch)	1	3:34
Featherweight	Steven Siler	def.	Magomed Idrisov	Submission (triangle choke)	1	4:19
Featherweight	Alexandre Almeida	def.	Lee Coville	Submission (armbar)	1	1:22
Heavyweight	Francimar Barroso	def.	Daniel Gallemore	TKO (doctor stoppage)	1	3:57
Postliminary card (Facebook Watch)
Heavyweight	Jack May	def.	Josh Copeland	TKO (body kick and punches)	1	4:30

== Standings after event ==
The point system consists of outcome based scoring and bonuses for an early win. Under the outcome based scoring system, the winner of a fight receives 3 points and the loser receives 0 points. If the fight ends in a draw, both fighters will receive 1 point. The bonus for winning a fight in the first, second, or third round is 3 points, 2 points, and 1 point respectively. For example, if a fighter wins a fight in the first round, then the fighter will receive 6 total points. If a fighter misses weight, then the fighter that missed weight will receive 0 points and his opponent will receive 3 points due to a walkover (WO) victory.

=== Featherweight ===
Fighter	Wins	Draws	Losses	1st	2nd	3rd	Total Points (Note: The eight fighters with most points (green background) advance to the playoffs)
Alexandre Almeida	1	0	0	1	0	0	6
Steven Siler	1	0	0	1	0	0	6
Lance Palmer	1	0	0	0	1	0	5
Nazareno Malegarie	1	0	0	0	0	0	3
Timur Valiev	1	0	0	0	0	0	3
Andre Harrison	1	0	0	0	0	0	3
Marcos Galvão	0	0	1	0	0	0	0
Max Coga	0	0	1	0	0	0	0
Jumabieke Tuerxun	0	0	1	0	0	0	0
Bekbulat Magomedov	0	0	1	0	0	0	0
Magomed Idrisov	0	0	1	0	0	0	0
Lee Coville	0	0	1	0	0	0	0

=== Heavyweight ===
Fighter	Wins	Draws	Losses	1st	2nd	3rd	Total Points (Note: The eight fighters with most points (green background) advance to the playoffs)
Kelvin Tiller	1	0	0	1	0	0	6
Francimar Barroso	1	0	0	1	0	0	6
Jack May	1	0	0	1	0	0	6
Alex Nicholson	1	0	0	0	1	0	5
Jared Rosholt	1	0	0	0	0	0	3
Philipe Lins	1	0	0	0	0	0	3
Valdrin Istrefi	0	0	1	0	0	0	0
Jake Heun	0	0	1	0	0	0	0
Josh Copeland	0	0	1	0	0	0	0
Daniel Gallemore	0	0	1	0	0	0	0
Caio Alencar	0	0	1	0	0	0	0
Shawn Jordan	0	0	0	0	0	0	0

== See also ==
- List of PFL events
- List of current PFL fighters
