= Jared Rosholt =

American mixed martial arts fighter

- Born: August 4, 1986 (age 40); Sandpoint, Idaho, U.S.
- Other names: The Big Show
- Height: 6 ft 2 in (188 cm)
- Weight: 240 lb (109 kg; 17 st 2 lb)
- Division: Heavyweight
- Reach: 76 1/2 in (194 cm)
- Fighting out of: Arlington, Texas, U.S.
- Team: Team Takedown, Cobra Kai Jiu-Jitsu
- Wrestling: NCAA Division I Wrestling
- Years active: 2011–2019

Mixed martial arts record
- Total: 28
- Wins: 20
- By knockout: 7
- By submission: 1
- By decision: 12
- Losses: 8
- By knockout: 6
- By submission: 1
- By decision: 1

Other information
- University: Oklahoma State
- Notable relatives: Jake Rosholt (brother)
- Mixed martial arts record from Sherdog
Medal record
Collegiate Wrestling
Representing the Oklahoma State Cowboys
NCAA Division I Championships
Silver medal – second place	2010 Omaha	285 lb
Bronze medal – third place	2009 St. Louis	285 lb
Big 12 Championships
Gold medal – first place	2008 Stillwater	285 lb
Silver medal – second place	2007 Columbia	285 lb
Silver medal – second place	2010 Norman	285 lb
Men's Submission Wrestling
Representing the United States
ADCC North American Championships
Gold medal – first place	2011 San Diego	+99kg

External image
- Jared Rosholt

Jared Rosholt is an American former mixed martial artist who competed in the Heavyweight division. A professional competitor from 2011 to 2019, Rosholt competed for the UFC, Titan FC, Professional Fighters League, and Legacy FC. He is the younger brother of former mixed martial artist and three-time NCAA Division I wrestling national champion Jake Rosholt.

== Background ==
Rosholt was born and raised in Sandpoint, Idaho, attending Sandpoint High School before moving to Oklahoma his junior year where he attended Ponca City High School. Rosholt competed in wrestling as well as football. In wrestling, Rosholt was a member of Wrestling USA Magazine's 2005 All-America Dream Team, a four-time State Champion, and a two-time national runner-up. Rosholt continued wrestling at Oklahoma State University, following in the footsteps of his older brother, Jake, a three-time National Champion for the Cowboys. Jared Rosholt went on to be a three-time All-American and finished his collegiate career with an overall record of 125-27. That record qualified him as the winningest heavyweight in the history of the Oklahoma State wrestling program. His 125 wins also qualify as the fifth-most victories by a wrestler in any weight class in Oklahoma State history. Rosholt finished fourth in his division at the 2008 NCAA wrestling championships, third in 2009, and second in 2010. Rosholt's combination of size and speed had many wondering if he would follow the lead of his older brother Jake into MMA competition.

== Mixed martial arts career ==
=== Early career ===
Rosholt made his professional mixed martial arts debut on February 26, 2011, where he won by submission (punches) in just 1:17 of the first round.

=== Titan Fighting ===
Rosholt came to fight on two days notice as a replacement to fight at Titan FC 18: Pulver vs. Davidson against Kirk Grinlinton. He won the fight by technical knockout at just 1:37 of the first round.

=== Ultimate Fighting Championship ===
Rosholt announced in mid-September that he has signed with the UFC. He made his debut against fellow newcomer Walt Harris on November 30, 2013, at The Ultimate Fighter 18 Finale. After being dropped in the first round, Rosholt rallied back in the second and third rounds, winning the fight via unanimous decision.

Rosholt was expected to face promotional newcomer Alexey Oleynik on January 25, 2014, at UFC on Fox 10. However, Oliynyk was forced out of the bout with an injury and Rosholt was pulled from the card altogether.

Rosholt faced Daniel Omielańczuk on April 11, 2014, at UFC Fight Night 39. Rosholt defeated Omielańczuk via unanimous decision.

Rosholt faced Soa Palelei on June 28, 2014, at UFC Fight Night 43. He won the fight via unanimous decision.

The rescheduled bout with Alexey Oleynik took place on November 22, 2014, at UFC Fight Night 57. Rosholt lost the fight via knockout in the first round.

Rosholt faced Josh Copeland on March 14, 2015, at UFC 185. He won the fight via TKO in the third round.

Rosholt faced Timothy Johnson on August 8, 2015, at UFC Fight Night 73. He won the fight by unanimous decision.

Rosholt faced Stefan Struve on November 14, 2015, at UFC 193. He won by unanimous decision.

Rosholt faced Roy Nelson on February 6, 2016, at UFC Fight Night 82. He lost the fight via unanimous decision and was subsequently released from the promotion.

=== Professional Fighters League ===
In his first bout after the UFC, Rosholt began with a loss against Caio Alencar, suffering a knockout via punches in the first round at WSOF 34 on December 31, 2016. After this, he rebounded against Nick Rossborough on July 29, 2017, with a unanimous decision victory at Professional Fighters League 2: Everett. In the following year, on June 7, he scored another win over Valdrin Istrefi with a unanimous decision at PFL 1. However, his winning streak ended on July 19, when he was defeated by Kelvin Tiller via a guillotine choke at PFL 4. He made a comeback and defeated the same opponent, Kelvin Tiller, with a unanimous decision in a 2018 PFL Heavyweight Quarterfinal bout. Yet, his journey saw another defeat, this time by Philipe Lins, who won via TKO stoppage at PFL 8 on October 5, 2018.

The year 2019 started with a loss to Denis Goltsov on June 6 in PFL 3, where he lost via TKO stoppage in the first round. However, he bounced back with a win against Satoshi Ishii on August 8 in PFL 6, which was decided unanimously. The winning streak continued as he defeated Muhammed Dereese with a TKO (punches) in a 2019 PFL Heavyweight Quarterfinal bout. He also emerged victorious against Kelvin Tiller, who replaced the injured Francimar Barroso, with a unanimous decision in a 2019 PFL Heavyweight Semifinal bout on October 31, 2019, at PFL 9. However, the year ended with a loss to Ali Isaev via fourth round TKO stoppage in the 2019 PFL Heavyweight Final on December 31, 2019, at PFL 10.

== Personal life ==
In addition to his brother Jake, Rosholt has three other siblings; a sister and two brothers who also competed in wrestling at Oklahoma State University.

== Championships and accomplishments ==
=== Collegiate wrestling ===
- NCAA Division I Wrestling Championships
  - (silver) 2010 NCAA Division I 285 lb Runner-up
  - (bronze) 2009 NCAA Division I 285 lb 3rd place
  - NCAA Division I All-American (Three times)
  - NCAA Division I qualifier (Four times)
- Big 12 Conference Wrestling Championships
  - (silver) 2010 Big 12 Conference 285 lb Runner-up
  - (gold) 2008 Big 12 Conference 285 lb Champion
  - (silver) 2007 Big 12 Conference 285 lb Runner-up
  - Big 12 Championship Finalist (Three times)
- Winningest heavyweight at Oklahoma State (125)

=== Submission wrestling ===
- ADCC North American Championships
  - (gold) 2011 ADCC North American +99 kg Champion

== Mixed martial arts record ==
Professional record breakdown
28 matches	20 wins	8 losses
By knockout	7	6
By submission	1	1
By decision	12	1

Res.	Record	Opponent	Method	Event	Date	Round	Time	Location	Notes
Loss	20–8	Ali Isaev	TKO (punches)	PFL 10 (2019)	December 31, 2019	4	4:09	New York City, New York, United States	2019 PFL Heavyweight Tournament Final.
Win	20–7	Kelvin Tiller	Decision (unanimous)	PFL 9 (2019)	October 31, 2019	3	5:00	Las Vegas, Nevada, United States	2019 PFL Heavyweight Tournament Semifinal.
Win	19–7	Muhammed Dereese	TKO (punches)	PFL 9 (2019)	October 31, 2019	1	3:41	Las Vegas, Nevada, United States	2019 PFL Heavyweight Tournament Quarterfinal.
Win	18–7	Satoshi Ishii	Decision (unanimous)	PFL 6 (2019)	August 8, 2019	3	5:00	Atlantic City, New Jersey, United States	
Loss	17–7	Denis Goltsov	TKO (punches)	PFL 3 (2019)	June 6, 2019	1	2:03	Uniondale, New York, United States	
Loss	17–6	Philipe Lins	TKO (punches)	PFL 8 (2018)	October 5, 2018	2	0:45	New Orleans, Louisiana, United States	2018 PFL Heavyweight Tournament Semifinal.
Win	17–5	Kelvin Tiller	Decision (unanimous)	PFL 8 (2018)	October 5, 2018	2	5:00	New Orleans, Louisiana, United States	2018 PFL Heavyweight Tournament Quarterfinal.
Loss	16–5	Kelvin Tiller	Submission (guillotine choke)	PFL 4 (2018)	July 19, 2018	2	0:54	Uniondale, New York, United States	
Win	16–4	Valdrin Istrefi	Decision (unanimous)	PFL 1 (2018)	June 7, 2018	3	5:00	New York City, New York, United States	
Win	15–4	Nick Rossborough	Decision (unanimous)	PFL Everett	July 29, 2017	3	5:00	Everett, Washington, United States	
Loss	14–4	Caio Alencar	KO (punches)	WSOF 34	December 31, 2016	1	1:17	New York City, New York, United States	
Loss	14–3	Roy Nelson	Decision (unanimous)	UFC Fight Night: Hendricks vs. Thompson	February 6, 2016	3	5:00	Las Vegas, Nevada, United States	
Win	14–2	Stefan Struve	Decision (unanimous)	UFC 193	November 15, 2015	3	5:00	Melbourne, Australia	
Win	13–2	Timothy Johnson	Decision (unanimous)	UFC Fight Night: Teixeira vs. Saint Preux	August 8, 2015	3	5:00	Nashville, Tennessee, United States	
Win	12–2	Josh Copeland	TKO (punches and elbows)	UFC 185	March 14, 2015	3	3:12	Dallas, Texas, United States	
Loss	11–2	Aleksei Oleinik	KO (punches)	UFC Fight Night: Edgar vs. Swanson	November 22, 2014	1	3:21	Austin, Texas, United States	
Win	11–1	Soa Palelei	Decision (unanimous)	UFC Fight Night: Te Huna vs. Marquardt	June 28, 2014	3	5:00	Auckland, New Zealand	
Win	10–1	Daniel Omielańczuk	Decision (unanimous)	UFC Fight Night: Nogueira vs. Nelson	April 11, 2014	3	5:00	Abu Dhabi, United Arab Emirates	
Win	9–1	Walt Harris	Decision (unanimous)	The Ultimate Fighter: Team Rousey vs. Team Tate Finale	November 30, 2013	3	5:00	Las Vegas, Nevada, United States	
Win	8–1	Jason Walraven	KO (punch)	C3 Fights: Summer Slamfest 2	August 2, 2013	1	0:34	Newkirk, Oklahoma, United States	
Win	7–1	Richard White	TKO (punches)	C3 Fights: Fighting For "Moore" Than Money	June 7, 2013	1	1:38	Newkirk, Oklahoma, United States	
Win	6–1	Bobby Brents	Decision (unanimous)	C3 Fights: Rock Em Sock Em Weekend	April 27, 2013	3	5:00	Clinton, Oklahoma, United States	
Win	5–1	Richard Odoms	Decision (unanimous)	Legacy FC 17	February 1, 2013	3	5:00	San Antonio, Texas, United States	
Loss	4–1	Derrick Lewis	KO (punches)	Legacy FC 13	August 17, 2012	2	4:41	Dallas, Texas, United States	For the Legacy FC Heavyweight Championship.
Win	4–0	Robert Haney	TKO (submission to knees to the body)	C3 MMA Championship Fights	June 4, 2011	1	1:56	Concho, Oklahoma, United States	
Win	3–0	Kirk Grinlinton	TKO (punches)	Titan FC 18: Pulver vs. Davidson	May 27, 2011	1	1:37	Kansas City, Kansas, United States	
Win	2–0	Ray Clayton	Submission (keylock)	Cowboy MMA: Caged Cowboys	May 21, 2011	2	4:48	Ponca City, Oklahoma, United States	
Win	1–0	Dee Burchfield	TKO (submission to punches)	Art of War Cage Fights	February 26, 2011	1	1:17	Ponca City, Oklahoma, United States	Heavyweight debut.

== See also ==
- List of male mixed martial artists
