= Hans Stringer =

Dutch mixed martial arts fighter

- Born: July 6, 1987 (age 39); Zevenbergen, Netherlands
- Height: 6 ft 3 in (1.91 m)
- Weight: 205 lb (93 kg; 14 st 9 lb)
- Division: Heavyweight; Light Heavyweight
- Reach: 73 in (190 cm)
- Fighting out of: Boca Raton, Florida, United States; Rhenen, Netherlands
- Team: Blackzilians; Jaco Hybrid Training Center
- Rank: Third degree Black belt in Brazilian Jiu-Jitsu
- Years active: 2005–2016

Mixed martial arts record
- Total: 32
- Wins: 22
- By knockout: 9
- By submission: 8
- By decision: 5
- Losses: 7
- By knockout: 3
- By submission: 1
- By decision: 3
- Draws: 3

Other information
- Mixed martial arts record from Sherdog
- Last updated on: November 9, 2015

Hans Stringer (born July 6, 1987) is a Dutch mixed martial artist who last competed in 2016.

== Background ==
Growing up in the Netherlands, Stringer began training in kickboxing in 2003, and mixed martial arts a year later. Stringer spent some time studying to become an electrician before deciding to make a career as a fighter.

Stringer holds a 3rd degree black belt in Brazilian jiu-jitsu and teaches at Jiu Jitsu Factory The Netherlands.

== Mixed martial arts career ==
=== Early career ===
After a 5-0 amateur career, Stringer made his professional debut at the age of 18 in 2005. Over the next several years he competed primarily in the light heavyweight division in regional promotions all over Europe. He was able to compile a record of 21–5–3, before making an appearance for the World Series of Fighting on October 26, 2013. After that fight, Stringer was signed by the UFC in February 2014.

=== Ultimate Fighting Championship ===
Stringer made his promotional debut against Francimar Barroso on March 23, 2014, at UFC Fight Night 38. Stringer won the back-and-forth fight via split decision.

Stringer next faced Fábio Maldonado on October 25, 2014, at UFC 179. He lost the fight via TKO in the second round.

Stringer faced Ilir Latifi on July 18, 2015, at UFC Fight Night 72. He lost the fight via knockout in the first round. Following back to back losses, Stringer was released from the promotion.

== Mixed martial arts record ==
Professional record breakdown
33 matches	22 wins	8 losses
By knockout	9	4
By submission	8	1
By decision	5	3
Draws	3	

Res.	Record	Opponent	Method	Event	Date	Round	Time	Location	Notes
Loss	22–8–3	Muslim Makhmudov	KO (punch to the body)	ACB 45: Siberia vs. Caucasus	September 17, 2016	1	2:22	Saint Petersburg, Russia	
Loss	22–7–3	Ilir Latifi	KO (punches)	UFC Fight Night: Bisping vs. Leites	July 18, 2015	1	0:56	Glasgow, Scotland	
Loss	22–6–3	Fábio Maldonado	TKO (punches)	UFC 179	October 25, 2014	2	4:06	Rio de Janeiro, Brazil	
Win	22–5–3	Francimar Barroso	Decision (split)	UFC Fight Night: Shogun vs. Henderson 2	March 23, 2014	3	5:00	Natal, Brazil	
Draw	21–5–3	Francisco France	Draw (unanimous)	WSOF 6	October 26, 2013	3	5:00	Coral Gables, Florida, United States	
Win	21–5–2	Marius Panin	TKO (punches)	Team Super Pro: Sport Center Gala 2	December 9, 2012	1	1:46	Zevenbergen, Netherlands	
Win	20–5–2	Michal Fijalka	Decision (unanimous)	MMA Attack 2	April 27, 2012	3	5:00	Katowice, Poland	
Win	19–5–2	Sorin Florea	TKO (punches)	Team Super Pro: Sport Center Gala	February 11, 2012	1	2:40	Zevenbergen, Netherlands	
Win	19–5–2	Zsolt Balla	TKO (punches)	Beast of the East 15	May 28, 2011	1	3:02	Zutphen, Netherlands	
Draw	18–5–2	Attila Végh	Draw (unanimous)	Nitrianska Noc Bojovnikov 3	February 5, 2011	3	5:00	Nitra, Slovakia	
Loss	17–5–1	Joseph Billstein	Decision (unanimous)	Tempel Fight School: Mix Fight Gala XI	November 27, 2010	2	5:00	Sindelfingen, Germany	
Win	17–4–1	Michal Fijalka	Technical Submission (kimura)	Beast of the East: Grabowski vs. Kita	June 12, 2010	1	1:51	Gdynia, Poland	
Win	16–4–1	Milan Hasanzadah	TKO (punches)	Team Super Pro: 10th Anniversary	March 7, 2010	1	N/A	Nijmegen, Netherlands	
Win	15–4–1	Michael Knapp	Decision (split)	Beast of the East: Chahbari vs. Souwer	January 30, 2010	2	5:00	Zutphen, Netherlands	Heavyweight bout.
Win	14–4–1	Dawid Baziak	TKO (punches)	Tempel Fight School: Mix Fight Gala IX	December 5, 2009	1	1:39	Darmstadt, Germany	
Win	13–4–1	Arnoldas Joknys	TKO (punches)	Beast of the East 12	November 14, 2009	1	N/A	Gdynia, Poland	
Win	12–4–1	Nills van Noord	Submission (triangle armbar)	Ultimate Glory 11	October 17, 2009	1	2:20	Amsterdam, Netherlands	
Win	11–4–1	Yuji Sakaragi	TKO (punches)	DEEP: 43	August 23, 2009	2	2:11	Tokyo, Japan	
Loss	10–4–1	Andre Fyeet	KO (punches)	Gentlemen Fight Night 4	June 13, 2009	1	N/A	Tilburg, Netherlands	
Win	10–3–1	Krzysztof Kulak	Decision (unanimous)	Beast of the East 11	January 24, 2009	2	5:00	Zutphen, Netherlands	
Win	9–3–1	Soltan Burdas	Submission (triangle choke)	K.O. Events: Tough Is Not Enough	October 5, 2008	1	N/A	Rotterdam, Netherlands	
Win	8–3–1	Don Rocco	Decision (unanimous)	Ultimate Glory 8	July 6, 2008	3	5:00	Nijmegen, Netherlands	Heavyweight bout.
Win	7–3–1	Ricardo Van Kooten	TKO (punches)	Beast of the East 10	May 31, 2008	1	N/A	Zutphen, Netherlands	
Win	6–3–1	Marco Biswana	Submission (rear-naked choke)	Ultimate Glory 7	January 20, 2008	1	1:24	Amersfoort, Netherlands	
Loss	5–3–1	Bastien Huveneers	Decision (unanimous)	Klash Champions Battlefield 4	December 16, 2007	2	5:00	Netherlands	
Win	5–2–1	Adrian Stoiti	Submission (rear-naked choke)	Klash Champions Battlefield 3	October 26, 2007	1	4:09	Sibiu, Romania	
Draw	4–2–1	Sbigniev Romanovskij	Draw (unanimous)	Bushido Lithuania	September 29, 2007	2	5:00	Šiauliai, Lithuania	Return to Light Heavyweight.
Loss	4–2	Dion Staring	Decision (unanimous)	Ultimate Glory 7	September 9, 2007	3	5:00	Amersfoort, Netherlands	
Win	4–1	Marton Marton	Submission (choke)	Gentlemen Fight Night 2	June 2, 2007	1	N/A	Tilburg, Netherlands	Light Heavyweight bout.
Win	3–1	Stjepan Bekavac	Submission (armbar)	Kam Lung 5	October 8, 2006	1	N/A	Zuidland, Netherlands	Heavyweight debut.
Win	2–1	Matteo Pirran	TKO (strikes)	King of Kings	July 2, 2006	2	N/A	Milan, Italy	
Loss	1–1	Igor Araújo	Submission (triangle choke)	Shooto Holland: Playing With Fire	April 2, 2006	1	1:27	Ede, Netherlands	
Win	1–0	Jordi Vinyals	Submission (armbar)	Shooto Belgium: Genesis	December 17, 2005	1	1:37	Hainaut, Belgium	

== See also ==
- List of male mixed martial artists
