= Alex Nicholson (fighter) =

American mixed martial arts fighter

- Born: May 2, 1990 (age 36); Apopka, Florida, United States
- Other names: Spartan
- Height: 6 ft 4 in (1.93 m)
- Weight: 230 lb (104 kg; 16 st 6 lb)
- Division: Heavyweight; Light Heavyweight; Middleweight
- Reach: 77.5 in (197 cm)
- Stance: Orthodox
- Team: American Top Team Orlando; UFC Gym Winter Springs
- Rank: Blue belt in Brazilian Jiu-Jitsu; Black belt in Tae Kwon Do
- Years active: 2014–present

Professional boxing record
- Total: 2
- Wins: 1
- By knockout: 1
- Losses: 1
- By knockout: 1

Mixed martial arts record
- Total: 35
- Wins: 20
- By knockout: 18
- By submission: 2
- Losses: 14
- By knockout: 9
- By submission: 1
- By decision: 4
- No contests: 1

Amateur record
- Total: 11
- Wins: 4
- Losses: 7

Other information
- Boxing record from BoxRec
- Mixed martial arts record from Sherdog

Alex Nicholson (born May 2, 1990) is an American professional mixed martial artist formerly competing in the heavyweight division of the Professional Fighters League. A professional competitor since 2014, he has competed for the UFC and Legacy Fighting Alliance.

== Background ==
Born and raised in Apopka, Florida, Nicholson played basketball growing up before being introduced to martial arts and boxing. In boxing, he was a Florida Golden Gloves Champion, as well as a state amateur Muay Thai champion, in which he was undefeated.

== Mixed martial arts career ==
=== Early career ===
After an amateur career in 2012 and 2013 where he held a record of 4–7, Nicholson made his professional MMA debut in February 2014. He amassed a record of 6 wins against 1 loss before signing with the Ultimate Fighting Championship.

=== Ultimate Fighting Championship ===
Nicholson made his UFC debut on February 6, 2016, at UFC Fight Night: Hendricks vs. Thompson. He faced Misha Cirkunov on the card and lost the fight via submission in the second round.

In his second fight for the promotion, Nicholson faced Devin Clark in a Middleweight bout at UFC Fight Night: McDonald vs. Lineker on July 13, 2016. He won the fight via knockout in the first round.

In his third fight for the promotion, Nicholson faced Sam Alvey at UFC Fight Night: dos Anjos vs. Ferguson on November 5, 2016. He lost the fight by unanimous decision.

In his fourth fight for the promotion, Nicholson faced Jack Hermansson at UFC Fight Night: Gustafsson vs. Teixeira on May 28, 2017. He lost the fight via TKO in the first round. Subsequent to this fight, Nicholson was released from the promotion.

=== Professional Fighters League ===
In June 2018, Nicholson entered into the $1 million Heavyweight tournament held by Professional Fighters League. He faced Jake Heun in the opening round at PFL 1 on June 7, 2018. He won the fight via knockout due to a flying knee in the second round. On July 19, Nicholson lost via TKO to Philipe Lins at PFL 4. In October 2018, Nicholson defeated Jack May by TKO but then lost later that night via KO to Josh Copeland.

In June 2019, Nicholson entered the second season of PFL's Heavyweight tournament and lost a decision to Francimar Barroso. In August, he defeated Zeke Tuinei-Wiley. On October 31, Nicholson lost a rematch against Barroso again by decision. In December 2019, Nicholson was suspended by the Nevada State Athletic Commission for four years due to testing positive for three steroids.

=== Regional circuit ===
Nicholson was scheduled to headline Gamebred FC 2 against Antônio Silva on September 11, 2021. However, Silva's prevailing contract with Eagle Fighting Championship prevented him from competing at the event and he was initially replaced by Jack May. In turn, May tested positive for COVID-19 and was replaced by Jonathan Ivey. Furthermore, the event was postponed to take place on October 1, 2021, in order to ensure housing for those impacted of Hurricane Ida. He won the bout via TKO in the first round.

Nicholson faced Tony Lopez on December 17, 2021, at Gamebred FC 3. He won the bout via KO in the first round.

Nicholson faced Oscar Sosa for the Titan FC Heavyweight Championship on July 29, 2022, at Titan FC 78. He won the bout and title via anaconda choke in the first round.

Nicholson defended his title against Valter Ignacio at Titan FC 82/ SBC 47: Revenge on June 2, 2023. losing the bout in the fourth round after tapping out due to injury.

Nicholson faced Prince McLean at Gamebred Bareknuckle MMA 6 on November 10, 2023. He won the fight via knockout 19 seconds into the bout.

Nicholson faced Chase Sherman at Gamebred Bareknuckle MMA 7 on March 2, 2024. Nicholson lost in the first round by way of knockout.

== Professional boxing ==
Nicholson made his professional boxing debut in 2015, a KO win. He fought again two months later and lost via KO to Simon Kean.

== Personal life ==
Nicholson has a son with fellow mixed martial artist Hannah Goldy.

In 2016, Nicholson faced criticism for the racially-charged comments he made while cornering teammate Mike Perry in his bout against South Korean fighter Hyun Gyu Lim. During the fight, Nicholson was recorded shouting "He [Lim] can't even open his motherfucking eyes." The UFC issued a formal statement that any future racially derogatory remarks by Nicholson "could result in a suspension from competition, or termination of his contract." Prior to the fight, Nicholson made a Facebook post where he referred to Lim as "dung him Kong Jung foo" and claimed Perry would "rip [Lim's] limbs off."

== Mixed martial arts record ==
Professional record breakdown
35 matches	20 wins	14 losses
By knockout	18	9
By submission	2	1
By decision	0	4
No contests	1	

Res.	Record	Opponent	Method	Event	Date	Round	Time	Location	Notes
Win	20–14 (1)	Brad Taylor	TKO (punches)	Duel Arena 1	August 29, 2026	1	2:47	Orlando, Florida, United States	
Loss	19–14 (1)	Yoel Romero	TKO (submission to punches)	Gamebred Bareknuckle MMA 10	May 1, 2026	1	1:11	Miami, Florida, United States	Light Heavyweight bout.
Loss	19–13 (1)	Darion Abbey	TKO (punches)	XFC 52	March 28, 2025	1	1:17	Iowa City, Iowa, United States	
Loss	19–12 (1)	Frank Tate	KO (punches)	Gamebred Bareknuckle MMA 8	November 15, 2024	1	0:56	Biloxi, Mississippi, United States	
Win	19–11 (1)	Zac Pauga	TKO (elbows and punches)	XFC 51	September 27, 2024	2	1:16	Milwaukee, Wisconsin, United States	
NC	18–11 (1)	Carl Seumanutafa	NC (overturned)	XFC: Detroit Grand Prix 2	May 31, 2024	1	4:09	Detroit, Michigan, United States	Originally a TKO (elbow and punches) win by Nicholson; overturned by the Michigan Unarmed Combat Commission.
Loss	18–11	Chase Sherman	KO (punch)	Gamebred Bareknuckle MMA 7	March 2, 2024	1	3:57	Orlando, Florida, United States	
Win	18–10	Prince McLean	KO (punches)	Gamebred Bareknuckle MMA 6	November 10, 2023	1	0:19	Biloxi, Mississippi, United States	
Loss	17–10	Valter Walker	TKO (retirement)	Titan FC 82 / SBC 47	June 2, 2023	4	0:50	Novi Sad, Serbia	Lost the Titan FC Heavyweight Championship.
Win	17–9	Oscar Sosa	Submission (anaconda choke)	Titan FC 78	July 29, 2022	1	3:47	Santo Domingo, Dominican Republic	Won the vacant Titan FC Heavyweight Championship.
Win	16–9	Tony Lopez	KO (knee)	Gamebred Bareknuckle MMA 3	December 17, 2021	1	1:48	Biloxi, Mississippi, United States	
Win	15–9	Johnathan Ivey	TKO (knees and elbows)	Gamebred Bareknuckle MMA 2	October 1, 2021	1	1:56	Biloxi, Mississippi, United States	
Loss	14–9	Francimar Barroso	Decision (unanimous)	PFL 9 (2019)	October 31, 2019	2	5:00	Las Vegas, Nevada, United States	2019 PFL Heavyweight Tournament Quarterfinal.
Win	14–8	Zeke Tuinei-Wily	TKO (punches)	PFL 6 (2019)	August 8, 2019	1	3:07	Atlantic City, New Jersey, United States	
Loss	13–8	Francimar Barroso	Decision (split)	PFL 3 (2019)	June 6, 2019	3	5:00	Uniondale, New York, United States	
Loss	13–7	Josh Copeland	KO (punch)	PFL 8 (2018)	October 5, 2018	1	1:27	New Orleans, Louisiana, United States	2018 PFL Heavyweight Tournament Semifinal.
Win	13–6	Jack May	TKO (leg kick and punches)	PFL 8 (2018)	October 5, 2018	1	2:03	New Orleans, Louisiana, United States	2018 PFL Heavyweight Tournament Quarterfinal.
Loss	12–6	Philipe Lins	TKO (punches)	PFL 4 (2018)	July 19, 2018	2	3:39	Uniondale, New York, United States	
Win	12–5	Jake Heun	KO (flying knee)	PFL 1 (2018)	June 7, 2018	2	0:58	New York City, New York, United States	
Win	11–5	Ricco Rodriguez	TKO (submission to punches)	CamSoda Legends 1	April 26, 2018	1	1: 27	Fort Lauderdale, Florida, United States	
Loss	10–5	Ryan Spann	KO (punches)	LFA 32	January 26, 2018	1	4:24	Lake Charles, Louisiana, United States	For the LFA Light Heavyweight Championship.
Win	10–4	Daniel Madrid	TKO (punches)	Iron Boy MMA 9	November 18, 2017	1	1:42	Phoenix, Arizona, United States	Middleweight bout.
Win	9–4	Chris Barnett	KO (elbow)	Island Fights 42	October 14, 2017	1	0:40	Pensacola, Florida, United States	
Win	8–4	Demoreo Dennis	KO (elbow)	Next Level Fight Club 8	September 16, 2017	1	1:06	Raleigh, North Carolina, United States	Return to Heavyweight.
Loss	7–4	Jack Hermansson	TKO (punches)	UFC Fight Night: Gustafsson vs. Teixeira	May 28, 2017	1	2:00	Stockholm, Sweden	
Loss	7–3	Sam Alvey	Decision (unanimous)	The Ultimate Fighter Latin America 3 Finale: dos Anjos vs. Ferguson	November 5, 2016	3	5:00	Mexico City, Mexico	
Win	7–2	Devin Clark	KO (punch)	UFC Fight Night: McDonald vs. Lineker	July 13, 2016	1	4:57	Sioux Falls, South Dakota, United States	Return to Middleweight.
Loss	6–2	Misha Cirkunov	Submission (neck crank)	UFC Fight Night: Hendricks vs. Thompson	February 6, 2016	2	1:28	Las Vegas, Nevada, United States	Light Heavyweight bout.
Win	6–1	Chaz Morgan	TKO (punches)	Island Fights 34	August 1, 2015	1	4:03	Pensacola, Florida, United States	Won the Island Fights Heavyweight Championship.
Win	5–1	Dillon Cleckler	KO (spinning backfist)	Island Fights 33	March 28, 2015	2	1:34	Pensacola, Florida, United States	
Win	4–1	Ronnie Phillips	TKO (head kick and punches)	Florida CF 1	January 30, 2015	1	4:08	Fern Park, Florida, United States	Light Heavyweight bout.
Win	3–1	Chase Sherman	TKO (punches)	Island Fights 31	December 5, 2014	1	N/A	Pensacola, Florida, United States	Heavyweight debut.
Win	2–1	Derrick Brown	Submission (neck crank)	Top Alliance Combat 3	September 6, 2014	1	4:56	McDonough, Georgia, United States	Light Heavyweight debut.
Loss	1–1	Mark Inge	Decision (unanimous)	Top Alliance Combat 1	April 12, 2014	3	5:00	McDonough, Georgia, United States	
Win	1–0	Baraq Hunter	KO	Island Fights 27	February 8, 2014	1	0:37	Pensacola, Florida, United States	Middleweight debut.

== Professional boxing record ==
2 fights	1 win	1 loss
By knockout	1	1

No.	Result	Record	Opponent	Type	Round, time	Date	Location	Notes
2	Loss	1–1	(Canada) Simon Kean	KO	1 (4), 2:38	4 Dec 2015	(United States) Métropolis, Montreal, Quebec, Canada	
1	Win	1–0	(United States) Joseph White	KO	2 (4), 2:24	10 Oct 2015	(United States) Florida Orange Event Center, Lakeland, Florida, US	
