= Philipe Lins =

Brazilian mixed martial artist

- Born: Luiz Philipe Lins Pimentel do Amaral; August 17, 1985 (age 41); Natal, Rio Grande do Norte, Brazil
- Other names: Monstro
- Height: 6 ft 1 in (185 cm)
- Weight: 205 lb (93 kg; 14 st 9 lb)
- Division: Light Heavyweight (2005–2018; 2023–2024); Heavyweight (2018–2022, 2026)
- Reach: 79 in (201 cm)
- Fighting out of: Coconut Creek, Florida, U.S.
- Team: Nova União Kimura (formerly); American Top Team
- Rank: Black belt in Brazilian Jiu-Jitsu
- Years active: 2005–2006; 2011–present

Mixed martial arts record
- Total: 24
- Wins: 18
- By knockout: 9
- By submission: 4
- By decision: 5
- Losses: 6
- By knockout: 5
- By decision: 1

Other information
- Mixed martial arts record from Sherdog

Luiz Philipe Lins Pimentel do Amaral (born August 17, 1985) is a Brazilian mixed martial artist, who formerly competed in the light heavyweight division of the Ultimate Fighting Championship. He won the 2018 Professional Fighters League heavyweight tournament.

== Mixed martial arts career ==
=== Early career ===
Lins made his professional MMA debut in August 2005. For the first eight years of his career he fought exclusively in his native country Brazil, although he did take an extended break from MMA competition from 2006 to 2011. He remained undefeated during his time in Brazil, earning a record of seven wins and no losses.

Before signing with Bellator, Lins was ranked by MMA news site Bloody Elbow as the second best Light Heavyweight prospect in 2012.

=== Bellator MMA ===
Lins made his North American and Bellator MMA debut in April 2014 at Bellator 116. He faced Travis Clark and won via rear-naked choke submission in the first round.

In the summer of 2014, Lins was announced as a participant in the Bellator Light Heavyweight Tournament. He faced Austin Heidlage in the opening quarterfinals at Bellator 121 and won via submission in the first round. He faced Kelly Anundson in the semifinals and lost due to a knee injury.

Lins was expected to return against Francis Carmont at Bellator MMA & Glory: Dynamite 1 on September 19, 2015, however pulled out of the bout due to illness.

Lins faced Guilherme Viana at Bellator 159 on July 23, 2016. He won the fight via TKO in the second round.

Lins faced Kleber Silva at Bellator 168 on December 10, 2016. He lost the fight via TKO in the second round.

Lins faced Vadim Nemkov at Bellator 182 on August 25, 2017. He lost the fight via knockout in the first round.

On February 20, 2018 it was announced that Bellator had released Lins from the promotion.

=== Professional Fighters League ===
In the fall of 2018, Lins entered the PFL Heavyweight tournament. At PFL 8 on October 5, 2018, he defeated Caio Alencar by guillotine choke submission in the quarterfinal round and then defeated Jared Rosholt by TKO in the semifinal round. Lins faced Josh Copeland in the finals at PFL 11 on December 31, 2018. He won the fight via technical knockout in the fourth round to win the PFL Heavyweight Tournament and earn the $1 million cash prize.

Lins was expected to defend his championship in the second season of PFL, but had to withdraw from the whole season due to an injury.

=== Ultimate Fighting Championship ===
Lins was scheduled to make his UFC debut against former UFC Heavyweight Champion, Andrei Arlovski on May 2, 2020 at UFC Fight Night: Hermansson vs. Weidman. However, on April 9, Dana White, the president of UFC announced that this event was postponed and rescheduled to May 13, 2020 at UFC Fight Night: Smith vs. Teixeira. He lost the fight via unanimous decision.

Lins faced Tanner Boser on June 27, 2020 at UFC on ESPN: Poirier vs. Hooker. He lost the fight via knockout in round one.

Lins was scheduled to face Don'Tale Mayes on November 7, 2020 at UFC on ESPN: Santos vs. Teixeira. However, on October 14, it was announced that Lins had a knee injury and pulled out of the event. Mayes is now expected to face Roque Martinez at this event.

Lins was scheduled to face Ben Rothwell on March 13, 2021 at UFC Fight Night 187. However, during the week leading up to the event the bout was removed from the card due to undisclosed reasons. The pairing remained intact and the bout was rescheduled on May 8, 2021 at UFC on ESPN 24. While Rothwell made weight without issue, Lins never showed up to the weigh-ins and withdrew from the bout due to an illness. The bout was rescheduled again for May 22, 2021 at UFC Fight Night: Font vs. Garbrandt. However, yet again, Lins was pulled from the event for undisclosed reason and he was replaced by newcomer Askhar Mozharov.

Lins was scheduled to face Ovince Saint Preux on November 13, 2021 at UFC Fight Night 197. However Saint Preux withdrew from the fight for undisclosed reasons and the bout was cancelled.

Lins was scheduled to face Azamat Murzakanov on December 4, 2021 at UFC on ESPN 31. However, Lins withdrew from the event for undisclosed reasons and he was replaced by Jared Vanderaa.

Lins faced Marcin Prachnio on April 23, 2022 at UFC Fight Night 205. He won the fight via unanimous decision.

Lins was scheduled to face Maxim Grishin on October 1, 2022, at UFC Fight Night 211. Despite both men weighing in successfully, the bout was cancelled while the event was in progress due to an undisclosed medical issue.

Lins was scheduled to face Ovince Saint Preux, replacing Alexander Gustafsson, on 10 December 2022, at UFC 282. However, Lins subsequently withdrew from the bout due to an undisclosed reason.

The match between Lins and Ovince Saint Preux was rescheduled for February 18, 2023 at UFC Fight Night 219. He won the fight via knockout in the first round.

Lins faced Maxim Grishin on June 3, 2023, at UFC on ESPN 46. He won the fight via unanimous decision.

Lins was scheduled to face Ion Cuțelaba on October 7, 2023 at UFC Fight Night 229. However the bout was cancelled the day of the event for unknown reasons.

Lins faced Ion Cuțelaba at on March 9, 2024, at UFC 299. He won by unanimous decision.

Lins was released from the UFC on March 21, 2024.

=== Global Fight League ===
On December 11, 2024, it was announced that Lins was signed by Global Fight League. However, in April 2025, it was reported that all GFL events were cancelled indefinitely.

=== Most Valuable Promotions ===
Lins faced former UFC Heavyweight Champion Francis Ngannou in a five-round Heavyweight bout at MVP MMA 1, on May 16, 2026. He lost the bout via knockout in the first round.

== Championships and accomplishments ==
- Professional Fighters League
  - 2018 PFL Heavyweight Championship

== Mixed martial arts record ==
Professional record breakdown
24 matches	18 wins	6 losses
By knockout	9	5
By submission	4	0
By decision	5	1

Res.	Record	Opponent	Method	Event	Date	Round	Time	Location	Notes
Loss	18–6	Francis Ngannou	KO (punch)	MVP MMA: Rousey vs. Carano	May 16, 2026	1	4:31	Inglewood, California, United States	Return to Heavyweight.
Win	18–5	Ion Cuțelaba	Decision (unanimous)	UFC 299	March 9, 2024	3	5:00	Miami, Florida, United States	
Win	17–5	Maxim Grishin	Decision (unanimous)	UFC on ESPN: Kara-France vs. Albazi	June 3, 2023	3	5:00	Las Vegas, Nevada, United States	
Win	16–5	Ovince Saint Preux	KO (punches)	UFC Fight Night: Andrade vs. Blanchfield	February 18, 2023	1	0:49	Las Vegas, Nevada, United States	
Win	15–5	Marcin Prachnio	Decision (unanimous)	UFC Fight Night: Lemos vs. Andrade	April 23, 2022	3	5:00	Las Vegas, Nevada, United States	Return to Light Heavyweight.
Loss	14–5	Tanner Boser	KO (punches)	UFC on ESPN: Poirier vs. Hooker	June 27, 2020	1	2:41	Las Vegas, Nevada, United States	
Loss	14–4	Andrei Arlovski	Decision (unanimous)	UFC Fight Night: Smith vs. Teixeira	May 13, 2020	3	5:00	Jacksonville, Florida, United States	
Win	14–3	Josh Copeland	TKO (knees and punches)	PFL 11 (2018)	December 31, 2018	4	0:30	New York City, New York, United States	Won the 2018 PFL Heavyweight Tournament.
Win	13–3	Jared Rosholt	TKO (punches)	PFL 8 (2018)	October 5, 2018	2	0:45	New Orleans, Louisiana, United States	2018 PFL Heavyweight Tournament Semifinal.
Win	12–3	Caio Alencar	Submission (guillotine choke)	PFL 8 (2018)	October 5, 2018	1	0:58	New Orleans, Louisiana, United States	2018 PFL Heavyweight Tournament Quarterfinal.
Win	11–3	Alex Nicholson	TKO (punches)	PFL 4 (2018)	July 19, 2018	2	3:39	Uniondale, New York, United States	Heavyweight debut.
Loss	10–3	Vadim Nemkov	KO (punches)	Bellator 182	August 25, 2017	1	3:03	Verona, New York, United States	
Loss	10–2	Kleber Silva	TKO (punches)	Bellator 168	December 10, 2016	2	3:42	Florence, Italy	
Win	10–1	Guilherme Viana	TKO (punches)	Bellator 159	July 23, 2016	2	1:13	Mulvane, Kansas, United States	
Loss	9–1	Kelly Anundson	TKO (knee injury)	Bellator 122	July 25, 2014	1	1:40	Temecula, California, United States	2014 Bellator Summer Series Light Heavyweight Tournament Semifinal.
Win	9–0	Austen Heidlage	Submission (rear-naked choke)	Bellator 121	June 6, 2014	1	2:45	Thackerville, Oklahoma, United States	2014 Bellator Summer Series Light Heavyweight Tournament Quarterfinal.
Win	8–0	Travis Clark	Submission (rear-naked choke)	Bellator 116	April 11, 2014	1	0:40	Temecula, California, United States	
Win	7–0	Armando Sixel	TKO (punches)	Bitetti Combat 18	October 31, 2013	2	3:30	Rio de Janeiro, Brazil	
Win	6–0	Ubiratan Lima	Decision (unanimous)	Bitetti Combat 17	September 6, 2013	3	5:00	Rio de Janeiro, Brazil	
Win	5–0	Daniel Alexandre Freitas Bonfim	KO (punches)	Rockstrike MMA 1	July 9, 2011	1	4:40	Brasília, Brazil	
Win	4–0	Antonio Mendes	Decision (unanimous)	Nordeste Combat 1	September 6, 2006	3	5:00	Natal, Brazil	
Win	3–0	Anderson Cruz	Submission (triangle choke)	Tremons Fight 2	January 21, 2006	1	2:13	João Câmara, Brazil	
Win	2–0	Antonio Mendes	KO (punches)	Bad Boy: Vale Tudo Open	December 8, 2005	2	N/A	Fortaleza, Brazil	
Win	1–0	Maurilio de Souza da Silva	TKO (punches)	Mossoró Fight 1	August 26, 2005	2	1:05	Mossoró, Brazil	Light Heavyweight debut.

== See also ==
- List of current UFC fighters
