= PFL 4 (2018) =

Professional Fighters League MMA event in 2018

- Promotion: Professional Fighters League
- Date: July 19, 2018
- Venue: Nassau Coliseum
- City: Uniondale, New York
- Estimated viewers: 101,000

Event chronology
PFL 3	PFL 4	PFL 5

The PFL 4 mixed martial arts event for the 2018 season of the Professional Fighters League was held on July 19, 2018, at the Nassau Coliseum in Uniondale, New York. This was the fourth regular season event of 2018 and included fights in the featherweight and heavyweight divisions.

== Background ==
Originally fights were set between Bekbulat Magomedov vs. Magomed Idrisov and Timur Valiev vs. Lee Coville, however Idrisov and Coville were forced to pull out for undisclosed reasons. At first Carl Deaton and Darrick Minner were scheduled as replacements, but on weigh in day both missed the 146-pound limit, and as a result PFL elected to pull them off the card, and instead pair up their intended opponents to create Bekbulat Magomedov vs. Timur Valiev.

== Results ==
Main Card (NBCSN)
Weight class				Method	Round	Time	Notes
Featherweight	Lance Palmer	def.	Zhumabek Tursyn	Submission (rear-naked choke)	3	4:34
Featherweight	Andre Harrison	def.	Nazareno Malegarie	Decision (unanimous) (30-27, 30-27, 30-27)	3	5:00
Heavyweight	Francimar Barroso	def.	Jack May	Submission (arm triangle)	1	1:36
Featherweight	Steven Siler	def.	Alexandre Almeida	Technical Submission (guillotine choke)	1	0:34
Heavyweight	Philipe Lins	def.	Alex Nicholson	TKO (punches)	2	3:39
Preliminary card (Facebook Watch)
Heavyweight	Kelvin Tiller	def.	Jared Rosholt	Submission (guillotine choke)	2	0:54
Featherweight	Timur Valiev	def.	Bekbulat Magomedov	Decision (unanimous) (30-27, 30-27, 30-27)	3	5:00
Featherweight	Max Coga	def.	Marcos Galvao	TKO (punches)	3	2:19
Heavyweight	Josh Copeland	def.	Shawn Jordan	Decision (unanimous) (29-28, 29-28, 29-28)	3	5:00
Heavyweight	Valdrin Istrefi	def.	Daniel Gallemore	TKO (leg kicks)	2	1:42

== Standings After Event ==
The point system consists of outcome based scoring and bonuses for an early win. Under the outcome based scoring system, the winner of a fight receives 3 points and the loser receives 0 points. If the fight ends in a draw, both fighters will receive 1 point. The bonus for winning a fight in the first, second, or third round is 3 points, 2 points, and 1 point respectively. For example, if a fighter wins a fight in the first round, then the fighter will receive 6 total points. If a fighter misses weight, then the fighter that missed weight will receive 0 points and his opponent will receive 3 points due to a walkover victory.

=== Featherweight ===
Fighter	Wins	Draws	Losses	1st	2nd	3rd	Total Points (Note: The eight fighters with most points (green background) advance to the playoffs)
♛ Steven Siler	2	0	0	2	0	0	12
♛ Lance Palmer	2	0	0	0	1	1	9
♛ Andre Harrison	2	0	0	0	0	0	6
♛ Timur Valiev	2	0	0	0	0	0	6
♛ Alexandre Almeida	1	0	1	1	0	0	6
♛ Max Coga	1	0	1	0	0	1	4
♛ Nazareno Malegarie	1	0	1	0	0	0	3
Magomed Idrisov	0	0	2	0	0	0	0
Lee Coville	0	0	1	0	0	0	0
E Jumabieke Tuerxun	0	0	2	0	0	0	0
E Marcos Galvão	0	0	2	0	0	0	0
E Bekbulat Magomedov	0	0	2	0	0	0	0

=== Heavyweight ===
Fighter	Wins	Draws	Losses	1st	2nd	3rd	Total Points (Note: The eight fighters with most points (green background) advance to the playoffs)
♛ Francimar Barroso	2	0	0	2	0	0	12
♛ Kelvin Tiller	2	0	0	1	1	0	11
♛ Philipe Lins	2	0	0	0	1	0	8
♛ Jack May	1	0	1	1	0	0	6
♛ Alex Nicholson	1	0	1	0	1	0	5
♛ Valdrin Istrefi	1	0	1	0	1	0	5
♛ Jared Rosholt	1	0	1	0	0	0	3
Josh Copeland	1	0	1	0	0	0	3
Jake Heun	0	0	1	0	0	0	0
Caio Alencar	0	0	1	0	0	0	0
E Shawn Jordan	0	0	2	0	0	0	0
E } Daniel Gallemore	0	0	2	0	0	0	0

♛ = Clinched playoff spot --- E = Eliminated

== See also ==
- List of PFL events
- List of current PFL fighters
