= Daniel Gallemore =

American boxer and MMA fighter

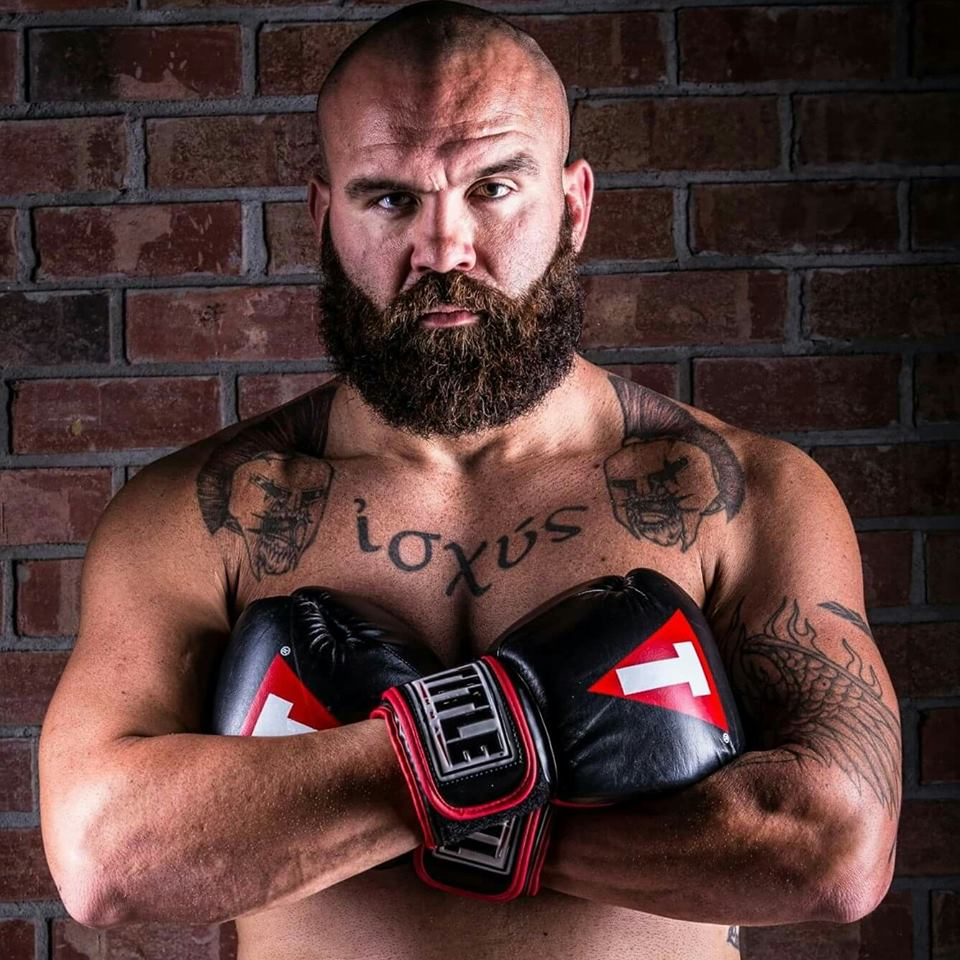
- Born: June 14, 1985 (age 41); Eskridge, Kansas, United States
- Other names: Big Kansas
- Height: 6 ft 5 in (1.96 m)
- Weight: 256.3 lb (116.3 kg; 18.31 st)
- Division: Heavyweight
- Reach: 77.0 in (196 cm)
- Stance: Orthodox
- Fighting out of: Emporia, Kansas, United States
- Team: Team Agoge; Palolo Boxing; Grudge Training Center (formerly)
- Rank: Black belt in American Jiu-Jitsu
- Years active: 2011–present

Mixed martial arts record
- Total: 13
- Wins: 7
- By knockout: 5
- By submission: 2
- Losses: 6
- By knockout: 5
- By decision: 1

Other information
- Mixed martial arts record from Sherdog

Daniel Gallemore (born June 14, 1985) is an American professional mixed martial artist and boxer. A professional competitor since 2011, Gallemore has formerly competed for the Professional Fighters League, Titan FC, and Bellator MMA.

== Background ==
Born and raised Eskridge, Kansas, Gallemore attended Mission Valley High School, and competed in wrestling and football. Gallemore began training in MMA after graduating high school to maintain and stay in shape.

== Mixed martial arts career ==
=== Early career ===
Gallemore compiled an amateur record of 12-3 and won the ISCF Amateur Championship before turning professional in 2011.

Gallemore faced undefeated Augusto Sakai at Bellator 139 on June 26, 2015.

Gallemore was scheduled to rematch Fredrick Brown on Bellator 150 on February 26, 2016, but Brown had to back out of the fight due to injury.

=== Professional Fighters League ===
Gallemore is scheduled to make his Professional Fighters League debut on November 2, 2017, in a heavyweight fight against Mike Kyle at PFL: Fight Night in Washington D.C.

== Mixed martial arts record ==
Professional record breakdown
13 matches	7 wins	6 losses
By knockout	5	5
By submission	2	0
By decision	0	1

Res.	Record	Opponent	Method	Event	Date	Round	Time	Location	Notes
Loss	7–6	Valdrin Istrefi	TKO (leg kicks)	PFL 4	July 19, 2018	2	1:42	Uniondale, New York, United States	
Loss	7–5	Francimar Barroso	TKO (doctor stoppage)	PFL 1	June 7, 2018	1	3:57	New York, New York, United States	
Loss	7–4	Mike Kyle	TKO (knees)	PFL: Fight Night	November 2, 2017	1	1:01	Washington, D.C., United States	
Win	7–3	Daniel James	Submission (guillotine choke)	Victory Fighting Championship 57	May 5, 2017	1	1:24	Topeka, Kansas, United States	Defended the Victory FC Heavyweight Championship.
Win	6–3	Derek Bohi	TKO (punches)	Victory Fighting Championship 55: Lindsey vs. Cochrane 2	December 23, 2016	1	1:34	Topeka, Kansas, United States	Defended the Victory FC Heavyweight Championship.
Win	5–3	Abe Wagner	Submission (guillotine choke)	Victory Fighting Championship 50	May 21, 2016	1	1:37	Topeka, Kansas, United States	Won the Victory FC Heavyweight Championship.
Loss	4–3	Augusto Sakai	TKO (retirement)	Bellator 139	June 26, 2015	2	5:00	Mulvane, Kansas, United States	
Win	4–2	Gzim Selmani	TKO (punches)	Bellator 130	October 24, 2014	2	4:33	Mulvane, Kansas, United States	
Win	3–2	Frederick Brown	TKO (elbows and punches)	Bellator 113	March 21, 2014	1	3:34	Mulvane, Kansas, United States	
Win	2–2	Benji Norris	KO	Danger-Fire Promotions: Season's Beatings	December 21, 2013	1	0:20	Topeka, Kansas, United States	
Loss	1–2	Rowland Bruce Redenbaugh	TKO (punches)	UFF 11	February 11, 2012	2	4:07	Wichita, Kansas, United States	
Win	1–1	Derrick Ruffin	TKO (retirement)	Bellator 56	October 29, 2011	2	5:00	Kansas City, Kansas, United States	
Loss	0–1	Alex Huddleston	Decision (unanimous)	Titan FC 19	July 29, 2011	3	5:00	Kansas City, Kansas, United States	

== Kickboxing and Muay Thai record (incomplete) ==
Professional kickboxing record
? wins, ? loss, ? draw
Date	Result	Opponent	Event	Location	Method	Round	Time	Record
2021-04-09	Win	Doug Holland	Lion Fight 65	Salina	TKO(Knees)	1	0:58	2-1
2019-11-09	Loss	Eric Lunsford	Xtreme Fight Night 363	Tulsa, Oklahoma	TKO	2	3:00	1-1
2019-11-09	Win	Rasheem Jones	Xtreme Fight Night 363	Tulsa, Oklahoma	KO(Punch)	2	3:00	1-0

== Professional boxing record ==
5 fights	5 wins	0 losses
By knockout	3	0
By decision	2	0

Result	Record	Opponent	Method	Date	Location	Notes
Win	5–0	(United States) Matthew Greer	Decision(unanimous)	13 Aug 2016	(United States) Kansas Expocentre, Topeka USA	
Win	4–0	(United States) John Turlington	Decision(unanimous)	05 Dec 2015	(United States) Kansas Expocentre, Topeka USA	
Win	3–0	(United States) Shane Grant	TKO	17 Oct 2015	(United States) Adam’s Mark Hotel, Kansas City USA	
Win	2–0	(United States) Dakota Talbott	TKO	20 Sep 2014	(United States) Topeka Event Center, Topeka USA	
Win	1–0	(United States) Mario Munoz	Decision(majority)	15 Oct 2011	(United States) Expocenter, Kansas City USA	
