= Marcos Galvão =

Brazilian mixed martial artist

- Born: Marcos Aurelio Galvão Pereira; 23 June 1982 (age 44); Manaus, Amazonas, Brazil
- Other names: Lôro
- Height: 5 ft 7 in (1.70 m)
- Weight: 145.5 lb (66.0 kg; 10.39 st)
- Division: Featherweight; Bantamweight
- Reach: 67 in (170 cm)
- Stance: Orthodox
- Fighting out of: Queens, New York, United States
- Team: Long Island MMA; Church Street Boxing
- Rank: Black belt in Brazilian Jiu-Jitsu under André Pederneiras
- Years active: 2003–present

Mixed martial arts record
- Total: 31
- Wins: 18
- By knockout: 4
- By submission: 1
- By decision: 13
- Losses: 12
- By knockout: 4
- By decision: 8
- Draws: 1

Other information
- Website: marcoslorobjj.com
- Mixed martial arts record from Sherdog
- Last updated on: 25 September 2010

Marcos Galvão (born 23 June 1982) is a Brazilian professional mixed martial artist currently competing in the Featherweight division of the Professional Fighters League. A professional competitor since 2003, Galvão peaked at a global ranking of No. 2 among Bantamweights in August 2007 and has also formerly competed for the WEC, Shooto, Jungle Fight, and Bellator, where he is the former Bantamweight World Champion. Galvao's nickname "Louro" means "blonde" in Portuguese, because he often dyes his hair this color.

== Background ==
Marcos Galvão was born and raised in the city of Manaus located in the state of Amazonas, Brazil. Marcos began practicing Judo when he was 11 years old before transitioning into Brazilian Jiu-Jitsu shortly after, training under Master Nonato Machado until moving to Rio de Janeiro at the age of 13. It was in Rio de Janeiro where Lôro started training heavily in Mixed Martial Arts and where he received his black belt in Brazilian Jiu-Jitsu from the hands of Nova União founder André Pederneiras who would be his coach for the most part of his career. It was under Dedé's guidance that Lôro started making a mark in the sports lower ranks, earning a few very important titles in the blue, purple and brown belt divisions, including an impressive world title at brown belt at the age of 16, being one of the youngest competitors to ever win the competition at the brown belt level. In 2003 Marcos was awarded his black belt, and shortly after he started pursuing a career in mixed martial arts. After a good start fighting in organizations like Shooto and traveling to Japan where he amounted wins that carried him to the WEC (considered at the time, the prime organization for MMA lighter weight competitors), Galvão hit a rough slope, and lost two fights in a row at the WEC. That was when his good friend Vítor Ribeiro invited Galvão to come to New York and start training with him, Lôro gladly accepted the offer and moved to the United States, where he trained full-time at Long Island MMA and also Church Street Boxing Gym with striking coach Jason Strout. Lôro thrived in this new environment that coupled with his determination, and dedication to the sport, earned him a Bellator Bantamweight Tournament win, after a few Grappler's Quest and NAGA competitions and wins, plus wins in Washington Combat and the New Jersey–based organization Ring of Combat, where he won the Featherweight championship title. After a few hurdles in his career, injuries, including facing-off against one of his teammates, and deciding to change teams due to training difficulties, Lôro defeated Joe Warren and earned the Bellator Bantamweight title.

== Mixed martial arts career ==
=== Shooto ===
Galvao made his professional debut in 2003 for the Japanese Shooto organization, where he competed primarily, compiling a record of 6–1 before being signed by the WEC.

=== WEC ===
Galvão made his WEC and U.S. debut at WEC 31 against Brian Bowles. Galvão lost the fight via KO in the second round, and then took a fight outside of the WEC before returning to the promotion. He returned to suffer another KO loss, this time to Damacio Page at WEC 39.

=== Shooto Title Fight ===
Following a loss in his WEC debut to Bowles, Galvão returned to Japan to challenge the undefeated Shooto Bantamweight Champion Masakatsu Ueda. The fight ended in a draw, resulting in Ueda retaining the title.

=== Bellator MMA ===
Galvão was a part of the main event for Bellator 41 against Joe Warren, the Bellator Featherweight Champion. The fight was contested at a Catchweight of 137 lbs. In the fight Galvão negated a majority of Warren's offense for the first two rounds by showing strong takedown defense, taking down Warren multiple times, taking Warren's back, and executing good knees from the clinch. In the third round he was taken down by Warren and controlled throughout the round. At the end of the fight, Bellator color commentator, Jimmy Smith, believed Galvão won the fight 29–28. Along with Smith, many top MMA sites, (MMAJunkie, Sherdog, MMAFighting, MMASpot), all believed that Galvão won the fight by 29–28. It was then announced that Warren had won the fight via unanimous decision (30–27, 29–28, 29–28).

During an MMAJunkie radio interview with Bellator CEO, Bjorn Rebney, Rebney confirmed that Galvão will take part in the Bellator Season Five Bantamweight Tournament. Galvao fought former WEC Bantamweight Champion Chase Beebe in a quarterfinal match-up on 24 September 2011 and won via split decision. In the semifinals, Galvão lost a very close fight against Cuban Alexis Vila at Bellator 55, losing by split decision (29–28, 29–28, 27–30). Though Galvao lost the fight, he still received his win bonus.

Galvão returned for the Bellator Season Six Bantamweight Tournament. He won his quarterfinal and semifinal fights against Ed West and Travis Marx respectively before reaching the finals. It was there that he scored a second round TKO against Luis Nogueira to win the tournament.

His next fight was against his good friend and teammate Eduardo Dantas for the Bellator Bantamweight Championship. He lost via knockout in the second round.

In his next bout for the promotion, Galvão faced Tom McKenna at Bellator 108. Galvão defeated McKenna in the second round due to strikes.

Galvão then faced Thomas Vasquez at Bellator 118 on 2 May 2014. Galvão used takedowns and ground-and-pound to defeat Vasquez via unanimous decision.

Galvão challenged Joe Warren for the Bellator Bantamweight Championship in a rematch on 27 March 2015 at Bellator 135. He won the fight via verbal submission in the second round after Warren screamed out in pain causing the referee to stop the fight. This marked the first submission win of Galvão's career and avenged his previous loss to Warren.

Galvão was scheduled to face former teammate Eduardo Dantas in a rematch for the Bellator Bantamweight Championship title at Bellator 150, but the match was scrapped following a last-minute illness suffered by Galvao. Prior, the rematch was expected to take place at Bellator 144, however, this was cancelled, after an injury to Dantas. The rematch eventually took place on 17 June 2016 at Bellator 156. Galvão lost the match by unanimous decision.

Following the loss of his title, Galvão defeated L.C. Davis via split decision at Bellator 166 on 2 December 2016.

Moving up to the featherweight division, Galvão faced Emmanuel Sanchez at Bellator 175 on 31 March 2017. He lost the fight via unanimous decision.

Again fighting at featherweight, Galvão returned at Bellator 189 on 1 December 2017 against UFC veteran, Sam Sicilia. He lost the fight via unanimous decision.

Galvao's Bellator contract expired in February 2018 and he became a free agent.

=== PFL ===
Following his departure from Bellator, Galvao signed with the Professional Fighters League. He faced Nazareno Malegarie at PFL 1 on 7 June 2018. He lost the fight by unanimous decision.

Galvao faced Max Coga at PFL 4 on 19 July 2018. He lost the fight by a third-round technical knockout.

Galvao faced Elvis Silva at Shooto Brazil 91 on 5 April 2019. He lost the fight by unanimous decision.

== Championships and accomplishments ==
- Bellator MMA
  - Bellator Bantamweight World Championship (One time)
  - Bellator Season Six Bantamweight Tournament Winner
- MMA Junkie
  - 2015 #5 Ranked Submission of the Year vs. Joe Warren at Bellator 135
  - 2015 March Submission of the Month vs. Joe Warren

== Mixed martial arts record ==
Professional record breakdown
31 matches	18 wins	12 losses
By knockout	4	4
By submission	1	0
By decision	13	8
Draws	1	

Res.	Record	Opponent	Method	Event	Date	Round	Time	Location	Notes
Loss	18–12–1	Elvis Silva	Decision (unanimous)	Shooto Brazil 91	5 April 2019	3	5:00	Rio de Janeiro, Brazil	
Loss	18–11–1	Max Coga	TKO (punches)	PFL 4	19 July 2018	3	2:19	Uniondale, New York, United States	
Loss	18–10–1	Nazareno Malegarie	Decision (Unanimous)	PFL 1	7 June 2018	3	5:00	New York City, New York, United States	
Loss	18–9–1	Sam Sicilia	Decision (unanimous)	Bellator 189	1 December 2017	3	5:00	Thackerville, Oklahoma, United States	
Loss	18–8–1	Emmanuel Sanchez	Decision (unanimous)	Bellator 175	31 March 2017	3	5:00	Rosemont, Illinois, United States	Return to Featherweight.
Win	18–7–1	LC Davis	Decision (split)	Bellator 166	2 December 2016	3	5:00	Thackerville, Oklahoma, United States	
Loss	17–7–1	Eduardo Dantas	Decision (unanimous)	Bellator 156	17 June 2016	5	5:00	Fresno, California, United States	Lost the Bellator Bantamweight World Championship.
Win	17–6–1	Joe Warren	Verbal Submission (kneebar)	Bellator 135	27 March 2015	2	0:45	Thackerville, Oklahoma, United States	Won the Bellator Bantamweight World Championship.
Win	16–6–1	Thomas Vasquez	Decision (unanimous)	Bellator 118	2 May 2014	3	5:00	Atlantic City, New Jersey, United States	
Win	15–6–1	Tom McKenna	TKO (punches)	Bellator 108	15 November 2013	1	4:29	Atlantic City, New Jersey, United States	
Win	14–6–1	Shely Santana	TKO (punches)	Shooto Brazil: Manaus	28 June 2013	2	2:00	Manaus, Brazil	
Loss	13–6–1	Eduardo Dantas	KO (punches)	Bellator 89	14 February 2013	2	3:01	Charlotte, North Carolina, United States	For the Bellator Bantamweight World Championship.
Win	13–5–1	Luis Nogueira	TKO (elbows)	Bellator 73	24 August 2012	2	4:20	Tunica, Mississippi, United States	Won the Bellator Season Six Bantamweight Tournament.
Win	12–5–1	Travis Marx	Decision (unanimous)	Bellator 68	11 May 2012	3	5:00	Atlantic City, New Jersey, United States	Bellator Season Six Bantamweight Tournament Semifinal.
Win	11–5–1	Ed West	Decision (unanimous)	Bellator 65	13 April 2012	3	5:00	Atlantic City, New Jersey, United States	Bellator Season Six Bantamweight Tournament Quarterfinal.
Loss	10–5–1	Alexis Vila	Decision (split)	Bellator 55	22 October 2011	3	5:00	Yuma, Arizona, United States	Bellator Season Five Bantamweight Tournament Semifinal.
Win	10–4–1	Chase Beebe	Decision (split)	Bellator 51	24 September 2011	3	5:00	Canton, Ohio, United States	Bellator Season Five Bantamweight Tournament Quarterfinal.
Loss	9–4–1	Joe Warren	Decision (unanimous)	Bellator 41	16 April 2011	3	5:00	Yuma, Arizona, United States	Catchweight (137 lbs) bout.
Win	9–3–1	Ryan Vaccaro	Decision (unanimous)	Ring of Combat 33	3 December 2010	3	5:00	Atlantic City, New Jersey, United States	
Win	8–3–1	Jacob Kirwan	Decision (unanimous)	Ring of Combat 31	24 September 2010	3	4:00	Atlantic City, New Jersey, United States	
Win	7–3–1	David Derby	TKO (punches)	Washington Combat: Battle of the Legends	15 May 2010	1	1:37	Washington, District of Columbia, United States	Bantamweight debut.
Loss	6–3–1	Damacio Page	KO (punches)	WEC 39	1 March 2009	1	0:18	Corpus Christi, Texas, United States	
Draw	6–2–1	Masakatsu Ueda	Draw	Shooto: Shooto Tradition 3	28 September 2008	3	5:00	Tokyo, Japan	For the Shooto Featherweight (132 lbs.) Championship.
Loss	6–2	Brian Bowles	KO (punch)	WEC 31	12 December 2007	2	2:09	Las Vegas, Nevada, United States	
Win	6–1	Kenji Osawa	Decision (majority)	Shooto: Back To Our Roots 3	18 May 2007	3	5:00	Tokyo, Japan	
Win	5–1	Naoya Uematsu	Decision (unanimous)	Fury FC 1: Warlords Unleashed	27 September 2006	3	5:00	São Paulo, Brazil	
Win	4–1	Fredson Paixão	Decision (unanimous)	Jungle Fight 6	29 April 2006	3	5:00	Manaus, Brazil	
Loss	3–1	Akitoshi Hokazono	Decision (unanimous)	Shooto: 9/23 in Korakuen Hall	23 September 2005	3	5:00	Tokyo, Japan	
Win	3–0	Jin Akimoto	Decision (unanimous)	Shooto: 9/26 in Kourakuen Hall	26 September 2004	3	5:00	Tokyo, Japan	
Win	2–0	Shuichiro Katsumura	Decision (unanimous)	Shooto 2004: 1/24 in Korakuen Hall	24 January 2004	3	5:00	Tokyo, Japan	
Win	1–0	Masato Shiozawa	Decision (majority)	Shooto: 5/4 in Korakuen Hall	4 May 2003	3	5:00	Tokyo, Japan	

== Personal ==
Galvão is married to his wife Paula. The couple currently reside in California where Galvão trains and teaches Brazilian Jiu-Jitsu and Mixed Martial Arts.
