= Valdrin Istrefi =

Macedonian-Liechtensteiner mixed martial artist (born 1991)

- Born: March 3, 1991 (age 35); Struga, SR Macedonia, Yugoslavia
- Native name: Валдрин Истрефи
- Other names: The Beast
- Nationality: Macedonian, Liechtensteiner
- Height: 6 ft 3 in (1.91 m)
- Weight: 244 lb (111 kg; 17 st 6 lb)
- Division: Heavyweight (2013–present)
- Reach: 80 in (203 cm)
- Fighting out of: St. Gallen, Switzerland
- Team: Planet Eater
- Years active: 2013–present

Mixed martial arts record
- Total: 21
- Wins: 15
- By knockout: 9
- By submission: 4
- By decision: 2
- Losses: 6
- By knockout: 3
- By decision: 3

Other information
- Mixed martial arts record from Sherdog

Valdrin Istrefi (Macedonian: Валдрин Истрефи; born March 3, 1991) is a Macedonian-Liechtensteiner professional mixed martial artist. He currently competes in the Heavyweight division. He is a former Westside Fighting Challenge and Cage Fight Series Heavyweight Champion. He has previously competed on Brave CF, and Professional Fighters League (PFL).

== Professional career ==
=== Early career ===
Istrefi made his professional debut on May 18, 2013, against Thorsten Thiel. Istrefi won the fight via a second-round submission.

=== Westside Fighting Challenge ===
After accumulating a career record of 10–1, Istrefi made his debut under Austrian federation Westside Fighting Challenge on November 26, 2016, against Marko Igrc. Istrefi won the fight via a second-round TKO.

==== Westside Fighting Challenge Heavyweight Champion ====
Istrefi faced Evgeny Bova on November 25, 2017, for the vacant Westside Fighting Challenge Heavyweight Championship. Istrefi won the fight via a Unanimous Decision, winning his first career championship.

=== Professional Fighters League ===
Istrefi made his debut under Professional Fighters League (PFL) on June 7, 2018, against Jared Rosholt at PFL 1 (2018). Istrefi lost the fight via a Unanimous Decision.

His next fight came on July 19, 2018, against Daniel Gallemore at PFL 4 (2018). Istrefi won the fight via a second-round TKO.

His next fight came on June 6, 2019, against Ali Isaev at PFL 3 (2019). Istrefi lost the fight via a Unanimous Decision.

His final fight with the federation came on August 8, 2019, against Muhammed Dereese at PFL 6 (2019). Istrefi lost the fight via a first-round TKO.

=== Cage Fight Series Heavyweight Champion ===
Following a four-year layoff, Istrefi returned to action on November 10, 2023, where he faced Nicolas Đurđević for the vacant Cage Fight Series Heavyweight Championship. Istrefi won the fight via a third-round TKO, winning his second career championship.

=== Brave Combat Federation ===
Istrefi made his debut under Brave Combat Federation on April 20, 2024, against Pavel Dailidko. Istrefi lost the fight via a second-round TKO.

=== Return to Westside Fighting Challenge ===
Istrefi returned to Westside Fighting Challenge on September 7, 2024, where he defended his Westside Fighting Challenge Heavyweight Championship for the first time since winning it seven years prior. He defended his championship against Daniel Dörrer. Istrefi won the fight via a first-round TKO.

=== Fight Nation Championship ===
Istrefi was scheduled to face Quentin Domingos in his Fight Nation Championship debut on November 29, 2025, however the fight was cancelled after Domingos suffered an injury during warmups.

His debut finally came a year and a half after his last bout on April 11, 2026, against Michał Andryszak. Istrefi lost the fight via a first-round TKO.

== Championships and accomplishments ==
=== Mixed martial arts ===
- Westside Fighting Challenge
  - WSFC Heavyweight Champion (One time)
    - One successful title defense
- Cage Fight Series
  - Cage Fight Series Heavyweight Champion (One time; former)

== Mixed martial arts record ==
Professional record breakdown
21 matches	15 wins	6 losses
By knockout	9	3
By submission	4	0
By decision	2	3

Res.	Record	Opponent	Method	Event	Date	Round	Time	Location	Notes
Loss	15–6	Michał Andryszak	TKO (punches)	Fight Nation Championship 29	April 11, 2026	1	2:35	Ljubljana, Slovenia	
Win	15–5	Daniel Dörrer	TKO (punches)	Westside Fighting Challenge 7	September 7, 2024	1	1:00	Hohenems, Austria	Retained the WSFC Heavyweight Championship.
Loss	14–5	Pavel Dailidko	TKO (elbows and punches)	Brave CF 81	April 20, 2024	2	1:37	Ljubljana, Slovenia	
Win	14–4	Nicolas Đurđević	TKO (punches)	Cage Fight Series 14	November 10, 2023	3	2:11	Graz, Austria	Won the vacant Cage Fight Series Heavyweight Championship.
Loss	13–4	Muhammed Dereese	TKO (punches)	PFL 6 (2019)	August 8, 2019	1	2:06	Atlantic City, New Jersey, United States	
Loss	13–3	Ali Isaev	Decision (unanimous)	PFL 3 (2019)	June 6, 2019	3	5:00	Uniondale, New York, United States	
Win	13–2	Daniel Gallemore	TKO (leg kicks)	PFL 4 (2018)	July 19, 2018	2	1:42	Uniondale, New York, United States	
Loss	12–2	Jared Rosholt	Decision (unanimous)	PFL 1 (2018)	June 7, 2018	3	5:00	New York City, New York, United States	
Win	12–1	Evgeny Bova	Decision (unanimous)	Westside Fighting Challenge 5	November 25, 2017	3	5:00	Dornbirn, Austria	Won the vacant WSFC Heavyweight Championship.
Win	11–1	Marko Igrc	TKO (punches)	Westside Fighting Challenge 4	November 26, 2016	2	2:38	Dornbirn, Austria	
Win	10–1	Vladimir Shemarov	TKO (strikes)	Swiss Las Vegas Fusion 2016	June 18, 2016	2	3:06	Basel, Switzerland	
Win	9–1	Stefan Traunmuller	Decision (unanimous)	Aggrelin 10	February 20, 2016	3	5:00	Munich, Germany	
Win	8–1	Frank Kortz	TKO (strikes)	Swiss Las Vegas Fusion	December 5, 2015	1	4:59	Spreitenbach, Switzerland	
Loss	7–1	Björn Schmiedeberg	Decision (unanimous)	German MMA Championship 6	April 18, 2015	3	5:00	Castrop-Rauxel, Germany	
Win	7–0	Daniel Weissenboeck	TKO (punches)	Liechtensteiner Benefit Fight Night 2014	December 6, 2014	1	1:10	Vaduz, Liechtenstein	
Win	6–0	Viktor Daniel	Submission (americana)	Age Of Cage 2: Return Of The Cage	July 19, 2014	2	4:21	Stuttgart, Germany	
Win	5–0	Jürgen Dolch	Submission (forearm choke)	Liechtensteiner Fight Night 2014	April 5, 2014	1	2:58	Vaduz, Liechtenstein	
Win	4–0	Christian Danner	Submission (guillotine choke)	Cage XFC: Salzburger MMA Challenge	November 9, 2013	1	0:46	Wals-Siezenheim, Austria	
Win	3–0	Lars Rauchbach	TKO (punches)	FFC: Cage Fight Night 2	October 13, 2013	1	4:13	Köthen, Germany	
Win	2–0	Alden Hadžić	Submission (armbar)	BBO Fight Night	September 7, 2013	1	N/A	Austria	
Win	1–0	Thorsten Thiel	Submission (rear-naked choke)	Shooto Germany: Stuttgart	May 18, 2013	2	1:09	Stuttgart, Germany	Heavyweight debut.

== See also ==
- List of male mixed martial artists
