= Nazareno Malegarie =

Argentine martial artist

- Born: May 16, 1986 (age 40); Arrecifes, Argentina
- Other names: El Tigre
- Height: 5 ft 8 in (1.73 m)
- Weight: 145 lb (66 kg; 10.4 st)
- Division: Lightweight; Featherweight; Bantamweight
- Reach: 70.0 in (178 cm)
- Fighting out of: Buenos Aires, Argentina
- Team: Ataque Duplo
- Rank: Black belt in Brazilian Jiu-Jitsu; Black belt in Judo; Black belt in Luta Livre Esportiva
- Years active: 2007-present

Mixed martial arts record
- Total: 41
- Wins: 34
- By knockout: 9
- By submission: 18
- By decision: 7
- Losses: 6
- By decision: 6
- Draws: 1

Other information
- Mixed martial arts record from Sherdog

Nazareno Malegarie (born May 16, 1986) is an Argentine mixed martial artist, and a two-time BJJ World Champion currently competing in the Featherweight division of the Professional Fighters League. A professional MMA competitor since 2007, he has also competed for the UFC, Bellator and Pancrase.

== Background ==
Malegarie grew up in Buenos Aires, Argentina where he began learning Judo when he was only four-years-old and later Tae kwon do at the age of seven.

He was Judo Champion in Argentina in 1999 and 2000.

== Brazilian Jiu-Jitsu ==
In 2001, after his family moved to Brazil, he started training in Brazilian Jiu-Jitsu, winning the 2003 and 2004 Brazilian jiu-jitsu World Championships in the blue belt division, South American and state tournaments. In BJJ he holds a notable victory over the four time BJJ World Champion and UFC fighter Gilbert "Durinho" Burns. After earning his blackbelt he made the leap into mixed martial arts, when he began training alongside UFC veteran Thiago Tavares, who inspired him to consider a career in MMA.

== Mixed martial arts career ==
=== Early career ===
Malergarie currently trains at the Ataque Duplo Gym in Brazil. After his MMA debut in 2007, Nazareno fought in many MMA organizations in Brazil and Puerto Rico, where he finished 17 of his 19 victories by knockout or submission as a professional.

=== Bellator MMA ===
At Bellator 37, Malegarie fought Daniel Mason-Straus in the quarter-finals of the Bellator Season Four Featherweight Tournament. Despite a noble effort, fighting a war for three rounds, Straus received the unanimous decision, eliminating Malegarie from the tournament and giving him his first career loss.

After his loss to Straus, Malergarie went back to the gym to work on his wrestling techniques for a possible rematch. His improved wrestling and ground skills showed during his fight with Jacob DeVree at Bellator 46, which he won by third round submission.

Malegarie competed in the opening round of the Bellator season seven featherweight tournament. He faced Rad Martinez in the quarter-finals at Bellator 76 and lost via unanimous decision.

=== The Ultimate Fighter: Brazil ===
Malegarie participated in The Ultimate Fighter: Brazil 4. He entered the house by defeating Edson Pereira via unanimous decision. In the semi-finals, Malegarie lost to Fernando Bruno by unanimous decision.

=== Ultimate Fighting Championship ===
Malegarie made his promotional debut on September 5, 2015, at UFC 191 against fellow TUF Brazil competitor Joaquim Silva. He lost the fight via split decision.

== Grappling career ==
- Two-time Brazilian Jiu-Jitsu World Champion
  - 2003
  - 2004: blue belt, featherweight
- South American Brazilian Jiu-Jitsu Champion (2006 or 2007)
- Two-time Argentinean Judo Champion (1999–2000)

== Mixed martial arts record ==
Professional record breakdown
| 40 matches | 34 wins | 5 losses |
| By knockout | 9 | 0 |
| By submission | 18 | 0 |
| By decision | 7 | 5 |
| Draws | 1 | |

| Res. | Record | Opponent | Method | Event | Date | Round | Time | Location | Notes |
|---|---|---|---|---|---|---|---|---|---|
| Loss | 34–6–1 | Isao Kobayashi | Decision (unanimous) | Pancrase: 305 | May 26, 2019 | 5 | 5:00 | Tokyo, Japan | Lost the Pancrase Featherweight Championship. |
| Draw | 34–5–1 | Steven Siler | Draw (majority) | PFL 8 (2018) | October 5, 2018 | 2 | 5:00 | New Orleans, Louisiana, United States | 2018 PFL Featherweight Quarterfinal bout. Eliminated via first round tiebreaker. |
| Loss | 34–5 | Andre Harrison | Decision (unanimous) | PFL 4 (2018) | July 19, 2018 | 3 | 5:00 | Uniondale, New York, United States | |
| Win | 34–4 | Marcos Galvão | Decision (unanimous) | PFL 1 (2018) | June 7, 2018 | 3 | 5:00 | New York City, New York, United States | |
| Win | 33–4 | Issei Tamura | Submission (rear-naked choke) | Pancrase: 285 | March 12, 2017 | 1 | 2:50 | Tokyo, Japan | Won the interim Pancrase Featherweight Championship. Later promoted to undisputed champion. |
| Win | 32–4 | Jose Carlos Soares | Decision (unanimous) | SMASH Fight 4 | October 28, 2016 | 3 | 5:00 | Curitiba, Brazil | Defended SMASH Fight Featherweight Championship. |
| Win | 31–4 | Guy Delumeau | Decision (unanimous) | Pancrase: 281 | October 2, 2016 | 3 | 5:00 | Tokyo, Japan | |
| Win | 30–4 | Hiroyuki Takaya | Decision (unanimous) | Pancrase: 278 | June 12, 2016 | 3 | 5:00 | Tokyo, Japan | |
| Win | 29–4 | Iramar Frota | Technical Submission (guillotine choke) | Aspera Fighting Championship 34 | April 16, 2016 | 1 | 0:34 | Ceará, Brazil | |
| Loss | 28–4 | Joaquim Silva | Decision (split) | UFC 191 | September 5, 2015 | 3 | 5:00 | Las Vegas, Nevada, United States | Lightweight bout. |
| Win | 28–3 | Derinaldo Guerra | Submission (arm-triangle choke) | Arena Tour | March 22, 2014 | 1 | 2:50 | Buenos Aires, Argentina | Return to Featherweight. |
| Win | 27–3 | Vitor Pastoriza | Submission (standing guillotine) | Arena Tour | December 7, 2013 | 1 | 0:24 | Buenos Aires, Argentina | |
| Win | 26–3 | Andre Luis de Souza | Submission (guillotine choke) | Smash: Smash Fight | May 3, 2013 | 1 | 2:27 | Curitiba, Brazil | Bantamweight debut. |
| Win | 25–3 | José Ivanildo | Decision (unanimous) | Sao Jose Super Fight 3 | April 13, 2013 | 3 | 5:00 | São José, Brazil | |
| Win | 24–3 | Moisés Monteiro | TKO (punches) | Tavares Combat 5 | February 16, 2013 | 1 | 00:34 | Jaguaruna, Brazil | |
| Win | 23–3 | Marcelo Alalau | KO (head kick) | Tavares Combat 4 | February 3, 2013 | 1 | 0:17 | Antônio Carlos, Brazil | |
| Loss | 22–3 | Rad Martinez | Decision (unanimous) | Bellator 76 | October 12, 2012 | 3 | 5:00 | Windsor, Ontario, Canada | Bellator Season Seven Featherweight Tournament Quarterfinal. |
| Win | 22–2 | Thiago Sinistro | TKO (punches) | IMMAF: Imbituba MMA Fight 2012 | June 23, 2012 | 1 | 1:44 | Imbituba, Brazil | |
| Win | 21–2 | Jonas Lis | TKO (punches) | Insano Empalux: Grand Prix | March 2, 2012 | 1 | 0:14 | São José, Brazil | |
| Loss | 20–2 | Marlon Sandro | Decision (unanimous) | Bellator 47 | July 23, 2011 | 3 | 5:00 | Rama, Ontario, Canada | Bellator Summer Series Featherweight Tournament Semifinal. |
| Win | 20–1 | Jacob DeVree | Submission (guillotine choke) | Bellator 46 | June 25, 2011 | 3 | 1:25 | Hollywood, Florida, United States | Bellator Summer Series Featherweight Tournament Quarterfinal. |
| Loss | 19–1 | Daniel Mason-Straus | Decision (unanimous) | Bellator 37 | March 19, 2011 | 3 | 5:00 | Hollywood, Florida, United States | Bellator Season 4 Featherweight Tournament Quarterfinal. |
| Win | 19–0 | Nelson Velasques | Submission (rear-naked choke) | Colizeu Fight Championship | November 20, 2010 | 1 | 4:48 | Joaçaba, Brazil | |
| Win | 18–0 | Antonuce Conceicao | Submission (guillotine choke) | Memorial Fight Qualifying | June 4, 2010 | 1 | N/A | São Paulo, Brazil | |
| Win | 17–0 | Ricardo Urbano | TKO (punches) | K.O. Fight 3 | April 10, 2010 | 2 | 2:10 | Apucarana, Brazil | |
| Win | 16–0 | Daniel Morales | Decision (unanimous) | Top Combat Championship 2 | March 5, 2010 | 3 | 5:00 | San Juan, Puerto Rico | |
| Win | 15–0 | Erick Carlos Silva | Submission (anaconda choke) | Nitrix Show Fight 4 | February 6, 2010 | 1 | 4:07 | Balneário Camboriú, Brazil | |
| Win | 14–0 | Erickson Lima | Submission (kimura) | Jaragua Fight Combat | December 4, 2009 | 1 | 2:40 | Jaraguá do Sul, Brazil | |
| Win | 13–0 | Luciano Oliveira | Submission (heel hook) | Nitrix Show Fight 3 | November 4, 2009 | 1 | N/A | Itajaí, Brazil | |
| Win | 12–0 | Alessandro Corderio | Submission (arm-triangle choke) | VIP Stage 4 | October 24, 2009 | 3 | 1:32 | Joinville, Brazil | |
| Win | 11–0 | Rafael Rodrigues | Submission (heel hook) | Jungle Fight 15 | September 19, 2009 | 3 | 1:51 | São Paulo, Brazil | |
| Win | 10–0 | Vitor de Miranda | KO (punches) | Tavares Combat Qualifiers | August 15, 2009 | 1 | 0:54 | Florianópolis, Brazil | |
| Win | 9–0 | Rosenildo Rocha | Submission (rear-naked choke) | VIP Stage 3 | May 2, 2009 | 2 | N/A | Joinville, Brazil | |
| Win | 8–0 | John Paine | KO (punches) | Spartan 1 | January 10, 2009 | 2 | 2:58 | Itapema, Brazil | |
| Win | 7–0 | William Wolverine | TKO (punches) | Balneario Camboriu Fight | December 1, 2008 | 1 | 4:34 | Balneário Camboriú, Brazil | |
| Win | 6–0 | Diego Marlon | Submission (guillotine choke) | Warrior's Challenge 3 | October 11, 2008 | 1 | N/A | Itapema, Brazil | |
| Win | 5–0 | Ruan Castil | Submission (keylock) | Dukeoom of Asgar | October 1, 2008 | 1 | 2:13 | Florianópolis, Brazil | |
| Win | 4–0 | Pablo Vinicius | TKO (injury) | Dukeoom of Asgar | October 1, 2008 | 1 | 1:19 | Florianópolis, Brazil | |
| Win | 3–0 | Jairon Oliveira | Decision (unanimous) | Floripa Fight 4 | March 29, 2008 | 3 | 5:00 | Florianópolis, Brazil | |
| Win | 2–0 | Jonas Ribeiro | Submission (guillotine choke) | Full Fight Open Vale Tudo | August 11, 2007 | 1 | 0:55 | Brazil | |
| Win | 1–0 | Tarcisio Imegiato | Submission (arm-triangle choke) | Full Fight Open Vale Tudo | August 11, 2007 | 1 | 0:36 | Brazil | |
