= Francimar Barroso =

Brazilian martial artist (born 1980)

- Born: 29 February 1980 (age 46); Xapuri, Brazil
- Other names: Bodão
- Nationality: Brazilian
- Height: 6 ft 1 in (1.85 m)
- Weight: 239 lb (108 kg; 17 st 1 lb)
- Division: Heavyweight; Light Heavyweight
- Reach: 75.0 in (191 cm)
- Fighting out of: Las Vegas, Nevada, United States
- Team: Nova União (formerly); Xtreme Couture (2018–present)
- Rank: Black belt in Brazilian Jiu-Jitsu; Black belt in Kickboxing
- Years active: 2004–present

Mixed martial arts record
- Total: 37
- Wins: 27
- By knockout: 12
- By submission: 5
- By decision: 10
- Losses: 8
- By knockout: 3
- By submission: 1
- By decision: 4
- Draws: 1
- No contests: 1

Other information
- Mixed martial arts record from Sherdog
- Last updated on: 22 November 2016

Francimar Barroso (born 29 February 1980) is a Brazilian mixed martial artist currently competing in the Heavyweight division. A professional competitor since 2004, he has also competed for the UFC, Shooto, and Professional Fighters League.

== Mixed martial arts career ==
=== Brazilian circuit ===
On 12 April 2013, he faced Brazilian prospect Simao Melo da Silva for the WOCS Light Heavyweight Championship. Barroso won the fight via rear-naked choke. He vacated the title shortly after the fight, after getting called from the UFC to be a late-fight replacement.

=== Shooto Brazil ===
Towards the beginning of his career, Barroso competed at Shooto Brazil 11 on 28 March 2009, against Roque Oliver. He won by submission (rear-naked choke). Shortly after the fight he was signed to a four-fight contract. He fought at the next event as well, fighting Levi da Costa on 30 May 2009. He won the fight by doctor stoppage.

After a long hiatus, Barroso returned on 10 March 2012, when he faced Falco Neto Lopes at Shooto Brazil 28. Barroso won via guillotine choke. On 23 November 2012, Barroso fought for the vacant Shooto Brazil Light Heavyweight championship, as he faced number one contender Cristiano Souza. Barroso won the fight by doctor stoppage to win the championship. However he vacated the title, little over a year later to fight in the UFC.

=== Desert Force Championship ===
In November 2010, Barroso signed with upstart Jordan promotion Desert Force Championship (DFC). He made his DFC debut on 8 December 2010, against Abhijeet Petkar. Barroso won via head kick KO. Then on 19 May 2011, he faced Russian prospect Baga Agaev at DFC 2. He lost the fight when Agaev landed a blistering punch that knocked Barroso down, and then landed multiple knees before the referee stepped in to stop the fight.

=== Ultimate Fighting Championship ===
Barroso made his UFC debut on 3 August 2013, when he faced fellow Brazilian Ednaldo Oliveira, after Oliveira's original opponent Robert Drysdale was forced out of the bout due to injury. Barroso won via unanimous decision.

Barroso faced UFC newcomer Hans Stringer at UFC Fight Night 38 on 23 March 2014. He lost the back-and-forth fight via split decision.

Barroso was expected to face Patrick Cummins at UFC Fight Night: Henderson vs. Khabilov on 7 June 2014. However, Barroso was forced to pull out of the bout due to injury.

Barroso was expected to face Ovince St. Preux on 8 November 2014 at UFC Fight Night 56, replacing Rafael Cavalcante. In turn, this fight was scrapped when St. Preux was tabbed as a replacement in the event headliner.

Barroso faced Ryan Jimmo on 30 May 2015 at UFC Fight Night 67. He won the fight by unanimous decision.

Barroso was expected to face promotional newcomer Abdul-Kerim Edilov on 17 January 2016 at UFC Fight Night 81. However, Edilov pulled out of the fight in the days leading up to the event citing a knee injury and was replaced by fellow newcomer Elvis Mutapčić. Barroso won the fight via unanimous decision.

Barroso faced Nikita Krylov on 8 May 2016 at UFC Fight Night 87. He lost the fight via submission in the second round.

Barroso was expected to face C. B. Dollaway on 10 September 2016 at UFC 203. On the day of the event, Dollaway suffered a back injury at his hotel due to a malfunctioning elevator and was unable to participate. As a result, Barroso was also removed from the event.

Barroso faced promotional newcomer Darren Stewart on 19 November 2016 at UFC Fight Night 100. He lost the bout via TKO in the first round, as he was dazed by an inadvertent headbutt which went unnoticed by the referee and preceded the TKO stoppage. Eventually the result was overturned to "No Contest" by the Comissão Atlética Brasileira de MMA (CABMMA).

A rematch with Stewart took place on 18 March 2017 at UFC Fight Night 107. Barroso won the fight by unanimous decision.

Barroso faced promotional newcomer Aleksandar Rakić on 2 September 2017 at UFC Fight Night 115. He lost the fight by unanimous decision.

Barroso faced Gian Villante on 20 January 2018 at UFC 220. He lost via split decision .

== Personal life ==
In 2016 he proposed to his girlfriend Milenna Tonnera with whom he lived together for more than two years at the moment just after the fight. Barroso has a son and a daughter.

In 2021 he married Anastasia Motyashova and moved to Moscow.

== Championships and accomplishments ==
- WOCS
  - WOCS Light Heavyweight Champion (One time; vacated)
- Shooto Brazil
  - Shooto Brazil Light Heavyweight Championship (One time; vacated)

== Mixed martial arts record ==
Professional record breakdown
37 matches	27 wins	8 losses
By knockout	12	3
By submission	5	1
By decision	10	4
Draws	1	
No contests	1	

Res.	Record	Opponent	Method	Event	Date	Round	Time	Location	Notes
Loss	27–8–1 (1)	Dmitriy Andryushko	Decision (split)	MMA Series 95	September 5, 2026	5	5:00	Moscow, Russia	For the MMA Series Heavyweight Championship.
Win	27–7–1 (1)	Sergey Sengeim	Decision (split)	MMA Series 94	30 May 2026	3	5:00	Moscow, Russia	
Win	26–7–1 (1)	Dmitriy Vezhenko	TKO (punches and elbows)	MMA Series 81	11 June 2024	2	4:50	Moscow, Russia	
Win	25–7–1 (1)	Alex Nicholson	Decision (unanimous)	PFL 9 (2019)	31 October 2019	2	5:00	Las Vegas, Nevada, United States	2019 PFL Heavyweight Tournament Quarterfinal. Advanced to semifinal but deemed medically unable to continue.
Win	24–7–1 (1)	Ben Edwards	Decision (unanimous)	PFL 6 (2019)	8 August 2019	3	5:00	Atlantic City, New Jersey, United States	
Win	23–7–1 (1)	Alex Nicholson	Decision (unanimous)	PFL 3 (2019)	6 June 2019	3	5:00	Uniondale, New York, United States	
Win	22–7–1 (1)	Mikhail Mokhnatkin	Decision (unanimous)	RCC 5	15 December 2018	3	5:00	Ekaterinburg, Russia	
Draw	21–7–1 (1)	Josh Copeland	Draw (unanimous)	PFL 8 (2018)	5 October 2018	2	5:00	New Orleans, Louisiana, United States	2018 PFL Heavyweight Tournament Quarterfinal. Eliminated via first round tiebreaker.
Win	21–7 (1)	Jack May	Submission (arm-triangle choke)	PFL 4 (2018)	19 July 2018	1	1:36	Uniondale, New York, United States	
Win	20–7 (1)	Daniel Gallemore	TKO (doctor stoppage)	PFL 1 (2018)	7 June 2018	1	3:57	New York City, New York, United States	Return to Heavyweight.
Loss	19–7 (1)	Gian Villante	Decision (split)	UFC 220	20 January 2018	3	5:00	Boston, Massachusetts, United States	
Loss	19–6 (1)	Aleksandar Rakić	Decision (unanimous)	UFC Fight Night: Volkov vs. Struve	2 September 2017	3	5:00	Rotterdam, Netherlands	
Win	19–5 (1)	Darren Stewart	Decision (unanimous)	UFC Fight Night: Manuwa vs. Anderson	18 March 2017	3	5:00	London, England	
NC	18–5 (1)	Darren Stewart	NC (inadvertent headbutt)	UFC Fight Night: Bader vs. Nogueira 2	19 November 2016	1	1:34	São Paulo, Brazil	Originally a TKO (punches) win for Stewart; overturned due to an inadvertent headbutt.
Loss	18–5	Nikita Krylov	Submission (rear-naked choke)	UFC Fight Night: Overeem vs. Arlovski	8 May 2016	2	3:11	Rotterdam, Netherlands	
Win	18–4	Elvis Mutapčić	Decision (unanimous)	UFC Fight Night: Dillashaw vs. Cruz	17 January 2016	3	5:00	Boston, Massachusetts, United States	
Win	17–4	Ryan Jimmo	Decision (unanimous)	UFC Fight Night: Condit vs. Alves	30 May 2015	3	5:00	Goiânia, Brazil	
Loss	16–4	Hans Stringer	Decision (split)	UFC Fight Night: Shogun vs. Henderson 2	23 March 2014	3	5:00	Natal, Brazil	
Win	16–3	Ednaldo Oliveira	Decision (unanimous)	UFC 163	3 August 2013	3	5:00	Rio de Janeiro, Brazil	
Win	15–3	Simao Melo	Submission (rear-naked choke)	WOCS: Watch Out Combat Show 25	12 April 2013	2	4:56	Rio de Janeiro, Brazil	Won the WOCS Light Heavyweight Championship.
Win	14–3	Cristiano Souza	TKO (doctor stoppage)	Shooto: Brazil 36	23 November 2012	1	N/A	Brasília, Brazil	Won the vacant Shooto Brazil Light Heavyweight Championship.
Win	13–3	Falco Lopes	Submission (guillotine choke)	Shooto: Brazil 28	10 March 2012	1	3:15	Rio de Janeiro, Brazil	
Loss	12–3	Baga Agaev	KO (punch and knees)	DFC: Desert Force 2	19 May 2011	1	1:13	Amman, Jordan	
Win	12–2	Abhijeet Petkar	KO (head kick)	DFC: Desert Force 1	8 December 2010	1	0:05	Amman, Jordan	
Win	11–2	Kleber Raimundo	Decision (unanimous)	CF: Capital Fight 3	5 November 2010	3	5:00	Brasília, Brazil	
Win	10–2	Jacob Quintana	TKO (submission to punches)	MK: Mega Kombat	24 July 2010	3	N/A	Minas Gerais, Brazil	
Win	9–2	Alessandro Stefano	TKO (punches)	BC: Bitetti Combat 5	12 December 2009	1	1:50	São Paulo, Brazil	
Win	8–2	Paulo Henrique Garcia	TKO (punches)	IMC: Iron Man Championship 3	10 September 2009	1	N/A	Belém, Brazil	
Win	7–2	Levi da Costa	TKO (corner stoppage)	Shooto: Brazil 12	30 May 2009	1	5:00	Rio de Janeiro, Brazil	
Win	6–2	Roque Oliver	Submission (rear-naked choke)	Shooto: Brazil 11	28 March 2009	1	4:48	Rio de Janeiro, Brazil	
Win	5–2	Joao Paulo de Souza	TKO (punches)	CC: Coari Combat 3	15 February 2009	1	N/A	Amazonas, Brazil	
Win	4–2	Adriano Balby	Submission (rear-naked choke)	MFC: Manaus Fight Championship	14 June 2008	1	0:52	Manaus, Brazil	
Loss	3–2	Geronimo dos Santos	TKO (punches)	AC: Amazon Challenge 2	1 March 2008	1	4:00	Manaus, Brazil	
Win	3–1	Sandro Pitbull	TKO (finger injury)	HTJ: Hero's the Jungle	13 October 2007	2	N/A	Manaus, Brazil	
Loss	2–1	Josue Makowiecky	KO (knee)	FF: Floripa Fight 1	26 November 2005	1	2:27	Florianópolis, Brazil	
Win	2–0	Rogerio Farias	TKO (submission to punches)	FCC: Fight Center Cup 4	21 October 2005	1	N/A	Rio Grande do Sul, Brazil	
Win	1–0	Junior Tigre	KO (head kick)	SFC: Slap Fight Combat	16 May 2005	1	4:27	Fortaleza, Brazil	

== See also ==
- List of male mixed martial artists
