= PFL 7 (2018) =

Professional Fighters League MMA event in 2018

- Promotion: Professional Fighters League
- Date: August 30, 2018
- Venue: Ocean Resort Casino
- City: Atlantic City, New Jersey

Event chronology
PFL 6	PFL 7	PFL 8

The PFL 7 mixed martial arts event for the 2018 season of the Professional Fighters League was held on August 30, 2018, at the Ocean Resort Casino in Atlantic City, New Jersey. It was the seventh and final regular season event of 2018 before the playoffs.

== Background ==
Lightweight's Brian Foster and Ramsey Nijem were expected to fight on this card, however both were ruled out of the tournament when Foster was unable to get licensed by the New Jersey athletic commission, and Nijem was unable to gain clearance from a medical suspension. As a result, Johnny Case vs. Jason High was made, with the winner determining the 155 divisions final playoff participant. On weigh in day however, the substitute fight had its own set back, as High missed the weight limit by 4.2 pounds, and the bout was scratched from the card all together. As a result, Case was awarded 3 points via walkover victory.

== Results ==
Main Card (NBCSN)
Weight class				Method	Round	Time	Notes
Light Heavyweight	Smealinho Rama	def.	Jamie Abdallah	TKO (doctor stoppage)	2	5:00
Light Heavyweight	Bazigit Atajev	def.	Sean O'Connell	TKO (spinning back kick and punches)	1	3:30
Featherweight	Alexandre Bezerra	def.	Magomed Idrisov	KO (flying knee)	1	3:24
Welterweight	Handesson Ferreira	def.	Paul Bradley	TKO (punches)	1	0:20
Heavyweight	Caio Alencar	def.	Mike Kyle	Decision (unanimous) (30-27, 30-27, 29-28)	3	5:00
Preliminary card (Facebook Watch)
Middleweight	Sadibou Sy	def.	Caio Magalhães	KO (head kick and punches)	1	2:06
Light Heavyweight	Emiliano Sordi	def.	Jason Butcher	KO (punch)	1	0:16
Bantamweight	Umar Nurmagomedov	def.	Saidyokub Kakharamonov	Decision (unanimous) (30-27, 30-27, 29-28)	3	5:00
Welterweight	Ramazan Kuramagomedov	def.	Robert Hale	Decision (unanimous) (30-27, 30-27, 30-27)	3	5:00
Heavyweight	Mo De'Reese	def.	Leroy Johnson	KO (knee)	1	2:25

== Standings after event ==
The point system consists of outcome based scoring and bonuses for an early win. Under the outcome based scoring system, the winner of a fight receives 3 points and the loser receives 0 points. If the fight ends in a draw, both fighters will receive 1 point. The bonus for winning a fight in the first, second, or third round is 3 points, 2 points, and 1 point respectively. For example, if a fighter wins a fight in the first round, then the fighter will receive 6 total points. If a fighter misses weight, then the fighter that missed weight will receive 0 points and his opponent will receive 3 points due to a walkover victory.

=== Featherweight ===
Fighter	Wins	Draws	Losses	1st	2nd	3rd	Total Points
♛ Steven Siler	2	0	0	2	0	0	12
♛ Lance Palmer	2	0	0	0	1	1	9
♛ Andre Harrison	2	0	0	0	0	0	6
🚫 Timur Valiev	2	0	0	0	0	0	6
♛ Alexandre Almeida	1	0	1	1	0	0	6
♛ Alexandre Bezerra	1	0	0	1	0	0	6
♛ Max Coga	1	0	1	0	0	1	4
♛ Nazareno Malegarie	1	0	1	0	0	0	3
E Magomed Idrisov	0	0	2	0	0	0	0
E Lee Coville	0	0	1	0	0	0	0
♛ Jumabieke Tuerxun	0	0	2	0	0	0	0
E Marcos Galvão	0	0	2	0	0	0	0
E Bekbulat Magomedov	0	0	2	0	0	0	0

=== Lightweight ===
Fighter	Wins	Draws	Losses	1st	2nd	3rd	Total Points
♛ Natan Schulte	2	0	0	1	0	0	9
♛ Will Brooks	2	0	0	0	0	0	6
♛ Islam Mamedov	2	0	0	0	0	0	6
♛ Chris Wade	1	0	1	0	0	0	6
♛ Robert Watley	1	0	1	0	1	0	5
♛ Thiago Tavares	1	0	1	0	0	0	3
♛ Rashid Magomedov	1	0	0	0	0	0	3
♛ Johnny Case	1	0	0	0	0	0	3
E Efrain Escudero	1*	0	1	0	0	1	0
E Arthur Estrázulas	0	0	1	0	0	0	0
E Luiz Firmino	0	0	2	0	0	0	0
E Jason High	0	0	3*	0	0	0	3
E Yuki Kawana	0	0	2	0	0	0	0
🚫	0	0	0	0	1	4	
🚫 Ramsey Nijem	0	0	1	0	0	0	0

- Although Efrain Escudero won his fight against Jason High, PFL MMA rules state a fighter who misses the weight limit forfeits all points from the match, and the opponent earns a walkover win.

=== Welterweight ===
Fighter	Wins	Draws	Losses	1st	2nd	3rd	Total Points
♛ Ray Cooper III	2	0	0	1	1	0	11
♛ João Zeferino	2	0	0	1	0	1	10
♛ Magomed Magomedkerimov	2	0	0	1	0	0	9
♛ Rick Story	2	0	0	0	1	0	8
♛ Handesson Ferreira	1	0	0	1	0	0	6
♛ Pavlo Kusch	1	0	1	0	1	0	5
♛ Bojan Veličković	1	0	1	0	1	0	5
♛ Jake Shields	1	0	1	0	0	0	3
E Abubakar Nurmagomedov	1	0	1	0	0	0	3
E Paul Bradley	0	0	1	0	0	0	0
E Yuri Villefort	0	0	2	0	0	0	0
E Jonatan Westin	0	0	2	0	0	0	0
E Herman Terrado	0	0	2	0	0	0	0
E Carlton Minus	0	0	1	0	0	0	0

=== Middleweight ===
Fighter	Wins	Draws	Losses	1st	2nd	3rd	Total Points
♛ Abuspiyan Magomedov	2	0	0	2	0	0	12
♛ Louis Taylor	2	0	0	0	0	1	7
♛ Shamil Gamzatov	2	0	0	0	0	0	6
♛ Bruno Santos	2	0	0	0	0	0	6
♛ Sadibou Sy	1	0	1	1	0	0	6
♛ John Howard	1	0	1	0	1	0	5
♛ Rex Harris	1	0	1	0	0	0	3
♛ Gasan Umalatov	1	0	1	0	0	0	3
E Caio Magalhães	0	0	1	0	0	0	0
E Anderson Gonçalves	0	0	2	0	0	0	0
E Eddie Gordon	0	0	2	0	0	0	0
E Andre Lobato	0	0	2	0	0	0	0

=== Light Heavyweight ===
Fighter	Wins	Draws	Losses	1st	2nd	3rd	Total Points
♛ Vinny Magalhães	2	0	0	2	0	0	12
♛ Maxim Grishin	2	0	0	1	1	0	11
♛ Dan Spohn	2	0	0	0	0	1	7
♛ Emiliano Sordi	1	0	0	1	0	0	6
♛ Bazigit Atajev	1	0	1	1	0	0	6
♛ Sean O'Connell	1	0	0	0	1	0	5
♛ Smealinho Rama	1	0	1	0	1	0	4
♛ Rakim Cleveland	1	0	1	0	0	1	4
E Brandon Halsey	1	0	1	0	0	1	4
🚫 Rashid Yusupov	0	0	1	0	0	0	0
🚫 Ronny Markes	0	0	1	0	0	0	0
E Jamie Abdallah	0	0	1	0	0	0	0
E Jason Butcher	0	0	2	0	0	0	0
E Artur Alibulatov	0	0	1	0	0	0	0

=== Heavyweight ===
Fighter	Wins	Draws	Losses	1st	2nd	3rd	Total Points
♛ (Brazil) Francimar Barroso	2	0	0	2	0	0	12
♛ (United States) Kelvin Tiller	2	0	0	1	1	0	11
♛ (Brazil) Philipe Lins	2	0	0	0	1	0	8
♛ (United States) Jack May	1	0	1	1	0	0	6
♛ (United States) Alex Nicholson	1	0	1	0	1	0	5
🚫 (Switzerland) Valdrin Istrefi	1	0	1	0	1	0	5
♛ (United States) Jared Rosholt	1	0	1	0	0	0	3
♛ (United States) Josh Copeland	1	0	1	0	0	0	3
♛ (Brazil) Caio Alencar	1	0	1	0	0	0	3
E (United States) Mike Kyle	0	0	0	0	0	0	0
E (United States) Daniel Gallemore	0	0	2	0	0	0	0
E (United States) Jake Heun	0	0	1	0	0	0	0
E (United States) Shawn Jordan	0	0	2	0	0	0	0

♛ = Clinched playoff spot --- 🚫 = Ruled out --- E = Eliminated

NOTE: Prior to PFL 8, which started the PFL playoff, Valdrin Istrefi was ruled out because of an injury. Caio Alencar was declared the first alternate and participated in the playoff.

== See also ==
- List of PFL events
- List of current PFL fighters
