= PFL 5 (2018) =

Professional Fighters League MMA event in 2018

- Promotion: Professional Fighters League
- Date: August 2, 2018
- Venue: Nassau Coliseum
- City: Uniondale, New York
- Estimated viewers: 112,000

Event chronology
PFL 4	PFL 5	PFL 6

The PFL 5 mixed martial arts event for the 2018 season of the Professional Fighters League was held on August 2, 2018, at the Nassau Coliseum in Uniondale, New York. This is the fifth regular season event of 2018 and included only fights in the lightweight and light heavyweight divisions.

== Background ==
Brian Foster was expected to face Natan Schulte at this event. However, Foster was removed due to an unspecified illness and replaced by Jason High.

Originally a fight was set between Islam Mamedov and Efraín Escudero. However, Escudero missed the 156-pound weight limit by over seven pounds, and the bout was scratched from the card all together. As a result, Mamedov was awarded 3 points via walkover victory.

== Results ==
Main Card (NBCSN)
Weight class				Method	Round	Time	Notes
Lightweight	Natan Schulte	def.	Jason High	Technical Submission (rear-naked choke)	1	4:18
Light Heavyweight	Vinny Magalhaes	def.	Brandon Halsey	TKO (punches)	1	1:34
Lightweight	Will Brooks	def.	Robert Watley	Decision (unanimous) (30-27, 30-27, 30-27)	3	5:00
Light Heavyweight	Maxim Grishin	def.	Rakim Cleveland	Submission (rear-naked choke)	2	4:03
Lightweight	Rashid Magomedov	def.	Luiz Firmino	Decision (unanimous) (30-27, 30-27, 29-28)	3	5:00
Preliminary card (Facebook Watch)
Lightweight	Chris Wade	def.	Yuki Kawana	Submission (guillotine choke)	1	4:24
Light Heavyweight	Dan Spohn	def.	Artur Alibulatov	Decision (unanimous) (30-26, 29-27, 29-27)	3	5:00
Lightweight	Thiago Tavares	def.	Arthur Estrázulas	Decision (split) (29-28, 28-29, 29-28)	3	5:00

== Standings after event ==
The point system consists of outcome based scoring and bonuses for an early win. Under the outcome based scoring system, the winner of a fight receives 3 points and the loser receives 0 points. If the fight ends in a draw, both fighters will receive 1 point. The bonus for winning a fight in the first, second, or third round is 3 points, 2 points, and 1 point respectively. For example, if a fighter wins a fight in the first round, then the fighter will receive 6 total points. If a fighter misses weight, then the fighter that missed weight will receive 0 points and his opponent will receive 3 points due to a walkover victory.

=== Lightweight ===
Fighter	Wins	Draws	Losses	1st	2nd	3rd	Total Points (Note: The eight fighters with most points (green background) advance to the playoffs)
♛ Natan Schulte	2	0	0	1	0	0	9
♛ Will Brooks	2	0	0	0	0	0	6
♛ Islam Mamedov	2	0	0	0	0	0	6
♛ Chris Wade	1	0	1	0	0	0	6
♛ Robert Watley	1	0	1	0	1	0	5
♛ Brian Foster	1	0	0	0	0	1	4
♛ Rashid Magomedov	1	0	0	0	0	0	3
Thiago Tavares	1	0	1	0	0	0	3
Ramsey Nijem	0	0	1	0	0	0	0
E Luiz Firmino	0	0	2	0	0	0	0
E Arthur Estrázulas	0	0	1	0	0	0	0
E Yuki Kawana	0	0	2	0	0	0	0
E Jason High	0	0	2*	0	0	0	3
E Efrain Escudero	1*	0	1	0	0	1	0
Sources:

- Although Efrain Escudero won his fight, he was ineligible to earn point due to missing the weight limit.

=== Light Heavyweight ===
Fighter	Wins	Draws	Losses	1st	2nd	3rd	Total Points (Note: The eight fighters with most points (green background) advance to the playoffs)
♛ Vinny Magalhães	2	0	0	2	0	0	12
♛ Maxim Grishin	2	0	0	1	1	0	11
♛ Dan Spohn	2	0	0	0	0	1	7
♛ Sean O'Connell	1	0	0	0	1	0	5
Rakim Cleveland	1	0	1	0	0	1	4
Brandon Halsey	1	0	1	0	0	1	4
Bazigit Atajev	0	0	1	0	0	0	0
Rashid Yusupov	0	0	1	0	0	0	0
Smealinho Rama	0	0	1	0	0	0	0
Ronny Markes	0	0	1	0	0	0	0
Jason Butcher	0	0	1	0	0	0	0
Jamie Abdallah	0	0	1	0	0	0	0
E Artur Alibulatov	0	0	1	0	0	0	0

♛ = Clinched playoff spot --- E = Eliminated

== See also ==
- List of PFL events
- List of current PFL fighters
