= PFL 2 (2018) =

Professional Fighters League MMA event in 2018

- Promotion: Professional Fighters League
- Date: June 21, 2018
- Venue: Chicago Theatre
- City: Chicago, Illinois
- Estimated viewers: 150,000

Event chronology
| PFL 1 | PFL 2 | PFL 3 |

The PFL 2 mixed martial arts event for the 2018 season of the Professional Fighters League was held on June 21, 2018, at the Chicago Theatre in Chicago, Illinois. It was the second regular season event of 2018 and included only fights in the lightweight and light heavyweight divisions.

== Background ==
Rashid Magomedov was expected to face Jason High at this event, however Magomedev was removed from the bout due to injury and replaced by Efraín Escudero. On weigh in day, the fight suffered another set back as Escudero missed the 156-pound weight limit by six pounds. As a result, Escudero became ineligible to earn points regardless of the outcome.

== Results ==
Main Card (NBCSN)
| Weight class | | | | Method | Round | Time | Notes |
|---|---|---|---|---|---|---|---|
| Lightweight | Will Brooks | def. | Luiz Firmino | Decision (unanimous) (30-27, 30-37, 30-27) | 3 | 5:00 |
| Lightweight | Brian Foster | def. | Ramsey Nijem | TKO (flying knee and punches) | 3 | 0:23 |
| Women's Lightweight | Kayla Harrison | def. | Brittney Elkin | Submission (armbar) | 1 | 3:18 |
| Lightweight | Efraín Escudero | def. | Jason High | Technical Submission (guillotine choke) | 3 | 0:35 |
| Light Heavyweight | Sean O'Connell | def. | Ronny Markes | TKO (punches) | 2 | 0:41 |
Preliminary card (Facebook Watch)
| Light Heavyweight | Brandon Halsey | def. | Smealinho Rama | TKO (doctor stoppage) | 3 | 0:01 |
| Lightweight | Islam Mamedov | def. | Yuki Kawana | Decision (unanimous) (30-27, 30-27, 29-28) | 3 | 5:00 |
| Light Heavyweight | Vinny Magalhaes | def. | Jamie Abdallah | Submission (rear-naked choke) | 1 | 1:37 |
| Light Heavyweight | Rakim Cleveland | def. | Rashid Yusupov | TKO (retirement) | 3 | 0:01 |
| Light Heavyweight | Maxim Grishin | def. | Jason Butcher | TKO (leg injury) | 1 | 1:41 |
| Lightweight | Robert Watley | def. | Thiago Tavares | TKO (groin kick) | 2 | 0:35 |
| Lightweight | Natan Schulte | def. | Chris Wade | Decision (unanimous) (30-26, 30-26, 29-28) | 3 | 5:00 |
| Light Heavyweight | Dan Spohn | def. | Bazigit Atajev | TKO (punches) | 3 | 4:31 |

== Standings after event ==
The point system consists of outcome based scoring and bonuses for an early win. Under the outcome based scoring system, the winner of a fight receives 3 points and the loser receives 0 points. If the fight ends in a draw, both fighters will receive 1 point. The bonus for winning a fight in the first, second, or third round is 3 points, 2 points, and 1 point respectively. For example, if a fighter wins a fight in the first round, then the fighter will receive 6 total points. If a fighter misses weight, then the fighter that missed weight will receive 0 points and his opponent will receive 3 points due to a walkover victory.

=== Lightweight ===
| Fighter | Wins | Draws | Losses | 1st | 2nd | 3rd | Total Points (Note: The eight fighters with most points (green background) advance to the playoffs) |
|---|---|---|---|---|---|---|---|
| Robert Watley | 1 | 0 | 0 | 0 | 1 | 0 | 5 |
| Brian Foster | 1 | 0 | 0 | 0 | 0 | 1 | 4 |
| Will Brooks | 1 | 0 | 0 | 0 | 0 | 0 | 3 |
| Natan Schulte | 1 | 0 | 0 | 0 | 0 | 0 | 3 |
| Islam Mamedov | 1 | 0 | 0 | 0 | 0 | 0 | 3 |
| Yuki Kawana | 0 | 0 | 1 | 0 | 0 | 0 | 0 |
| Luiz Firmino | 0 | 0 | 1 | 0 | 0 | 0 | 0 |
| Chris Wade | 0 | 0 | 1 | 0 | 0 | 0 | 0 |
| Jason High | 0 | 0 | 1* | 0 | 0 | 0 | 3 |
| Ramsey Nijem | 0 | 0 | 1 | 0 | 0 | 0 | 0 |
| Thiago Tavares | 0 | 0 | 1 | 0 | 0 | 0 | 0 |
| Efrain Escudero | 1* | 0 | 0 | 0 | 0 | 1 | 0 |
Sources:

- Although Efrain Escudero won his fight, he was ineligible to earn point due to missing the weight limit. By rule, the loser, Jason High, is credited with three points for walkover.

=== Light Heavyweight ===
| Fighter | Wins | Draws | Losses | 1st | 2nd | 3rd | Total Points (Note: The eight fighters with most points (green background) advance to the playoffs) |
|---|---|---|---|---|---|---|---|
| Vinny Magalhães | 1 | 0 | 0 | 1 | 0 | 0 | 6 |
| Maxim Grishin | 1 | 0 | 0 | 1 | 0 | 0 | 6 |
| Sean O'Connell | 1 | 0 | 0 | 0 | 1 | 0 | 5 |
| Rakim Cleveland | 1 | 0 | 0 | 0 | 0 | 1 | 4 |
| } Brandon Halsey | 1 | 0 | 0 | 0 | 0 | 1 | 4 |
| Dan Spohn | 1 | 0 | 0 | 0 | 0 | 1 | 4 |
| Bazigit Atajev | 0 | 0 | 1 | 0 | 0 | 0 | 0 |
| Smealinho Rama | 0 | 0 | 1 | 0 | 0 | 0 | 0 |
| Rashid Yusupov | 0 | 0 | 1 | 0 | 0 | 0 | 0 |
| Ronny Markes | 0 | 0 | 1 | 0 | 0 | 0 | 0 |
| Jason Butcher | 0 | 0 | 1 | 0 | 0 | 0 | 0 |
| Jamie Abdallah | 0 | 0 | 1 | 0 | 0 | 0 | 0 |

== See also ==
- List of PFL events
- List of current PFL fighters
