= PFL 9 (2018) =

Professional Fighters League MMA event in 2018

- Promotion: Professional Fighters League
- Date: October 13, 2018
- Venue: Long Beach Arena
- City: Long Beach, California

Event chronology
PFL 8	PFL 9	PFL 10

The PFL 9 mixed martial arts event for the 2018 season of the Professional Fighters League was held on October 13, 2018, at the Long Beach Arena in Long Beach, California.

== Background ==
The event was the ninth of the 2018 season and marked the start of the playoffs for the Light Heavyweight and Lightweight divisions.

== Results ==
Main Card (NBCSN)
Weight class				Method	Round	Time	Notes
Light Heavyweight	Vinny Magalhães	def.	Bazigit Atajev	Submission (kimura)	1	1:58	(Note: Semi-final round bout of the 2018 PFL Light Heavyweight playoffs.)
Lightweight	Natan Schulte	def.	Chris Wade	Decision (split) (28-29, 29-28, 29-28)	3	5:00	(Note: Semi-final round bout of the 2018 PFL Lightweight playoffs.)
Light Heavyweight	Sean O'Connell	def.	Smealinho Rama	KO (punches)	1	1:45	(Note: Semi-final round bout of the 2018 PFL Light Heavyweight playoffs.)
Lightweight	Rashid Magomedov	def.	Thiago Tavares	TKO (punches)	2	3:36	(Note: Semi-final round bout of the 2018 PFL Lightweight playoffs.)
Light Heavyweight	Vinny Magalhães	def.	Rakim Cleveland	Submission (kimura)	1	1:20	(Note: Quarter-final round bout of the 2018 PFL Light Heavyweight playoffs.)
Lightweight	Natan Schulte	def.	Johnny Case	Draw (majority) (19-18, 19-19, 19-19)	2	5:00	(Note: Quarter-final round bout of the 2018 PFL Lightweight playoffs.)
Light Heavyweight	Bazigit Atajev	def.	Emiliano Sordi	TKO (punches)	1	1:43	(Note: Quarter-final round bout of the 2018 PFL Light Heavyweight playoffs.)
Lightweight	Chris Wade	def.	Robert Watley	Decision (majority) (20-18, 20-18, 19-19)	2	5:00	(Note: Quarter-final round bout of the 2018 PFL Lightweight playoffs.)
Preliminary card (Facebook Watch)
Light Heavyweight	Sean O'Connell	def.	Dan Spohn	Decision (majority) (19-19, 19-18, 19-18)	2	5:00	(Note: Quarter-final round bout of the 2018 PFL Light Heavyweight playoffs.)
Lightweight	Islam Mamedov	def.	Thiago Tavares	Decision (unanimous) (20-18, 20-18, 20-18)	2	5:00	(Note: Quarter-final round bout of the 2018 PFL Lightweight playoffs.)
Light Heavyweight	Smealinho Rama	def.	Maxim Grishin	Draw (majority) (20-18, 19-19, 19-19)	2	5:00	(Note: Quarter-final round bout of the 2018 PFL Light Heavyweight playoffs.)
Lightweight	Rashid Magomedov	def.	Will Brooks	Draw (unanimous) (19-19, 19-19, 19-19)	2	5:00	(Note: Quarter-final round bout of the 2018 PFL Lightweight playoffs.)
Light Heavyweight	Brandon Halsey	def.	Ronny Markes	Decision (unanimous) (20-18, 20-18, 20-18)	2	5:00	(Note: 2018 PFL Light Heavyweight playoffs Alternate.)
Lightweight	Ramsey Nijem	def.	Yuki Kawana	Decision (unanimous) (19-18, 19-18, 19-18)	2	5:00	(Note: 2018 PFL Lightweight playoffs Alternate.)

== 2018 PFL Light Heavyweight playoffs ==
Quarter-finals
(Brazil) Vinny Magalhães (1)	SUB 1
(United States) Rakim Cleveland (8)	L
(Russia) Bazigit Atajev (4)	TKO 1
(Argentina) Emiliano Sordi (5)	L
(United States) Sean O'Connell (3)	MD 2
(United States) Dan Spohn (6)	L
(Russia) Maxim Grishin (2)	L
(Canada) Smealinho Rama (7)	Draw 2

Semi-finals
(Brazil) Vinny Magalhães (1)	SUB 1
(Russia) Bazigit Atajev (4)	L
(United States) Sean O'Connell (3)	KO 1
(Canada) Smealinho Rama (7)	L

Final
(Brazil) Vinny Magalhães (1)	L
(United States) Sean O'Connell (3)	TKO 3

Legend
(SD)	(Split Decision)
(UD)	(Unanimous Decision)
(MD)	(Majority Decision)
SUB	Submission
(T)KO	(Technical) Knock Out
L	Loss

== 2018 PFL Lightweight playoffs ==
Quarter-finals
(Brazil) Natan Schulte (1)	Draw 2
(United States) Johnny Case (8)	L
(United States) Chris Wade (4)	MD 2
(United States) Robert Watley (5)	L
(Russia) Islam Mamedov (3)	UD 2
(Brazil) Thiago Tavares (6)	L
(United States) Will Brooks (2)	L
(Russia) Rashid Magomedov (7)	Draw 2

Semi-finals
(Brazil) Natan Schulte (1)	SD 3
(United States) Chris Wade (4)	L
(Brazil) Thiago Tavares (6)	L
(Russia) Rashid Magomedov (7)	TKO 2

Final
(Brazil) Natan Schulte (1)	UD 5
(Russia) Rashid Magomedov (7)	L

* Islam Mamedov was originally scheduled to face Rashid Magomedov but was unable to continue in the tournament. He was replaced by his quarterfinal opponent, Thiago Tavares.

Legend
(SD)	(Split Decision)
(UD)	(Unanimous Decision)
(MD)	(Majority Decision)
SUB	Submission
(T)KO	(Technical) Knock Out
L	Loss

== See also ==
- List of PFL events
- List of current PFL fighters
