= Steve Bossé =

Canadian mixed martial artist

- Born: July 29, 1981 (age 45); Saint-Jean-sur-Richelieu, Quebec, Canada
- Other names: The Boss
- Height: 5 ft 11 in (1.80 m)
- Weight: 202 lb (92 kg; 14 st 6 lb)
- Division: Middleweight; Light Heavyweight; Heavyweight
- Reach: 74 in (188 cm)
- Fighting out of: Saint-Jean-sur-Richelieu, Quebec, Canada
- Team: Tristar Gym
- Years active: 2007–2016 (MMA); 2018 (Boxing)

Professional boxing record
- Total: 2
- Wins: 1
- By knockout: 1
- Losses: 1
- By knockout: 1

Mixed martial arts record
- Total: 15
- Wins: 12
- By knockout: 9
- By submission: 1
- By decision: 2
- Losses: 2
- By knockout: 2
- No contests: 1

Other information
- Mixed martial arts record from Sherdog

Steve Bossé (born July 29, 1981) is a Canadian retired mixed martial artist and professional boxer who competed in the heavyweight division. Bossé competed in the Light Heavyweight division of the UFC and was also known as an infamous hockey enforcer "The Boss" in the Quebec semi-professional league Ligue Nord-Américaine de Hockey Bossé was one of the most popular players amongst the Quebec fans.

== Early life ==
Bossé played hockey as a child and his goal was to become a professional in that sport. Always a tough player, he would train in boxing in order to improve his effectiveness on the ice. Bossé was a successful hockey enforcer in the Quebec semi-professional league of Ligue Nord-Américaine de Hockey (North American Hockey League) (LNAH).

== Mixed martial arts career ==
Bossé began his training in mixed martial arts with Mark Colangelo, a purple belt in Brazilian jiu-jitsu under Renzo Gracie, and with Stephane Dube, a popular martial artist in Quebec. Bossé became interested in MMA in 2006 after he met his agent Stephane Patry, who gave him his first opportunity to fight. Bossé made his professional debut in the organization TKO June 1, 2007 at the Montreal Bell Centre against David Fraser.

=== Strike Box/Titans Fighting incident ===
On February 6, 2009, Bossé fought James Thompson at Strike Box/Titans Fighting's inaugural event in Quebec, Canada. The event was originally scheduled to be conducted under Strike Box's own rules where only boxing, takedowns and standing submissions were allowed, but the rules were not accepted by the province's athletic commission in time for the event. It was therefore instead conducted under MMA rules. Before the event some fighters agreed to fight under Strike Box's proposed rules as a gentleman's agreement, though the referee in charge would not have any choice but to allow ground fighting were it to happen. Thompson, who later claimed to be unaware of the agreement, proceed to take down, mount and ground and pound Bossé - as allowed under MMA rules - after Bossé went for a standing guillotine choke at the start of the fight. This caused the attending audience to boo Thompson and the referee, unaware of that the fight was technically conducted under MMA rules. Beer cans and eventually chairs were then thrown into the ring, prompting referee Yves Lavigne to stop the match declaring it a no contest.

=== Ultimate Fighting Championship ===
Bossé was expected to make his promotional debut against Ryan Jimmo on April 16, 2014, at The Ultimate Fighter Nations Finale. However, Bossé was forced to pull out of the bout citing an injury. He was replaced by Sean O'Connell.

Bossé faced Thiago Santos on June 27, 2015, at UFC Fight Night 70. He lost the fight by knockout in the first round.

Bossé faced James Te Huna on March 20, 2016, at UFC Fight Night 85. He won the fight via KO in the first round.

Bossé next faced Sean O'Connell on June 18, 2016, at UFC Fight Night 89. Bossé was awarded a unanimous decision victory. The back and forth action earned both participants Fight of the Night honors.

Bossé was expected to face Jared Cannonier on July 7, 2017, at The Ultimate Fighter 25 Finale. However, Bossé was removed from the fight just days before the event and was replaced by promotional newcomer Nick Roehrick.

Bossé later announced that he would pursue a boxing career, and has not fought in mixed martial arts since.

== Professional boxing career ==
=== Bossé vs. Cuellar Cabrera ===
Steve “The Boss” Bossé made his professional boxing debut as part of the third installment of the 2017-2018 “CHRONO AVIATION Boxing Series 2017-2018”, February 15 at the Cabaret du Casino de Montréal. Bossé faced the Bolivian heavyweight Julio “Conceali” Cuellar Cabrera (12-6-0, 11 KOs), in a six-round bout. Bossé won via second-round KO.

=== Pascal vs. Bossé ===
On 9 May, it was announced that Bossé would fight Jean Pascal on 29 June 2018. The fight was postponed to take place on 20 July. Bossé tried to apply pressure on Pascal but was dropped once in round 3. Pascal continued to land heavy shots eventually dropping and stopping Bossé in eight round. It was reported that Bossé had suffered an injury during training on his right bicep and also suffered a broken jaw during the fight.

== Hockey record ==
GP = Games played; G = Goals; A = Assists; Pts = Points; PIM = Penalty minutes;

			Regular season					Playoffs
Season	Team	League	GP	G	A	Pts	PIM	GP	G	A	Pts	PIM
2003-04	Dragons de Verdun	LHSMQ	42	2	1	3	281	5	0	0	0	6
2004-05	Dragons de Verdun	LNAH	38	0	1	1	222	5	0	0	0	27
2005-06	Dragons de Verdun	LNAH	22	0	2	2	171	3	0	0	0	5
2005-06	Aigles de Saint-Jean	LHSPAA	19	1	2	3	169	-	-	-	-	-
2006-07	Summum-Chiefs de Saint-Jean-sur-Richelieu	LNAH	27	0	0	0	253	13	1	0	1	94
2007-08	Summum-Chiefs de Saint-Jean-sur-Richelieu	LNAH	13	0	0	0	71	4	0	0	0	20
2008-09	98.3 FM de Saguenay	LNAH	8	0	0	0	44	-	-	-	-	-

=== Hockey awards ===
Ligue Nord-Américaine de Hockey

- 2003-2004: Championship with the Dragons de Verdun
- 2006-2007: Championship with the Summum-Chiefs de Saint-Jean-sur-Richelieu

== Championships and accomplishments ==
=== Mixed martial arts ===
- Ultimate Fighting Championship
  - Fight of the Night (One time) vs. Sean O'Connell
  - UFC.com Awards
    - 2016: Ranked #4 Fight of the Year vs. Sean O'Connell

== Mixed martial arts record ==
Professional record breakdown
15 matches	12 wins	2 losses
By knockout	9	2
By submission	1	0
By decision	2	0
No contests	1	

Res.	Record	Opponent	Method	Event	Date	Round	Time	Location	Notes
Win	12–2 (1)	Sean O'Connell	Decision (unanimous)	UFC Fight Night: MacDonald vs. Thompson	June 18, 2016	3	5:00	Ottawa, Ontario, Canada	Fight of the Night.
Win	11–2 (1)	James Te Huna	KO (punch)	UFC Fight Night: Hunt vs. Mir	March 20, 2016	1	0:52	Brisbane, Australia	Returned to Light Heavyweight.
Loss	10–2 (1)	Thiago Santos	KO (head kick)	UFC Fight Night: Machida vs. Romero	June 27, 2015	1	0:29	Hollywood, Florida, United States	Middleweight debut.
Win	10–1 (1)	Caleb Grummet	TKO (doctor stoppage)	Challenge MMA 1	May 11, 2013	1	5:00	Richelieu, Quebec, Canada	
Win	9–1 (1)	Houston Alexander	KO (elbow)	Instinct MMA 1	October 7, 2011	2	4:11	Boisbriand, Quebec, Canada	
Win	8–1 (1)	Mychal Clark	TKO (punches)	W-1 MMA 5: Judgment Day	June 19, 2010	1	4:29	Montreal, Quebec, Canada	
Win	7–1 (1)	Marvin Eastman	Decision (unanimous)	MFL 2: Battleground	February 27, 2010	3	5:00	Montreal, Quebec, Canada	
Win	6–1 (1)	Craig Brown	TKO (punches)	Ringside MMA 3: Battle for the Belt	September 19, 2009	1	2:45	Montreal, Quebec, Canada	Won the vacant Ringside MMA Light Heavyweight Championship.
Win	5–1 (1)	Yan Pellerin	TKO (punches)	Ringside MMA 1: The Comeback	May 30, 2009	1	0:45	Montreal, Quebec, Canada	Light Heavyweight debut.
NC	4–1 (1)	James Thompson	No Contest	Titans Fighting	February 6, 2009	N/A	N/A	Montreal, Quebec, Canada	Originally a special rules bout (StrikeBox), but was forced by commission to fight under MMA rules. The bout ended in a no contest when beer cans and chairs began to be thrown into the ring
Win	4–1	Sebastien Gauthier	TKO (punches)	TKO 35: Quenneville vs. Hioki	October 7, 2008	1	3:59	Montreal, Quebec, Canada	
Win	3–1	Wes Sims	Submission (toe hold)	TKO 34: Sims vs. Bossé	June 7, 2008	1	3:05	Montreal, Quebec, Canada	
Loss	2–1	Icho Larenas	TKO (punches)	TKO 31: Young Guns	December 14, 2007	3	3:31	Montreal, Quebec, Canada	
Win	2–0	Jody Burke	TKO (punches)	TKO 30: Apocalypse	September 28, 2007	1	1:20	Montreal, Quebec, Canada	
Win	1–0	David Fraser	TKO (punches)	TKO 29: Repercussion	June 1, 2007	1	2:02	Montreal, Quebec, Canada	

== Professional boxing record ==
2 fights	1 win	1 loss
By knockout	1	1

No.	Result	Record	Opponent	Type	Round, time	Date	Location	Notes
2	Loss	1–1	Jean Pascal	TKO	8 (10), 3:00	Jul 20, 2018	Place Bell, Laval, Quebec, Canada	
1	Win	1–0	Julio Cuellar Cabrera	KO	2 (6), 0:52	Feb 15, 2018	Montreal Casino, Montreal, Quebec, Canada	

== See also ==
- List of current UFC fighters
- List of Canadian UFC fighters
- List of male mixed martial artists
