= Vinny Magalhães =

Brazilian practitioner of Brazilian Jiu-Jitsu and mixed martial artist

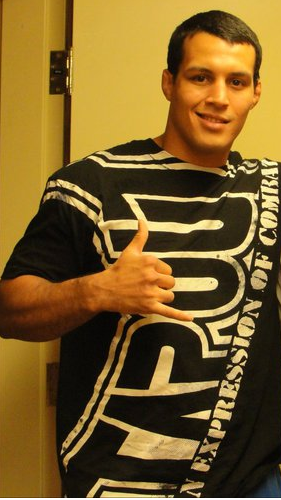
- Vinny Magalhaes (Yellow trunks) vs Jamie Abdallah (Black Trunks) battling in their PFL MMA Debut.
- Born: Vinicius de Magalhães; July 2, 1984 (age 42); Rio de Janeiro, Brazil
- Other names: Pezão
- Height: 6 ft 3 in (1.91 m)
- Weight: 205 lb (93 kg; 14 st 9 lb)
- Division: Light heavyweight
- Reach: 79 in (201 cm)
- Style: Brazilian jiu-jitsu, Submission wrestling
- Fighting out of: Las Vegas, Nevada, United States
- Team: Xtreme Couture; Vinny Magalhães BJJ
- Teachers: Royler Gracie, Vinicius Aieta, Eddie Bravo, Mark Beecher (Muay Thai)
- Rank: 4th Degree Black Belt in Brazilian Jiu-Jitsu; Black Belt in 10th Planet Jiu-Jitsu
- Years active: 2006-present

Mixed martial arts record
- Total: 33
- Wins: 19
- By knockout: 3
- By submission: 15
- By decision: 1
- Losses: 12
- By knockout: 5
- By submission: 1
- By decision: 6
- No contests: 2

Other information
- Mixed martial arts record from Sherdog

Vinicius "Vinny" de Magalhães (/ˌmɑːɡəˈljaɪnz/ MAH-ghə-LYEYENZ; Portuguese pronunciation: [maɡaˈʎɐ̃js]; born July 2, 1984) is a Brazilian mixed martial artist who competes in the Light heavyweight division. A professional competitor since 2006, he was a finalist in The Ultimate Fighter: Team Nogueira vs. Team Mir and has fought five times within two stints with the Ultimate Fighting Championship. He is the former Titan FC Light heavyweight Champion, M-1 Global Light heavyweight Champion and is also a former jiu-jitsu no-gi world champion and ADCC champion. Magalhães was inducted into the ADCC Hall of Fame in 2024.

== Background ==
Magalhães was born and raised in Rio de Janeiro, Brazil. He played football, and began training in Brazilian jiu-jitsu when he was 14 years old. His mentors are Royler Gracie & Vini Aieta

== Grappling career ==
Magalhães was promoted to black belt by his instructors Vinicius Aieta and Royler Gracie, on the podium after winning thirteen matches (ten by submissions), and taking home two gold medals in the 2005 World Jiu-Jitsu Championship as a brown belt. Magalhães has recently expressed that he's been training in different grappling styles such as sambo (primarily leg locks) and catch wrestling. He is also known, despite his background in Brazilian Jiu-Jitsu, as being one of the primary pioneers (along with Shinya Aoki and others) of 10th planet jiu-jitsu techniques in MMA.

In 2007, Magalhães would become the first Jiu-Jitsu No Gi world champion in the Super Heavyweight Division as a black belt.

In 2009, Magalhães had an impressive performance in the ADCC Submission Wrestling World Championship, winning 2 Bronze Medals (Under 99 kg Division and Absolute Division). On his way to win the bronze medal in his weight Division, Magalhães defeated BJJ World Champion Rodrigo Cavaca (1st Round, Inverted Heel Hook), the 2003 ADCC World Champion and 2x BJJ Absolute World Champion Marcio Cruz(Quarter-Finals, Flying Armbar), ADCC Brazil Trial Winner and Fellow MMA fighter Glover Teixeira (3rd Place Match, Armbar) and Losing a razor edge decision on points to the eventual Champion Xande Ribeiro (Semi-Final, Points). On his run for his second bronze medal, Magalhães beat the 2005 ADCC Absolute World Champion Dean Lister by judges' decision, moving on to the quarterfinals against the 2X NCAA Wrestler and MMA Prospect Chris Weidman, who he beat by Flying Armbar (His second in the Competition), which put him in the Semi-Final against Braulio Estima, who beat Magalhães by points, and became the eventual Absolute Champion. In the 3rd Place match, Magalhães used his experience against Gunnar Nelson to score a Takedown in the last few seconds of the over time to guarantee his second bronze medal in his first ADCC.

In 2011, Magalhães went up weight class in the ADCC Tournament, competing at the 99 kg and over division. He became the divisional winner, beating the reigning champion Fabrício Werdum by points in the final match.

On August 9, 2014, Magalhães fought Keenan Cornelius in a grappling match in Metamoris IV. The fight ended in a draw. On November 22, 2014, Magalhães again fought at Metamoris V against Matheus Diniz that also ended in a draw.

At the 2015 ADCC Tournament, Magalhães won the bronze medal in the 99 kg and over division. All his wins came by submission, including a twister against Rodrigo Artilheiro in the quarterfinals.

Magalhães was invited to compete in the over 99 kg division at the 2024 ADCC World Championship. He lost a decision to Damon Ramos in the opening round.

Vinny Magalhães
Medal record

Representing Brazil

Grappling

Abu Dhabi Combat Club
Bronze medal – third place	2015 São Paulo, (Brazil)	+99kg
Gold medal – first place	2011 Nottingham, (England)	+99kg
Bronze medal – third place	2009 Barcelona, (Spain)	Absolute
Bronze medal – third place	2009 Barcelona, (Spain)	-99kg

World Jiu-Jitsu Championship (No Gi)
Gold medal – first place	2007 Los Angeles, (United States)	-97.8kg

World Jiu-Jitsu Championship (Gi)
Bronze medal – third place	2007 Long Beach, (United States)	+100.5kg

== Mixed martial arts career ==
=== The Ultimate Fighter ===
Magalhães defeated Lance Evans, brother of Rashad Evans, when Evans quit after the first round due to a rib injury. Magalhães then defeated Jules Bruchez by armbar in the first round to move to the semifinals. Magalhães then fought Krzysztof Soszynski and defeated him by armbar in the first round, thus moving on to the finals to face Ryan Bader.

=== Ultimate Fighting Championship ===
Magalhães lost via first round TKO in his UFC debut in the finals of The Ultimate Fighter: Team Nogueira vs. Team Mir against former castmate Ryan Bader at The Ultimate Fighter 8 Finale.

Magalhães' next fight was at UFC 97, taking on former The Ultimate Fighter castmate Eliot Marshall. Magalhães lost a unanimous decision (30-27, 30–27, 29-28).

Magalhães was released from the UFC on April 29, 2009, due to his 0–2 record with the company.

=== M-1 Global ===
After being released from the UFC, Magalhães went 7–1, winning five fights by submission and two by knockout while dropping one by decision, improving his overall record to 9-5 (1).

Magalhães scored an mounted gogoplata submission victory over Viktor Nemkov to become the M-1 Global Light heavyweight Champion. He then went on to defend the light heavyweight championship with a third-round TKO victory over Mikhail Zayats.

After a contract dispute with M-1 Global, Magalhães placed his belt for sale on eBay.com with a bid of over US$90,000.

=== Return to UFC ===
On July 17, 2012, it was announced that Magalhães had re-signed with the UFC. He faced Igor Pokrajac on September 22, 2012, at UFC 152. and won via armbar at 1:14 of the 2nd round.

Magalhães faced Phil Davis on April 27, 2013, at UFC 159. losing in a unanimous decision.

Magalhães faced Anthony Perosh on August 3, 2013, at UFC 163. He lost by knockout in just fourteen seconds in round 1. After this loss, he was released from the UFC again.

=== Independent promotions ===
Magalhães denied any talks of retirement and was expected to fight Jeff Monson in a heavyweight bout on November 9, 2013, at Global Warrior Challenge 2: USA vs Brazil. However, Magalhães pulled out of the fight due to a prolonged back injury.

Magalhães defeated previously unbeaten Mexican fighter Jorge Gonzalez at Xtreme Kombat 24 via first round rear naked choke on July 19, 2014, in Naucalpan de Juárez, Mexico; After almost a full year absence from fighting.

=== Titan Fighting Championships ===
Magalhães was expected to take on Jason Brilz in the main event of Titan FC 28. However, he was forced out due to injury and replaced by Raphael Davis.

The championship fight with Brilz was re-booked and took place on September 26, 2014, at Titan FC 30 in Cedar Park, Texas, Magalhães defeated Brilz in the opening minute of the 4th round via guillotine choke after dropping Brilz with a headkick. Magalhães is now the TitanFC light heavyweight champion.

=== World Series of Fighting ===
Magalhães was scheduled to face UFC veteran Matt Hamill at WSOF 20 on April 10, 2015. However, he was pulled from the bout after a contract dispute with Titan Fighting Championships. He eventually faced Hamill at WSOF 24 held on October 17, 2015, and won via submission in the first round.

Magalhães fought for the WSOF light heavyweight championship at WSOF 33 on October 7, 2016, against champion David Branch. He lost via unanimous decision.

=== Absolute Championship Berkut ===
Magalhães faced Karol Celinski on July 1, 2017, at ACB 63. He lost the fight via unanimous decision.

=== Professional Fighters League ===
==== 2018 PFL season ====
In his PFL debut, Vinny faced Jamie Abdallah at PFL 2 on June 21, 2018. He won the bout via first round rear-naked choke.

In his sophomore performance, Vinny faced Brandon Halsey at PFL 5 on August 2, 2018. He won the bout after connecting with a head kick in the first round and finishing Halsey on the ground.

In the quarterfinals on October 13, 2018, at PFL 9, Vinny faced Rakim Cleveland, winning the bout via first round kimura.

In the semifinals on the same night at PFL 9, Vinny faced Bazigit Atajev, winning via first round kimura once again.

In the finals, Vinny faced Sean O'Connell at PFL 11 on December 31, 2018. He lost the back-and-forth fight via TKO between the third and fourth round after Vinny Magalhães stopped the bout.

==== 2019 PFL season ====
In the first fight of the season, Vinny faced eventual season winner Emiliano Sordi at PFL 3 on June 6, 2019. He lost the bout via TKO in the second round.

In a rematch of the previous season, he faced Rakim Cleveland at PFL 6 on August 8, 2019. He won the bout via first round armbar.

Making it to the quarterfinals, Vinny faced Rashid Yusupov at PFL 9 on October 31, 2019. He lost the bout in the first round via TKO .

==== 2021 PFL season ====
At the beginning of April, Vinny replaced Smealinho Rama for the whole 2021 season. He was scheduled to face Jordan Young at PFL 2 on April 29, 2021. At weigh-ins, Vinny missed weight and had to be taken to the hospital due to complications of his weight cut and was pulled from the bout.

Vinny faced Antônio Carlos Júnior at PFL 5 on June 17, 2021. Halfway through round one, Júnior hit Magalhães with an accidental knee to the groin, rendering him unable to continue. This led to the bout being declared a no contest.

== Championships and accomplishments ==
=== Grappling ===
- ADCC Submission Wrestling Championship
  - 2015 Bronze Medal in the 99+ Division
  - 2011 Gold Medal in the 99+ Division
  - 2009 Bronze Medal in the -99 kg Division
  - 2009 Bronze Medal in the Absolute Division
- World Jiu-Jitsu Championship (Mundials)
  - 2007 1st place in the "Super Heavyweight" division
  - 2007 3rd place in the "SuperSuper Heavyweight" division
  - 2005 1st place the Absolute division
  - 2005 1st place in the Super Heavyweight division
  - 2003 3rd place in the Absolute division
  - 2002 1st place the Heavyweight division
  - 2001 2nd place in the Absolute division
  - 2000 3rd place in the Middleweight division

=== Mixed martial arts ===
- M-1 Global
  - M-1 Global Light heavyweight Championship (One time)
  - One successful title defense
- Titan Fighting Championships
  - Titan FC Light heavyweight Championship (One time)

== Mixed martial arts record ==
Professional record breakdown
33 matches	19 wins	12 losses
By knockout	3	5
By submission	15	1
By decision	1	6
No contests	2	

Res.	Record	Opponent	Method	Event	Date	Round	Time	Location	Notes
NC	19–12 (2)	Antônio Carlos Júnior	NC (accidental knee to groin)	PFL 5 (2021)	June 17, 2021	1	2:45	Atlantic City, New Jersey, United States	Accidental knee to the groin rendered Magalhães unable to continue.
Loss	19–12 (1)	Rashid Yusupov	KO (punch)	PFL 9 (2019)	October 31, 2019	1	2:46	Las Vegas, Nevada, United States	2019 PFL Light Heavyweight Tournament Quarterfinal.
Win	19–11 (1)	Rakim Cleveland	Submission (armbar)	PFL 6 (2019)	August 8, 2019	1	1:56	Atlantic City, New Jersey, United States	
Loss	18–11 (1)	Emiliano Sordi	TKO (punches)	PFL 3 (2019)	June 6, 2019	2	2:45	Uniondale, New York, United States	
Loss	18–10 (1)	Sean O'Connell	TKO (corner stoppage)	PFL 11 (2018)	December 31, 2018	3	5:00	New York City, New York, United States	2018 PFL Light Heavyweight Tournament Final.
Win	18–9 (1)	Bozigit Ataev	Submission (kimura)	PFL 9 (2018)	October 13, 2018	1	1:58	Long Beach, California, United States	2018 PFL Light Heavyweight Tournament Semifinal.
Win	17–9 (1)	Rakim Cleveland	Submission (flying triangle kimura)	PFL 9 (2018)	October 13, 2018	1	1:20	Long Beach, California, United States	2018 PFL Light Heavyweight Tournament Quarterfinal.
Win	16–9 (1)	Brandon Halsey	TKO (punches)	PFL 5 (2018)	August 2, 2018	1	1:34	Uniondale, New York, United States	
Win	15–9 (1)	Jamie Abdallah	Submission (rear-naked choke)	PFL 2 (2018)	June 21, 2018	1	1:37	Chicago, Illinois, United States	
Loss	14–9 (1)	Karol Celinski	Decision (unanimous)	ACB 63	July 1, 2017	3	5:00	Gdańsk, Poland	
Loss	14–8 (1)	David Branch	Decision (unanimous)	WSOF 33	October 7, 2016	5	5:00	Kansas City, Missouri, United States	For the WSOF Light Heavyweight Championship.
Win	14–7 (1)	Jake Heun	Decision (unanimous)	WSOF 30	April 2, 2016	3	5:00	Las Vegas, Nevada, United States	
Win	13–7 (1)	Matt Hamill	Submission (kneebar)	WSOF 24	October 17, 2015	1	1:08	Mashantucket, Connecticut, United States	
Win	12–7 (1)	Jason Brilz	Submission (guillotine choke)	Titan FC 30	September 26, 2014	4	0:36	Cedar Park, Texas, United States	Won the inaugural Titan FC Light Heavyweight Championship.
Win	11–7 (1)	Jorge Gonzalez	Submission (rear-naked choke)	Xtreme Kombat 24	July 19, 2014	1	3:12	Naucalpan de Juárez, Mexico	
Loss	10–7 (1)	Anthony Perosh	KO (punches)	UFC 163	August 3, 2013	1	0:14	Rio de Janeiro, Brazil	
Loss	10–6 (1)	Phil Davis	Decision (unanimous)	UFC 159	April 27, 2013	3	5:00	Newark, New Jersey, United States	
Win	10–5 (1)	Igor Pokrajac	Submission (armbar)	UFC 152	September 22, 2012	2	1:14	Toronto, Ontario, Canada	
Win	9–5 (1)	Mikhail Zayats	TKO (head kick and punches)	M-1 Challenge 27	October 14, 2011	3	1:13	Phoenix, Arizona, United States	Defended the M-1 Global Light Heavyweight Championship.
Win	8–5 (1)	Viktor Nemkov	Submission (gogoplata neck crank)	M-1 Challenge 25	April 28, 2011	3	1:40	Saint Petersburg, Russia	Won the vacant M-1 Global Light Heavyweight Championship.
Win	7–5 (1)	Jake Doerr	TKO (punches)	M-1 Challenge 24	March 25, 2011	1	1:47	Norfolk, Virginia, United States	
Win	6–5 (1)	Robert Scott	Submission (armbar)	MMA Xplosion: International Team Challenge	January 29, 2011	2	3:51	Las Vegas, Nevada, United States	
Win	5–5 (1)	Alikhan Magomedov	Submission (triangle armbar)	M-1 Challenge 22	December 10, 2010	2	1:10	Moscow, Moscow Oblast, Russia	
Loss	4–5 (1)	Pedro Galiza	Decision (unanimous)	Shark Fights 9	March 20, 2010	3	5:00	Amarillo, Texas, United States	
Win	4–4 (1)	Mike Nickels	Submission (armbar)	Ring of Fire 36	December 4, 2009	1	1:19	Denver, Colorado, United States	
Win	3–4 (1)	Chris Davis	Submission (triangle choke)	Carolina Fight Promotions: The Carolina Crown 2	October 24, 2009	1	1:13	Raleigh, North Carolina, United States	
Loss	2–4 (1)	Eliot Marshall	Decision (unanimous)	UFC 97	April 18, 2009	3	5:00	Montreal, Quebec, Canada	
Loss	2–3 (1)	Ryan Bader	TKO (punches)	The Ultimate Fighter: Team Nogueira vs. Team Mir Finale	December 13, 2008	1	2:18	Las Vegas, Nevada, United States	The Ultimate Fighter 8 Light Heavyweight Tournament Final.
Loss	2–2 (1)	Raphael Davis	Submission (verbal)	Valor Fighting: Fight Night	March 7, 2008	2	3:03	Tustin, California, United States	
Win	2–1 (1)	Luis Ojeda	Submission (armbar)	MMA Xtreme 18	January 26, 2008	1	0:19	Tijuana, Mexico	
Win	1–1 (1)	Adolfo de la Torre	Submission (armbar)	MMA Xtreme 15	November 16, 2007	1	0:21	Mexico City, Mexico	
Loss	0–1 (1)	George Bush	Decision (unanimous)	Gracie FC: Evolution	May 19, 2007	3	5:00	Columbus, Ohio, United States	
NC	0–0 (1)	Chris Larkin	No Contest	Gracie Proving Ground 1	November 11, 2006	N/A	N/A	Columbus, Ohio, United States	Light Heavyweight debut. Fighters fell out of the cage.

Exhibition record breakdown		
3 matches	3 wins	0 losses
By knockout	1	0
By submission	2	0

Res.	Record	Opponent	Method	Event	Date	Round	Time	Location	Notes
Win	3–0	Krzysztof Soszynski	Submission (armbar)	The Ultimate Fighter: Team Nogueira vs. Team Mir	December 3, 2008 (airdate)	1	3:45	Las Vegas, Nevada, United States	TUF 8 Semifinal round
Win	2–0	Jules Bruchez	Submission (armbar)	The Ultimate Fighter: Team Nogueira vs. Team Mir	October 29, 2008 (airdate)	1	3:25	Las Vegas, Nevada, United States	TUF 8 Quarterfinal round
Win	1–0	Lance Evans	TKO (rib injury)	The Ultimate Fighter: Team Nogueira vs. Team Mir	September 17, 2008 (airdate)	1	0:34	Las Vegas, Nevada, United States	TUF 8 Elimination round

== See also ==
- List of current mixed martial arts champions
- List of male mixed martial artists
- List of Brazilian Jiu-Jitsu practitioners
