= Will Brooks =

American mixed martial artist (born 1986)

- Born: Willie Love Brooks; October 8, 1986 (age 40); Chicago, Illinois, United States
- Other names: Ill Will
- Height: 5 ft 11 in (180 cm)
- Weight: 155 lb (70 kg; 11 st 1 lb)
- Division: Lightweight
- Reach: 72 in (183 cm)
- Stance: Orthodox
- Fighting out of: Coconut Creek, Florida, United States
- Team: Midwest Training Center (2009–2013); American Top Team (2012–present)
- Years active: 2011–present

Mixed martial arts record
- Total: 32
- Wins: 26
- By knockout: 7
- By submission: 6
- By decision: 13
- Losses: 5
- By knockout: 2
- By submission: 3
- Draws: 1

Other information
- Mixed martial arts record from Sherdog

Willie Love Brooks (born October 8, 1986) is an American mixed martial artist who competes in the Lightweight division. A professional competitor since 2011, he is the former Bellator MMA Lightweight World Champion, and has also competed for DREAM, the Professional Fighters League and the UFC.

== Background ==
Brooks grew up in Chicago projects in a broken home with his parents struggling with their demons. After getting kicked out of several schools due to fighting, he took up wrestling at Warren Township High School, but his main focus was playing football. Excelling in football during high school, he ended up going to college to play at Harper College, where he was an All-American in his first year. However, he let go of his dreams of playing in the NFL after sustaining a knee injury, which led to partying, substance abuse and eventually drug dealing. During his time in Harper, he met an old friend from high school in Nick Redding, who ended up changing the course of his life to MMA.

== Mixed martial arts career ==
=== Early career ===
Brooks made his professional MMA debut in January 2011. He competed exclusively in his native Illinois and quickly amassed an undefeated record of 7-0 in the first two years of his career.

=== DREAM ===
In late 2012, Brooks received the biggest opportunity of his career as he was invited to Japan by the DREAM organization. He faced experienced veteran Satoru Kitaoka at Dream 18 on December 31, 2012. Despite being a heavy underdog, Brooks dominated the fight and won via TKO in the second round.

=== Bellator MMA ===
Following his impressive international debut, Brooks was quickly signed by Bellator Fighting Championships in January 2013.

==== Bellator Season 8 Lightweight Tournament ====
For his debut, Brooks was entered into the Bellator Lightweight Tournament. He faced Ricardo Tirloni in the opening round at Bellator 87 and won the fight via unanimous decision.

He faced Saad Awad in the semi-finals at Bellator 91 on February 28, 2013, and lost via KO in the first round.

Following the first loss of his career, Brooks rebounded with a win over Cris Leyva at Bellator 97 on July 31, 2013.

==== Bellator Season 9 Lightweight Tournament ====
In the fall of 2013, Brooks entered into the Bellator Season 9 Lightweight tournament. He faced veteran John Alessio in the Quarterfinals on September 27, 2013, at Bellator 101. He won the fight in dominant fashion via unanimous decision.

Brooks had a rematch with Saad Awad in the semifinal round at Bellator 105 on October 25, 2013, and dominated the fight for all three rounds, winning a unanimous decision victory.

Brooks faced Alexander Sarnavskiy in the finals at Bellator 109 on November 22, 2013. He won the fight via dominant unanimous decision to earn a future title shot at the Lightweight title.

==== Title shot and championship reign ====
On May 17, 2014, Brooks faced Michael Chandler filling in for the injured champ Eddie Alvarez at Bellator 120 for the Interim Bellator Lightweight Championship. He won via split decision to become the Interim Bellator Lightweight Champion.

With Bellator Lightweight Champion Eddie Alvarez leaving the promotion, Brooks faced Michael Chandler in a rematch at Bellator 131 on November 15, 2014, for the vacant Bellator Lightweight Championship. He won the fight via TKO in the fourth round to become the undisputed Bellator Lightweight Champion.

Brooks made his first title defense against long-awaited challenger Dave Jansen at Bellator 136 on April 10, 2015. He won the fight by unanimous decision.

Brooks made his second defense against Marcin Held on November 6, 2015, at Bellator 145. Despite Held popping Brooks' knee in the opening round, Brooks continued on and won the fight via unanimous decision to retain the Bellator Lightweight Championship.

On May 14, 2016, Brooks was released from Bellator MMA as the promotion decided not to renew his contract.

=== Ultimate Fighting Championship ===
On June 15, 2016, it was announced that Brooks had signed a six-fight deal with the UFC. He made his promotional debut against Ross Pearson on July 8, 2016, at The Ultimate Fighter 23 Finale. Brooks won the fight by unanimous decision.

Brooks next faced Alex Oliveira on October 1, 2016, at UFC Fight Night 96. The bout took place at a catchweight of 161.5 lbs, as Oliveira missed weight. Brooks lost the fight via KO in the third round.

Brooks faced Charles Oliveira on April 8, 2017, at UFC 210. He lost the fight by rear-naked choke submission in the first round.

Brooks was scheduled to face Nik Lentz on October 7, 2017, at UFC 216. However the pairing was scrapped during the weigh-ins for the event, as Lentz was stricken with "medical issues" and deemed unfit to compete. The pairing with Lentz was rescheduled and eventually took take place on November 19, 2017 at UFC Fight Night 121. Brooks lost the fight via submission in the second round.

On February 14, 2018, Brooks announced via social media that he had been officially released from the UFC after a 4 fight stint.

=== Professional Fighters League ===
Following his departure from the UFC, Brooks announced he had signed a deal with the Professional Fighters League and he would be entering the promotion's one million dollar tournament.

==== PFL season 2018 ====
In his debut, Brooks faced Luiz Firmino at PFL 2 on June 21, 2018. He won the fight by unanimous decision.

In his second fight in the Lightweight tournament, Brooks faced Robert Watley on August 2, 2018, at PFL 5. He won the fight by unanimous decision and advanced to the playoffs.

In the quarterfinal bout Brooks faced Rashid Magomedov at PFL 9 on October 13, 2018. The bout ended in a unanimous draw, but Brooks was eliminated from the tournament via first-round tiebreaker.

In the end of January 2019, Brooks announced in social media that he became a free agent after the inaugural season of PFL.

=== Post-PFL career ===
Brooks was expected to face Abel Trujillo at Battlefield FC 2 on July 27, 2019, but Trujillo was withdrawn from the bout and was replaced by Brooks' teammate Gleison Tibau. He lost the fight via first-round submission, tho the stoppage was controversial as the ref mistakenly thought Brooks was unconscious.

On March 30, 2020, news surfaced that Brooks had signed a contract with ARES FC.

Brooks faced Steven Siler on July 30, 2021 at XMMA 2. He won the bout via unanimous decision.

Brooks faced Jose Filho at Art of Scrap 3 on October 30, 2021. He won the bout via rear-naked choke submission in the third round.

Brooks faced Rafael Bastos on April 15, 2022 at Art of Scrap 4. He won the fight via TKO due to injury after Bastos broke his leg early in the first round.

Brooks faced Luis Peña at XMMA 5 on July 23, 2022. He won the bout via split decision.

Brooks faced Jhonasky Sojo at Titan FC 81 on April 14, 2023. He won the bout via rear-naked choke in the third round.

Brooks faced Predrag Bogdanović at Titan FC 82/ SBC 47: Revenge on June 2, 2023 for Titan FC Welterweight Championship and SBC Welterweight Championship. He won the bout via technical knockout in the fifth round.

==== Global Fight League ====
On December 11, 2024, it was announced that Brooks was eligible to be drafted in the Global Fight League. However, he was not drafted for the 2025 season. In turn, in April 2025, it was reported that all GFL events were cancelled indefinitely.

== Personal life ==
Brooks and his wife have a daughter.

== Championships and accomplishments ==
- Bellator MMA
  - Bellator Lightweight Championship (One time; former)
    - Two successful title defenses
  - Interim Bellator Lightweight Championship (One time; former)
  - Bellator Season Nine Lightweight Tournament winner
- Titan Fighting Championship
  - Titan FC Welterweight Championship (One time, current)
- Serbian Battle Championship
  - SBC Welterweight Championship (One time, current)

== Mixed martial arts record ==
Professional record breakdown
32 matches	26 wins	5 losses
By knockout	7	2
By submission	6	3
By decision	13	0
Draws	1	

Res.	Record	Opponent	Method	Event	Date	Round	Time	Location	Notes
Win	26–5–1	Predrag Bogdanović	TKO (elbows and punches)	Titan FC 82 / SBC 47	June 2, 2023	5	3:24	Novi Sad, Serbia	Won the vacant SBC and Titan FC Welterweight Championship.
Win	25–5–1	Jhonasky Sojo	Submission (rear-naked choke)	Titan FC 81	April 14, 2023	3	3:17	Santo Domingo, Dominican Republic	
Win	24–5–1	Luis Peña	Decision (split)	XMMA 5	July 23, 2022	3	5:00	Columbia, South Carolina, United States	Catchweight (160 lb) bout.
Win	23–5–1	Rafael Bastos	TKO (leg injury)	Art of Scrap 4	April 15, 2022	1	0:19	Fort Wayne, Indiana, United States	Catchweight (160 lb) bout.
Win	22–5–1	Jose Filho	Submission (rear-naked choke)	Art of Scrap 3	October 30, 2021	3	4:54	Fort Wayne, Indiana, United States	Catchweight (160 lb) bout.
Win	21–5–1	Steven Siler	Decision (unanimous)	XMMA 2: Saunders vs. Nijem	July 30, 2021	3	5:00	Greenville, South Carolina, United States	
Loss	20–5–1	Gleison Tibau	Technical Submission (guillotine choke)	Battlefield FC 2	July 27, 2019	1	3:34	Macau, SAR, China	
Draw	20–4–1	Rashid Magomedov	Draw (unanimous)	PFL 9	October 13, 2018	2	5:00	Long Beach, California, United States	2018 PFL Lightweight Quarterfinal bout. Eliminated via first round tiebreaker.
Win	20–4	Robert Watley	Decision (unanimous)	PFL 5	August 2, 2018	3	5:00	Uniondale, New York, United States	
Win	19–4	Luiz Firmino	Decision (unanimous)	PFL 2	June 21, 2018	3	5:00	Chicago, Illinois, United States	
Loss	18–4	Nik Lentz	Submission (guillotine choke)	UFC Fight Night: Werdum vs. Tybura	November 19, 2017	2	2:05	Sydney, Australia	
Loss	18–3	Charles Oliveira	Submission (rear-naked choke)	UFC 210	April 8, 2017	1	2:30	Buffalo, New York, United States	
Loss	18–2	Alex Oliveira	KO (punches)	UFC Fight Night: Lineker vs. Dodson	October 1, 2016	3	3:30	Portland, Oregon, United States	Catchweight (161.5 lbs) bout; Oliveira missed weight.
Win	18–1	Ross Pearson	Decision (unanimous)	The Ultimate Fighter: Team Joanna vs. Team Cláudia Finale	July 8, 2016	3	5:00	Las Vegas, Nevada, United States	
Win	17–1	Marcin Held	Decision (unanimous)	Bellator 145	November 6, 2015	5	5:00	St. Louis, Missouri, United States	Defended the Bellator Lightweight World Championship. Brooks vacated the title on May 14, 2016.
Win	16–1	Dave Jansen	Decision (unanimous)	Bellator 136	April 10, 2015	5	5:00	Irvine, California, United States	Defended the Bellator Lightweight World Championship.
Win	15–1	Michael Chandler	TKO (punches)	Bellator 131	November 15, 2014	4	3:48	San Diego, California, United States	Won the vacant Bellator Lightweight World Championship.
Win	14–1	Michael Chandler	Decision (split)	Bellator 120	May 17, 2014	5	5:00	Southaven, Mississippi, United States	Won the interim Bellator Lightweight World Championship.
Win	13–1	Alexander Sarnavskiy	Decision (unanimous)	Bellator 109	November 22, 2013	3	5:00	Bethlehem, Pennsylvania, United States	Won the Bellator Season 9 Lightweight Tournament.
Win	12–1	Saad Awad	Decision (unanimous)	Bellator 105	October 25, 2013	3	5:00	Rio Rancho, New Mexico, United States	Bellator Season 9 Lightweight Tournament Semifinal.
Win	11–1	John Alessio	Decision (unanimous)	Bellator 101	September 27, 2013	3	5:00	Portland, Oregon, United States	Bellator Season 9 Lightweight Tournament Quarterfinal.
Win	10–1	Cris Leyva	TKO (punches)	Bellator 97	July 31, 2013	3	2:20	Rio Rancho, New Mexico, United States	
Loss	9–1	Saad Awad	KO (punches)	Bellator 91	February 28, 2013	1	0:43	Rio Rancho, New Mexico, United States	Bellator Season 8 Lightweight Tournament Semifinal.
Win	9–0	Ricardo Tirloni	Decision (unanimous)	Bellator 87	January 31, 2013	3	5:00	Mount Pleasant, Michigan, United States	Bellator Season 8 Lightweight Tournament Quarterfinal.
Win	8–0	Satoru Kitaoka	TKO (punches)	DREAM 18	December 31, 2012	2	3:46	Saitama, Japan	
Win	7–0	Drew Dober	Decision (unanimous)	Disorderly Conduct: The Yin & The Yang	August 10, 2012	3	5:00	Omaha, Nebraska, United States	
Win	6–0	Tory Bogguess	TKO (punches)	XFO 44	June 16, 2012	1	4:20	Hoffman Estates, Illinois, United States	
Win	5–0	Ryan Bixler	Submission (rear-naked choke)	Chicago Cagefighting Championship IV	October 15, 2011	2	1:00	Villa Park, Illinois, United States	
Win	4–0	Joseph Richardson	Submission (armbar)	XFO 41	September 3, 2011	1	3:49	Island Lake, Illinois, United States	
Win	3–0	Bobby Reardanz	Submission (armbar)	XFO 39	May 13, 2011	3	3:22	Hoffman Estates, Illinois, United States	
Win	2–0	Guillermo Serment	Submission (rear-naked choke)	Chicago Cagefighting Championship III	March 5, 2011	2	0:45	Villa Park, Illinois, United States	
Win	1–0	J.R. Hines	TKO (punches)	XFO 38	January 22, 2011	1	2:09	Woodstock, Illinois, United States	

== See also ==
- List of Bellator MMA alumni
- List of current mixed martial arts champions
- List of male mixed martial artists
