= Brandon Halsey =

American mixed martial arts fighter

- Born: September 16, 1986 (age 40); San Diego, California, United States
- Other names: Bull
- Height: 6 ft 0 in (1.83 m)
- Weight: 185 lb (84 kg; 13 st 3 lb)
- Division: Middleweight; Light Heavyweight
- Reach: 72 in (183 cm)
- Stance: Orthodox
- Fighting out of: Costa Mesa, California, United States
- Team: American Gym; HB Ultimate Training Center
- Wrestling: NCAA Division I Wrestling
- Years active: 2012–present

Mixed martial arts record
- Total: 17
- Wins: 12
- By knockout: 3
- By submission: 4
- By decision: 5
- Losses: 5
- By knockout: 4
- By submission: 1

Other information
- Mixed martial arts record from Sherdog

Brandon Halsey (born September 16, 1986) is an American professional mixed martial artist formerly competing in the Light Heavyweight division of the Professional Fighters League. A professional competitor since 2012, he has formerly competed for M-1 Global and Bellator, where he was the Middleweight Champion.

== Background ==
Originally from San Diego, California, Halsey began his career in combat sports from a young age as a wrestler and judoka. Halsey's father wrestled at UCLA and Halsey has two brothers who also competed at NCAA Division I colleges. Halsey attended Rancho Buena Vista High School where he competed in wrestling and excelled. He won a CIF state championship, and finished with the best overall record in school history with 150-16 and 80 pins. Halsey also competed in football as a linebacker and earned First Team All-San Diego County honors. Halsey originally attended Fresno State University, transferring to California State University at Bakersfield his sophomore year after Fresno State dropped their wrestling program. Halsey was very successful at CSUB, finishing 7th at the NCAA Division 1 National Championships and earning NCAA Division 1 All-American honors. Halsey specialized in folkstyle wrestling.

== Mixed martial arts career ==
=== Early career ===
Halsey made his professional debut in 2012 against Chris Golz. Halsey won the bout via submission in the first round.

In his second fight, Halsey faced UFC veteran Shonie Carter. Halsey won the bout via unanimous decision.

=== Bellator MMA ===
After winning his first two fights, Halsey was signed by Bellator Fighting Championships and made his debut against Rocky Ramirez at Bellator 92 on March 7, 2013. Halsey won by technical submission in the third round.

Halsey fought Joe Yager at Bellator 96 on June 19, 2013, and won the bout via split decision.

Halsey faced UFC veteran Hector Ramirez at Bellator 106 on November 2, 2013. Halsey won the bout via TKO in the first round after using his superior wrestling to take the fight to the ground, transition immediately to the back, and unload with punches to the head until he earned the victory.

==== Season Ten Middleweight Tournament winner ====
In March 2014, Halsey entered into the Bellator Season Ten middleweight tournament when Dan Cramer versus Jeremy Kimball was cancelled. He fought Joe Pacheco at Bellator 116 on April 11, 2014. Halsey won the bout via unanimous decision. Halsey was scheduled to face Brett Cooper in the finals at Bellator 119 on May 9, 2014. The bout, however, was delayed due to an injury sustained by Cooper. The Cooper fight took place at Bellator 122 on July 25, 2014. Halsey won the bout via submission in the first round.

==== Middleweight Champion ====
Halsey faced Alexander Shlemenko for the Bellator Middleweight Championship on September 26, 2014, at Bellator 126. Halsey won the bout via technical submission in the first round to become the new Bellator Middleweight Champion.

Halsey was expected to make his first title defense against Kendall Grove on May 15, 2015, at Bellator 137. However, Halsey failed to make weight and was subsequently stripped of the middleweight championship. Halsey won the fight via TKO in the fourth round.

Halsey next faced Rafael Carvalho for the vacant Bellator Middleweight Championship on October 23, 2015, at Bellator 144. After dominating the opening round with his grappling, Halsey lost the fight via TKO in the second after absorbing a kick to the liver.

Halsey faced John Salter on June 17, 2016, at Bellator 156. After sustaining an early cut via head kick, Halsey went on to lose the bout via submission in the first round.

On October 5, 2016, Halsey was released from Bellator.

=== M-1 Global ===
On June 1, 2017, Halsey rematched Alexander Shlemenko at M-1 Challenge 79 and was submitted by strikes after 25 seconds of the first round, marking his third consecutive loss after starting his career 9-0.

He then face Mikhail Ragozin on September 23, 2017, at M-1 Challenge 83: Ragozin vs. Halsey. He won the fight via unanimous decision.

== Personal life ==
Halsey and his wife Amber gave birth to their first child, daughter Savannah Rose, in June 2015.

== Championships and accomplishments ==
- Bellator MMA
  - Bellator Middleweight World Championship (One time)
  - Bellator Season Ten Middleweight Tournament Winner

== Mixed martial arts record ==
Professional record breakdown
17 matches	12 wins	5 losses
By knockout	3	4
By submission	4	1
By decision	5	0

Res.	Record	Opponent	Method	Event	Date	Round	Time	Location	Notes
Lose	12–5	Jiří Procházka	TKO (submission to punches)	Rizin 14	December 31, 2018	1	6:30	Saitama, Japan	
Win	12–4	Ronny Markes	Decision (unanimous)	PFL 9 (2018)	October 13, 2018	2	5:00	Long Beach, California, United States	2018 PFL Light Heavyweight Tournament Alternate bout.
Loss	11–4	Vinny Magalhães	TKO (punches)	PFL 5 (2018)	August 2, 2018	1	1:34	Uniondale, New York, United States	
Win	11–3	Smealinho Rama	TKO (doctor stoppage)	PFL 2 (2018)	June 21, 2018	2	5:00	Chicago, Illinois, United States	
Win	10–3	Mikhail Ragozin	Decision (unanimous)	M-1 Challenge 83	September 24, 2017	3	5:00	Kazan, Russia	Return to Light Heavyweight.
Loss	9–3	Alexander Shlemenko	TKO (kick to the body and punches)	M-1 Challenge 79	June 1, 2017	1	0:25	Saint Petersburg, Russia	
Loss	9–2	John Salter	Submission (triangle choke)	Bellator 156	June 17, 2016	1	4:03	Fresno, California, United States	
Loss	9–1	Rafael Carvalho	KO (body kick)	Bellator 144	October 23, 2015	2	1:42	Uncasville, Connecticut, United States	For the vacant Bellator Middleweight World Championship.
Win	9–0	Kendall Grove	TKO (punches)	Bellator 137	May 15, 2015	4	2:25	Temecula, California, United States	Halsey missed weight (188 lb) and was stripped of the Bellator Middleweight World Championship. Only Grove was eligible to win the title.
Win	8–0	Alexander Shlemenko	Technical Submission (rear-naked choke)	Bellator 126	September 26, 2014	1	0:35	Phoenix, Arizona, United States	Won the Bellator Middleweight World Championship.
Win	7–0	Brett Cooper	Submission (armbar)	Bellator 122	July 25, 2014	1	2:09	Temecula, California, United States	Won the Bellator Season Ten Middleweight Tournament.
Win	6–0	Joe Pacheco	Decision (unanimous)	Bellator 116	April 11, 2014	3	5:00	Temecula, California, United States	Middleweight debut. Bellator Season Ten Middleweight Tournament Semifinal.
Win	5–0	Hector Ramirez	TKO (punches)	Bellator 106	November 2, 2013	1	0:52	Long Beach, California, United States	
Win	4–0	Joe Yager	Decision (split)	Bellator 96	June 19, 2013	3	5:00	Thackerville, Oklahoma, United States	
Win	3–0	Rocky Ramirez	Technical Submission (arm-triangle choke)	Bellator 92	March 7, 2013	3	0:50	Temecula, California, United States	
Win	2–0	Shonie Carter	Decision (unanimous)	KOTC: Reckless Abandon	February 2, 2012	3	5:00	Highland, California, United States	
Win	1–0	Chris Golz	Submission (rear-naked choke)	Respect in the Cage	January 21, 2012	1	1:46	Pomona, California, United States	Light Heavyweight debut.

== See also ==
- List of Bellator MMA alumni
- List of male mixed martial artists
