= Jason Butcher =

American mixed martial arts fighter

- Born: October 23, 1984 (age 41); Lincoln County, West Virginia, U.S.
- Height: 6 ft 3 in (191 cm)
- Weight: 205 lb (93 kg; 14.6 st)
- Division: Middleweight; Light Heavyweight
- Reach: 74 in (188 cm)
- Stance: Orthodox
- Fighting out of: Huntington, West Virginia, United States
- Team: Team Ground Zero / CSA
- Rank: Black belt in Brazilian Jiu-Jitsu
- Years active: 2008–present

Mixed martial arts record
- Total: 21
- Wins: 15
- By knockout: 7
- By submission: 8
- Losses: 6
- By knockout: 3
- By submission: 1
- By decision: 2

Other information
- Mixed martial arts record from Sherdog

Jason Butcher (born October 23, 1984) is an American mixed martial artist currently competing in the Light Heavyweight division of the Professional Fighters League. A professional competitor since 2008, he has also competed for Bellator and King of the Cage, where he is the current Light Heavyweight Champion.

== Mixed martial arts career ==
=== Amateur career ===
In December 2009, Butcher fought for the North American Allied Fight Series amateur Light Heavyweight Championship against Dane Bonnigson. He lost via referee stoppage due to strikes.

Butcher compiled an amateur record of 4–2 before moving into professional mixed martial arts.

=== Early professional career ===
Butcher started his professional career in 2011. He fought exclusively for the Kentucky-based promotion, Spartan Fighting Championship.

Butcher won three times in a row, including first round victories over fellow prospects Jared Combs and Dominique Steele. In 2012, Butcher signed with Bellator.

=== Bellator Fighting Championships ===
Butcher made his debut on June 22, 2012, at Bellator 71 against Duane Bastress. He won via submission early in the first round.

Butcher faced Shaun Asher on October 26, 2012, at Bellator 78. He won via submission in the first round.

Butcher faced Jack Hermansson on March 21, 2013, at Bellator 93. For the fifth time in a row he won via submission in the first round.

Butcher faced Giva Santana on September 7, 2013, at Bellator 98 in the quarterfinal match of Bellator Season Nine Middleweight Tournament. After losing the first round, Butcher rebounded and won the fight via TKO in the second round.

Butcher faced Mikkel Parlo in the semifinal on October 4, 2013, at Bellator 102. He lost the fight via unanimous decision (30–27, 29–28, 29–28).

Butcher faced Andreas Michailidis at Bellator 128 on October 10, 2014. He won the fight via TKO in the second round.

Butcher faced Tamdan McCrory at Bellator 134 on February 27, 2015. He lost the fight via submission in the first round.

== Championships and accomplishments ==
- B2 Fighting Series
  - B2FS Light Heavyweight Championship (One time)
- Hardrock MMA
  - HRMMA Light Heavyweight Championship (One time)
- King of the Cage
  - KOTC Light Heavyweight Championship (One time)

== Mixed martial arts record ==
Professional record breakdown
21 matches	15 wins	6 losses
By knockout	7	3
By submission	8	1
By decision	0	2

Res.	Record	Opponent	Method	Event	Date	Round	Time	Location	Notes
Loss	15–6	Kevem Felipe	TKO (punches)	Urijah Faber's A1 Combat 22	July 20, 2024	1	3:53	Sacramento, California, United States	For the vacant A1 Combat Middleweight Championship.
Win	15–5	Doug Usher	KO (punches)	B2 Fighting Series 183	May 27, 2023	1	0:21	Columbus, Georgia, United States	Won the vacant B2FS Middleweight Championship.
Win	14–5	Chris Warf	Submission (triangle choke)	ECC Cage Fighting: Cage Wars 3	November 19, 2022	1	0:56	Ashland, Kentucky, United States	Won the NP Middleweight Championship.
Loss	13–5	Dequan Townsend	Decision (unanimous)	B2 Fighting Series 154	April 2, 2022	5	5:00	Novi, Michigan, United States	Lost the B2FS Light Heavyweight Championship.
Win	13–4	Karl Williams	Submission (triangle choke)	B2 Fighting Series 142	December 4, 2021	1	1:38	Lexington, Kentucky, United States	Won the B2FS Light Heavyweight Championship.
Win	12–4	Gabriel Mota	Submission (triangle choke)	HR MMA 121	May 8, 2021	1	2:38	Covington, Kentucky, United States	Won the vacant HRMMA Light Heavyweight Championship.
Loss	11–4	Emiliano Sordi	KO (punch)	PFL 7	August 30, 2018	1	0:16	Atlantic City, New Jersey, United States	
Loss	11–3	Maxim Grishin	TKO (leg injury)	PFL 2	June 21, 2018	1	1:41	Chicago, Illinois, United States	
Win	11–2	Jesse Murray	KO (punches)	KOTC: Locked In	October 28, 2017	1	2:42	Philadelphia, Pennsylvania, United States	Defended KOTC Light Heavyweight Championship.
Win	10–2	William Hill	TKO	KOTC: Violent Confrontation	March 3, 2017	1	2:07	Carlton, Minnesota, United States	Won the vacant KOTC Light Heavyweight Championship.
Win	9–2	Robert Morrow	KO (punches)	KOTC: Harm's Way	September 17, 2016	1	1:01	Washington, Pennsylvania, United States	
Loss	8–2	Tamdan McCrory	Submission (armbar)	Bellator 134	February 27, 2015	1	1:06	Uncasville, Connecticut, United States	
Win	8–1	Andreas Michailidis	TKO (punches)	Bellator 128	October 10, 2014	2	0:28	Thackerville, Oklahoma, United States	
Loss	7–1	Mikkel Parlo	Decision (unanimous)	Bellator 102	October 4, 2013	3	5:00	Visalia, California, United States	Bellator Season Nine Middleweight Tournament Semifinal.
Win	7–0	Giva Santana	TKO (punches)	Bellator 98	September 7, 2013	2	1:12	Uncasville, Connecticut, United States	Bellator Season Nine Middleweight Tournament Quarterfinal.
Win	6–0	Jack Hermansson	Submission (triangle choke)	Bellator 93	March 21, 2013	1	2:24	Lewiston, Maine, United States	
Win	5–0	Shaun Asher	Submission (guillotine choke)	Bellator 78	October 26, 2012	1	1:32	Dayton, Ohio, United States	
Win	4–0	Duane Bastress	Submission (triangle choke)	Bellator 71	June 22, 2012	1	1:03	Chester, West Virginia, United States	Middleweight debut.
Win	3–0	Jared Combs	Submission (triangle choke)	Spartan FC 11: Destruction	January 13, 2012	1	3:00	Ashland, Kentucky, United States	195 lb. Catchweight bout
Win	2–0	Lamont Stafford	Submission (armbar)	Spartan FC 8: Onslaught	May 7, 2011	1	1:45	Ashland, Kentucky, United States	
Win	1–0	Dominique Steele	KO (punch)	Spartan FC 7: Locked and Loaded	February 25, 2011	1	0:45	Lexington, Kentucky, United States	

=== Mixed martial arts amateur record ===
Res.	Record	Opponent	Method	Event	Date	Round	Time	Location	Notes
Loss	4–2	Mike King	Decision (unanimous)	NAAFS: Caged Vengeance 8	September 24, 2010	3	3:00	Columbus, Ohio, United States	
Win	4–1	Anthony DiPiero	Submission (anaconda choke)	NAAFS: Rock N Rumble 4	August 28, 2010	1	0:51	Cleveland, Ohio, United States	
Loss	3–1	Dane Bonnigson	TKO (punches)	NAAFS: Night of Champions 2009	December 5, 2009	1	0:14	Akron, Ohio, United States	For NAAFS Amateur Light Heavyweight Championship.
Win	3–0	Dan Spohn	Submission (rear-naked choke)	NAAFS: Caged Fury 7	October 9, 2009	2	1:38	Cleveland, Ohio, United States	
Win	2–0	Phillip Clark Jr.	TKO (punches)	NAAFS: Caged Vengeance 6	September 19, 2009	1	1:26	Columbus, Ohio, United States	
Win	1–0	Vincent Antinore	Submission (punches)	UVC 1: Rumble on the River	July 12, 2008	1	1:23	Portsmouth, Ohio, United States	

== Submission grappling record ==
? Matches, ? Wins (? Submissions), ? Losses (? Submissions), ? Draws
Result	Rec.	Opponent	Method	Event	Division	Date	Location
Win	5–6–0	(United States) Luke Ljuba		Fight 2 Win Pro 202		May 21, 2021	Austin, Texas, United States
Loss	4–6–0	(Brazil) Diego Ramalho	Toe hold	Fight 2 Win Pro 167		March 20, 2021	Austin, Texas, United States
Loss	4–5–0	(United States) Sebastian Black	Heel Hook	Fight 2 Win Pro 151	200 lbs	September 11, 2020	Dallas, Texas, United States
Win	4–4–0	(United States) Richard Flores	Triangle Armbar	Fight 2 Win Pro 135	200 lbs	January 18, 2020	Sacramento, California, United States
Win	3–4–0	(United States) Dave Anderson	Choke	Fight 2 Win Pro 131	195 lbs	November 10, 2019	Richmond, California, United States
Loss	2–4–0	(United States) Kaniela Kahuanui	Choke	Fight 2 Win 125	175 lbs	September 13, 2019	San Jose, California, United States
Loss	2–3–0	(Brazil) Gustavo Andrade	Decision(split)	Fight 2 Win 116	200 lbs	June 22, 2019	Richmond, California, United States
Loss	2–2–0	(United States) Robert Yamashita	Armbar	Fight 2 Win Pro 103		March 1, 2019	Houston, Texas, United States
Win	2–1–0	(United States) Felipe Bragio	Triangle choke	Fight 2 Win Pro 97		January 12, 2019	Sacramento, California, United States
Win	1–1–0	(United States) Omar Kasdi	Triangle choke	Fight 2 Win Pro 62		February 10, 2018	Sacramento, California, United States
Loss	0–1–0	(United States) Tanner Rice	Armbar	Fight 2 Win Pro 57		December 9, 2017	Sacramento, California, United States
