= Sean O'Connell (fighter) =

American mixed martial arts fighter

- Born: Sean O'Connell; September 2, 1983 (age 43); Cottage Grove, Minnesota, United States
- Other names: The Real OC
- Nationality: American
- Height: 6 ft 1 in (1.85 m)
- Weight: 205 lb (93 kg; 14 st 9 lb)
- Division: Light Heavyweight; Heavyweight
- Reach: 74 in (188 cm)
- Stance: Orthodox
- Fighting out of: Salt Lake City, Utah, United States
- Team: Jeremy Horn's Elite Performance
- Trainer: Jeremy Horn
- Years active: 2007–2019

Mixed martial arts record
- Total: 31
- Wins: 21
- By knockout: 12
- By submission: 3
- By decision: 6
- Losses: 10
- By knockout: 6
- By submission: 2
- By decision: 2

Other information
- Mixed martial arts record from Sherdog

Sean O'Connell (born September 2, 1983) is an American former professional mixed martial artist who most recently competed and won a title in the Light Heavyweight division of the Professional Fighters League (PFL). A professional competitor since 2007, O'Connell has formerly competed for the Ultimate Fighting Championship and Maximum Fighting Championship. He currently serves as a commentator for the PFL.

Sean is also known for his "antics" pre-fight, in which he demonstrates comedic comradery with his opponent.

== Background ==
Originally from Cottage Grove, Minnesota, O'Connell competed in football and wrestling at Jordan High School in Sandy, Utah before continuing his football career collegiately. While in high school O'Connell was a member of the coveted football group Pain Train, which was reserved for only the toughest members of the offensive line. However, O'Connell would transfer to three different schools including Southern Utah University and The University of Utah where he made the team as a walk-on, while looking to get more playing time. O'Connell turned his attention to mixed martial arts to supplement his Football training. O'Connell graduated from The University of Utah, with a degree in psychology. He also attended Weber State.

== Mixed martial arts career ==
=== Early career ===
O'Connell made his professional MMA debut in 2007 with no striking training other than cardio kickboxing which he would do to help stay in shape. Despite having limited training, O'Connell was successful early on in his career and held an overall record of 6–2, which earned him an invitation to compete on The Ultimate Fighter: Team Nogueira vs. Team Mir. O'Connell, however, was eliminated in the opening round to make it to the final cast. O'Connell, who also ran a sports talk show for a radio station in San Francisco at the time was on a five-fight winning streak and held an overall professional record of 14–4, before inviting UFC president Dana White to come onto his show. O'Connell asked White for a contract live on air and was signed a year later. O'Connell was the co-host of a popular sports talk radio show on ESPN700 in Utah called The OC and Hackett Show

=== Ultimate Fighting Championship ===
O'Connell made his promotional debut as a short notice injury replacement at The Ultimate Fighter Nations Finale on April 16, 2014, against Ryan Jimmo. O'Connell was defeated via knockout in the first round.

His next appearance was also a short notice fight against Gian Villante on June 28, 2014, at UFC Fight Night 43, where he replaced an injured Anthony Perosh. O'Connell lost the fight via split decision. Their performance earned both participants Fight of the Night honors.

On January 18, 2015, O'Connell then faced Matt Van Buren at UFC Fight Night 59. he won via third-round TKO. Both participants earned Fight of the Night honors on the same card as Conor McGregor. He then faced Anthony Perosh on May 10, 2015, at UFC Fight Night 65. He won the fight via TKO in the first round.

O'Connell is well known for his weigh-in antics before professional fights. This became his signature as video circulation of his UFC weigh-ins boosted viewership. Goofs include booping Matt Van Buren on the nose or playing an improvised game of rock-paper-scissors with Perosh. He claims he does his jokes to add levity to an otherwise tense situation.

O'Connell faced Ilir Latifi on January 17, 2016, at UFC Fight Night 81. He lost the fight by knockout in the first round.

O'Connell next faced Steve Bossé on June 18, 2016, at UFC Fight Night 89. Bossé was awarded a unanimous decision victory. The back and forth action earned both participants Fight of the Night honors.

O'Connell faced Corey Anderson on December 9, 2016, at UFC Fight Night 102. He lost the fight by TKO in the second round.

=== Professional Fighters League ===
O'Connell signed with PFL in 2018. In his debut, he faced Ronny Markes at PFL 2 on June 21, 2018, in Chicago, Illinois, winning the fight by TKO in the second round.

In his second fight for the promotion, O'Connell faced Bozigit Ataev at PFL 7 on August 30, 2018. He lost the fight via TKO in the first round.

In the fall of 2018, O'Connell entered the PFL Light Heavyweight tournament. At PFL 9 on October 13, 2018, he defeated Daniel Spohn by majority decision in the quarterfinal round and then fought Smealinho Rama in the semifinal round the same night, winning by knockout. O'Connell faced Vinny Magalhães in the finals at PFL 11 on December 31, 2018. He won the back-and-forth fight via TKO between the third and fourth round after Vinny Magalhães stopped the bout. With the win, O'Connell was crowned the 2018 PFL Light Heavyweight champion and earned the $1 million cash prize. Of note O’Connell worked as a broadcaster for the PFL commentating cage-side once on the same night as one of his own fights. O’Connell was hired as part of the Professional Fighters League broadcast team after his retirement as cage-side play by play announcer.

=== Retirement ===
Following his 2018 PFL tournament win, O'Connell announced he was retiring from MMA competition.

== Championships and accomplishments ==
=== Mixed martial arts ===
- Professional Fighters League
  - 2018 Light Heavyweight Champion
- Ultimate Fighting Championship
  - Fight of the Night (Three times) vs. Gian Villante, Matt Van Buren, & Steve Bossé
  - UFC.com Awards
    - 2016: Ranked #4 Fight of the Year vs. Steve Bossé

== Mixed martial arts record ==
Professional record breakdown
31 matches	21 wins	10 losses
By knockout	12	6
By submission	3	2
By decision	6	2

Res.	Record	Opponent	Method	Event	Date	Round	Time	Location	Notes
Win	21–10	Vinny Magalhães	TKO (corner stoppage)	PFL 11	December 31, 2018	3	5:00	New York City, New York, United States	Won the 2018 PFL Light Heavyweight Tournament.
Win	20–10	Smealinho Rama	KO (punches)	PFL 9	October 13, 2018	1	1:45	Long Beach, California, United States	2018 PFL Light Heavyweight Semifinal bout.
Win	19–10	Daniel Spohn	Decision (majority)	PFL 9	October 13, 2018	2	5:00	Long Beach, California, United States	2018 PFL Light Heavyweight Quarterfinal bout.
Loss	18–10	Bozigit Ataev	TKO (spinning back kick and punches)	PFL 7	August 30, 2018	1	3:30	Atlantic City, New Jersey, United States	
Win	18–9	Ronny Markes	TKO (punches)	PFL 2	June 21, 2018	2	0:41	Chicago, Illinois, United States	
Loss	17–9	Corey Anderson	TKO (punches)	UFC Fight Night: Lewis vs. Abdurakhimov	December 9, 2016	2	2:36	Albany, New York, United States	
Loss	17–8	Steve Bossé	Decision (unanimous)	UFC Fight Night: MacDonald vs. Thompson	June 18, 2016	3	5:00	Ottawa, Ontario, Canada	Fight of the Night.
Loss	17–7	Ilir Latifi	KO (punches)	UFC Fight Night: Dillashaw vs. Cruz	January 17, 2016	1	0:30	Boston, Massachusetts, United States	
Win	17–6	Anthony Perosh	TKO (punches)	UFC Fight Night: Miocic vs. Hunt	May 10, 2015	1	0:56	Adelaide, Australia	
Win	16–6	Matt Van Buren	TKO (punches)	UFC Fight Night: McGregor vs. Siver	January 18, 2015	3	2:11	Boston, Massachusetts, United States	Fight of the Night.
Loss	15–6	Gian Villante	Decision (split)	UFC Fight Night: Te Huna vs. Marquardt	June 28, 2014	3	5:00	Auckland, New Zealand	Fight of the Night.
Loss	15–5	Ryan Jimmo	KO (punches)	The Ultimate Fighter Nations Finale: Bisping vs. Kennedy	April 16, 2014	1	4:27	Quebec City, Quebec, Canada	
Win	15–4	Markhaile Wedderburn	Submission (rear-naked choke)	MFC 39	January 17, 2014	1	1:48	Edmonton, Alberta, Canada	
Win	14–4	Marvin Eastman	Decision (unanimous)	Showdown Fights 12	September 28, 2013	3	5:00	Orem, Utah, United States	
Win	13–4	Chris Guillen	TKO (punches)	Showdown Fights 9	November 16, 2012	3	0:21	Orem, Utah, United States	
Win	12–4	Kip Ramos	TKO (punches)	Showdown Fights 7	May 4, 2012	1	0:33	Orem, Utah, United States	Light Heavyweight debut.
Win	11–4	Trevor Carlson	Decision (unanimous)	Showdown Fights 6	February 24, 2012	3	5:00	Orem, Utah, United States	
Win	10–4	Ben Fuimaono	TKO (punches)	Fight Night: Explosion	June 10, 2011	1	4:34	Salt Lake City, Utah, United States	
Loss	9–4	Joseph Henle	Submission (rear-naked choke)	ZarMMA: Fight Night	November 12, 2010	2	1:15	Layton, Utah, United States	
Win	9–3	Tony King	Decision (unanimous)	UFO: Rumble at the Races	July 24, 2010	3	5:00	Kennewick, Washington, United States	
Win	8–3	Dwight Parker	Submission (rear-naked choke)	WCFC: World Championship Full Contact	April 3, 2010	2	1:49	Salt Lake City, Utah, United States	
Loss	7–3	Jordan Smith	Submission (rear-naked choke)	Throwdown Showdown 3	February 20, 2009	1	2:30	Salt Lake City, Utah, United States	
Win	7–2	Hank Weiss	Decision	Jeremy Horn's Elite Fight Night 5	November 14, 2008	3	5:00	Layton, Utah, United States	
Loss	6–2	Hank Weiss	KO (punches)	Jeremy Horn's Elite Fight Night 1	April 5, 2008	2	0:08	Layton, Utah, United States	
Win	6–1	Lima Pule	Submission (rear-naked choke)	UCE: Worlds Collide	December 1, 2007	2	3:28	Salt Lake City, Utah, United States	
Win	5–1	Lima Pule	Decision (majority)	UCE: Episode 6	November 10, 2007	3		Salt Lake City, Utah, United States	
Win	4–1	David Thomas	TKO (punches)	UCE: Episode 6	August 18, 2007	2	2:44	Salt Lake City, Utah, United States	
Loss	3–1	Kevin Hill	TKO (punches)	UCE: Episode 1	July 14, 2007	1	0:47	Salt Lake City, Utah, United States	
Win	3–0	Eric Wenzel	TKO (punches)	UCE: Finals	June 16, 2007	1	1:24	Salt Lake City, Utah United States	
Win	2–0	Kenneth Wirfs	KO (punches)	UCE: Episode 7	May 19, 2007	1	0:37	Salt Lake City, Utah, United States	
Win	1–0	Jason Delrio	KO (punches)	UCE: Episode 2	April 13, 2007	1	0:36	Salt Lake City, Utah, United States	

== See also ==
- List of current UFC fighters
- List of male mixed martial artists
