= Smealinho Rama =

Greek mixed martial arts fighter

Apostolis "Smealinho" Rama
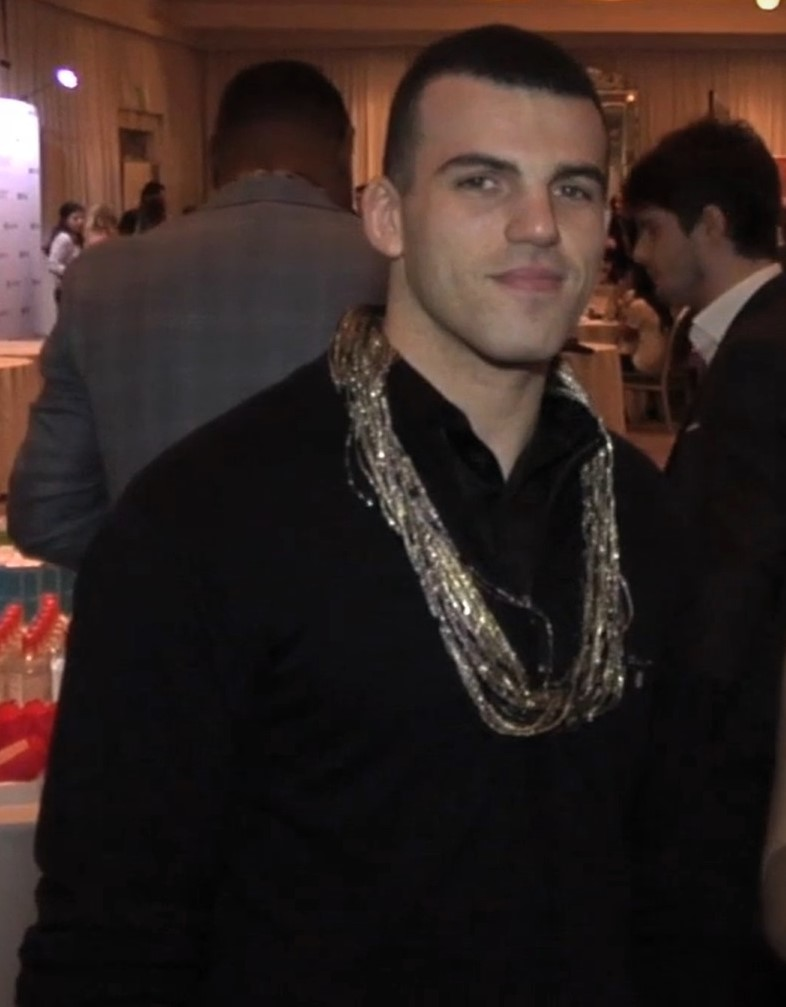
- Rama in 2017
- Born: Αποστόλης Ράμα; April 30, 1992 (age 34); Athens, Greece
- Other names: The Prince
- Nationality: Canadian
- Height: 6 ft 1 in (1.85 m)
- Weight: 265 lb (120 kg; 18 st 13 lb)
- Division: Light Heavyweight; Heavyweight
- Reach: 78 in (200 cm)
- Stance: Southpaw
- Fighting out of: New York City, New York, U.S.
- Team: Goldenstars Boxing; Renzo Gracie Jiu-Jitsu
- Years active: 2012–2018

Mixed martial arts record
- Total: 17
- Wins: 11
- By knockout: 7
- By submission: 3
- By decision: 1
- Losses: 5
- By knockout: 3
- By submission: 1
- By decision: 1
- Draws: 1

Other information
- Mixed martial arts record from Sherdog

Apostolis "Smealinho" Rama (born April 30, 1992) is a Greek-born Canadian former mixed martial artist who competed in the Light Heavyweight division. He competed in the Professional Fighters League, where he was the WSOF Heavyweight Champion, and also competed in the MFC.

== Mixed martial arts career ==
=== Maximum Fighting Championship ===
Rama made his MFC debut against Canadian Lee Mein at MFC 34: Total Recall. Rama was superior and won by technical knockout in the first round.

Then Rama made a fight in the BFTB, facing Jordan Tracey, in Battle for the Border 1: Blue Plates Vs. Red Plates, and won with a kimura in the first round.

His return to MFC was against Canadian Ryan Fortin at MFC 35: Explosive Encounter. Rama won the first round finals.

At MFC 36, Rama faced Mike Hackert, and knocked him out in the first round.

With a six-game winning streak in MMA, three in MFC, Rama played MFC's Heavyweight Heavyweight belt against future UFC fighter Anthony Hamilton. Rama was knocked out early in the second round with a kick in the head, losing his unbeaten record.

=== World Series of Fighting/Professional Fighters League ===
Rama made his debut on WSOF against Steve Mocco on February 21, 2014, at WSOF Canada 1: Ford vs. Powell. Rama dominated the fight and won by unanimous decision.

Rama won a fight in the Unified MMA against UFC veteran Tim Hague and returned to the WSOF to contest the WSOF Heavyweight Championship on October 11, 2014, against Derrick Mehmen. He knocked out the American with 51 seconds of fighting and won the title.

His first defense was against Blagoi Ivanov, on WSOF 21, on June 5, 2015. Rama was submitted with a guillotine in the third round and lost his belt.

After the loss, Rama decided to go down to light heavyweight, and succeeded, as in his next bout he knocked out Jake Heun in the second round on December 31, 2016, at WSOF 34.

Rama faced the Brazilian Ronny Markes on PFL Daytona on June 30, 2017, event that marked the debut of the Professional Fighters League, which was formerly known as World Series of Fighting. Rama lost by unanimous decision.

In June 2018, Rama entered the PFL Light Heavyweight Tournament. He faced Brandon Halsey in the opening round at PFL 2 on June 21, 2018. He lost the fight via TKO in the third round when the fight was stopped by the cage side doctor due to a cut Rama suffered.

In his second fight in the tournament, Rama faced Jamie Abdallah at PFL 7 on August 30, 2018. He won the fight via TKO between the second and third rounds when the doctor deemed Abdallah unable to continue due to swelling under his left eye. The win allowed Rama to advance to the next phase of the tournament.

Rama was set to face Bellator vet Jordan Young on April 29, 2021, at PFL 2 as the start of the 2021 PFL Light Heavyweight tournament. At the beginning of April, Rama was replaced by Vinny Magalhães for the whole season.

== Championships and Accomplishments ==
- World Series of Fighting - Professional Fighters League
  - WSOF Heavyweight Championship (One time) - Rama breaks all time record for Youngest Heavyweight Champion in the History of MMA in a major organization (WSOF/PFL) (22 years, 5 months, 1 week, 4 days) - Previously held by Frank Mir (UFC) (25 years, 3 weeks, 5 days)
  - 2017 Top Light-Heavyweight Prospect
  - 2012 Rookie of the Year
  - 2012 MFC Submission of the Year

== Mixed martial arts record ==
Professional record breakdown
17 matches	11 wins	5 losses
By knockout	7	3
By submission	3	1
By decision	1	1
Draws	1	

Res.	Record	Opponent	Method	Event	Date	Round	Time	Location	Notes
Loss	11–5–1	Sean O'Connell	KO (punches)	PFL 9 (2018)	October 13, 2018	1	1:45	Long Beach, California, United States	2018 PFL Light Heavyweight Semifinal bout.
Draw	11–4–1	Maxim Grishin	Draw (majority)	PFL 9 (2018)	October 13, 2018	2	5:00	Long Beach, California, United States	2018 PFL Light Heavyweight Quarterfinal bout. Advanced via first round tiebreaker.
Win	11–4	Jamie Abdallah	TKO (doctor stoppage)	PFL 7 (2018)	August 30, 2018	2	5:00	Atlantic City, New Jersey, United States	
Loss	10-4	Brandon Halsey	TKO (doctor stoppage)	PFL 2 (2018)	June 21, 2018	3	0:01	Chicago, Illinois, United States	
Loss	10-3	Ronny Markes	Decision (unanimous)	PFL: Daytona	June 30, 2017	3	5:00	Daytona Beach, Florida, United States	
Win	10-2	Jake Heun	TKO (punches)	WSOF 34	December 31, 2016	2	3:30	New York City, New York, United States	Light Heavyweight debut.
Loss	9-2	Blagoy Ivanov	Submission (guillotine choke)	WSOF 21	June 5, 2015	3	1:17	Edmonton, Alberta, Canada	Lost the WSOF Heavyweight Championship.
Win	9-1	Derrick Mehmen	TKO (punches)	WSOF 14	October 11, 2014	1	0:51	Edmonton, Alberta, Canada	Won the inaugural WSOF Heavyweight Championship.
Win	8-1	Tim Hague	TKO (punches)	Unified - MMA 19	May 23, 2014	1	1:41	Edmonton, Alberta, Canada	
Win	7-1	Steve Mocco	Decision (unanimous)	World Series of Fighting Canada 1: Ford vs. Powell	February 21, 2014	3	5:00	Edmonton, Alberta, Canada	
Loss	6-1	Anthony Hamilton	KO (head kick)	MFC 38: Behind Enemy Lines	October 4, 2013	2	0:12	Edmonton, Alberta, Canada	For MFC Heavyweight Championship
Win	6-0	Mike Hackert	KO (punches)	MFC 35: Reality Check	February 15, 2013	1	2:28	Edmonton, Alberta, Canada	
Win	5-0	Ryan Fortin	Submission (rear-naked choke)	MFC 35: Explosive Encounter	October 26, 2012	1	2:02	Edmonton, Alberta, Canada	
Win	4-0	Jordan Tracey	Submission (kimura)	Battle for the Border 1	September 8, 2012	1	3:24	Cranbrook, British Columbia, Canada	
Win	3-0	Lee Mein	TKO (punches)	MFC 34: Total Recall	August 10, 2012	1	2:49	Edmonton, Alberta, Canada	
Win	2-0	Craig Hudson	Submission (rear-naked choke)	AFC 10 - Rise	June 15, 2012	1	3:50	Calgary, Alberta, Canada	
Win	1-0	Demetrius Seguin	TKO (punches)	HKFC - School of Hard Knocks 20	February 24, 2012	1	0:13	Medicine Hat, Alberta, Canada	Pro Debut.

== See also ==
- List of current PFL fighters
- List of male mixed martial artists
- Maximum Fighting Championship
