= Daniel Spohn =

American mixed martial arts fighter

- Born: October 12, 1984 (age 42); Abilene, Texas, U.S.
- Other names: Dragon
- Height: 6 ft 4 in (1.93 m)
- Weight: 206 lb (93 kg; 14 st 10 lb)
- Division: Heavyweight; Light Heavyweight
- Reach: 77 in (196 cm)
- Fighting out of: Columbus, Ohio, United States
- Team: Ronin Training Center
- Trainer: Vitor Oliveira
- Years active: 2006–present

Mixed martial arts record
- Total: 29
- Wins: 19
- By knockout: 7
- By submission: 5
- By decision: 7
- Losses: 9
- By knockout: 1
- By submission: 2
- By decision: 6
- Draws: 1

Other information
- Mixed martial arts record from Sherdog

Daniel Spohn (born October 12, 1984) is an American mixed martial artist currently competing in the Light Heavyweight division. A professional competitor since 2006, he has competed for the UFC, Bellator, and was a competitor on The Ultimate Fighter: Team Edgar vs. Team Penn.

== Background ==
Spohn was born in Abilene, Texas on October 12, 1984, to Frank and Joan Spohn. Dan has one brother, Jonathan Spohn, two half brothers, Frank Spohn Jr. and Jason Hammonds, and two half sisters, Kelly and Christie. In 1996 Joan and her three sons, Jason, Dan, and Jonathan moved to Cambridge, Ohio where three years later Dan attended classes at Cambridge Mixed Martial Arts where he studied under Tim McConahay. Spohn attended John Glenn High School in New Concord, Ohio and graduated in 2003. Spohn began training in Kung Fu at the age of 12 and at age 14 began training in Aiki Jitsu. Dan has studied traditional Kachido Aikijitsu for the past 17 years under Sensei Tim McConahay. He holds the rank of 3rd degree black belt in the art, and serves as a part-time co-instructor at Cambridge Martial Arts dojo when he is back in his hometown. Spohn currently trains Brazilian jiu-jitsu under Vitor Oliveira at Ronin training center and holds the rank of Purple belt.

== Mixed martial arts career ==
=== Early career ===
Spohn made his amateur MMA debut in 2006. Over the next three and a half years, he amassed a record of 9–4.

In November 2009, Spohn made his professional MMA debut. He was undefeated for the first two years of his career, with a record of 6 wins. Daniel Spohn holds one of the fastest knockouts in Bellator history with a flying knee 9 second KO. He suffered his first professional defeat against Kelvin Tiller at Bellator 56 via split decision. His next loss in Bellator also came by split decision against Slovak fighter Atilla Vegh.

=== The Ultimate Fighter ===
In March 2014, the UFC officially announced the list of fighters competing on The Ultimate Fighter: Team Edgar vs. Team Penn season with Spohn listed as one entrant.

Spohn made it onto the show by winning his preliminary match against Tyler King via spectacular 10 second knockout. UFC President Dana White called it the "probably the nastiest fucking knockout" of the entire show's history. In the elimination round, Spohn faced Todd Monaghan and won by unanimous decision. In the semifinals, he faced Matt Van Buren and lost via TKO in the second round after an exciting war which won "fight of the season".

=== Ultimate Fighting Championship ===
Despite not making it to the finals, Spohn was one of only two competitors from the series brought back to be featured on the finale. He faced Team Edgar semifinalist Patrick Walsh on July 6, 2014. He lost the bout via unanimous decision and was subsequently released from the promotion.

Spohn is undefeated in 5 of his last 6 fights since being released from UFC and currently holds two regional titles. He is the current Gladiators of the Cage Light Heavyweight champion and also the CFFC Heavyweight Champion. Spohn declared that he is working his way back to the UFC.But, he is also took a career in PFL.

=== Professional Fighters League ===
Spohn faced Marthin Nielsen on April 29, 2021, at PFL 2 as the start of the 2021 PFL Light Heavyweight tournament. He lost the bout via technical submission to an arm-triangle choke in the second round.

Spohn faced Emiliano Sordi at PFL 5 on June 17, 2021. After Sordi was deducted a point in the first round due to strikes to the back of the head, the bout ended in a unanimous draw.

=== Post PFL ===
Spohn was scheduled to face Satoshi Ishii at HEAT 50 on May 7, 2022. However, the bout was scrapped after Spohn tested positive for coronavirus.

Spohn faced Dequan Townsend on October 8, 2022, at Ohio Combat League 22. He won the bout via unanimous decision.

Spohn, replacing a suspended Rob Wilkinson, faced Ty Flores on June 8, 2023, at PFL 4. At weigh-ins, Ty Flores weighed in at 211.2 pounds, 5.2 pounds over the Light Heavyweight limit. He was fined 20% of his purse which went to Spohn and he was given a one-point penalty in the standings. Spohn lost the fight by unanimous decision.

Spohn is set to fight for the Superior Challenge Light Heavyweight title against Bellator veteran Karl Albrektsson on May 25, 2024 at Superior Challenge 27.

== Championships and accomplishments ==
- North American Allied Fight Series
  - NAAFS Light Heavyweight Championship (One time)
- Cage Fury Fighting Championships
  - CFFC Heavyweight Championship (One time)
- AllianceMMA Heavyweight Champion (ITFightSeries) (Current)
- Gladiators of the Cage LHW Champion (Current)

== Mixed martial arts record ==
Professional record breakdown
29 matches	19 wins	9 losses
By knockout	7	1
By submission	5	2
By decision	7	6
Draws	1	

Res.	Record	Opponent	Method	Event	Date	Round	Time	Location	Notes
Loss	19–9–1	Ty Flores	Decision (unanimous)	PFL 4 (2023)	June 8, 2023	3	5:00	Atlanta, Georgia, United States	Catchweight (211.2 lb) bout; Flores missed weight.
Win	19–8–1	Dequan Townsend	Decision (unanimous)	Ohio Combat League 22	October 8, 2022	3	5:00	Columbus, Ohio, United States	
Draw	18–8–1	Emiliano Sordi	Draw (unanimous)	PFL 5 (2021)	June 17, 2021	3	5:00	Atlantic City, New Jersey, United States	Sordi was deducted a point in the first round due to strikes to the back of the head.
Loss	18–8	Marthin Hamlet	Technical Submission (arm-triangle choke)	PFL 2 (2021)	April 29, 2021	2	0:52	Atlantic City, New Jersey, United States	
Loss	18–7	Bazigit Atajev	KO (punches)	PFL 3 (2019)	June 6, 2019	1	3:25	Uniondale, New York, United States	
Loss	18–6	Sean O'Connell	Decision (majority)	PFL 9 (2018)	October 13, 2018	2	5:00	Long Beach, California, United States	2018 PFL Light Heavyweight Quarterfinal bout.
Win	18–5	Artur Alibulatov	Decision (unanimous)	PFL 5 (2018)	August 2, 2018	3	5:00	Uniondale, New York, United States	
Win	17–5	Bazigit Ataev	TKO (punches)	PFL 2 (2018)	June 21, 2018	3	4:31	Chicago, Illinois, United States	
Win	16–5	Angel DeAnda	Submission (arm-triangle choke)	Dana White's Contender Series 2	July 18, 2017	1	3:10	Las Vegas, Nevada, United States	
Win	15–5	Flavio Rogerio Magon	Decision (unanimous)	Hard Knocks 53	January 27, 2017	3	5:00	Calgary, Alberta, Canada	
Win	14–5	Jeff Hughes	TKO (punches)	Alpha One Sports: IT Fight Series 48	December 10, 2016	5	2:02	Columbus, Ohio, United States	Won the Alpha One Sports Heavyweight Championship. Heavyweight bout.
Win	13–5	Rob Morrow	TKO (punches)	GOTC MMA 21	June 4, 2016	3	1:04	Pittsburgh, Pennsylvania, United States	Won the GOTC MMA Light Heavyweight Championship.
Loss	12–5	Rodney Wallace	Decision (unanimous)	Hard Knocks 48	January 29, 2016	5	5:00	Calgary, Alberta, Canada	For the HKFC Light Heavyweight Championship. Return to Light Heavyweight.
Win	12–4	Azunna Anyanwu	TKO (punches)	CFFC 53	December 4, 2015	2	3:24	Philadelphia, Pennsylvania, United States	Heavyweight debut; Won the CFFC Heavyweight Championship.
Win	11–4	Lewis Rumsey	Decision (unanimous)	Gladiators of the Cage 17	June 6, 2015	3	5:00	Butler, Pennsylvania, United States	
Win	10–4	Marcus Finch	TKO (punches)	Absolute Cage Fighting	March 6, 2015	3	3:15	Columbus, Ohio, United States	
Win	9–4	Michael Cockerham	Submission (arm-triangle choke)	Alpha One Sports: IT Fight Series 29	November 22, 2014	1	0:42	Columbus, Ohio, United States	
Loss	8–4	Patrick Walsh	Decision (unanimous)	The Ultimate Fighter: Team Edgar vs. Team Penn Finale	July 6, 2014	3	5:00	Las Vegas, Nevada, United States	
Win	8–3	Aaron Mays	Submission (armbar)	UVC 23: Invasion	May 10, 2013	1	2:41	Columbus, Ohio, United States	
Win	7–3	Robert Morrow	Submission (rear-naked choke)	UVC 22: Mayhem	February 16, 2013	2	4:03	Columbus, Ohio, United States	
Loss	6–3	Josh Stansbury	Submission (guillotine choke)	Bellator 71	June 22, 2012	1	2:30	Chester, West Virginia, United States	
Loss	6–2	Attila Vegh	Decision (split)	Bellator 66	April 20, 2012	3	5:00	Cleveland, Ohio, United States	
Loss	6–1	Kelvin Tiller	Decision (split)	Bellator 56	October 29, 2011	3	5:00	Kansas City, Kansas, United States	
Win	6–0	Dane Bonnigson	KO (knee)	Bellator 51	September 24, 2011	1	0:09	Canton, Ohio, United States	
Win	5–0	John Hawk	Decision (unanimous)	NAAFS: Spohn vs. Hawk 2	May 21, 2011	5	5:00	Streetsboro, Ohio, United States	Won the NAAFS Light Heavyweight Championship.
Win	4–0	Josh Hendricks	TKO (doctor stoppage)	NAAFS: Caged Fury 14	February 26, 2011	1	1:57	Cleveland, Ohio, United States	
Win	3–0	John Hawk	Decision (unanimous)	NAAFS: Rock N Rumble 4	August 28, 2010	3	3:00	Cleveland, Ohio, United States	
Win	2–0	Christopher Thad Schlichter	Decision (unanimous)	NAAFS: Caged Fury 11	April 24, 2009	3	3:00	East Liverpool, Ohio, United States	
Win	1–0	Josh Stansbury	Submission (guillotine choke)	NAAFS: Caged Fury 8	November 25, 2009	2	1:01	East Liverpool, Ohio, United States	

=== Mixed martial arts amateur record ===
Res.	Record	Opponent	Method	Event	Date	Round	Time	Location	Notes
Loss	5–2	Jason Butcher	Submission (rear-naked choke)	NAAFS: Caged Fury 7	October 9, 2009	2	1:38	Cleveland, Ohio, United States	
Win	5–1	Lewis Rumsey	TKO (punches)	NAAFS: Rock N Rumble 3	August 29, 2009	2	1:53	Cleveland, Ohio, United States	
Win	4–1	Joshua Moore	Decision (unanimous)	NAAFS: North Coast Showdown 3	June 12, 2009	3	3:00	Sandusky, Ohio, United States	
Loss	3–1	Chuck Ellison	KO (punch)	NAAFS: North Coast Showdown 1	September 16, 2006	1	0:40	Euclid, Ohio, United States	
Win	3–0	Lou Ludwig	TKO (punches)	NAAFS: Thursday Night Fights	August 3, 2006	1	1:36	Akron, Ohio, United States	
Win	2–0	Dave Osborne	Submission (rear-naked choke)	NAAFS: Fight Night in the Flats 2	June 10, 2006	1	1:00	Cleveland, Ohio, United States	
Win	1–0	Anthony Pray	KO (punches)	NAAFS: Caged Fury 1	May 6, 2006	2	N/A	Dover, Ohio, United States	

== See also ==
- List of current PFL fighters
- List of male mixed martial artists
