= Rashid Magomedov =

Russian mixed martial arts fighter

- Born: Rashid Magomedgadzhievich Magomedov; May 14, 1984 (age 42); Makhachkala, Dagestan ASSR, Russian SFSR, Soviet Union
- Native name: Рашид Магомедов
- Other names: Highlander (Gorets; English: Goretz); Brazilian Killer, Mr. Humble
- Nationality: Russian
- Height: 5 ft 9 in (1.75 m)
- Weight: 155 lb (70 kg; 11.1 st); 173 lb (78 kg; 12.4 st) (walk around weight)
- Division: Lightweight; Welterweight
- Reach: 70 1/2 in (179 cm)
- Style: Boxing
- Fighting out of: Makhachkala, Dagestan, Russia; Coconut Creek, Florida, U.S.
- Team: Gorets MMA; Red Fury Fight Team; Team Takedown; American Top Team
- Trainer: Wrestling: Ramazan Magomedov; Sambo: Shamil Alibatyrov; MMA: Sukhrab Magomedov, Musail Alaudinov
- Rank: Master of Sports in Boxing; Master of Sports in Hand-to-hand combat National Master of Sports in Combat Sambo; National Master of Sports in Army hand-to-hand fight
- Years active: 2008–present

Mixed martial arts record
- Total: 33
- Wins: 26
- By knockout: 9
- By submission: 1
- By decision: 16
- Losses: 6
- By decision: 6
- Draws: 1

Other information
- University: Dagestani State Agricultural Academy
- Mixed martial arts record from Sherdog

Rashid Magomedgadzhievich Magomedov (Russian: Рашид Магомедгаджиевич Магомедов; born May 14, 1984) is a Russian mixed martial artist. He is a former amateur Light heavyweight and Middleweight boxer, and competed at the lightweight mixed martial artist in the Ultimate Fighting Championship. Magomedov is also a former M-1 Global welterweight champion.

== Early life ==
Magomedov was born in Makhachkala, Dagestan. During his childhood Magomedov engaged in various types of martial arts including karate, boxing, and kickboxing winning national competitions in each discipline. Magomedov entered military service and competed in martial arts competitions and in 2004 won the title of Master of Sports in the hand-to-hand fighting category. After Magomedov's period of army service he trained in Combat Sambo.

== Mixed martial arts career ==
=== M-1 Global ===
Magomedov was scheduled to challenge Shamil Zavurov for the M-1 Welterweight championship at M-1 Challenge XXX: Shamil Zavurov vs. Yasubey Enomoto II on December 9, 2011. The fight, however, was postponed.

Magomedov faced Alexander Yakovlev on November 15, 2012, at M-1 Challenge 35. He won the fight via unanimous decision.

=== Ultimate Fighting Championship ===
Magomedov made his UFC debut against fellow promotional newcomer Anthony Rocco Martin in a lightweight bout on February 1, 2014, at UFC 169. After surviving a tight arm bar submission attempt by Martin in the first round, he rallied to win the fight via unanimous decision (29–28, 29–28, 29–28).

In his second fight, Magomedov faced Rodrigo Damm on May 31, 2014, at The Ultimate Fighter Brazil 3 Finale. He won the fight via unanimous decision.

Magomedov faced Elias Silvério on December 20, 2014, at UFC Fight Night 58. After winning the first two rounds, he won the fight via TKO in the third round after dropping Silvério with a stiff left hook and following up with punches, becoming the first man to beat Silvério.

Magomedov faced Gilbert Burns at UFC Fight Night 77 on November 7, 2015. He dominated the three rounds and won via unanimous decision.

Magomedov was expected to face Chris Wade on May 8, 2016, at UFC Fight Night 87. However, Magomedov pulled out of the bout on March 7 due to a knee injury. He was replaced by Rustam Khabilov.

Magomedov faced Beneil Dariush on November 5, 2016, at The Ultimate Fighter Latin America 3 Finale. He lost the fight via unanimous decision.

Magomedov faced Bobby Green on April 15, 2017, at UFC on Fox 24. He won the fight via split decision.

=== Professional Fighters League ===
==== PFL Season 2018 ====
On August 20, 2017, it was reported Magomedov had parted ways with the UFC as the two sides had failed to renegotiate a contract. He signed with the Professional Fighters League (PFL) and took part in the promotion's Lightweight Grand Prix.

In his first fight in the tournament, Magomedov faced Luiz Firmino on August 2, 2018. He won the fight by unanimous decision. Magomedov then fought twice at PFL 9 on October 13, 2018. In the quarterfinals, he fought Will Brooks to a draw but advanced via first round tiebreaker. He then faced Thiago Tavares in the semifinals and won via TKO in the second round. Magomedov then faced Natan Schulte in the finals at PFL 11 on December 31, 2018. He lost the back-and-forth bout by unanimous decision.

==== PFL Season 2019 ====
Magomedov started the regular season against Loik Radzhabov at PFL 2 on May 23, 2019. He won the fight via unanimous decision.

In the second regular season bout he faced Nate Andrews at PFL 5 on July 25, 2019. He lost the fight via unanimous decision but advanced to playoffs.

In the first playoff fight, Magomedov faced Akhmed Aliev at PFL 8 on October 17, 2019. He lost the fight via unanimous decision and was eliminated from the season.

=== Absolute Championship Akhmat ===
After two seasons in the PFL, Magomedov signed a contract with the Absolute Championship Akhmat. He was initially expected to make his debut against Eduard Vartanyan at ACA 108 on August 8, 2020, but was forced to withdraw from the bout due to an injury.

He made his promotional debut against Artiom Damkovsky at ACA 113 on November 6, 2020. He won the fight via unanimous decision.

Rashid faced Mukhamed Kokov on March 26, 2021, at ACA 120: Oliveira vs. Bibulatov. He won a close bout via split decision.

Rashid faced Alexander Sarnavskiy on September 24, 2021, at ACA 129: Sarnavskiy vs. Magomedov. He lost the close bout via split decision.

Rashid faced Ali Bagov in the semi-finals of the Lightweight Grand Prix on July 22, 2022, at ACA 141. The bout ended in a no contest after the president of ACA, Mairbek Khasiev, stopped the bout after the fourth round due to inactivity from both fighters.

== Championships and accomplishments ==
=== Mixed martial arts ===
- Ultimate Fighting Championship
  - UFC.com Awards
    - 2014: Ranked #8 Newcomer of the Year
- M-1 Global
  - M-1 Global Welterweight Championship (One time)
  - Two successful title defenses

=== Sambo ===
- Russian Combat Sambo Federation
  - Dagestan Combat Sambo Championships Runner-up.

=== Hand-to-hand combat ===
- Russian Union of Martial Arts
  - Russian National Champion of Army Hand-to-hand Combat.
- Russian Union of Martial Arts
  - Russian National Hand-to-hand Champion.

=== Kickboxing ===
- Russian Kickboxing Federation (RKF)
  - Russian Nationals 2006 - bronze medalist - 70 kg.

== Mixed martial arts record ==
Professional record breakdown
34 matches	26 wins	6 losses
By knockout	9	0
By submission	1	0
By decision	16	6
Draws	1	
No contests	1	

Res.	Record	Opponent	Method	Event	Date	Round	Time	Location	Notes
Win	26–6–1 (1)	Gian Siqueira	Decision (unanimous)	World X-Impact Federation: APEC 2025 Korea Summit Commemorative World MMA Competition	October 30, 2025	3	4:00	Seoul, South Korea	Catchweight (179 lb) bout.
NC	25–6–1 (1)	Ali Bagov	NC (lack of activity)	ACA 141	July 22, 2022	4	5:00	Sochi, Russia	2022 ACA Lightweight Grand Prix Quarterfinal.
Loss	25–6–1	Alexander Sarnavskiy	Decision (split)	ACA 129	September 24, 2021	5	5:00	Moscow, Russia	
Win	25–5–1	Mukhamed Kokov	Decision (split)	ACA 120	March 26, 2021	3	5:00	Saint Petersburg, Russia	
Win	24–5–1	Artiom Damkovsky	Decision (unanimous)	ACA 113	November 6, 2020	3	5:00	Moscow, Russia	
Loss	23–5–1	Akhmet Aliev	Decision (unanimous)	PFL 8 (2019)	October 17, 2019	2	5:00	Las Vegas, Nevada, United States	2019 PFL Lightweight Tournament Quarterfinal.
Loss	23–4–1	Nate Andrews	Decision (unanimous)	PFL 5 (2019)	July 25, 2019	3	5:00	Atlantic City, New Jersey, United States	
Win	23–3–1	Loik Radzhabov	Decision (unanimous)	PFL 2 (2019)	May 23, 2019	3	5:00	Uniondale, New York, United States	
Loss	22–3–1	Natan Schulte	Decision (unanimous)	PFL 11 (2018)	December 31, 2018	5	5:00	New York City, New York, United States	2018 PFL Lightweight Tournament Final.
Win	22–2–1	Thiago Tavares	TKO (punches)	PFL 9 (2018)	October 13, 2018	2	3:36	Long Beach, California, United States	2018 PFL Lightweight Tournament Semifinal.
Draw	21–2–1	Will Brooks	Draw (unanimous)	PFL 9 (2018)	October 13, 2018	2	5:00	Long Beach, California, United States	2018 PFL Lightweight Tournament Quarterfinal. Advanced via first round tiebreaker.
Win	21–2	Luiz Firmino	Decision (unanimous)	PFL 5 (2018)	August 2, 2018	3	5:00	Uniondale, New York, United States	
Win	20–2	Bobby Green	Decision (split)	UFC on Fox: Johnson vs. Reis	April 15, 2017	3	5:00	Kansas City, Missouri, United States	
Loss	19–2	Beneil Dariush	Decision (unanimous)	The Ultimate Fighter Latin America 3 Finale: dos Anjos vs. Ferguson	November 5, 2016	3	5:00	Mexico City, Mexico	
Win	19–1	Gilbert Burns	Decision (unanimous)	UFC Fight Night: Belfort vs. Henderson 3	November 7, 2015	3	5:00	São Paulo, Brazil	
Win	18–1	Elias Silvério	TKO (punches)	UFC Fight Night: Machida vs. Dollaway	December 20, 2014	3	4:57	Barueri, Brazil	
Win	17–1	Rodrigo Damm	Decision (unanimous)	The Ultimate Fighter Brazil 3 Finale: Miocic vs. Maldonado	May 31, 2014	3	5:00	São Paulo, Brazil	
Win	16–1	Anthony Rocco Martin	Decision (unanimous)	UFC 169	February 1, 2014	3	5:00	Newark, New Jersey, United States	Lightweight debut.
Win	15–1	Alexander Yakovlev	Decision (unanimous)	M-1 Challenge 35	November 15, 2012	5	5:00	Saint Petersburg, Russia	Defended the M-1 Global Welterweight Championship.
Win	14–1	Yasubey Enomoto	Decision (unanimous)	M-1 Challenge 31	March 16, 2012	5	5:00	Saint Petersburg, Russia	Won the M-1 Global Welterweight Championship.
Win	13–1	Aurel Pirtea	Decision (unanimous)	World Mixed Martial Arts Federation: WMAC 2011 Finals	October 9, 2011	2	5:00	Yalta, Russia	
Win	12–1	Mikel Cortes	TKO (doctor stoppage)	World Mixed Martial Arts Federation: WMAC 2011 Semifinals	October 8, 2011	2	5:00	Yalta, Russia	
Win	11–1	Uriy Nazarec	Submission (rear-naked choke)	World Mixed Martial Arts Federation: WMAC 2011 Quarterfinals	October 7, 2011	1	N/A	Yalta, Russia	Return to Welterweight.
Win	10–1	Rafal Moks	TKO (punches)	M-1 Challenge 23	March 5, 2011	1	2:05	Saint Petersburg, Russia	
Win	9–1	Igor Araújo	Decision (unanimous)	M-1 Challenge 21	October 28, 2010	3	5:00	Saint Petersburg, Russia	Middleweight debut.
Win	8–1	Dan Hope	KO (punch)	League S-70: Plotforma Cup 2010	July 10, 2010	1	0:57	Sochi, Russia	
Loss	7–1	Magomedrasul Khasbulaev	Decision (split)	M-1 Selection 2010: Eastern Europe Round 2	April 10, 2010	3	5:00	Kyiv, Ukraine	
Win	7–0	Alexei Nazarov	Decision (unanimous)	M-1 Challenge 20: 2009 Finals	December 3, 2009	3	5:00	Saint Petersburg, Russia	
Win	6–0	Shamil Zavurov	Decision (split)	M-1 Challenge: 2009 Selections 9	November 11, 2009	3	5:00	Saint Petersburg, Russia	
Win	5–0	Magomedrasul Khasbulaev	Decision (unanimous)	M-1 Challenge: 2009 Selections 5	July 2, 2009	3	5:00	Saint Petersburg, Russia	Welterweight debut.
Win	4–0	Yusup Islamov	TKO (punches)	Volgograd Fight: Battle on Volga 2009	May 7, 2009	1	1:22	Volgograd, Russia	
Win	3–0	Bagavdin Gadzhimuradov	TKO (punches)	M-1 Challenge: 2009 Selections 1	March 13, 2009	2	1:37	Saint Petersburg, Russia	
Win	2–0	Valeriv Chernousov	KO (punch)	Universal Fighter: Gladiators 3	November 1, 2008	2	1:58	Ufa, Russia	
Win	1–0	Vladimir Vladimirov	TKO (punches)	Universal Fighter: Mixed Fights 2	June 12, 2008	1	3:40	Ufa, Russia	Lightweight debut.

== See also ==
- List of current mixed martial arts champions
- List of male mixed martial artists
