= Ronny Markes =

Brazilian mixed martial arts fighter

- Born: Ronny Markes; April 21, 1988 (age 38); Natal, Rio Grande do Norte, Brazil
- Height: 6 ft 1 in (185 cm)
- Weight: 245 lb (111 kg; 17 st 7 lb)
- Division: Super Heavyweight; Heavyweight; Light Heavyweight; Middleweight
- Reach: 75 in (191 cm)
- Stance: Orthodox
- Fighting out of: Rio de Janeiro, Brazil
- Team: Nova União/Kimura (2003–present); Gracie Barra Portland
- Rank: Black Belt in Brazilian Jiu-Jitsu under Andre Pederneiras
- Years active: 2007–present

Mixed martial arts record
- Total: 37
- Wins: 25
- By knockout: 11
- By submission: 7
- By decision: 7
- Losses: 12
- By knockout: 7
- By submission: 3
- By decision: 2

Other information
- Mixed martial arts record from Sherdog

Ronny Markes (born April 21, 1988) is a Brazilian mixed martial artist currently competing in the Heavyweight division. A professional competitor since 2007, Markes has formerly competed for the UFC, King of the Cage, PFL, Bellator MMA, and M-1 Global. He is the current King of the Cage Super Heavyweight Champion.

== MMA career ==
=== Early career ===
Markes made his professional MMA debut in 2007 at an event in Spain. Markes competed mostly in his native Brazil, with a few early professional fights taking place in Europe. He amassed an impressive 11-1 prior to signing with Zuffa in 2011.

=== Ultimate Fighting Championship ===
Markes signed with the UFC as an injury replacement for Stephan Bonnar against Karlos Vemola at UFC on Versus 5 on August 14, 2011. He won the fight via unanimous decision.

Markes dropped down to the Middleweight division and faced Aaron Simpson on February 15, 2012 at UFC on Fuel TV 1 After being dropped by an uppercut late in the first round Markes overcame adversity and defeated Simpson via split decision.

In his third fight for the promotion, Markes faced Andrew Craig on January 19, 2013 at UFC on FX 7. He won the fight via unanimous decision.

Markes was expected to face Derek Brunson on June 8, 2013 at UFC on Fuel TV 10. However, the bout was scrapped on the day of the weigh in as Markes was involved in a minor traffic accident. While Markes was not seriously injured, the incident prevented him from competing.

For his fourth fight with the promotion, Markes faced Yoel Romero on November 6, 2013 at UFC Fight Night 31. He lost the fight via knockout in the third round.

Markes faced Thiago Santos on March 23, 2014 at UFC Fight Night 38. Markes was unable to make weight for this fight. He lost the fight via TKO in the first round, and was subsequently released from the promotion shortly after.

=== World Series of Fighting ===
On May 15, 2014 it was announced that Markes had signed a deal with World Series of Fighting and plans to return to the Light Heavyweight division.

Markes was expected to face Kelvin Tiller at World Series of Fighting 12: Palomino vs Gonzalez on August 9, 2014, However Tiller was pulled from the fight to replace injured Krasimir Mladenov Markes instead fought promotional newcomer Cully Butterfield at the event. He won the fight by unanimous decision.

Markes was expected to face Thiago Silva at WSOF 19 on March 28, 2015. However Silva was pulled from the fight to face Matt Hamill at WSOF 19. Matt Hamill was later replaced by Teddy Holder. Markes was then scheduled to face David Branch at WSOF 20 on April 10, 2015 However, on the day of the weigh-in, Markes was forced out of the bout due to dehydration and was replaced by promotional newcomer Jesse McElligott.

=== Bellator MMA ===
Markes was expected to make his Bellator MMA promotional debut against Josh Barnett on December 20, 2019 at Bellator's Salute the Troops event in Honolulu, Hawaii. However, Barnett was deemed unable to compete due to severe illness on the night of the event and the bout was cancelled. The fight was rescheduled for Bellator 241 on March 13, 2020. However, Barnett failed his medical tests and was replaced by Matt Mitrione. However, the whole event was eventually cancelled due to the prevailing COVID-19 pandemic.

Markes made his promotional debut against Linton Vassell at Bellator 254 on December 10, 2020. He lost the fight via TKO in the second round.

Markes faced Said Sowma on July 16, 2021 at Bellator 262. He lost via knockout in the first round.

On July 19, 2021, Bellator MMA officials revealed that Markes was released from the promotion.

=== Post Bellator ===
Markes faced Victor Jones on November 19, 2021 at Premier FC 32 He won by TKO 21 seconds in to the first round.

Markes faced Rodrigo Duarte on December 18, 2021 at Shooto Brasil 110. He won the bout via kimura in the first round.

Markes was scheduled to face Reggie Peña at Eagle FC 46 on March 11, 2022. The day of the event, the bout was delayed and will likely happen at a future event. The bout eventually took place on May 20, 2022 at Eagle FC 47. Markes won the fight via stoppage after Pena injured his knee in the second round.

Markes faced Szymon Bajor on August 13, 2022 at PFL 8. Markes lost the bout via unanimous decision.

Markes was scheduled to face Da Woon Jung on May 25, 2025 at GFL 2. However, the first two GFL events were postponed indefinitely.

== Grappling career ==
Markes faced Viktor Nemkov at ADXC 10 on May 31, 2025. He won the match by decision.

== Championships and accomplishments ==
- King of the Cage
  - KOTC Super Heavyweight Championship (One time)

== Mixed martial arts record ==
Professional record breakdown
37 matches	25 wins	12 losses
By knockout	11	7
By submission	7	3
By decision	7	2

Res.	Record	Opponent	Method	Event	Date	Round	Time	Location	Notes
Loss	25–12	Jordan Heiderman	TKO (elbows)	Gamebred Bareknuckle MMA 10	May 1, 2026	2	1:03	Miami, Florida, United States	Bare Knuckle MMA. 2026 Gamebred FC Heavyweight Tournament Round of 16.
Loss	25–11	Kazbek Saidaliev	KO (knee)	UAE Warriors 61	July 23, 2025	2	0:22	Abu Dhabi, United Arab Emirates	
Win	25–10	Lawrence Phillips	TKO (punches)	XFC 51	September 27, 2024	1	1:29	Milwaukee, Wisconsin, United States	
Win	24–10	D.J. Linderman	TKO (punches)	Pure Combat: Battleground	July 27, 2024	2	4:02	Oroville, California, United States	Won the PC Heavyweight Championship.
Win	23–10	Lucas Chiumiento	Submission (kimura)	Fera Championship: Fight Night	October 7, 2023	1	2:21	Zahra, Kuwait	
Loss	22–10	Szymon Bajor	Decision (unanimous)	PFL 8 (2022)	August 13, 2022	3	5:00	Cardiff, Wales	
Win	22–9	Reggie Peña	TKO (knee injury)	Eagle FC 47	May 20, 2022	2	1:21	Miami, Florida, United States	Light Heavyweight bout.
Win	21–9	Rodrigo Duarte	Submission (kimura)	Shooto Brasil 110	December 18, 2021	1	3:23	Rio de Janeiro, Brazil	Catchweight (220 lb) bout.
Win	20–9	Victor Jones	TKO (punches)	Premier FC 32	November 19, 2021	1	0:21	Springfield, Massachusetts, United States	
Loss	19–9	Said Sowma	KO (punches)	Bellator 262	July 16, 2021	1	1:09	Uncasville, Connecticut, United States	
Loss	19–8	Linton Vassell	TKO (punches)	Bellator 254	December 10, 2020	2	3:37	Uncasville, Connecticut, United States	Heavyweight debut.
Win	19–7	Sigi Pesaleli	TKO (punches)	PFL 3 (2019)	June 6, 2019	2	3:44	Uniondale, New York, United States	Catchweight (211.8 lb) bout; Markes missed weight.
Loss	18–7	Brandon Halsey	Decision (unanimous)	PFL 9 (2018)	October 13, 2018	2	5:00	Long Beach, California, United States	2018 PFL Light Heavyweight Tournament Alternate bout.
Loss	18–6	Sean O'Connell	TKO (punches)	PFL 2 (2018)	June 21, 2018	2	0:41	Chicago, Illinois, United States	
Win	18–5	Dylan Potter	Submission (arm-triangle choke)	KOTC: Fractured	August 5, 2017	1	2:29	Lincoln City, Oregon, United States	
Win	17–5	Smealinho Rama	Decision (unanimous)	PFL Daytona	June 30, 2017	3	5:00	Daytona Beach, Florida, United States	
Loss	16–5	Viktor Nemkov	Submission (guillotine choke)	M-1 Challenge 77	May 19, 2017	1	2:06	Sochi, Russia	Return to Light Heavyweight.
Win	16–4	Tony Lopez	Submission (arm-triangle choke)	KOTC: Heavy Trauma	February 4, 2017	1	3:03	Lincoln City, Oregon, United States	Super Heavyweight debut. Won the KOTC Super Heavyweight Championship.
Loss	15–4	Cassio Barbosa de Oliveira	Submission (heel hook)	Shooto Brasil 61	February 13, 2016	1	1:47	Rio de Janeiro, Brazil	
Win	15–3	Cully Butterfield	Decision (unanimous)	WSOF 12	August 9, 2014	3	5:00	Las Vegas, Nevada, United States	Return to Light Heavyweight.
Loss	14–3	Thiago Santos	TKO (body kick and punches)	UFC Fight Night: Shogun vs. Henderson 2	March 23, 2014	1	0:53	Natal, Brazil	Catchweight (190 lb) bout; Markes missed weight.
Loss	14–2	Yoel Romero	KO (punches)	UFC: Fight for the Troops 3	November 6, 2013	3	1:39	Fort Campbell, Kentucky, United States	
Win	14–1	Andrew Craig	Decision (unanimous)	UFC on FX: Belfort vs. Bisping	January 19, 2013	3	5:00	São Paulo, Brazil	
Win	13–1	Aaron Simpson	Decision (split)	UFC on Fuel TV: Sanchez vs. Ellenberger	February 15, 2012	3	5:00	Omaha, Nebraska, United States	Middleweight debut.
Win	12–1	Karlos Vémola	Decision (unanimous)	UFC Live: Hardy vs. Lytle	August 14, 2011	3	5:00	Milwaukee, Wisconsin, United States	
Win	11–1	Paulo Filho	Decision (unanimous)	International Fighter Championship	April 29, 2011	3	5:00	Recife, Brazil	
Win	10–1	Diogo Osama	TKO (punches)	Shooto Brazil 22	April 1, 2011	1	0:45	Brasília, Brazil	
Win	9–1	Wendres Carlos da Silva	TKO (submission to punches)	Gouveia Fight Championship 2	January 21, 2011	3	4:57	Natal, Brazil	
Win	8–1	Fernando Silva	TKO (punches)	Brazil Fight 3: Minas Gerais vs. São Paulo	November 27, 2010	1	3:08	Belo Horizonte, Brazil	
Loss	7–1	Paulo Rodrigues	Submission (armbar)	Iron Man Championship 7	October 7, 2010	1	4:43	Belém, Brazil	
Win	7–0	Fernando Almeida	TKO (punches)	Amazon Show Combat	September 9, 2010	1	N/A	Manaus, Brazil	
Win	6–0	Wanderlan Vila Cruzeiro	TKO (punches)	Shooto: Brazil 16	June 12, 2010	1	N/A	Rio de Janeiro, Brazil	
Win	5–0	Roque Oliver	Submission (arm-triangle choke)	Platinum Fight Brazil 2	December 5, 2009	1	2:42	Rio de Janeiro, Brazil	
Win	4–0	Charles Andrade	Submission (kimura)	Natal Fight Championship 2	November 12, 2009	1	3:56	Natal, Brazil	
Win	3–0	Michael Knaap	Decision (unanimous)	BG: Top Team	October 25, 2009	3	5:00	Beverwijk, Netherlands	
Win	2–0	Junior Fofinho	Submission (arm-triangle choke)	Platinum Fight Brazil	August 13, 2009	1	0:28	Natal, Brazil	
Win	1–0	Enrico Vaccaro	TKO (punches)	KO: Arena 6	January 27, 2007	2	1:05	Spain	

== See also ==
- List of male mixed martial artists
