= PFL Champions Series 3 =

Professional Fighters League MMA event in 2025

PFL Champions Series 3: Nurmagomedov vs. Hughes 2
- The poster for PFL Champions Series 3: Nurmagomedov vs. Hughes 2
- Promotion: Professional Fighters League
- Date: October 3, 2025
- Venue: Coca-Cola Arena
- City: Dubai, United Arab Emirates

Event chronology
PFL MENA 3	PFL Champions Series 3: Nurmagomedov vs. Hughes 2	PFL Africa 3

PFL Champions Series Dubai: Nurmagomedov vs. Hughes 2 was a mixed martial arts event produced by the Professional Fighters League that took place on October 3, 2025, at Coca-Cola Arena in Dubai, United Arab Emirates.

== Background ==
The event marked the promotion's second visit to Dubai and first since PFL Champions Series 1 in January 2025.

A PFL Lightweight Championship rematch between a current Bellator Lightweight Champion Usman Nurmagomedov and former Cage Warriors Featherweight Champion Paul Hughes headlined the event. The pairing previously met at PFL Champions Series 1 in January 2025, which Nurmagomedov defended the title by majority decision.

The co-main event took place a PFL Light Heavyweight Championship bout between a current Bellator Light Heavyweight Champion (also The Ultimate Fighter: Team Edgar vs. Team Penn light heavyweight winner) Corey Anderson and 2024 PFL Light Heavyweight Tournament winner Dovletdzhan Yagshimuradov. The pairing previously met in the Bellator Light Heavyweight Grand Prix at Bellator 257 in April 2021, which Anderson advanced to semifinal by technical knockout in round three.

Artem Lobov and Zubaira Tukhugov were scheduled to meet at this event. The pairing was initially scheduled for UFC Fight Night: Volkan vs. Smith in October 2018, but Tukhugov was removed from the bout due his role in the UFC 229 post-fight melee. However on September 30, the promotion announced that the bout was scrapped due to Lobov's suffered an injury in training.

== Results ==
Main card (ESPN App)
Weight class				Method	Round	Time	Notes
Lightweight	Usman Nurmagomedov	def.	Paul Hughes	Decision (unanimous) (50–45, 49–46, 48–47)	5	5:00	(Note: For the inaugural PFL Lightweight Championship.)
Light Heavyweight	Corey Anderson	def.	Dovletdzhan Yagshimuradov	Decision (unanimous) (49–45, 49–45, 48–47)	5	5:00	(Note: For the inaugural PFL Light Heavyweight Championship.)
Bantamweight	Sergio Pettis	def.	Magomed Magomedov	KO (spinning back elbow and punch)	2	4:31
Lightweight	Archie Colgan	def.	Jay-Jay Wilson	Decision (unanimous) (30–27, 30–27, 29–28)	3	5:00
Catchweight (140 lb)	Jack Cartwright	def.	Caolán Loughran	Decision (unanimous) (29–28, 29–28, 29–28)	3	5:00
Preliminary card (ESPN App)
Heavyweight	Pouya Rahmani	def.	Slim Trabelsi	TKO (punches)	1	2:47
Welterweight	Florim Zendeli	def.	Omar El Dafrawy	Decision (unanimous) (29–28, 29–28, 29–28)	3	5:00
Lightweight	Mirafzal Akhtamov	def.	Luann Sardinha	Decision (split) (29–28, 28–29, 29–28)	3	5:00
Lightweight	Takeshi Izumi	def.	Vinicius Sacchelli Cenci	Decision (unanimous) (30–27, 29–28, 29–28)	3	5:00
Lightweight	Makkasharip Zaynukov	def.	John Mitchell	Decision (unanimous) (30–26, 29–28, 29–28)	3	5:00
Middleweight	Jarrah Al-Silawi	def.	Gregory Babene	Decision (split) (28–29, 29–28, 30–27)	3	5:00

== See also ==
- 2025 in Professional Fighters League
- List of PFL events
- List of current PFL fighters
