= Gakko, Tsumadinsky District, Republic of Dagestan =

Gakko Гакко
- Selo
- Location within Republic of Dagestan Location within Russia
- Coordinates: 42°28′N 45°52′E
- Country: Russia
- Region: Republic of Dagestan
- District: Tsumadinsky District
- Time zone: UTC+3:00

Gakko (Russian: Гакко) is a rural locality (a selo) in Tsumadinsky District, Republic of Dagestan, Russia. Population: 378 (2021 census); 331 (2002 census); 282 (1989 Soviet census). There are 3 streets in this selo.

== Geography ==
Selo is located 21 km from Agvali (the district's administrative centre), 144 km from Makhachkala (capital of Dagestan) and 1,625 km from Moscow. Sildi is the nearest rural locality.
