= List of undefeated mixed martial artists =

The following is a list of undefeated mixed martial artists with at least one fight in prominent leagues (UFC, PRIDE, BELLATOR, PFL, ONE, RIZIN, ACA, KSW, OKTAGON, DWCS). Excludes mixed martial artists with fewer than ten wins.

== List ==
Fighter	N	Gender	Weight class	Organization	Record	Notes
Khabib Nurmagomedov	(Russia)	Male	Lightweight; Catchweight; Welterweight	Retired	29–0 (8 KO, 11 SUB)	
Movlid Khaybulaev	(Russia)	Male	Featherweight; Catchweight; Lightweight	PFL	23–0–1(2 NC, 6 KO, 3 SUB)	1st NC : Originally a TKO (punches) win for Daniel Pineda; overturned after he tested positive for a banned substance. 2nd NC : Originally a submission win for Movlid overturned after he tested positive for a banned substance.
Usman Nurmagomedov	(Russia)	Male	Lightweight; Featherweight	PFL	22–0 (1 NC, 9 KO, 7 SUB)	Originally a unanimous decision win for Nurmagomedov, overturned after he tested positive for a banned substance.
Razhabali Shaydullaev	(Kyrgyzstan)	Male	Bantamweight; Featherweight	PFL	20–0 (7 KO, 12 SUB)	
Timur Khizriev	(Russia)	Male	Featherweight; Catchweight; Lightweight	PFL	19–0 (3 KO, 1 SUB)	
Michael Morales	(Ecuador)	Male	Welterweight; Lightweight	UFC	19–0 (14 KO, 1 SUB)	
Shavkat Rakhmonov	(Kazakhstan)	Male	Welterweight; Catchweight	UFC	19–0 (8 KO, 10 SUB)	
Seika Izawa	(Japan)	Female	Atomweight; Strawweight	Rizin FF	18–0 (1 KO, 10 SUB)	
Muslim Magomedov	(Russia)	Male	Light Heavyweight; Middleweight; Heavyweight	ACA	17–0 (7 KO, 2 SUB)	
Muhammad Mokaev	(Russia)	Male	Flyweight; Bantamweight; Strawweight	WOW FC	17–0 (1 NC, 3 KO, 7 SUB)	Bout declared a no contest after an accidental groin kick rendered Ibragim Navruzov unable to continue.
Islam Omarov	(Russia)	Male	Featherweight; Lightweight; Catchweight; Bantamweight	ACA	17–0 (4 KO, 8 SUB)	
Magomed Magomedov	(Russia)	Male	Welterweight	ONE Championship	16–0 (5 KO, 4 SUB)	
Dakota Ditcheva	(England)	Female	Flyweight	PFL	16–0 (11 KO, 1 SUB)	
Farid Basharat	(Afghanistan)	Male	Bantamweight; Catchweight; Featherweight		16–0 (1 KO, 6 SUB)	
Jakub Kaszuba	(Poland)	Male	Lightweight; Catchweight; Welterweight	PFL	16–0 (6 KO, 2 SUB)	
Fransino Tirta	(Indonesia)	Male	Bantamweight	Retired	16–0–1 (7 KO, 5 SUB)	
Phillip Miller	(United States)	Male	Middleweight; Light Heavyweight	Retired	16–0 (10 KO, 2 SUB)	
Jacobe Smith	(United States)	Male	Welterweight	UFC	14–0 (10 KO, 1 SUB)	
Shamil Erdogan	(Russia)	Male	Light Heavyweight	ONE Championship	14–0 (8 KO, 2 SUB)	
Akbar Abdullaev	(Kyrgyzstan)	Male	Lightweight; Featherweight	UFC	14–0 (13 KO, 1 SUB)	
Luke Riley	(England)	Male	Featherweight	UFC	14–0 (9 KO)	
Ramazan Kuramagomedov	(Russia)	Male	Welterweight	Retired	14–0 (2 KO, 6 SUB)	
Aliaskhab Khizriev	(Russia)	Male	Middleweight; Welterweight; Lightweight	Retired	14–0 (1 NC, 5 KO, 5 SUB)	Bout declared a no contest after an accidental eye poke rendered Makhmud Muradov unable to continue.
Khabib Nabiev	(Russia)	Male	Light Heavyweight	PFL	13–0 (6 KO, 5 SUB)	
Lucia Szabová	(Slovakia)	Female	Flyweight; Bantamweight	UFC	13–0 (5 KO, 5 SUB)	
Piero Guaylupo	(Peru)	Male	Lightweight	UFC	13–0 (11 KO, 0 SUB)	
Thomas Gantt	(United States)	Male	Lightweight	UFC	13–0 (1 NC, 5 KO, 5 SUB)	
Mario Pinto	(Portugal)	Male	Heavyweight	UFC	13–0 (7 KO, 1 SUB)	
Khalim Nazrulloev	(Tajikistan)	Male	Bantamweight	RCC	13–0 (6 KO, 2 SUB)	
Vladyslav Rudnev	(Ukraine)	Male	Welterweight	UAE Warriors	13–0 (1 KO, 3 SUB)	
Yryskeldi Duysheev	(Kyrgyzstan)	Male	Bantamweight	ROAD FC	13–0 (3 KO, 8 SUB)	
Navajo Stirling	(New Zealand)	Male	Light Heavyweight	UFC	12–0 (8 KO)	
Murtazali Magomedov	(Kyrgyzstan)	Male	Featherweight	UFC	12–0 (5 KO, 5 SUB)	
Alikhan Masaev	(Russia)	Male	Lightweight	ACA	12–0 (5 KO, 2 SUB)	
Tommy McMillen	(United States)	Male	Featherweight	UFC	12-0 (4 KO, 5 SUB)	
Ruslan Amuev	(Kyrgyzstan)	Male	Bantamweight	Black Combat	12–0 (1 KO, 4 SUB)	
Artem Bachun	(Belarus)	Male	Featherweight	FIGHT NIGHTS	12–0 (1 KO, 5 SUB)	
Samandar Murodov	(Tajikistan)	Male	Welterweight	UAE Warriors	12–0 (2 KO, 5 SUB)	
Thad Jean	(Haiti)	Male	Welterweight	PFL	12–0 (5 KO, 1 SUB)	
Adam Masaev	(Russia)	Male	Welterweight	KSW	12–0 (2 KO, 8 SUB)	
Baysangur Susurkaev	(Russia)	Male	Middleweight	UFC	12–0 (9 KO, 1 SUB)	
Renat Khavalov	(Russia)	Male	Bantamweight	PFL	12–0 (7 KO)	
Daniyar Toychubek Uulu	(Kyrgyzstan)	Male	Flyweight; Bantamweight	Black Combat	12–0 (5 KO, 1 SUB)	
Miljan Zdravković	(Serbia)	Male	Bantamweight	FNC	11–0 (5 KO, 1 SUB)	
Abdul-Rakhman Yakhyaev	(Russia)	Male	Light Heavyweight	UFC	11–0 (5 KO, 5 SUB)	
Ibragim Ibragimov	(Russia)	Male	Featherweight	PFL	11–0 (3 KO, 4 SUB)	
George Staines	(England)	Male	Lightweight	UFC	11–0 (1 KO, 3 SUB)	
Kanata Nagai	(Japan)	Male	Featherweight	ONE Championship	11–0-1 (3 KO, 2 SUB)	
Lazaro Dayron	(Cuba)	Male	Bantamweight	PFL	11–0-1 (3 KO, 2 SUB)	
Amru Magomedov	(Russia)	Male	Lightweight	PFL	11–0 (3 KO, 5 SUB)	
Elbek Alyshov	(Azerbaijan)	Male	Bantamweight	ONE Championship	11–0 (2 KO, 8 SUB)	
Eduard Bagratunyan	(Armenia)	Male	Lightweight	FIGHT NIGHTS	11–0 (7 KO, 1 SUB)	
Mitchell McKee	(United States)	Male	Bantamweight	PFL	11–0 (6 KO)	
Mansher Khera	(United States)	Male	Lightweight	FURY	11–0 (3 KO, 6 SUB)	
Felix Klinkhammer	(England)	Male	Welterweight	Oktagon MMA	11–0 (1 KO, 7 SUB)	
Louis Lee Scott	(England)	Male	Bantamweight	UFC	11–0 (6 KO, 2 SUB)	
Ramiro Jiménez	(Mexico)	Male	Featherweight	UFC	11–0 (6 KO, 3 SUB)	
Mauricio Partida	(Venezuela)	Male	Flyweight	PFL	11–0 (6 KO, 1 SUB)	
Rafael Lovato Jr.	(United States)	Male	Catchweight; Middleweight	Retired	11–0 (2 KO, 7 SUB)	
Dmitry Sosnovskiy	(Russia)	Male	Heavyweight	Retired	11–0 (6 KO, 3 SUB)	
Rickson Gracie	(Brazil)	Male	Middleweight	Retired	11–0 (2 KO, 9 SUB)	
Patrick Habirora	(Belgium)	Male	Welterweight	PFL	10–0 (8 KO, 1 SUB)	
Ilmadi Israilov	(Russia)	Male	Bantamweight	ONE Championship	10–0 (6 SUB)	
Raul Lemberanskij	(Azerbaijan)	Male	Bantamweight	Oktagon MMA	10–0 (2 KO, 1 SUB)	
Josh O'Connor	(Wales)	Male	Featherweight	ARES	10–0-1 (5 KO, 3 SUB)	
Alvi Dasuyev	(Russia)	Male	Welterweight	UFC	10–0 (6 KO, 3 SUB)	
Chermen Gobaev	(Russia)	Male	Bantamweight	ACA	10–0 (2 KO)	
Christian Natividad	(United States)	Male	Flyweight	UFC	10–0 (4 KO)	
Michael Oliveira	(Brazil)	Male	Welterweight	UFC	10-0 (9 KO)	
Muhammad Saidov	(Russia)	Male	Light Heavyweight	UFC	10–0 (7 KO, 2 SUB)	
Rasul Magomedov	(Russia)	Male	Light Heavyweight	PFL	10–0 (4 KO, 2 SUB)	
Zumso Zuraev	(Russia)	Male	Heavyweight	ACA	10–0 (4 KO, 5 SUB)	
Julieta Martinez	(Argentina)	Female	Strawweight	LUX	10–0 (5 KO, 2 SUB)	
Roman Lukashevich	(Belarus)	Male	Heavyweight	UAE Warriors	10–0 (3 KO, 7 SUB)	
Nursultan Rakhmanberdi	(Kyrgyzstan)	Male	Featherweight; Bantamweight	Retired	10–0 (5 KO)	

== See also ==
- List of female mixed martial artists
- List of male mixed martial artists
- List of mixed martial artists with the most sanctioned fights
