= List of mixed martial artists with the most sanctioned fights =

The following list features mixed martial artists who have competed in the most bouts that were approved and regulated by a formal sanctioning body. This includes mixed martial arts and shoot fighting, but excludes bouts in specific forms, such as boxing, grappling, or wrestling. It also excludes any unregulated bouts.

Records in the table below are as recorded by Sherdog and are current as of 19 July 2026. Fight totals for these competitors differ between statistical databases, since regional bouts are not recorded consistently across sources.

== List of fighters ==
Name	Fights	Wins	Losses	Draws	No Contest	Notes
Travis Fulton	320	255	54	10	1	Record holder for most wins Fought 6 former and future UFC Champions and 5 UFC title contenders.
Shannon Ritch	150	58	88	0	4	First match 1998
Jay Ellis	129	17	112	0	0	
Dan Severn	127	101	19	7	0	
Jeremy Horn	120	92	22	5	1	
Yuki Kondo	117	67	41	9	0	70 matches in shoot fighting
Ikuhisa Minowa	116	63	45	8	0	1–8–1 in first ten matches
Shaun Lomas	114	27	86	1	0	
Bryan Robinson	110	45	65	0	0	
Dennis Reed	109	45	63	1	0	
Travis Wiuff	101	78	22	0	1	
Tony Lopez	101	65	35	0	1	
Paul Jenkins	98	41	47	8	2	
Arymarcel Santos	95	50	45	0	0	
Johnathan Ivey	92	33	58	0	1	Has fought 28 UFC veterans
Shonie Carter	91	52	32	7	0	
Adrian Serrano	89	56	29	4	0	
Jeff Monson	88	60	26	1	1	
Alexander Shlemenko	87	68	17	1	1	
Ivica Truscek	86	46	40	0	0	

== See also ==
- List of undefeated mixed martial artists
