= Usman Nurmagomedov =

Russian mixed martial arts fighter (b.1998)

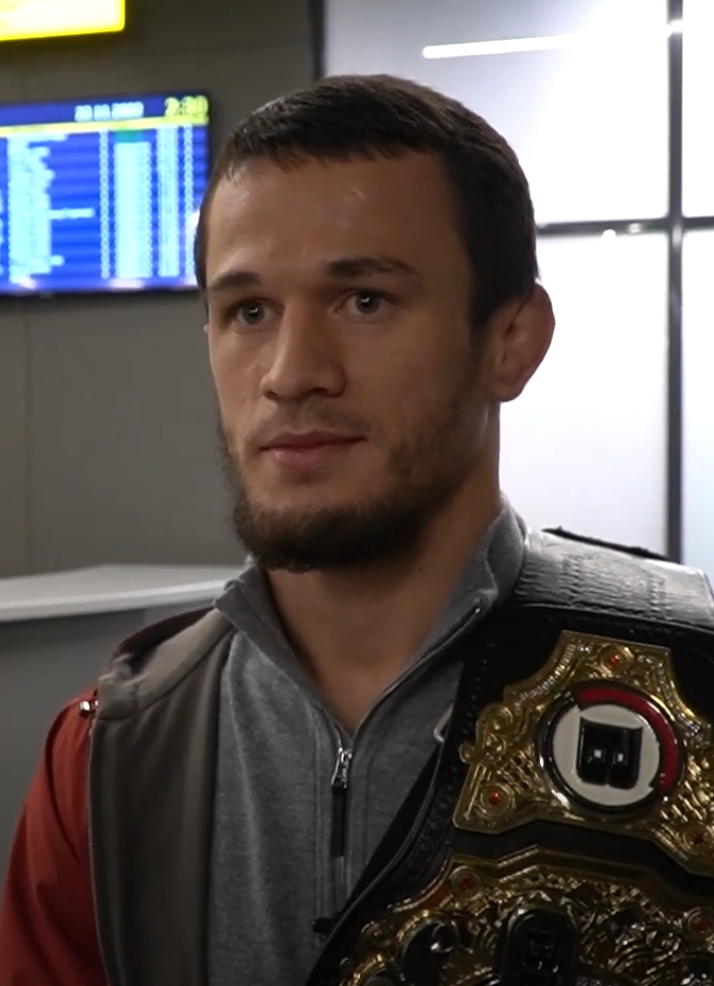
- Nurmagomedov in 2022
- Born: Usman Magomednabiyevich Nurmagomedov; 17 April 1998 (age 28); Kizilyurt, Dagestan, Russia
- Native name: Усман Нурмагомедов
- Height: 5 ft 11 in (1.80 m)
- Weight: 155 lb (70 kg; 11 st 1 lb)
- Division: Lightweight
- Reach: 72 in (183 cm)
- Stance: Orthodox
- Fighting out of: Makhachkala, Dagestan, Russia
- Team: Eagles MMA; American Kickboxing Academy
- Trainer: Abdulmanap Nurmagomedov (former); Javier Mendez; Khabib Nurmagomedov
- Years active: 2017–present

Mixed martial arts record
- Total: 23
- Wins: 22
- By knockout: 9
- By submission: 7
- By decision: 6
- Losses: 0
- No contests: 1

Other information
- Mixed martial arts record from Sherdog

Usman Nurmagomedov
- Status: Released
- Criminal charges: Assault, disturbing public security, causing panic and endangering lives
- Penalty: 6 months in prison 300,000 dirhams fine

Usman Magomednabiyevich Nurmagomedov (Note: Russian: Усман Магомеднабиевич Нурмагомедов) (born 17 April 1998) is a Russian professional mixed martial artist. He currently competes in the Lightweight division as a free agent. He most notably competed in the Professional Fighters League (PFL), where he is the current and inaugural PFL Lightweight Champion. He formerly competed in Bellator MMA, where he was the last Lightweight World Champion. He has also previously competed in the UAE Warriors and Eagle Fighting Championship (then Gorilla Fighting Championship). As of 27 January 2026, he is #1 in the PFL men's pound-for-pound rankings.

He is the younger brother of UFC fighter Umar Nurmagomedov and a cousin of former UFC Lightweight Champion Khabib Nurmagomedov.

== Background ==
Usman Nurmagomedov was born on 17 April 1998 in the city of Kizilyurt, Republic of Dagestan, Russia.

As a child, living in his native village, with his brother Umar Nurmagomedov, he began to attend freestyle wrestling practice at the age of eight. Once his brother Umar began to practice Thai boxing, Usman followed suit.

After moving to Makhachkala, Usman began training with his uncle, Abdulmanap Nurmagomedov at the Eagles MMA camp. There he gained sambo skills and trained alongside teammates such as his cousin Khabib Nurmagomedov and Islam Makhachev. He is of Avar ethnic origin.

== Mixed martial arts career ==
=== Early career ===
Nurmagomedov's professional MMA career began on 26 March 2017, in Moscow at the Moscow Pankration Federation promotion tournament. His opponent was Imran Abdiev. Usman won his first professional fight via armbar in the first round.

Nurmagomedov would continue fighting in various organizations such as the GFC and UAE Warriors, winning his next 10 fights. All but one of these fights were won by a knockout or submission. After winning his 11th professional fight in the Abdulmanap Nurmagomedov Memory Tournament, Usman signed a multi-fight contract with Bellator. According to MMA journalist Ariel Helwani, he is considered to be a "major prospect" in the sport.

=== Bellator MMA ===
In his stateside and Bellator debut on 2 April 2021, at Bellator 255, Nurmagomedov fought Mike Hamel. Primarily using his significant reach advantage, Usman focused on throwing kicks and not letting Hamel get into range. At times when Hamel did close the distance, Nurmagomedov took the fight to the ground. He won the fight via Unanimous Decision.

In his second fight for Bellator on 31 July 2021, at Bellator 263, Nurmagomedov faced Luis "Manny" Muro. After landing a successful knee that caused Muro to fall to the floor, Nurmagomedov followed through with hammerfists causing the referee to stop the fight in round 1.

Nurmagomedov's next fight was at Bellator 269 on 23 October 2021, where he faced Patrik Pietilä at a catchweight bout at 160 lbs. After using his kicks from a distance, Nurmagomedov took the fight to the ground once Pietila closed the distance. Taking his back, Nurmagomedov locked in a rear-naked choke, and won the fight by submission in the first round.

Nurmagomedov then faced Chris Gonzalez on 22 July 2022, at Bellator 283. After tripping Gonzalez, Usman locked in a guillotine choke and got the tap. He won the fight via Submission in the first round.

==== Bellator lightweight champion ====
Nurmagomedov faced Patricky Pitbull for the Bellator Lightweight World Championship at Bellator 288 on 18 November 2022. He defeated him in dominant fashion, winning the belt and the bout via unanimous decision.

==== Lightweight Grand Prix and title defenses ====
Nurmagomedov was announced as one of the participants of the Bellator Lightweight Grand Prix, which has a grand prize of $1 million. On 10 March 2023, Usman defended his title in the quarterfinal of the Grand Prix against former WEC and UFC Lightweight Champion Benson Henderson at Bellator 292. He won the fight quickly, dropping Henderson with a question-mark kick seconds into the fight, and then proceeding to take his back and win the fight with a rear-naked choke.

In the semifinals, Nurmagomedov made his second title defense against former champion Brent Primus on 7 October 2023, at Bellator 300. He originally won the fight by unanimous decision but that result was overturned by CSAC when Nurmagomedov tested positive for a prescription drug that contained a banned substance. He was suspended for 6 months, however due to the accidental nature of the ingestion, he was not stripped of the title.

Nurmagomedov was scheduled to face Alexandr Shabliy for the Bellator Lightweight World Championship on 17 May 2024, at Bellator Champions Series 2. However, Nurmagomedov withdrew due to injury and the bout was scrapped. The bout was rescheduled and eventually took place on 7 September 2024 at Bellator Champions Series 4. Nurmagomedov won the fight by unanimous decision.

Nurmagomedov next defended his championship against former Cage Warriors Featherweight Champion Paul Hughes on 25 January 2025 in the main event of PFL Champions Series 1. Despite a point deduction in round 3 due to an accidental groin shot, he won the fight by majority decision.

=== Professional Fighters League ===
==== PFL Lightweight Champion and title defenses ====
A rematch between Nurmagomedov and Hughes took place at PFL Champions Series 3 as the headliner in Dubai, for the inaugural PFL Lightweight Championship. On 3 October 2025, at Coca-Cola Arena in Dubai, Nurmagomedov won by unanimous decision after five rounds, with judges scoring 50–45, 49–46, and 48–47 in his favor. The disparity in judge scorecards—especially the 50–45 card—led to controversy and debate among fans and media over judging in closely contested fights.

Nurmagomedov made his first defense of the PFL Lightweight Championship against 2025 PFL Lightweight Tournament winner Alfie Davis on 7 February 2026, at PFL Champions Series 5. He won the bout via submission in the third round.

Nurmagomedov made his second title defense against former two-time NCAA Division I championship challenger, Archie Colgan, on 31 July 2026, at PFL New York. He won the fight in the first round by knockout, via punches. He defended the title via knockout in round one. This was the last fight on his contract with PFL.

== Championships and accomplishments ==
- Professional Fighters League
  - PFL Lightweight Championship (One time; current; inaugural)
    - Two successful title defenses
- Bellator MMA
  - Bellator Lightweight World Championship (One time; final)
    - Three successful title defenses
- MMA Fighting
  - 2025 #2 Ranked Fight of the Year vs. Paul Hughes at PFL Champions Series 1

== Incident with Merab Dvalishvili ==
On 11 November 2026, Nurmagomedov and several of his teammates had a physical altercation with UFC fighter Merab Dvalishvili and members of his camp at a hotel in Abu Dhabi. A video which was posted on social media by Ilia Topuria shows Nurmagomedov approaching Dvalishvili from behind as Dvalishvili is being interviewed on camera. Nurmagomedov then strikes Dvalishvili in the face and Dvalishvili retaliates, setting off a brawl. Eight people, including Nurmagomedov and Dvalishvili, were arrested for their participation in the brawl. In addition two people who filmed the incident were also taken into custody. Nurmagomedov and several of his teammates were sentenced to six months' imprisonment in Abu Dhabi and fined AED 300,000 ($80,000) each for their involvement in the brawl. They were also set to be deported from the United Arab Emirates upon completion of their sentences.. Nurmagomedov and his teammates were released from prison early "following reconciliation and mutual withdrawal of claims between the parties".

== Mixed martial arts record ==
Professional record breakdown
23 matches	22 wins	0 losses
By knockout	9	0
By submission	7	0
By decision	6	0
No contests	1	

Res.	Record	Opponent	Method	Event	Date	Round	Time	Location	Notes
Win	22–0 (1)	Archie Colgan	KO (punches)	PFL New York: Nurmagomedov vs. Colgan	31 July 2026	1	3:42	Elmont, New York, United States	Defended the PFL Lightweight Championship.
Win	21–0 (1)	Alfie Davis	Technical Submission (reverse arm-triangle choke)	PFL Dubai: Nurmagomedov vs. Davis	7 February 2026	3	4:41	Dubai, United Arab Emirates	Defended the PFL Lightweight Championship.
Win	20–0 (1)	Paul Hughes	Decision (unanimous)	PFL Champions Series 3	3 October 2025	5	5:00	Dubai, United Arab Emirates	Won the inaugural PFL Lightweight Championship.
Win	19–0 (1)	Paul Hughes	Decision (majority)	PFL Champions Series 1	25 January 2025	5	5:00	Dubai, United Arab Emirates	Defended the Bellator Lightweight World Championship. Nurmagomedov was deducted one point in round 3 due to repeated groin kicks.
Win	18–0 (1)	Alexandr Shabliy	Decision (unanimous)	Bellator Champions Series 4	7 September 2024	5	5:00	San Diego, California, United States	Defended the Bellator Lightweight World Championship.
NC	17–0 (1)	Brent Primus	NC (overturned)	Bellator 300	7 October 2023	5	5:00	San Diego, California, United States	Retained the Bellator Lightweight World Championship. Originally a unanimous decision win for Nurmagomedov; overturned after he tested positive for a banned substance.
Win	17–0	Benson Henderson	Submission (rear-naked choke)	Bellator 292	10 March 2023	1	2:37	San Jose, California, United States	Defended the Bellator Lightweight World Championship.
Win	16–0	Patricky Pitbull	Decision (unanimous)	Bellator 288	18 November 2022	5	5:00	Chicago, Illinois, United States	Won the Bellator Lightweight World Championship.
Win	15–0	Chris Gonzalez	Submission (guillotine choke)	Bellator 283	22 July 2022	1	2:54	Tacoma, Washington, United States	
Win	14–0	Patrik Pietilä	Submission (rear-naked choke)	Bellator 269	23 October 2021	1	4:06	Moscow, Russia	Catchweight (160 lb) bout.
Win	13–0	Manny Muro	TKO (knee to the body)	Bellator 263	31 July 2021	1	3:30	Inglewood, California, United States	
Win	12–0	Mike Hamel	Decision (unanimous)	Bellator 255	2 April 2021	3	5:00	Uncasville, Connecticut, United States	
Win	11–0	Svyatoslav Shabanov	TKO (punches)	FNG / GFC: Abdulmanap Nurmagomedov Memory Tournament	9 September 2020	2	3:37	Moscow, Russia	
Win	10–0	Jerry Kvarnstrom	TKO (punches and elbows)	UAE Warriors 12	31 July 2020	1	2:39	Abu Dhabi, United Arab Emirates	
Win	9–0	Ruslan Tuyakov	TKO (knees)	Gorilla Fighting 24	9 February 2020	2	2:03	Saratov, Russia	
Win	8–0	Roman Golovinov	TKO (punches)	UAE Warriors 9	29 November 2019	1	1:45	Abu Dhabi, United Arab Emirates	
Win	7–0	Kazim Zhakhangirov	Submission (guillotine choke)	Gorilla Fighting 17	27 September 2019	2	1:10	Atyrau, Kazakhstan	
Win	6–0	Ruslan Hisamutdinov	Decision (unanimous)	Gorilla Fighting 15	28 July 2019	3	5:00	Penza, Russia	
Win	5–0	Brian Gonzalez	TKO (punches)	Gorilla Fighting 11	3 March 2019	1	3:14	Penza, Russia	Lightweight debut.
Win	4–0	Romeo Njia	Submission (rear-naked choke)	Battle on Volga 9	17 February 2019	1	4:48	Moscow, Russia	
Win	3–0	Issei Moriyama	TKO (punches)	Brave CF 21	28 December 2018	1	N/A	Jeddah, Saudi Arabia	
Win	2–0	Dmitriy Berestovskiy	TKO (doctor stoppage)	Battle on Volga 8	14 December 2018	1	5:00	Samara, Russia	
Win	1–0	Imran Abdiev	Submission (armbar)	Moscow Pankration Federation: Young Talents Cup 2017	26 March 2017	1	1:51	Moscow, Russia	Featherweight debut.

== See also ==
- List of current Bellator fighters
- List of male mixed martial artists
- List of undefeated mixed martial artists

== Notes ==
Awards and achievements
Preceded by Patricky Pitbull	10th Bellator Lightweight World Champion; 18 November 2022 – 13 August 2025; Title dissolved	Disbanded
New championship	1st PFL Lightweight Champion; 3 October 2025 – present	Incumbent
