= PFL MENA 1 (2025) =

Professional Fighters League MMA event in 2025

- The poster for PFL MENA 1
- Promotion: Professional Fighters League
- Date: May 9, 2025
- Venue: Onyx Arena
- City: Jeddah, Saudi Arabia

Event chronology
PFL 4	PFL MENA 1	PFL Europe 1

PFL MENA 1: 2025 First Round was a mixed martial arts event produced by the Professional Fighters League that took place on May 9, 2025, at Onyx Arena in Jeddah, Saudi Arabia.

== Background ==
The event marked the promotion's first visit to Jeddah. This event partnered with Jeddah Season to elevated the sport of MMA in the Middle East.

This event featured the quarterfinals of the 2025 PFL MENA Tournament in a lightweight and featherweight divisions.

== Results ==
Main card (DAZN / StarzPlay)
Weight class				Method	Round	Time	Notes
Lightweight	Mohsen Mohammadseifi	def.	Ahmed El Sisy	Decision (unanimous) (30–27, 30–27, 30–27)	3	5:00	(Note: 2025 PFL MENA Lightweight Tournament Quarterfinal.)
Lightweight	Salah Eddine Hamli	def.	Abbas Khan	Submission (rear-naked choke)	3	2:05	(Note: 2025 PFL MENA Lightweight Tournament Quarterfinal.)
Featherweight	Taha Bendaoud	def.	Drissi Boualem	Submission (triangle choke)	1	2:07	(Note: 2025 PFL MENA Featherweight Tournament Quarterfinal.)
Flyweight	Malik Basahel	def.	Mountasser Boutouta	TKO (elbows and punches)	2	2:32
Featherweight	Assem Ghanem	def.	Hussien Salem	Decision (unanimous) (30–25, 30–25, 30–26)	3	5:00	(Note: 2025 PFL MENA Featherweight Tournament Quarterfinal. Salem was deducted one point in round 1 due to sticking his toes in the cage.)
Featherweight	Islam Reda	def.	Akram Nasri	TKO (punches)	3	4:33	(Note: 2025 PFL MENA Featherweight Tournament Quarterfinal.)
Preliminary card (DAZN / StarzPlay)
Lightweight	Mohammad Fahmi	def.	Georges Eid	Submission (brabo choke)	1	3:13	(Note: 2025 PFL MENA Lightweight Tournament Quarterfinal.)
Lightweight	Ahmed Makki	def.	Hasham Elnamer	Submission (heel hook)	3	2:02
Lightweight	Souhil Taïri	def.	Abdullah Saleem	TKO (knee and punches)	2	3:21	(Note: 2025 PFL MENA Lightweight Tournament Quarterfinal. Taïri was deducted one point in round 1 due to an illegal kick.)
Women's Featherweight	Eman Almudhaf	def.	Shamara Braga	Decision (split) (28–29, 29–28, 29–28)	3	5:00
Amateur bouts
Catchweight (166 lb)	Abdulaziz bin Moammar	def.	Fares Hamdani	Decision (unanimous) (29–28, 29–28, 29–28)	3	3:00

== Tournament brackets ==
=== 2025 PFL MENA Lightweight Tournament ===
Quarter-finals
(Iran) Mohsen Mohammadseifi	UD
(Egypt) Ahmed El Sisy	3
(Lebanon) Georges Eid	1
(Iraq) Mohammad Fahmi	SUB
(Morocco) Salah Eddine Hamli	SUB
(Bahrain) Abbas Khan	3
(Kuwait) Abdullah Saleem	2
(Algeria) Souhil Taïri	TKO

Semi-finals
(Iran) Mohsen Mohammadseifi
(Iraq) Mohammad Fahmi
(Morocco) Salah Eddine Hamli
(Algeria) Souhil Taïri

Final

=== 2025 PFL MENA Featherweight Tournament ===
Quarter-finals
(Algeria) Akram Nasri (Note: Abdullah Al-Qahtani withdrew due to injury and was replaced by Akram Nasri.)	3
(Egypt) Islam Reda	TKO
(Algeria) Drissi Boualem (Note: Abdelrahman Alhyasat withdrew due to weight cut issues and was replaced by Drissi Boualem.)	1
(Morocco) Taha Bendaoud	SUB
(Jordan) Izzeddine Al Derbani	—
(Algeria) Yanis Ghemmouri (Note: Al Derbani pulled out of the bout due to medical issues and Ghemmouri therefore got a bye to the semi-finals)	BYE
(Iraq) Hussein Salem	3
(Egypt) Assem Ghanem	UD

Semi-finals
(Egypt) Islam Reda
(Morocco) Taha Bendaoud
(Algeria) Yanis Ghemmouri
(Egypt) Assem Ghanem

Final

== See also ==
- 2025 in Professional Fighters League
- List of PFL events
- List of current PFL fighters
