= Manapkala =

Manapkala Манапкала
- Selo

Other transcription(s)
  - Avar: ЦІияб Силди
- Interactive map of Manapkala
- Location of Manapkala Manapkala (Republic of Dagestan)
- Coordinates: 43°14′10″N 46°50′49″E
- Country: Russia
- Federal subject: Dagestan
- Administrative district: Kizilyurtovsky District

Population
  - Estimate (2025): 3,595 )
- Time zone: UTC+3 (MSK)
- Postal code: 368112
- OKTMO ID: 82626425101

Manapkala (Russian: Манапкала; Avar: ЦІияб Силди), known as Kirovaul prior to 2023, is a rural locality (a selo) in Kizilyurtovsky District of the Republic of Dagestan, Russia.

== History ==
In 2010, Kirovaul was the scene of some fatal shooting incidents.

== Notable people ==
- Khabib Nurmagomedov, Two-time Combat Sambo World Champion and the former UFC Lightweight Champion.
