= Paul Hughes (fighter) =

Mixed martial arts (MMA) fighter

- Born: 27 March 1997 (age 29); Sydney, Australia
- Other names: Big News
- Height: 5 ft 9 in (1.75 m)
- Weight: 155 lb (70 kg; 11 st 1 lb)
- Division: Featherweight; Lightweight
- Reach: 70 in (178 cm)
- Fighting out of: Belfast, Northern Ireland
- Team: Fight Academy Ireland
- Years active: 2017–present

Mixed martial arts record
- Total: 17
- Wins: 14
- By knockout: 7
- By submission: 3
- By decision: 4
- Losses: 3
- By decision: 3

Amateur record
- Total: 10
- Wins: 8
- By submission: 3
- Losses: 2

Other information
- Mixed martial arts record from Sherdog

Paul Hughes (born 27 March 1997) is a professional mixed martial artist from Northern Ireland who currently competes in the Lightweight division of the Professional Fighters League (PFL). A professional since 2017, Hughes is a former Cage Warriors Featherweight Champion. As of February 12, 2026, he is #4 in the PFL lightweight rankings.

== Background ==
Born on March 27, 1997, in Sydney, Australia, Hughes grew up in Lavey, County Londonderry, Northern Ireland, where he initially participated in sports like Gaelic football and hurling before transitioning to MMA. His professional MMA career began in 2017, debuting at BAMMA 28 and winning in 92 seconds.

== Mixed martial arts career ==
=== Cage Warriors ===
Hughes first gained attention in the European MMA scene with Cage Warriors, where he won the Interim Featherweight Championship by defeating Morgan Charrière via majority decision at Cage Warriors 128. He later unified the title by winning a rematch against Jordan Vucenic by unanimous decision at Cage Warriors 145. This bout avenged his only career loss, which he suffered in a close split decision to Vucenic in 2020. Hughes was the first Irish fighter since Conor McGregor to become Cage Warriors Featherweight Champion. Following a first-round knockout win over Fabiano Silva at Cage Warriors 170, Hughes left the promotion and became a free agent. He eventually signed with the Professional Fighters League (PFL).

=== Professional Fighters League / Bellator MMA ===
Hughes made his debut by defeating Bobby King via technical knockout in the second round at Bellator Champions Series 3 on June 22, 2024. This victory set the stage for a significant challenge against A.J. McKee, a former Bellator Featherweight Champion, at PFL Super Fights: Battle of the Giants on October 19, 2024. He won the fight by split decision.

Hughes challenged Usman Nurmagomedov for the Bellator Lightweight World Championship on January 25, 2025 in the main event of PFL Champions Series 1. He lost the fight via majority decision.

Hughes faced Bruno Miranda in the main event on May 10, 2025, at PFL Europe 1. He won the fight via TKO 42 seconds into the first round.

Hughes rematched Usman Nurmagomedov for the PFL Lightweight Championship on October 3, 2025, at PFL Champions Series 3. He lost the bout via unanimous decision.

Hughes was scheduled to face Jay-Jay Wilson in the main event on April 16, 2026, at PFL Belfast. However, Hughes withdrew due to a knee injury while training and was replaced by undefeated prospect Darragh Kelly.

== Championships and accomplishments ==
- Cage Warriors
  - Cage Warriors Featherweight Championship
  - Cage Warriors Interim Featherweight Championship
- Cage Conflict
  - Cage Conflict Featherweight Championship
  - Cage Conflict Lightweight Championship
- Fight Matrix
  - 2024 Most Improved Fighter of the Year
  - 2024 Most Lopsided Upset of the Year vs. A. J. McKee at PFL Super Fights: Battle of the Giants
- LowKick MMA
  - 2022 Prospect of the Year
- MMA Fighting
  - 2025 #2 Ranked Fight of the Year vs. Usman Nurmagomedov at PFL Champions Series 1

== Mixed martial arts record ==
Professional record breakdown
17 matches	14 wins	3 losses
By knockout	7	0
By submission	3	0
By decision	4	3

Res.	Record	Opponent	Method	Event	Date	Round	Time	Location	Notes
Loss	14–3	Usman Nurmagomedov	Decision (unanimous)	PFL Champions Series 3	October 3, 2025	5	5:00	Dubai, United Arab Emirates	For the inaugural PFL Lightweight Championship.
Win	14–2	Bruno Miranda	TKO (punches)	PFL Europe 1 (2025)	May 10, 2025	1	0:42	Belfast, Northern Ireland	
Loss	13–2	Usman Nurmagomedov	Decision (majority)	PFL Champions Series 1	January 25, 2025	5	5:00	Dubai, United Arab Emirates	For the Bellator Lightweight World Championship. Nurmagomedov was deducted one point in round 3 due to repeated groin kicks.
Win	13–1	A. J. McKee	Decision (split)	PFL Super Fights: Battle of the Giants	October 19, 2024	3	5:00	Riyadh, Saudi Arabia	
Win	12–1	Bobby King	TKO (punches and elbows)	Bellator Champions Series 3	June 22, 2024	2	4:50	Dublin, Ireland	
Win	11–1	Fabiano Silva	TKO (knee and elbows)	Cage Warriors 170	April 6, 2024	1	4:37	Dublin, Ireland	Catchweight (160 lb) bout.
Win	10–1	Jan Quaeyhaegens	KO (punches)	Cage Warriors 161	October 14, 2023	1	2:47	Dublin, Ireland	Return to Lightweight.
Win	9–1	Jordan Vucenic	Decision (unanimous)	Cage Warriors 145	November 4, 2022	5	5:00	London, England	Won and unified the Cage Warriors Featherweight Championship.
Win	8–1	Morgan Charrière	Decision (majority)	Cage Warriors 128	October 1, 2021	5	5:00	London, England	Won the interim Cage Warriors Featherweight Championship.
Win	7–1	James Hendin	Decision (unanimous)	Cage Warriors 120	March 18, 2021	3	5:00	London, England	
Loss	6–1	Jordan Vucenic	Decision (split)	Cage Warriors 119	December 12, 2020	3	5:00	London, England	
Win	6–0	Aidan Stephen	Submission (rear-naked choke)	Cage Warriors 116	August 11, 2020	3	4:21	Manchester, England	Return to Featherweight.
Win	5–0	Youri Panada	KO (head kick)	Cage Warriors 112	March 7, 2020	2	2:33	Manchester, England	Catchweight (150 lb) bout.
Win	4–0	Kalifa Seydi	Submission (rear-naked choke)	Cage Conflict 2	October 26, 2019	1	1:43	Belfast, Northern Ireland	Lightweight debut. Won the inaugural Cage Conflict Lightweight Championship.
Win	3–0	Mateusz Makarowski	Submission (rear-naked choke)	Cage Warriors: Unplugged 2	September 6, 2019	1	2:34	London, England	Catchweight (164 lb) bout.
Win	2–0	Stephen O'Neill	TKO (punches)	Cage Conflict 1	March 9, 2019	1	3:00	Belfast, Northern Ireland	Won the inaugural Cage Conflict Featherweight Championship.
Win	1–0	Adam Gustab	TKO (punches)	BAMMA 28	February 24, 2017	1	1:32	Belfast, Northern Ireland	Featherweight debut.

== See also ==
- List of current PFL fighters
- List of current Bellator MMA fighters
- List of male mixed martial artists
