= Javier Mendez (mixed martial arts trainer) =

American mixed martial arts coach

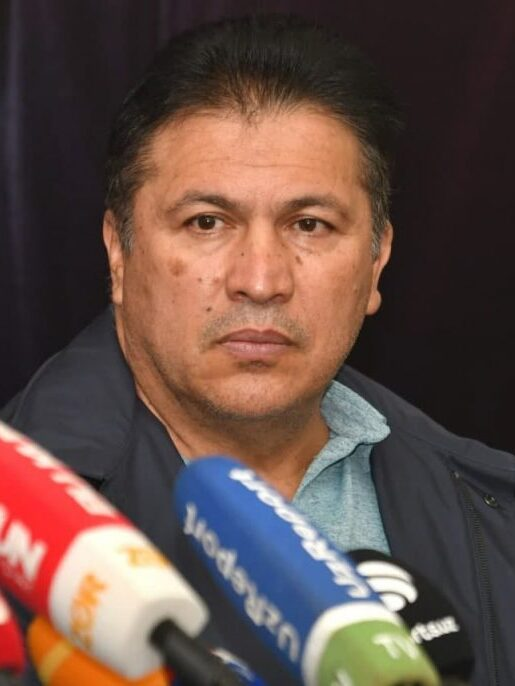
- Mendez in 2020
- Born: September 18, 1970 (age 56); Mexico
- Nationality: Mexican and American
- Division: Light Cruiserweight; Light Heavyweight
- Style: Kickboxing
- Team: American Kickboxing Academy

Javier Mendez (born September 18, 1970) is a Mexican-American mixed martial arts (MMA) coach and founder of the MMA gym American Kickboxing Academy (AKA). He is a former two-time ISKA full contact light cruiserweight and oriental rules light heavyweight kickboxing world champion. He is best known for being the coach and mentor to multiple MMA world champions, most famously Khabib Nurmagomedov, Islam Makhachev, Luke Rockhold, Frank Shamrock, Daniel Cormier and Cain Velasquez. Javier holds the distinction as the first man to coach multiple two-division UFC world champions (Daniel Cormier and Islam Makhachev).

== History ==
Javier Mendez was born in Mexico and moved to the United States with his family at the age of six. He was raised in San Jose, California and attended Andrew Hill High School. His father spent most of his money on alcohol and gambling and told Mendez that he would never amount to anything which gave Mendez motivation to achieve success. Like most of his peers of his generation, Mendez grew up admiring the late Bruce Lee. Mendez started training in martial arts in 1978, studying the discipline of Tang Soo Do. From there, he went to West Coast Tae Kwon Do and trained under Scott Coker (former CEO of Strikeforce and former president of Bellator MMA). Mendez started his kickboxing career in 1985 and shortly thereafter he established the American Kickboxing Academy (AKA) where he held training sessions with a small group of students. After fighting his way through the kickboxing ranks, Mendez won his first world championship in 1992 when he became the ISKA Light-Cruiserweight Champion. In 1995, Mendez defeated Conrad Pla (one of the founder of Tristar Gym) via split decision to win the vacant ISKA Light Heavyweight Championship.

In 1996, Mendez became exposed to mixed martial arts (MMA) when local UFC fighter Brian Johnston sought out Mendez to help him improve his kickboxing ability. Such exposure led other fighters to seek out Mendez as he rode the wave of MMA's growing popularity. Going forward, Mendez stopped competing professionally as a fighter to become a full-time MMA coach. Mendez would train his first UFC champion in 1997, when Frank Shamrock joined AKA. He would be his trainer until 2003; during that period, Shamrock became the first UFC Light Heavyweight Champion and remained undefeated.

Due to hearing about this successful partnership, B.J. Penn joined AKA in 2001 in preparation of his MMA career debut and would eventually become UFC champion in both the lightweight and welterweight divisions.

In 2015, Mendez became the only trainer to have three concurrent UFC champions: Cain Velasquez at heavyweight, Daniel Cormier at light heavyweight and Luke Rockhold at middleweight.

In November 2022, Mendez coached Usman Nurmagomedov to Bellator lightweight champion.

In January 2023, MMAjunkie.com awarded Mendez and Khabib Nurmagomedov as 2022 coaches of the year.

== Notable fighters trained ==
=== Mixed martial arts ===
- Frank Shamrock (former UFC Light Heavyweight Champion, former Strikeforce Middleweight Champion, former WEC Light Heavyweight Champion, Interim King of Pancrase)
- Maurice Smith (former UFC Heavyweight Champion)
- B.J. Penn (former UFC Lightweight Champion and UFC Welterweight Champion)
- Cung Le (former Strikeforce Middleweight Champion)
- Muhammad Lawal (former Strikeforce Light Heavyweight Champion and Rizin 100kg World Grand Prix Champion)
- Jon Fitch (Former WSOF Welterweight Champion)
- Cain Velasquez (former two time UFC Heavyweight champion)
- Daniel Cormier (former UFC Heavyweight Champion, former UFC Light Heavyweight Champion, former Strikeforce Heavyweight Grand Prix Champion)
- Luke Rockhold (former UFC Middleweight Champion, former Strikeforce Middleweight Champion)
- Josh Thomson (former Strikeforce Lightweight Champion)
- Khabib Nurmagomedov (former UFC Lightweight Champion)
- Islam Makhachev (former UFC Lightweight Champion and current UFC Welterweight Champion)
- Usman Nurmagomedov (former Bellator Lightweight Champion and current PFL Lightweight World Champion)
- Gadzhi Rabadanov (2024 PFL Lightweight Tournament winner)

=== Others ===
- Herschel Walker (former professional football player, 1982 Heisman Trophy winner)

== Awards ==
- MMA Junkie
  - 2022 Coach of the Year w. Khabib Nurmagomedov
