= American Kickboxing Academy =

Martial arts gym in San Jose, California

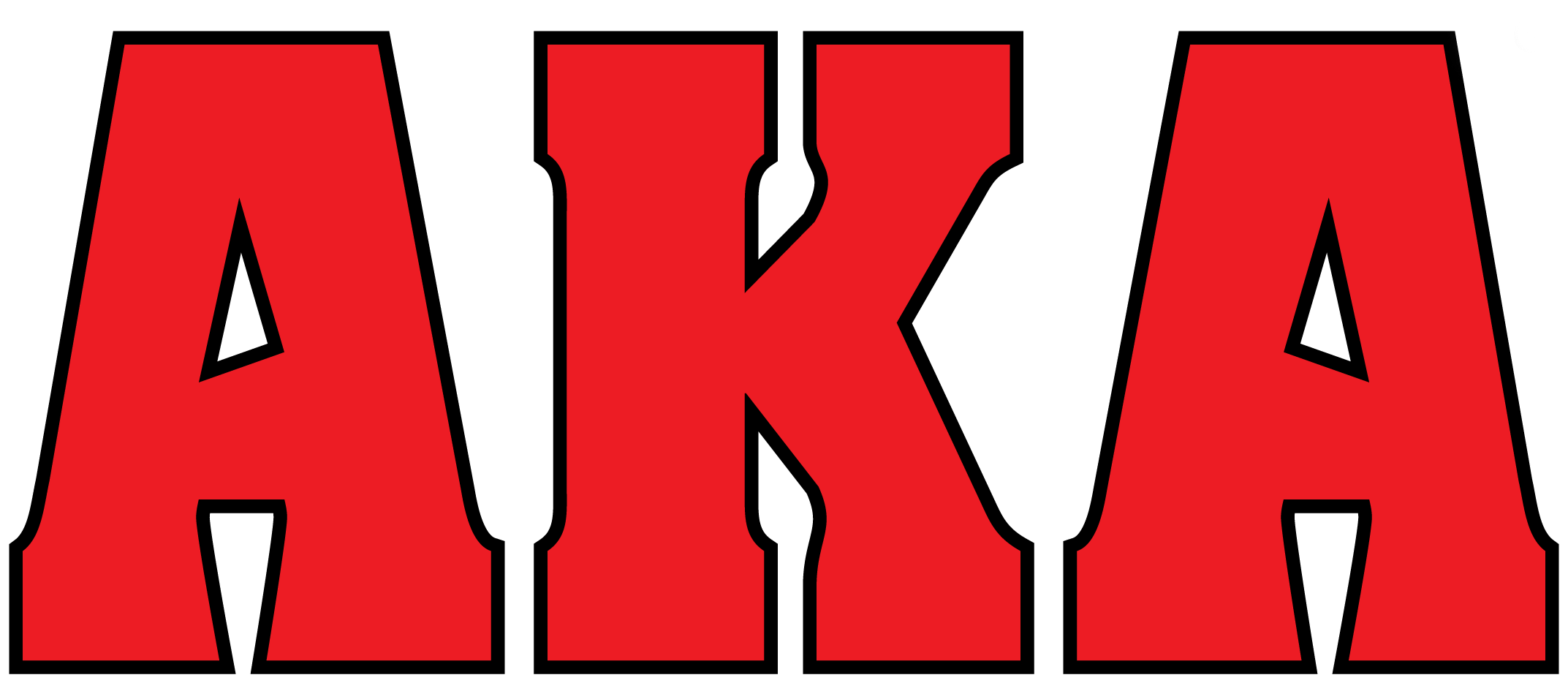
- Est.: 1985; 41 years ago
- Founded by: Javier Mendez
- Primary owners: Javier Mendez
- Primary trainers: Javier Mendez; Bob Cook; Rosendo Sanchez; Leandro Vieira; Daniel Cormier
- Prominent fighters: Daniel Cormier; Khabib Nurmagomedov; Islam Makhachev; Usman Nurmagomedov; B.J. Penn; Cain Velasquez; Luke Rockhold; Josh Thomson; Jon Fitch; Mike Swick
- Training facilities: San Jose, California, U.S. Phuket, Thailand
- Website: www.akakickbox.com

The American Kickboxing Academy (AKA) is a mixed martial arts gym based in San Jose, California. It is one of the pioneering schools of mixed martial arts (MMA). In 2014, AKA opened the AKA Thailand gym in Phuket, Thailand. Prominent trainers include Brazilian Jiu-Jitsu master Leandro Vieira, Bob Cook, Derek Yuen, Javier Mendez, and Andy Fong. Within the facility, Muay Thai, kickboxing, Brazilian jiu-jitsu, wrestling and boxing classes are taught. Additional programs include conditioning and circuit training with TRX Suspension and Combat Circuit. The AKA is one of the top professional MMA training camps.

== Dispute with the Ultimate Fighting Championship ==
In 2008, the AKA was involved in a brief dispute with Ultimate Fighting Championship (UFC) President Dana White over the exclusive license rights for a UFC video game. Members of the AKA who were signed with the UFC, including Jon Fitch, Christian Wellisch, Josh Koscheck, and former UFC heavyweight champion Cain Velasquez, refused to sign an exclusive lifetime contract for their video game licenses over to the UFC, causing them to be cut from the UFC's roster. Within 24 hours, the dispute was resolved and all fighters signed back into the organization.

AKA has also been criticized by MMA fans and journalists, as well as by Dana White, for what is perceived as an excessively high rate of training injuries leading to fight cancellations among its stable of fighters.

== Notable fighters ==
=== Mixed martial artists ===
==== Current ====
- Islam Makhachev (UFC Welterweight Champion, Former UFC Lightweight Champion)
- Usman Nurmagomedov (Bellator Lightweight Champion)
- Umar Nurmagomedov (UFC)
- Tagir Ulanbekov (UFC)
- Tai Tuivasa (UFC)
- Arjan Bhullar (ONE FC)
- Islam Mamedov (PFL, Bellator)
- Gabriel Benítez (UFC)
- Zubaira Tukhugov (PFL, UFC)
- Abubakar Nurmagomedov (PFL, UFC)
- Kyle Crutchmer (Bellator)
- Enrique Barzola (UFC, PFL, ACA)
- Blagoy Ivanov (UFC, PFL, WSOF)

==== Notable alumni ====
- Khabib Nurmagomedov (Former UFC Lightweight Champion)
- Daniel Cormier (Former UFC Heavyweight Champion, Former UFC Light Heavyweight Champion)
- Cain Velasquez (Former two-time UFC Heavyweight Champion)
- Luke Rockhold (Former UFC Middleweight Champion, former Strikeforce Middleweight Champion) *B.J. Penn (Former UFC Lightweight Champion, Former UFC Welterweight Champion)
- Leon Edwards (Former UFC Welterweight Champion)
- Germaine de Randamie (Former UFC Women's Featherweight Champion, Strikeforce)
- Frank Shamrock (Former UFC Light Heavyweight Champion, Strikeforce)
- Miesha Tate (UFC, Strikeforce)
- Sean Sherk (Former UFC Lightweight Champion)
- Liam McGeary (Former Bellator Light Heavyweight Champion)
- Muhammed Lawal (Former Strikeforce Light Heavyweight Champion, Bellator)
- Josh Thomson (Former Strikeforce Lightweight Champion, UFC)
- Cung Le (Former Strikeforce Middleweight Champion, UFC)
- Josh Koscheck (UFC)
- Jon Fitch (UFC, WSOF)
- Mike Swick (UFC)
- Gray Maynard (UFC)
- Dan Ige (UFC)
- Ed Ruth (Bellator)
- Alejandro Pérez (UFC)
- Shawn Bunch (Bellator, Eagle FC)
- Deron Winn (UFC, Bellator)
- Andre Fialho (UFC, Bellator)
- Ruslan Magomedov (UFC)
- Phil Baroni (UFC, PRIDE)
- Bobby Lashley (Bellator, Strikeforce)
- Herschel Walker (Strikeforce)
- Paul Buentello (UFC, Strikeforce)
- Tyson Griffin (UFC, Strikeforce)
- Mike Kyle (Strikeforce, WSOF)
- Trevor Prangley (UFC, Strikeforce)
- Justin Wilcox (Strikeforce, Bellator)
- Lavar Johnson (UFC, Strikeforce)
- Billy Evangelista (Strikeforce)
- Ousmane Thomas Diagne (Bellator, Strikeforce)
- Brianna Fortino (UFC, Invicta FC)
- Marius Žaromskis (Bellator, DREAM)
- Brian Johnston (UFC, New Japan Pro Wrestling)
- Ron Keslar (Bellator, Strikeforce)
- Kyle Kingsbury (UFC)
- Daniel Puder (Strikeforce)
- Nate Moore (Strikeforce)
- Rich Crunkilton (WEC)
- Christian Wellisch (UFC, WEC)
- Tony Johnson (One FC, Bellator)
- Todd Duffee (KSW, UFC)

=== Kickboxers ===
- Travis Johnson

=== Boxers ===
- Ricardo Cortes
- Matt Jannazzo

=== Wrestlers ===
- Khadzhimurat Gatsalov
- Jamill Kelly
- Nick Piccininni

== Awards ==
- MMAJunkie.com
  - 2015 Gym of the Year
- CombatPress.com
  - 2018 Gym of the Year

== See also ==
- List of professional MMA training camps
