= PFL Europe 1 (2025) =

Professional Fighters League MMA event in 2025

- The poster for PFL Europe 1
- Promotion: Professional Fighters League
- Date: May 10, 2025
- Venue: SSE Arena
- City: Belfast, Northern Ireland

Event chronology
PFL MENA 1	PFL Europe 1	PFL Paris 2025

PFL Europe 1: 2025 Belfast was a mixed martial arts event produced by the Professional Fighters League that took place on May 10, 2025, at the SSE Arena in Belfast, Northern Ireland.

== Background ==
The event marked the promotion's debut in Northern Ireland.

A lightweight bout between former Cage Warriors Featherweight Champion Paul Hughes and Bruno Miranda headlined the event.

This event also featured the quarterfinal of the 2025 PFL Europe Tournament in a lightweight division.

Originally scheduled as a middleweight bout, the bout between Haider Khan and Sean McCormac was changed to 195 pounds catchweight, with Khan weighed in at 194.1 pounds and McCormac at 188 pounds and the heavier Khan was fined 20% of his purse by hitting the scales eight pounds over the 186-pound limit.

== Results ==
Main card (DAZN)
Weight class				Method	Round	Time	Notes
Lightweight	Paul Hughes	def.	Bruno Miranda	TKO (punches)	1	0:42
Bantamweight	Lewis McGrillen	def.	Alan Philpott	Submission (rear-naked choke)	2	3:17
Lightweight	Connor Hughes	def.	Sebastien Di Franco	KO (punch)	2	2:46	(Note: 2025 PFL Europe Lightweight Tournament Quarterfinal.)
Lightweight	Gino van Steenis	def.	Decky McAleenan	Decision (unanimous) (29–28, 29–28, 29–28)	3	5:00	(Note: 2025 PFL Europe Lightweight Tournament Quarterfinal.)
Catchweight (195 lb)	Haider Khan	def.	Sean McCormac	Decision (unanimous) (29–28, 29–28, 30–27)	3	5:00
Lightweight	Aleksandr Chizov	def.	Mark Ewen	TKO (punches)	1	1:33	(Note: 2025 PFL Europe Lightweight Tournament Quarterfinal.)
Lightweight	Claudio Pacella	def.	Gavin Hughes	Decision (unanimous) (29–28, 29–28, 30–27)	3	5:00	(Note: 2025 PFL Europe Lightweight Tournament Quarterfinal.)
Preliminary card (YouTube / DAZN)
Welterweight	Eoin Sheridan	def.	Malichi Edwards	KO (punches)	1	1:53
Women's Flyweight	Gemma Auld	def.	Sammy-Jo Luxton	Submission (rear-naked choke)	2	2:43
Featherweight	Corey McLaughlin	def.	Nahom Wedi	Decision (unanimous) (30–27, 30–27, 29–28)	3	5:00

== Tournament brackets ==
=== 2025 PFL Europe Lightweight Tournament ===
Quarter-finals
(Republic of Ireland) Decky McAleenan	3
(Spain) Gino van Steenis	UD
(England) Connor Hughes	KO
(Belgium) Sebastien Di Franco	1
(England) Gavin Hughes	3
(Italy) Claudio Pacella	UD
(Scotland) Mark Ewen	1
(Latvia) Aleksandr Chizov	TKO

Semi-finals
(Spain) Gino van Steenis
(England) Connor Hughes
(Italy) Claudio Pacella
(Latvia) Aleksandr Chizov

Final

== See also ==
- 2025 in Professional Fighters League
- List of PFL events
- List of current PFL fighters
