= Abdulmanap Nurmagomedov =

Soviet-Russian (Dagestani) wrestling coach (1962–2020)

- Абдулманап Нурмагомедов
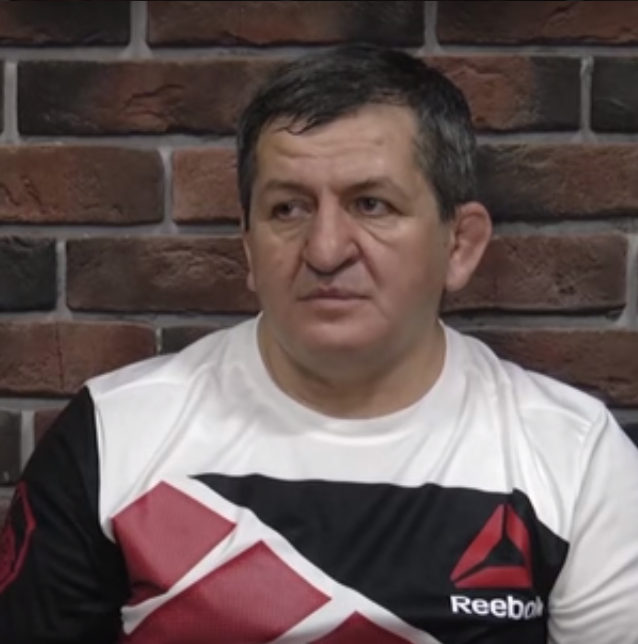
- Nurmagomedov in 2016
- Born: Abdulmanap Magomedovich Nurmagomedov; 10 December 1962; Sildi, Dagestan ASSR, Russian SFSR, Soviet Union (now Sildi, Dagestan, Russia)
- Died: 3 July 2020 (aged 57); Moscow, Russia
- Education: Poltava University of Economics and Trade
- Occupations: Athlete, coach
- Children: 3, including Khabib
- Relatives: Nurmagomed Nurmagomedov (brother)
- Honours: Honored Coach of Russia; Senior coach of the national team of the Republic of Dagestan; Master of sports of the USSR in freestyle wrestling

Abdulmanap Magomedovich Nurmagomedov (Russian: Абдулманап Магомедович Нурмагомедов; 10 December 1962 – 3 July 2020) was a Russian military veteran, former judoka, and combat sports coach. In September 2019, he was named by the Russian Book of Records as the most successful combat sambo coach in the country. He was the head coach of Eagles MMA and had coached two UFC world champions, his son Khabib Nurmagomedov as well as Islam Makhachev.

== Biography ==
An ethnic Avar, Nurmagomedov was born on December 10, 1962 in the village of Sildi, Tsumadinsky District. In 1987 he graduated from the Poltava University of Economics and Trade with a degree in accounting and economics. He had two sons, Magomed and Khabib, and one daughter, Amina. He started his sporting career with freestyle wrestling, which he, like many Dagestani children, had practiced from a young age. While serving in the Soviet Army, he began to practice judo and sambo.

His first big success as a coach came when his brother, Nurmagomed Nurmagomedov, won at the World Sambo Championship for Ukraine's national team in 1992. He trained a total of 18 world champions through his coaching career.

At the end of April 2020, during the COVID-19 pandemic in Russia, Nurmagomedov was hospitalized in the 2nd city hospital of Makhachkala with bilateral pneumonia caused by COVID-19. Having been taken to Moscow in early May on a private jet, his condition rapidly worsened, and he died there on 3 July 2020, from COVID complications. He was 57 years old. On 4 July, he was buried in his native village. Following his death, his son Khabib announced his retirement from mixed martial arts after his victory over Justin Gaethje at UFC 254, a fight which he dedicated to the memory of his father.

== Notable students ==
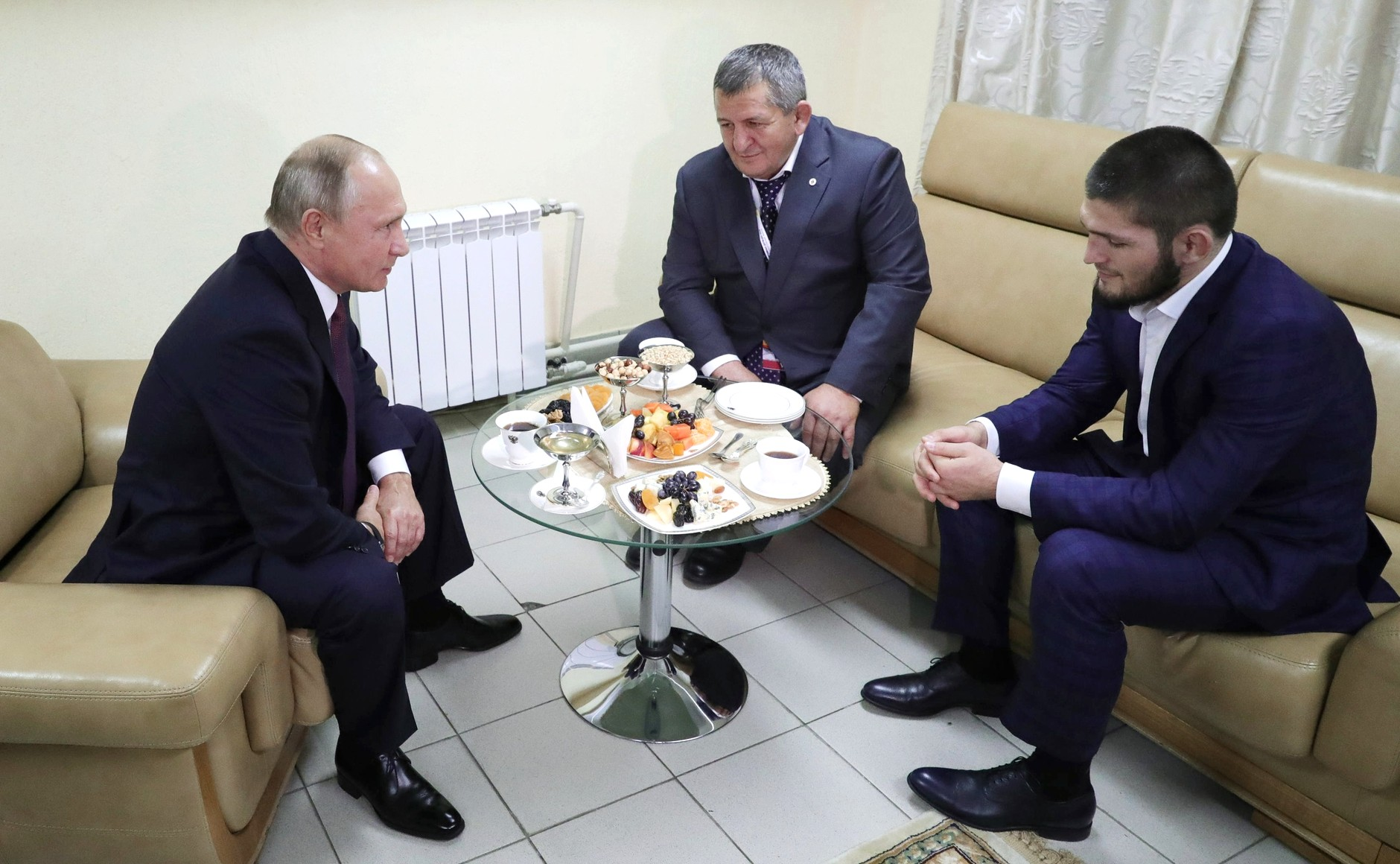
Nurmagomedov and his son Khabib meeting Russian President Vladimir Putin four days after the latter's win against Conor McGregor

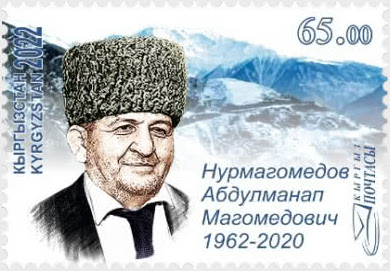
Nurmagomedov on a 2022 stamp of Kyrgyzstan

=== Mixed martial arts ===
- Khabib Nurmagomedov – former UFC Lightweight Champion. Two-time WCSF Sambo World Champion.
- Islam Makhachev – current UFC Welterweight Champion and former UFC Lightweight Champion. 2016 FIAS Combat Sambo World Champion.
- Sultan Aliev – two-time FIAS Combat Sambo World Champion. Formerly competed in UFC and Bellator from 2011 to 2019.
- Rustam Khabilov – Bellator Welterweight. 2007 WCSF Sambo World Champion.
- Umar Nurmagomedov – UFC Bantamweight. 2015 WCSF Sambo World Champion.
- Usman Nurmagomedov - PFL Lightweight World Champion
- Tagir Ulanbekov – UFC Flyweight

=== Wrestling ===
- Abasgadzhi Magomedov – Freestyle wrestling World Champion.
- Magomedkhabib Kadimagomedov – 2020 Olympic Silver Medalist.
