= Sildi =

Sildi Сильди
- Selo
- Location within Republic of Dagestan Location within Russia
- Coordinates: 42°27′11″N 45°55′40″E
- Country: Russia
- Region: Republic of Dagestan
- District: Tsumadinsky District

Population (2010)
  - Total: 208
- Time zone: UTC+3:00

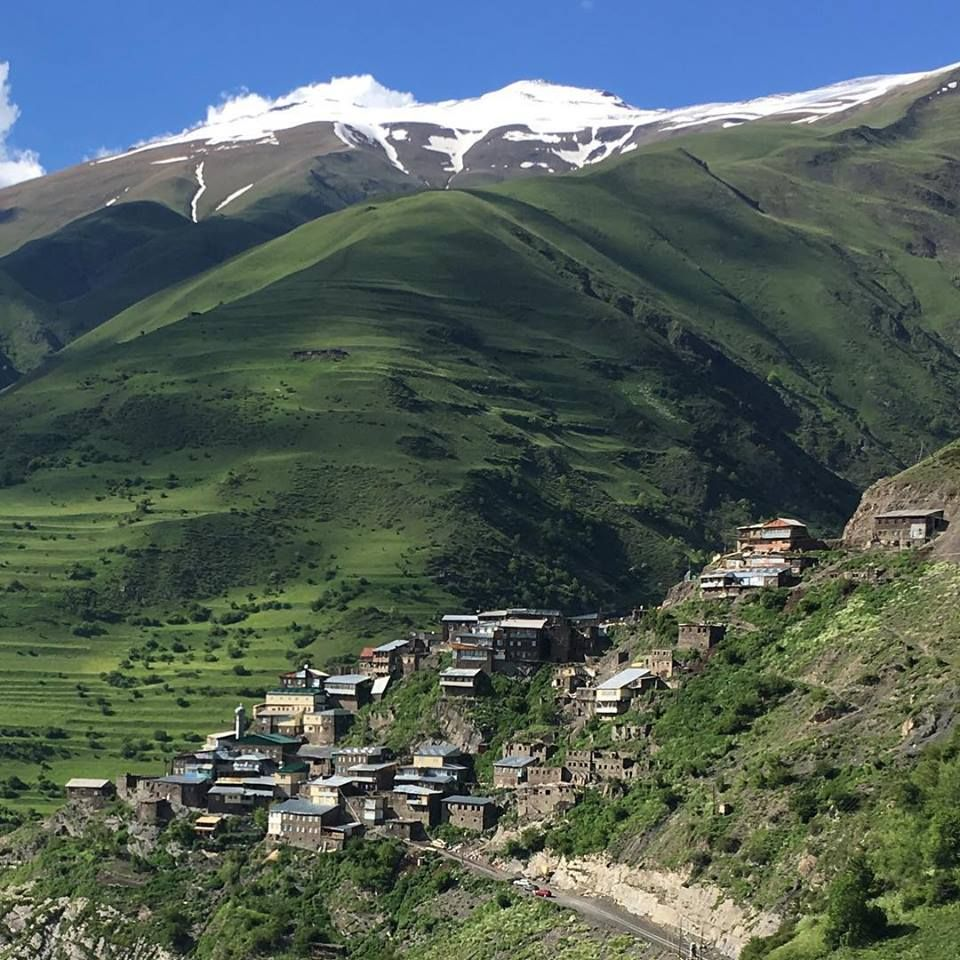
Village of Sildi during the day.

Sildi (Russian: Сильди; Avar: Силди) is a rural locality (a selo) in the Tsumadinsky District in the Republic of Dagestan, Russia. It has a population of 208 and is located approximately 1,932 meters above sea level. The village is lied within the Caucasus Mountains in Russia. Sildi is located approximately ten miles from Russia's border with Georgia.

It is the hometown of retired UFC Lightweight Champion Khabib Nurmagomedov, widely described as one of the greatest MMA fighters of all time. It is also the hometown of Khabib's father, Abdulmanap Nurmagomedov, regarded as one of the greatest MMA coaches ever. The village was brought to fame by the Nurmagomedovs, and in May 2025, Khabib Nurmagomedov opened an MMA training center in Sildi.

== Notable people ==
- Khabib Nurmagomedov, former UFC lightweight champion.
- Abdulmanap Nurmagomedov, combat sports trainer.
