= PFL Champions Series 1 =

Mixed martial arts event in 2025

PFL Champions Series 1: Nurmagomedov vs. Hughes
- The poster for PFL Champions Series 1: Nurmagomedov vs. Hughes
- Promotion: Professional Fighters League
- Date: January 25, 2025
- Venue: Coca-Cola Arena
- City: Dubai, United Arab Emirates

Event chronology
PFL Europe 4	PFL Champions Series 1: Nurmagomedov vs. Hughes	PFL 1

PFL Champions Series 1: Nurmagomedov vs. Hughes (also known as PFL Champions Series - Road to Dubai) was a mixed martial arts event produced by Professional Fighters League that took place on January 25, 2025, at Coca-Cola Arena in Dubai, United Arab Emirates.

== Background ==
The event marked the organization debut in United Arab Emirates.

The Champion Series 6 event was initially scheduled to take place under the Bellator MMA banner on November 16, 2024 at Adidas Arena in Paris, France with a Bantamweight title bout between Patchy Mix and Leandro Higo as the main event. However, this event was later cancelled due to unspecified reasons.

A Bellator Lightweight World Championship bout between current champion Usman Nurmagomedov and Paul Hughes headlined the event.

A heavyweight bout between former Bellator Light Heavyweight Champion Vadim Nemkov and 2022 PFL heavyweight winner Ante Delija was scheduled for the event. However, Delija withdrew due to not ever signing the contract due to him undergoing elbow surgery and was replaced by current light heavyweight champion (also The Ultimate Fighter 19 light heavyweight winner) Corey Anderson in a trilogy bout. The pairing first met at Bellator 277, which the bout ended by no-contest in round two due to accidental clash of heads rendered Nemkov unable to continue. Their second meeting took place at Bellator 288, which Nemkov defended the title and won the tournament by unanimous decision. In turn, on December 15, Anderson stated that the fight was off because he is "too tough of a fight" for Nemkov. Nemkov faced Timothy Johnson instead.

Khasan Magomedsharipov and Nathan Kelly were scheduled to meet in a featherweight bout. However, Magomedsharipov withdrew for unknown reasons and was replaced by Akhmed Magomedov.

On the fight week, Jarrah Al-Silawi and Yakub Sulimanov were scheduled to meet in a welterweight bout, but the bout was cancelled for unknown reasons.

At the weigh-ins, Kenny Mokhonoana and Ahmed Sami missed weight. Mokhonoana came in at 147 pounds, one pound over the featherweight fight limit and Sami came in at 199.6 pounds, 0.6 lb over the 199 pounds limit. Their bouts proceeded at catchweight with Mokhonoana and Sami both fined a percent of their purse which went to their opponents Ibragim Ibragimov and Tarek Suleiman respectively.

== Results ==
Fight card (MAX / DAZN)
Weight class				Method	Round	Time	Notes
Lightweight	Usman Nurmagomedov (c)	def.	Paul Hughes	Decision (majority) (47–47, 48–46, 48–46)	5	5:00	(Note: For the Bellator Lightweight World Championship. Nurmagomedov was deducted 1 point in round 3 due to a groin kick.)
Heavyweight	Vadim Nemkov	def.	Timothy Johnson	Submission (rear-naked choke)	1	3:08
Featherweight	Akhmed Magomedov	def.	Nathan Kelly	Submission (rear-naked choke)	2	4:22
Featherweight	Ibragim Ibragimov	def.	Kenny Mokhonoana	Decision (unanimous) (30–27, 30–27, 30–27)	3	5:00	(Note: Mokhonoana missed weight (147 lb).)
Bantamweight	Renat Khavalov	def.	Cleiver Fernandes	Decision (unanimous) (30–27, 29–28, 29–28)	3	5:00
Preliminary card (MAX / DAZN)
Catchweight (199 lb)	Ahmed Sami	def.	Tarek Suleiman	TKO (retirement)	1	5:00	(Note: Sami missed weight (199.6 lb).)
Lightweight	Mirafzal Akhtamov	def.	Mike Thompson	Technical Submission (arm-triangle choke)	2	2:50
Flyweight	Hadi Omar Al Hussaini	def.	Ruel Pañales	Decision (unanimous) (30–27, 29–28, 30–27)	3	5:00
Lightweight	John Mitchell	def.	Souhil Tahïri	Decision (unanimous) (30–27, 30–27, 30–27)	3	5:00
Middleweight	Haider Khan	def.	Mostafa Rashed Nada	TKO (arm injury)	1	3:18
Amateur bouts
Featherweight	Talal AlQallaf	def.	Saeed AlHosani	Decision (unanimous) (29–27, 29–28, 30–27)	3	3:00

== See also ==
- 2025 in Professional Fighters League
- List of PFL events
- List of current PFL fighters
