= Shamil Musaev (fighter) =

Russian mixed martial artist

- Born: 8 January 1994 (age 32); Kizlyar, Dagestan, Russia
- Nickname: The Silent Assassin
- Height: 5 ft 10 in (178 cm)
- Weight: 170 lb (77 kg; 12 st 2 lb)
- Division: Lightweight (2014–2019); Welterweight (2013–present)
- Reach: 72 in (183 cm)
- Style: Wushu Sanda
- Stance: Orthodox
- Fighting out of: Mytishchi, Moscow Oblast, Russia
- Team: Golden Team (MMA Team); SC Akhmatov (Wushu Sanda Team)
- Trainer: Achalo Magomedaminov (Wushu Sanda Coach); Vladimir Hosiya (Head MMA Coach)
- Rank: International Master of Sport in Wushu Sanda; International Master of Sport in Amateur MMA
- Years active: 2013–present

Mixed martial arts record
- Total: 20
- Wins: 18
- By knockout: 12
- By submission: 2
- By decision: 4
- Losses: 1
- By decision: 1
- Draws: 1

Other information
- University: Russian University of Cooperation
- Mixed martial arts record from Sherdog

Shamil Musaev (Russian: Шамиль Мусаевич Мусаев; born 8 January 1994) is a Russian mixed martial artist, who currently fights in the Welterweight division of the Professional Fighters League. He was the 2024 PFL Welterweight Tournament Champion. As of January 27, 2026, he is #1 in the PFL welterweight rankings and as of April 21, 2026, he is #9 in the PFL men's pound-for-pound rankings. He is European MMA champion (2016) and world MMA champion (2017) while serving as a member of the Russian national team during these tournaments. He is also the youngest-ever winner of season four of the series "Mix Fighters".

Musaev also won the tournament "Battle of Champions - 14: School vs School", defeating Muay Thai World Champion Ali Aliev in the final under modified MMA rules. In Wushu Sanda, he is a two-time Senior European champion and a one-time Junior World champion.

== Background ==
Musaev was born on 8 January 1994, in the fortress town of Kizlyar, in the Republic of Dagestan, Russia. As a six years old, he began to dabble himself in the modern Chinese martial art of Wushu Sanda. Musaev was mentored in this sports by coach Achalo Magomedovich Magomedaminov, who is "Honored Worker of Physical Culture and Sports of the Republic of Dagestan" & "Honored Trainer of the Russian Federation in Wushu Sanda". Achalo Magomedaminov himself, trained ten World champions, twenty European champions and other medalist in the combat sports of Wushu Sanda in 2017. Musaev was drafted into "Akhmatov Sports Club" (SC Akhmatov) which is part of "Sports School of the Olympic Reserve Kizlyar" in their Wushu Sanda program. The "Akhmatov Sports Club" is named after the local businessman Ibragim Magomedovich Akhmatov, who is General Director of OJSC (Concern KEMZ), as he donated money for SC Akhmatov, and also sponsored students who participate in combat sports events (Wushu Sanda, wrestling, ARB, Sambo, Muay Thai, Taekwondo, Judo, Boxing and Kickboxing) at regional, national and international levels. The "Sports School of the Olympic Reserve Kizlyar" current director is Achalo Magomedaminov, who succeeded previous director, Gusein Gadzhimuradovich Magomedov, after his retirement.

Musaev studied in shkolu № 7 (School Number 7), which is part of Sports School of the Olympic Reserve, in his home town of Kizlyar, from which he graduated in 2008.

== Wushu Sanda and amateur mixed martial arts career ==
On 9 September 2012, Shamil Musaev became the champion of Russia in Wushu Sanda in Moscow, Russia at 70 kg category for SC Akhmatov. His teammate Shamil Ramazanov won gold at 75 kg. This qualified them for the Wushu Sanda World Championship in Macau, China, held from September 19 to 25. To prepare, they trained at a camp near Izberbash.

A few weeks later, Musaev won the Junior World Championship in Macau in the 70 kg division. Russia won 4 gold, 5 silver, and 3 bronze medals overall.

On 27 March 2014, Musaev won gold at 85 kg in the Russian Wushu Sanda Championship in Moscow. His SC Akhmatov teammates took several other golds. The Dagestan team dominated, winning 8 of 11 categories, finishing ahead of Central Federal District and Yakutia.

In May 2015, Musaev (80 kg) and Ali Abdulkhalikov (75 kg) won gold in Vladimir, joining elite names like Muslim Salikhov. However, Salikhov replaced Musaev in the team sent to the World Championship in Jakarta.

On 7 February 2016, Musaev (80 kg) won gold at the Dagestan Wushu Sanda Championship in Izberbash. His teammates Ali Abdulkhalikov, Magomed Abdulkhalikov, and Rasul Omarov also claimed top spots. Bozigit Ataev won at 90 kg+.

On 20 May 2016, Musaev won gold at the European Wushu Sanda Championship in Moscow. Dagestan fighters secured 18 golds out of 27 categories.

A week later, on 27 May Musaev won bronze at the Russian Amateur MMA Championship, qualifying for the WMMAA European Championship.

On 21 October 2016, Musaev won gold at the WMMAA European Championship in Saint Petersburg, defeating Michael Ovsjannikov in the final. He was later awarded the title "International Master of Sports in Amateur MMA".

On 11 May 2017, Musaev earned bronze at the Russian Amateur MMA Championship in Rostov-on-Don. Magomed Magomedkerimov won the category.

In October, Musaev replaced Magomedkerimov and won gold at the WMMAA World Championship in Astana.

In March 2021, Musaev won his sixth Russian Wushu Sanda Championship in Moscow.

On 2 December 2022, Musaev competed in the "Battle of Champions 14: School vs. School" at Luzhniki Palace of Sports, Moscow, organized by the Russian Union of Martial Arts (RSBI). Eight fighters from eight martial arts schools (wushu sanda, sambo, Muay Thai, kudo, grappling, etc.) competed under modified MMA rules. Rules included three rounds of three minutes each, strikes to all MMA-sanctioned zones, throws, 20-second ground time, chokes and leg locks allowed, but no ground-and-pound. Participants included David Hasanyan (ARB), Vladimir Ivanov (Karate), Shamidkhan Magomedov (Grappling), Victor Samarkin (Kudo), Movsar Baimakhanov (Hand-to-Hand), Ivan Lozhkin (Sambo), Ali Aliev (Muay Thai), and Musaev (Wushu Sanda). In the final, Musaev fought Ali Aliev (both 80 kg). Musaev used wrestling to control the match, despite suffering a broken nose. Judges awarded him a unanimous decision win. He received a championship belt, certificate, and 3 million rubles. Musaev was greeted by teammates and fans at Makhachkala airport.

== Mixed martial arts career ==
=== Early career ===
Musaev made his professional MMA debut in 2013, defeating Muslim Mubarakshoev via TKO (doctor stoppage) in the first round at a regional event in Russia. After three straight wins, he joined M-1 Global in 2014.

That same year, Musaev entered the fourth season of “Mix Fighter,” an MMA reality show modeled after “The Ultimate Fighter,” featuring fighters from 14 countries. After qualifying bouts, he joined “Team Mix Fighter,” mentored by Kenny Garner, while “Team World” was led by Alexey Kudin.

The finals were held in Minsk-Arena before 16,000 spectators and broadcast on the Boyets TV network. Musaev went undefeated, winning 4 fights and becoming the youngest champion in the show’s history. He thanked his coach Achalo Magomedaminov, former school director Gusein Magomedov, and SC Akhmatov founder Ibragim Akhmatov in his post-fight speech.

After winning Mix Fighter, Musaev continued to compete in various Russian promotions, gaining a reputation for his striking and wrestling prowess.

=== Konfrontacja Sztuk Walki (KSW) ===
In 2019, Musaev signed with European promotion KSW. He debuted at KSW 48 on April 27, defeating former TFL lightweight champion Hubert Szymajda via TKO from a crucifix position.

On 7 December 2019, at KSW 52, he knocked out Grzegorz Szulakowski with a spinning backfist.

In 2020, Musaev was set to face champion Mateusz Gamrot for the KSW lightweight belt at KSW 54, but pulled out due to a knee injury.

He returned at KSW 58 in January 2021, defeating undefeated Slovenian Uroš Juricic via unanimous decision. A brawl broke out post-fight, leading to fines—Musaev lost 50% of his purse, later donated to children’s medical causes.

In October 2021 at KSW 64, Musaev fought to a majority draw with Michał Pietrzak. A rematch was scheduled for KSW 68, but cancelled after the promotion terminated contracts with Russian fighters due to the invasion of Ukraine.

=== Russian Cagefighting Championship (RCC) ===
Following a two-year layoff due to KSW contract cancellation, Musaev returned to action at RCC 16 on 28 July 2023, facing former M-1 Global champion Alexey Kunchenko in Tyumen, Russia. Musaev won by TKO in under 90 seconds via spinning back kick and punches.

After the bout, Kunchenko announced his retirement. Musaev expressed regret, stating he wished Kunchenko had won a final fight before retiring.

=== Professional Fighters League (PFL) ===
On 11 March 2024, Musaev joined the PFL’s $1 million welterweight tournament. In his debut at PFL 3 on April 19 in Chicago, he knocked out Logan Storley in the second round.

On 28 June at PFL 6 in Sioux Falls, Musaev fought Murad Ramazanov, whom he had lost to in a 2016 amateur bout. This time, Musaev won via TKO in the second round.

In the semifinals at PFL 9 on 23 August, Musaev faced Ramazanov in a rematch, winning via unanimous decision.

On 29 November 2024, Musaev defeated Magomed Umalatov via third-round TKO in the finals at PFL 10 in Riyadh, Saudi Arabia, claiming the 2024 PFL Welterweight Tournament Championship and the $1 million prize.

Musaev faced Bellator Welterweight Champion Ramazan Kuramagomedov for the inaugural PFL Welterweight Championship on 7 February 2026, at PFL Champions Series 5. He lost the bout via unanimous decision.

Musaev was scheduled to face Thad Jean for the vacant PFL Welterweight Championship on 25 July 2026, at PFL Washington DC. However, two days before the event, Musaev withdrew from the bout due to weight cut complications and was replaced by Ernesto Rodriguez.

== Personal life ==
Musaev is an Avar born in Kizlyar, Dagestan. Some sources incorrectly list his birthplace as Mytishchi, due to his later residence and training there.

He earned the nickname "Cichy Zabójca" ("Silent Assassin") from Polish fans after his KSW debut and is similarly known as "Besshumnyy Ubiytsa" in Russia due to his calm demeanor.

Musaev is represented by Ivan Dijaković of Germany's UFD Gym. He is close with UFC fighter Abus Magomedov, who also corners him during fights.

Musaev trains at Golden Team in Mytishchi, alongside fighters like Magomed Ismailov and Anatoly Malykhin. The gym was founded by Vladimir Hosiya, a former national team coach and Honored Coach of Russia.

He holds the titles of "International Master of Sports" in both Wushu Sanda and Amateur MMA. He is also a "Candidate for Master of Sports" in freestyle wrestling and combat sambo.

== Championships and accomplishments ==
=== Wushu sanda ===
(gold) 1x Junior World Championship of Wushu Sanda

(gold) 2x European Championship of Wushu Sanda

(gold) 6x All-Russian Championship of Wushu Sanda

=== Amateur mixed martial arts ===
1X WMMAA European Championship

1X WMMAA World Championship

=== Professional mixed martial arts ===
- Professional Fighters League
  - 2024 PFL Welterweight Tournament winner

1X Mix Fighter: Welterweight Tournament

- MMA Fighting
  - 2024 Third Team MMA All-Star

=== The Russian Union of Martial Arts (RSBI) ===
1X Battle of Champions 14; School Vs School

== Mixed martial arts record ==
Professional record breakdown
20 matches	18 wins	1 loss
By knockout	12	0
By submission	2	0
By decision	4	1
Draws	1	

Res.	Record	Opponent	Method	Event	Date	Round	Time	Location	Notes
Loss	18–1–1	Ramazan Kuramagomedov	Decision (unanimous)	PFL Dubai: Nurmagomedov vs. Davis	7 February 2026	5	5:00	Dubai, United Arab Emirates	For the inaugural PFL Welterweight Championship. Musaev was deducted one point in round 4 due to an illegal knee.
Win	18–0–1	Magomed Umalatov	TKO (punches)	PFL 10 (2024)	29 November 2024	3	1:44	Riyadh, Saudi Arabia	Won the 2024 PFL Welterweight Tournament.
Win	17–0–1	Murad Ramazanov	Decision (unanimous)	PFL 9 (2024)	23 August 2024	3	5:00	Washington, D.C., United States	2024 PFL Welterweight Tournament Semifinal.
Win	16–0–1	Murad Ramazanov	TKO (punches)	PFL 6 (2024)	28 June 2024	2	1:51	Sioux Falls, South Dakota, United States	
Win	15–0–1	Logan Storley	KO (punches)	PFL 3 (2024)	19 April 2024	2	0:27	Chicago, Illinois, United States	
Win	14–0–1	Alexey Kunchenko	TKO (spinning back kick and punches)	RCC 16	28 July 2023	1	1:26	Tyumen, Russia	
Draw	13–0–1	Michał Pietrzak	Draw (majority)	KSW 64	23 October 2022	3	5:00	Łódź, Poland	
Win	13–0	Uroš Jurišić	Decision (unanimous)	KSW 58	30 January 2021	3	5:00	Łódź, Poland	Return to Welterweight. Fight of the Night.
Win	12–0	Grzegorz Szulakowski	KO (spinning backfist)	KSW 52	7 December 2019	1	1:17	Gliwice, Poland	
Win	11–0	Hubert Szymajda	TKO (punches)	KSW 48	27 April 2019	1	3:52	Lubin, Poland	Return to Lightweight.
Win	10–0	Marat Khasanov	TKO (punches)	Fight Nights Global 91	27 December 2018	1	3:08	Moscow, Russia	
Win	9–0	Miller da Silva Couto	Submission (rear-naked choke)	Golden Team Championship 3	10 March 2018	2	2:52	Lyubertsy, Russia	Return to Welterweight.
Win	8–0	Rasul Samadov	KO (head kick)	Golden Team Tournament: Mytishchi Arena Cup	20 May 2017	1	2:47	Mytishchi, Russia	
Win	7–0	Gergo Bodis	Submission (rear-naked choke)	FighteRevolution Cup 2016	12 August 2016	1	2:24	Kaliningrad, Russia	Welterweight bout.
Win	6–0	Mirlan Amilbekov	TKO (punches)	ProSport: Grand Prix Russia Open 19	5 March 2016	2	1:26	Moscow, Russia	Lightweight debut.
Win	5–0	Felipe Nsue	KO (punch)	Russian MMA Union: New Horizons Grand Final	22 November 2014	1	1:12	Minsk, Belarus	
Win	4–0	Roman Mironenko	Decision (unanimous)	M-1 Global: MixFighter Season 4	15 June 2014	2	5:00	Minsk, Belarus	
Win	3–0	Paval Masalski	TKO (punches)	Mix Fighter: New Horizons Qualifying	27 May 2014	2	2:30	Minsk, Belarus	
Win	2–0	Ravil Gadzhiev	Decision (unanimous)	Real Steel FC 1	14 September 2013	2	5:00	Dubna, Russia	
Win	1–0	Muslim Mubarakshoev	TKO (doctor stoppage)	Razdolie Cup 2013	30 June 2013	1	4:45	Zelenograd, Russia	Welterweight debut.
