= Timur Khizriev =

Russian professional mixed martial artist and Sanda artist

- Born: Timur Shamilovich Khizriev; November 19, 1995 (age 30); Makhachkala, Republic of Dagestan, Russia
- Nickname: Imam (English); Имам (Russian)
- Height: 5 ft 8 in (1.73 m)
- Weight: 145 lb (66 kg; 10 st 5 lb)
- Division: Featherweight
- Reach: 69 in (175 cm)
- Stance: Orthodox
- Fighting out of: Makhachkala, Republic of Dagestan, Russia; Coconut Creek, Florida, U.S.
- Team: DagFighter (present); Jackson Wink MMA Academy (past); Kill Cliff FC (past); American Top Team (present)
- Years active: 2014–present

Mixed martial arts record
- Total: 18
- Wins: 18
- By knockout: 3
- By submission: 1
- By decision: 14
- Losses: 0

Other information
- Mixed martial arts record from Sherdog

Timur Shamilovich Khizriev (Russian: Тимур Шамилович Хизриев; born November 19, 1995) is a Russian professional mixed martial artist and Sanda artist who currently competes in the Featherweight division of the Professional Fighters League (PFL). He previously fought at major MMA promotions like Bellator MMA, Fight Nights Global, Eagle Fighting Championship and Absolute Championship Berkut (ACB). Timur won the redoubtable ACB's Featherweight Grand Prix, defeating his Kavkaz compatriot of Circassian origin, Bibert Tumenov for the title, on March 22, 2019. As of August 21, 2026, he is #2 in the PFL featherweight rankings.

On April 1, 2025, Timur was ranked #10 in World Featherweight rankings according to the Fight Matrix website.

== Background ==
Timur was born on November 19, 1995 to a Dargin family in the state capital city of Makhachkala, Dagestan, Russia. Timur Khizriev or "Imam" as he is colloquially known, began his martial arts journey via freestyle wrestling at the age of nine years under the guidance of late coach Konstantin Kamilovich at Wrestling club in Makhachkala. Under Konstantin Kamilovich coaching, than undersized Timur, who weighed 64 kg back than, snagged gold in freestyle wrestling at Dagestan Championship in 71 kg weight category.

Timur than began to combine his freestyle wrestling pursuit with Wushu Sanda. At Wushu Sanda he came under the tutelage of first ever USSR Karate Champion (1981) and Champion of Russia in Wushu-Sanda, Rasul Dzhalakovich Chotanov who acted as his (Timur) first ever coach in striking art. Chotanov played fundamental role in establishing the foundation for Timur's striking technique.

Rasul Dzhalakovich Chotanov learned Karate and Wushu Sanda from martial arts coach Gusein Magomaev, founder of Five Directions of the World and sensei of combat athletes Zabit Magomedsharipov, Muslim Salikhov, and Magomed Magomedov.

Timur was juggling his priorities between freestyle wrestling and Wushu Sanda, he eventually decided to fully commit on his wrestling career alone. This did not last long, as Timur finally decided to devote himself to the world of MMA fully, as a teenager (18 years old).

Timur first joined page-oner MMA gym DagFighter, after winning silver medal at amateur MMA championship held in his native state of Dagestan. His first coach at DagFighter gym was Jamal Magomedov. Eventually, he was trained in the combat sports of MMA by DagFighter head coach Mansur Uchakaev.

Mansur Uchakaev himself was a world champion in Combat Sambo, who was trained in the sports (combat sambo) by Khabib's father Abdulmanap Nurmagomedov. Masur is the younger brother of late Muslim Ibragimovich Uchakaev. Muslim Uchakaev himself was decorated combat sportsman, as he was world champion in combat sambo and Eurasian champion in Army Hand-to-Hand Combat. Like his younger brother Mansur, Muslim Uchakaev was also student of Abdulmanap Nurmagomedov.

This positions Timur among the combat athletes who have a notable indirect connection to resplendent martial art coaches like Abdulmanap Nurmagomedov and Gusein Magomaev.

== Mixed martial arts career ==
=== Early career ===
Khizriev began his pro MMA career on August 30, 2014; at the young of 18 years old, where he defeated his fellow countryman, Roman Kishev at the Severo-Kavkazsky Federal Okrug - SKFO-Championships. In that same year, he fought in the CSDF League, after which he took a hiatus from pro MMA scene for a little over two years.

=== Amateur MMA ===
On March 22, 2015, Timur earned bronze medal as he lost to fellow Dagestani fighter Gamzat Saidbekov in the semifinals of MMA Cup Of Dagestan. However literally two months later on May 5, Timur managed to snag at Ural Amateur MMA Championship, by defeating his comrade Dilovar Chuponov in the finals, held in the halls of Ural Federal University, in the city of Yekaterinburg, Sverdlovsk Oblast.

Five months later of the same year, on October 31, Timur was scheduled to face off against future top ranked UFC Lightweight fighter Arman Tsarukyan at Russian MMA Championship, in the city of Obninsk, Kaluga Oblast. Timur lost the fight against Tsarukyan in the semifinal. Tsarukyan himself got entirely out-fought against future WMMAA European champion Musa Kazikhanov in the finals where he lost against Kazikhanov via uncontested unanimous decision.

On April 3, 2016, Timur was silver medalist at Ural MMA Championship where he lost out to Russian fighter of Tajik origin Davlatmand Chuponov, in the final held at halls of Yunost Sport Palace stadium in the city of Chelyabinsk, Chelyabinsk Oblast. At Amateur MMA Cup Of Russia, Timur was bronze medalist as he lost in the semifinal against his countryman Ivan Bondarchuk held in town of Kasimov, Ryazan Oblast.

=== Return to Pro MMA ===
Timur finally returned to pro MMA circuit at Superstar Fight 5: Meng vs. Khabibullaeva event at Beijing University Students' Gymnasium, Beijing, China, on September 23, 2016. Exactly a year later on September 4, 2017, he participated in a Fight Nights Global tournament.

However, Khizriev had the opportunity fight to under the banner of Mairbek Khasiev's MMA organization ACB in 2019, whom he fought for four times. He also took part in ACB's Grand Prix at featherweight division, where he beat Chechen grappler Yusup-Khadzhi Zubariev in semi-final. To top it off for his time at ACB, he manage to win the Grand Prix title, after defeating adroit Circassian talent, Bibert Tumenov, in the final.

Khizriev second-last fight in local Russian MMA scene came against Alexander Belikh whom he defeated via unanimous decision. His final fight in Russian MMA circuit came against Kyrgyz brawler, Ruslan Ryskul, whom the Imam finished off Ryskul via guillotine choke in the first round of the fight. After this, Timur signed for paramount combat promotion, Bellator MMA.

=== Bellator MMA ===
On November 18, 2022, Khizriev made his debut for premiere combat promotion Bellator MMA, by replacing his comrade Akhmed Magomedov, against German legend Daniel Weichel, who was ranked 5th at the time, in the main card of Bellator 288: Nemkov vs. Anderson 2 at Wintrust Arena, Chicago, Illinois, United States. Timur defeated the Deutsch fighter Weichel via unanimous decision in all three judges scorecard.

In his second fight for Bellator MMA, he was scheduled to face off against Irish BJJ black belt, Richie Smullen on June 16, 2023, at Postliminary card of Bellator 297: Nemkov vs. Romero. He defeated the Irish grappler Smullen via 30-27 unanimous decision.

On November 17, 2023, Timur had the opportunity to fight in last ever Bellator event under Viacom's management, against the American Justin Gonzales on the prelims of Bellator 301: Amosov vs. Jackson card at Wintrust Arena, in the city of Chicago, Illinois. The Imam defeated the J-Train Gonzales via dominating 30-27 unanimous decision in all three judges scorecard.

=== Professional Fighters League (PFL) ===
On April 19, 2024, Timur made his debut for major MMA promotion PFL against Brett Johns of Wales on the prelims of PFL 3: Koreshkov vs. Umalatov card at Wintrust Arena, in the city of Chicago, Illinois, United States. He defeated Johns via unanimous decision in a vying battle.

On 28 June 2024 Timur was booked to fight against Peruvian veteran, Enrique Barzola on PFL 6: Loughnane vs. Gonzales card, on Sanford Pentagon Stadium, in the city of Sioux Falls, South Dakota, United States. He defeated the Peruvian martial artist Barzola via unanimous decision.

On August 23, 2024, Timur was scheduled to fight against Brazilian fighter with Muay Thai background Gabriel Braga at The Anthem stadium in Washington D.C., United States. He won the fight via split decision with 30-27 (Timur), 28-29 (Braga), 30-27 (Timur) score line.

In the final, Khizriev faced Brendan Loughnane on November 29, 2024, at PFL 10. He won the tournament and $1 million prize by unanimous decision.

Khizriev faced Gabriel Braga in a rematch on October 16, 2026, at PFL Chicago 2. He won the fight via split decision.

== Personal life ==
Timur is a devout Muslim. He was even fasting during the Islamic month of Ramazan, despite the fact he was scheduled to battle against the Welsh grappler, Brett Johns on PFL 3: Koreshkov vs. Umalatov card.

Timur is a natural bantamweight. He only came on as a substitute in the BYE's Grand Prix, and remained in the featherweight division. After the grand prix he originally planned to fight in the bantamweight division which did not come to fruition.

Timur is feted friends with fighter Saygid Abdulaev, who currently competes in Flyweight division of Europe paramount MMA promotion Absolute Championship Akhmat (ACA).

Timur grew up as a fan of mixed martial arts as he watched now defunct Pride Fighting Championships in television in Russia. He is a fan of MMA because it an amalgamation of Muay Thai, wrestling, grappling & boxing etc.

Timur is the younger brother of UFC's middleweight prospect Aliaskhab Khizriev; who currently like his younger brother Timur has unbeaten record of 14-0. Both him and elder brother are part of conspicuous MMA gym ATT at Coconut Creek, Florida.

He also has a younger brother Gamid Shamilovich Khizriev who has fought in MMA promotion, Fight Nights Global (FNG) of Russia. Gamid who himself is team member of DagFighter has earned two bronze medals in Soyuz MMA (2020 at lightweight; 2022 at welterweight) and one gold at Moscow Pankration Tournament.

Before joining ATT, Timur was initially part of paramount gym Jackon Wink MMA Academy, where he had the opportunity to train with MMA veterans like Jon Jones there. Before Khizriev debut for Bellator, he also trained at page-oner MMA gym, Kill Cliff FC under the leadership of Henri Hooft.

Back at Dagestan he is part of the gym DagFighter where he is teammates with martial artist Zabit Magomedsharipov. His main coaches at DagFighter gym are Timur Valiev and Mansur Uchakaev.

Even in Timur's homeplace of Dagestan, he hops from one gym to another. He occasionally visits another gym to wrestle and spar with various fighters. He also travels to the Dagestani town of Khasavyurt in order to be coached by Aslan Mamedov, and to improve his Muay Thai skills.

He also trained with momentous MMA fighters like Magomed Magomedov of Dagestan and Salman Zhamaldaev of Chechnya in the past.

During Timur MMA bouts, he is usually cornered in the cage by Jamal Magomedov (his first coach at DagFighter), Timur Valiev (head coach), Mansur Uchakaev (head coach) & Magomedrasul Zubairov.

Timur considers weight cutting hardest part in the sports of MMA. He usually weighs around 73–74 kg during off-season. He must cut 7–8 kg to make weight during fight week.

Timur spends his free time with friends and enjoys visiting the sea during the summer. Additionally, he frequently spends time in the gym, engaging in light workouts, which he also considers a form of relaxation and vacation. He enjoys long walks in the sea and swimming on the beach.

Timur role models are in the sports are Jamal Magomedov, Imanali Gamzathanov, Timur Valiev, Magomed Magomedov, Zabit Magomedsharipov, Magomed Mustafaev & Rustam Khabilov.

However he closely follows the career of Khabib Nurmagomedov, Islam Makhachev, and Rashid Magomedov, all of whom are regarded not only as accomplished athletes but also as exemplary individuals, a quality that he believes is increasingly rare in contemporary times.

Timur Shamilovich Khizriev nickname is Imam. The origin of this nickname Imam perchance be a nod to the venerable Northeast Caucasian resistance leader, Imam Shamil. Timur began using 'Imam' as his nickname for MMA bouts because his patronymic name, Shamilovich, is derived from Imam Shamil’s name. The root of Timur's patronymic, 'Shamil,' connects him to Imam Shamil.

Besides Sanda and freestyle wrestling, Timur has also trained in other martial art disciplines like ARB, boxing & combat sambo. In fact he participated up to 80 battles as an amateur in the field of combat sambo alone.

Early into Timur's combat sports career, he often found himself in street fights, which occurred more frequently than his official amateur and professional MMA matches. Despite this, he does not support street fighting, particularly for professional fighters as he believes that combat skills should be confined to the gym and official competitions; & should only be reserved for extreme situations where it's necessary to defend oneself or protect loved ones.

=== Makhachkala shooting ===
On the evening of July 15, 2025, Khizriev was hospitalized with non-life-threatening injuries after being shot five times by two masked attackers in Makhachkala. The motives of the attack are unknown.

== Championships and achievements ==
=== Wushu Sanda ===
- Gold 2x All-Russian Championship of Wushu Sanda.

=== Mixed martial arts ===
==== Amateur MMA ====
- Bronze 2015 MMA Cup of Dagestan Featherweight Championship, Kaspiysk (−65.8 kg)
- Gold 2015 Ural Amateur MMA Featherweight Championship, Yekaterinburg (−65.8 kg)
- Bronze 2015 Russian MMA Featherweight Championship, Obninsk (−65.8 kg)
- Silver 2016 Ural MMA Featherweight Championship, Chelyabinsk (−65.8 kg)
- Bronze 2016 Amateur MMA Cup of Russia Featherweight Championship, Kasimov (−65.8 kg)

==== Pro MMA ====
- Professional Fighters League
  - 2024 PFL Featherweight Championship
- Absolute Championship Berkut: Young Eagles
  - 2019 BYE Featherweight World Grand Prix Tournament Winner, Grozny (−65.8 kg)

== Mixed martial arts record ==
Professional record breakdown
19 matches	19 wins	0 losses
By knockout	3	0
By submission	1	0
By decision	15	0

Res.	Record	Opponent	Method	Event	Date	Round	Time	Location	Notes
Win	19–0	Gabriel Braga	Decision (split)	PFL Chicago: Carmouche vs. Bishop 2	October 16, 2026	3	5:00	Chicago, Illinois, United States	
Win	18–0	Brendan Loughnane	Decision (unanimous)	PFL 10 (2024)	November 29, 2024	5	5:00	Riyadh, Saudi Arabia	Won the 2024 PFL Featherweight Tournament.
Win	17–0	Gabriel Alves Braga	Decision (split)	PFL 9 (2024)	August 23, 2024	3	5:00	Washington, D.C., United States	2024 PFL Featherweight Tournament Semifinal.
Win	16–0	Enrique Barzola	Decision (unanimous)	PFL 6 (2024)	June 28, 2024	3	5:00	Sioux Falls, South Dakota, United States	
Win	15–0	Brett Johns	Decision (unanimous)	PFL 3 (2024)	April 19, 2024	3	5:00	Chicago, Illinois, United States	
Win	14–0	Justin Gonzales	Decision (unanimous)	Bellator 301	November 17, 2023	3	5:00	Chicago, Illinois, United States	
Win	13–0	Richie Smullen	Decision (unanimous)	Bellator 297	June 16, 2023	3	5:00	Chicago, Illinois, United States	
Win	12–0	Daniel Weichel	Decision (unanimous)	Bellator 288	November 18, 2022	3	5:00	Chicago, Illinois, United States	
Win	11–0	Ruslan Ryskul	Technical Submission (guillotine choke)	AMC Fight Nights: Abdulmanap Nurmagomedov Memory Tournament	September 17, 2021	1	3:06	Moscow, Russia	Catchweight (149 lb) bout.
Win	10–0	Alexander Belikh	Decision (unanimous)	AMC Fight Nights 99	December 25, 2020	3	5:00	Moscow, Russia	
Win	9–0	Baish Babakulov	TKO (punches)	Gorilla Fighting 27	August 22, 2020	1	2:55	Almetyevsk, Russia	Catchweight (150 lb) bout.
Win	8–0	Bibert Tumenov	Decision (unanimous)	Berkut Young Eagles 8	March 23, 2019	5	5:00	Grozny, Russia	Won the 2018 BYE Featherweight Grand Prix.
Win	7–0	Yusup-Khadzhi Zubariev	Decision (unanimous)	Berkut Young Eagles 7	December 22, 2018	3	5:00	Tolstoy-Yurt, Russia	2018 BYE Featherweight Grand Prix Semifinal.
Win	6–0	Musa Visengeriev	Decision (unanimous)	Berkut Young Eagles 5	October 13, 2018	3	5:00	Tolstoy-Yurt, Russia	Return to Featherweight. 2018 BYE Featherweight Grand Prix Quarterfinal.
Win	5–0	Maxim Pugachev	Decision (unanimous)	Berkut Young Eagles 2	April 15, 2018	3	5:00	Tolstoy-Yurt, Russia	Lightweight debut.
Win	4–0	Martiros Grigoryan	TKO (head kick and punches)	Fight Nights Global 73	September 4, 2017	1	2:09	Kaspiysk, Russia	
Win	3–0	Li Bolin	Decision (unanimous)	Superstar Fight 5	September 23, 2016	3	5:00	Beijing, China	Catchweight (150 lb) bout.
Win	2–0	Zaur Asukov	TKO (punches)	Combat Self Defense Federation 1	September 12, 2014	1	4:56	Pyatigorsk, Russia	
Win	1–0	Roman Kishev	Decision (unanimous)	Severo-Kavkazsky Federal Okrug Championships	August 30, 2014	2	5:00	Pyatigorsk, Russia	Featherweight debut.

== See also ==
- List of current PFL fighters
- List of male mixed martial artists
