= Magomed Umalatov =

Russian mixed martial artist (born 1992)

- Born: Magomed Nasrulayevich Umalatov; April 3, 1992 (age 34); Zenzeli, Russia
- Nickname: The Prince
- Height: 6 ft 1 in (1.85 m)
- Weight: 170 lb (77 kg; 12 st 2 lb)
- Division: Welterweight (2015; 2018-present); Middleweight (2018)
- Reach: 75 in (191 cm)
- Style: Boxing; Combat Sambo; Army Hand-to-Hand Combat
- Stance: Orthodox
- Fighting out of: Astrakhan, Russia; Coconut Creek, Florida, U.S.
- Team: American Top Team; Eagles MMA; Performance MMA; Astrakhan Top Team
- Trainer: Marcos DaMatta (Main Coach at ATT); Anderson Franca (Striking Coach at ATT); Shamil Magomedovich Magomedov; Rustam Umalatov; Dyah Ali Davis (Boxing Coach at ATT)
- Rank: International Master of Sport in Soyuz MMA; Master of Sport in Army Hand-to-Hand Combat; Master of Sport in Combat Sambo
- Years active: 2015–present

Mixed martial arts record
- Total: 19
- Wins: 18
- By knockout: 12
- By submission: 2
- By decision: 4
- Losses: 1
- By knockout: 1

Other information
- Notable relatives: Gasan Umalatov (brother)
- Mixed martial arts record from Sherdog

Magomed Nasrulayevich Umalatov (Russian: Магомед Насрулаевич Умалатов; born April 3, 1992) is a Russian professional mixed martial artist who currently competes in the Welterweight division of the Professional Fighters League (PFL). As of February 12, 2026, he is #3 in the PFL welterweight rankings. He was the winner of the 2018 SMRF Welterweight Grand Prix. Umalatov was previously GFC Welterweight Champion, having won the title on August 30, 2019.

As of August 18, 2024, Umalatov attained #18 in World Welterweight rankings according to Fight Matrix. He is also International Master of Sport in Soyuz MMA, Master of Sport in Hand-to-Hand Combat and Master of Sport in Combat Sambo.

== Background ==
Magomed Umalatov was born on April 3, 1992, in the village of Zenzeli, Limansky district, Astrakhan Oblast, Russia. He grew up in a large Dargin family. He was the youngest among eight brothers and sisters.

Umalatov's first passion was football, which he started playing at the age of 6 and played for twelve years. He was a youth squad member of FC Volgar Astrakhan.

At the age of 18 years old Umalatov decided to shift his focus to MMA. He first started training alone. He first took boxing classes, then hand-to-hand combat classes and finally he trained under his oldest brother Rustam Umalatov.

In Umalatov's MMA career, he is also trained by coach Shamil Magomedovich Magomedov. He currently trains in Performance MMA & Astrakhan Top Team, back in Russia. While in the U.S. he trains at ATT gym, where his main coach is Marcos DaMatta, while his striking and boxing coaches are Anderon Franca and Dyah Ali Davis respectively.

Umalatov is not the only notable athlete in his family, as his older brother Gasan Umalatov also found eminence in top MMA promotions like the UFC and PFL. Gasan himself has a record of 18 wins, 6 losses, and 2 draws as a professional fighter. Besides MMA, Gasan is the 2008 World champion in kick-jitzu, two-time World champion in universal combat (2010 & 2011).

Umalatov's other elder sibling, Islam Umalatov, was a 2-time world champion in grappling. The entire Umalatov family is involved in combat sports, as his brothers and nephews are either excellent strikers or all-rounders in their fighting styles.

Umalatov is commonly referred to as "The Prince" or "Prints" (Принц) in the MMA circle. His older brother Gasan also actively helps him to prepare in his fight camp for his upcoming bouts in MMA.

== Mixed martial arts career ==
=== Early career ===
Umalatov won the Southern Federal District SBE-MMA Championship on April 18, 2015; this was an amateur MMA tourney under the umbrella of Russian MMA Union. He won all of his fight in first round via finish in that tournament.

Umalatov made his professional mixed martial arts debut on May 8 of the same year at the "Battle on the Volga" card, in his hometown Astrakhan, where he defeated his fellow Russian fighter Stanislav Vilchinsky via submission in the first round of the bout within 43 seconds of round number one.

After that fight, Umalatov took a three-year hiatus, as he became fully focused on amateur MMA scene, regional combat sambo tournament and hand-to-hand combat bouts.

=== Amateur fight career ===
On October 25, 2015, Umalatov won silver medal in Russian Cup in SBE-MMA, in the city of Volgograd.

On December 19 of the same year, Umalatov manage won gold in South Federal District Combat Sambo Championship, in the city Russian city of Armavir.

On October 4, 2016, he wins gold at the prestigious "Grand Prix of Cities of Military Glory” in the city of Kolpino. His other elder brother Islam also took part and won gold in 93 kg weight category.

The year of 2017 was a pivotal year in Umalatov MMA career as he won bronze medal at All-Russian MMA Championship in the city of Rostov-on-Don that allowed him to qualify for WMMAA European Championship in the East German city of Dresden.

On December 8 of the same year, Umalatov becomes WMMAA European champion in the city of Dresden. In this tournament Russian team won gold medals in every possible weight category.

After becoming WMMAA European Champion, Umalatov was conferred the title of International Master of Sports in MMA by Russian Sports Ministry on July 24, 2018.

=== Return to pro MMA ===
The "Prince" finally returned to the octagon in mid-2018 where he would compete in eight pro MMA fight in his two years with various Russian promotions, winning each battle solely through his finishing skills. The "Prince" wins in these matches included flying knees, brutal overhand strikes, and beating his opponent until the match was stopped by the cage referee.

=== GFC & EFC Welterweight Champion ===
After string of strong performances all coming with either first round or second round finishes, Umalatov along with experienced Brazilian fighter, Adriano "Lion Man" Balbi, were booked to fight for the Gorilla Fighting Championship's Welterweight strap, on GFC 16 event, at Astrakhan, Russia, in co-main fight. However, Adriano Balbi withdrew from the bout and was promptly replaced by Umalatov's comrade Alexey "Malysh" Novikov of Russia. That fight did not go the distance, as Umalatov TKO'd Novikov within round one of the fight. This was Umalatov 8th pro victory, all coming via early finishes.

Sometime after winning the GFC championship strap, Umalatov along with classical archer Alexander Gazitulin and Russian-Kazakh MMA fighter Serik Razgaliev were invited to as guest speakers to a forum in Astrakhan, where they got into great details about the struggles they faced as professional athletes. During the forum meeting, competitions were also organized, as the participants were given prizes/gift from the hands of the three attending guests.

After winning the GFC's World Welterweight Championship belt, Umalatov original plan was to defend his title on December 13 or 14 of the same year, however he was informed by Gorilla FC management that the entire Welterweight bout was scrapped from their December card. Than he planned to defend his belt on March of the year 2020 at GFC 25 card. That plan was ultimately cancelled as well as Gorilla FC was in talks to be taken over by MMA superstar Khabib Nurmagomedov for one million dollars.

After Gorilla Fighting Championship was rebranded as Eagle Fighting Championship, Umalatov was than scheduled to fight against his comrade Boris Medvedev, as Umalatov's first title defence on December 19, 2020, on EFC card, as co-main fight at Nizhny Novgorod, Russia. However Medvedev withdrew from the title bout and was promptly replaced by a Dagestani brawler Rashid Koichakaev.

Umalatov and Rashid Koichakaev previously met at Wolf Fights - Shvatka 7 Welterweight tournament final, where Umalatov won via TKO in round one of the bout. The fight did not go the distance as Umalatov managed to finish Koichakaev via TKO in round three of the title fight.

This was Umalatov's ninth career finish (8 of them coming via KOs) in his 9 unbeaten pro fight. After his successful title defence, the Russian-Dagestani fighter signs contract with America-based MMA promotion, Professional Fighters League (PFL).

=== Professional Fighters League ===
On May 6, 2021, Umalatov set to make debut for American promotion PFL against the ex Dana White's Contender Series competitor Kyron "Mamba" Bowen, as opening fight in the PFL 3: Werdum vs. Ferreira card. In the first round he took Bowen down and soften him up with a series of hammer fist that allowed Russian-Dagestani fighter to come close to finishing the American who was only saved by the bell. In the round two, Bowen who was still wobbled by the earlier hammer fist in first round goes for telegraphed punch against Umalatov, who immediately responds with slip counter that lead to TKO in 0:07 seconds of the round.

Umalatov second fight was supposed to be booked against the American Micah Terrill on the prelims of PFL 7: Cooper III vs. MacDonald card. However, the PFL management decided shuffle the card and swap Micah Terrill with Brazilian BJJ specialist Leandro Silva, as a replacement fight for Magomed Umalatov on August 13, 2021, at PFL 7. At weigh-ins, Silva weighed in at 172.5 pounds, missing weight by 1.5 pounds. The bout proceeded at catchweight and Silva was fined 20% of his purse, which went to Umalatov. The Russian-Dagestani fighter ultimately won the bout via unanimous decision.

Leandro Silva was first ever fighter who went the entire distance against Umalatov, otherwise all of Umalatov's prior fights ended up in early finishing victories for the Russian-Dagestani fighter.

Magomed Umalatov was scheduled to face future Two-time PFL World Welterweight champion Ray Cooper III on May 6, 2022, at PFL 3. Umalatov would pull out of the bout and ultimately be replaced by former LFA Welterweight Champion Carlos Leal.

For his third fight for PFL organization, Umalatov was booked against the former BRAVE CF World Welterweight champion Jarrah Al Silawi of Jordan on July 1, 2022, on the main card of PFL 6: Harrison vs. Young. The Russian Knocks out the Al Silawi in round one of the fight after hurting his adversary with a short backfist. Thereby giving Umalatov his 11th finish (10 via KO/TKO) in all of his 12 unbeaten pro fights. Both Umalatov and his compatriot Marina Mokhnatkina were booed by the Atlantan crowd.

Umalatov was scheduled to face Former Bellator World Champion Rory MacDonald in the Semifinals of the Welterweight tournament on August 13, 2022, at PFL 8. However, after Umalatov was forced to pull out due to visa issues from United Kingdom government, as he then was replaced by Dilano "The Postman" Taylor for the match. Umalatov's manager Ali-Abdel Aziz branded this step taken by UK government dirty.

On April 14, 2023, Umalatov was set to battle against the last year PFL Welterweight Tournament finalist Dilano "The Postman" Taylor as an opening fight for PFL 3: (2023 season) card. The Russian-Dagestani fighter KO's Taylor in round number of the fight. This was Umalatov 12th finish (11 KO/TKO) in all of his 13 unbeaten pro fights.

On June 23, 2023, Umalatov was scheduled to face off against the Mexican brawler Nayib "Cachorro" Lopez on the main card of PFL 6: Aubin-Mercier vs. Romero card. Lopez himself was strong prospect, who came with 16-0 unbeaten record. In an all-action fight that went the distance Umalatov defeated the Mexican fighter via dominating unanimous decision in the eyes of the judges.

For the semi-final fight, Umalatov was originally scheduled to face his compatriot Magomed Magomedkerimov at PFL 9 on August 23, 2023. However, Umalatov withdrew from the bout and was ultimately replaced by Solomon "The Black Dragon" Renfro of USA.

On March 11, 2024, Umalatov was set star in a headlining fight against his Russian comrade Andrey Koreshkov in PFL 3: Koreshkov vs. Umalatov card Wintrust Arena, in the city Chicago. During the various point of the bout, he came near to finishing off Koreshkov, only for the Siberian fighter to be saved by the bell. The fight ultimately, went all three rounds as the Umalatov defeated his fellow Russian fighter via unanimous decision.

On June 28 of same year, Umalatov faced off against credentialed folkstyle wrestler, Brennan Ward, in the main card of PFL 6 - 2024 Regular Season, Sanford Pentagon stadium, Sioux Falls, South Dakota. He won the fight via an anaconda choke submission in the first round. With this victory, he improved his record with 82% finishing rate; majority of which came from KO/TKO.

Umalatov was scheduled to face Don Madge in the semifinals of the 2024 Welterweight tournament on August 23, 2024, at PFL 9, however Madge pulled out due to injury and was replaced by Neiman Gracie. Umalatov won the fight by unanimous decision.

In the final, Umalatov faced Shamil Musaev on November 29, 2024, at PFL 10. He lost the fight by technical knockout in the third round leading to the first loss in his MMA career.

On February 11, 2025, the promotion officially revealed that Umalatov will join the 2025 PFL Welterweight Tournament. He was scheduled to be facing Logan Storley on April 3, 2025, at PFL 1, however at weigh-ins he came in at 173.6 pounds, 1.6 pounds over the welterweight limit, leading to him being removed from the competition.

Umalatov returned to the tournament in an alternate bout again Anthony Ivy at PFL 5 (2025) on June 12, 2025. He won the fight via knockout in the first round.

Umalatov was scheduled to face Abdoul Abdouraguimov at PFL Dubai: Nurmagomedov vs. Davis on February 7, 2026, However, Umalatov withdrew for unknown reasons and was replaced by Kendly St. Louis.

Umalatov was scheduled to face Ernesto Rodriguez on July 25, 2026, at PFL Washington DC. However, Umalatov withdrew from the event and was replaced by Aaron McKenzie.

== Personal life ==
Due to Umalatov tendency to KO/TKO most of his opponents, he was branded as Artur Beterbiev of MMA by Russian media.

One of his elder sibling Gasan Umalatov, is currently serving as vice-president of the Astrakhan MMA Federation.

Umalatov has 100 fights as an amateur in various combat sports. He has 50 fights in amateur MMA and nearly the same number of battles in hand-to-hand combat tourneys. He also competed in combat sambo tournament as well. He fought 4 different opponents in single day during his amateur fight career.

On March 9, 2016, Umalatov managed to achieve the distinction of being conferred the title of Master of Sports both in Soyuz MMA and Hand-to-Hand Combat by Russian Sports Minister, Vitaly Mutko in the same awarding ceremony. His Master of Sports in Soyuz MMA was later upgraded to International Master of Sports after becoming European Champion in Dresden, Germany.

After winning regional combat sambo tourney, Umalatov was also given the title of Master of Sports in Combat Sambo.

On December 27, 2017, Umalatov and his Eagles MMA gym mates like Raimond Magomedaliev (2-times Wushu Sanda World Champion and Combat Sambo World Champion), Akhmed "Butcher" Aliev, Abusupiyan Alikhanov, Gasan Umalatov (Umalatov's older brother), Ismail Aliev, Aigun Akhmedov, Basyr Abakarov & Magomed Abdurakhimov all partook in charity martial classes classes for the Muscovite children. These fighters also took part in relay races and other children's games with attending Muscovite kids.

Rizvan Magomedov became Umalatov's manager sometime around in 2019.

Just like Khamzat "Borz" Chimaev, Umalatov also lives and sleeps in upper floor of American Top Team gym at Coconut Creek, Florida. Until April 13, 2024, he has been living in ATT for three years, where he is sharing accommodation with 6-10 fellow fighters.

Umalatov doesn't take more than one-week break after his fights. Even during Ramazan, he took two training sessions per day to prepare for Dilano "Postman" Taylor.

During breaks from training, Umalatov relaxes by watching action movies, which he also uses to improve his English. He visits Floridian cinemas and, during this time, eats hearty meat dishes and occasionally drinks Coca-Cola. He also does some sightseeing.

Umalatov's PFL debut can be described as a happy accident. Initially, Umalatov flew to America to serve as a sparring partner and cornerman for his teammate Akhmed "Butcher" Aliev, who was about to compete in the PFL's lightweight tournament. During that time, Umalatov asked his manager Rizvan Magomedov, if there was any spot available for him to compete in the PFL bouts. He was than informed by his manager, that there was virtually no chance at first, as the entire PFL Welterweight lineup was complete where they even had one reserve fighter booked in Welterweight their rooster.

Therefore, Umalatov initially intended to corner his gym colleague Akhmed "Butcher" Aliev. However, the situation quickly changed as both of his compatriot Magomed Magomedkerimov & Alexey "Wolverine" Kunchenko were denied visas. Rizvan Magomedov, the manager of both fighters (Umalatov and Magomedkerimov), asked Umaratov to replace Magomedkerimov on short notice, to which he quickly agreed.

Umalatov was originally not in fight shape when he agreed to substitute in place of his comrade Magomedkerimov. He already weighed 92 kg and was supposed to cutdown to 77 kg in a matter of two weeks. He was already in self-doubt that he could never make that weight. But he only agreed to do it, because it was his one and only chance to fight in US-based promotions, if he missed on this opportunity, he would end up, stuck in Russian MMA scene for the foreseeable future.

In order to prepare for his PFL debut, Umalatov spent three weeks in quarantine. He was only allowed to train inside his hotel room. To get into fight shape, he enlisted the help of his teammate & friend Akhmed "Butcher" Aliev.

Umalatov was still under contract with Eagle Fighting Championship when he made his debut for his PFL on May 6, 2021. He was allowed to do so, as he had stipulation in his contract that he could leave the Eagle FC at any time if got contracted to foreign MMA promotion.

For his first fight for PFL, Umalatov was initially offered one-fight "Temporary employment contract" by management, which would only be extended if he wins that fight against Kyron "Mamba" Bowen.

Umalatov original debut for PFL was supposed to happen way back in 2019, to fight as a substitute. However that didn't happen, as the organization chose to sign an American fighter in his stead, because Umalatov was still performing in Russian MMA circuit. This was because American based fighter take less time adapt than Russian one. However, If a Russian fighter is already present in US soil, PFL organization is more inclined to offer them a fight deal.

Umalatov doesn't have any idols in MMA. Although, he is most motivated by Khabib Nurmagomedov success in the combat sports of MMA. Speaking of Khabib, Umalatov personally likes the Khabib's fighting style. As he feels that Khabib combat prowess best represent all of Russian fighting style.

Umalatov attributes Fedor "The Last Emperor" Emelianenko as the entity who popularized the combat sports of MMA in the entirety of Russian Federation. He considers Emelianenko and Khabib as two of the most paramount MMA athletes to come out of Russia.

Umalatov favorite training partners are Ramazan Kurmagomedov and Johnny Eblen. Training with such high level fighters allows him to push his limits and ultimately improve his performance level. He also trained and sparred Movlid "Killer" Khaybulaev, Nikolai Aleksakhin, Akhmed "Butcher" Aliev & Magomed Magomedkerimov in the past.

After Umalatov's victory over Dilano "Postman" Taylor, he was invited to train and spar with then UFC champion Kamaru Usman.

Umalatov said that he prefers some aspects of American life more than life in Russia or Dagestan, and that his life in Florida is carefree and unbothered. Umalatov also prefers the American public's attitude towards MMA fighters over the Dagestani public's attitude. According to him, most Russian fighters are ignored by the Dagestani public unless they are UFC champions. But in America, people act nicely even towards fighters at non-UFC promotions; asking to take pictures and to talk about previous fights in detail.

== Championship & Achievements ==
=== Combat Sambo ===
(gold) South Federal District Combat Sambo Championship (−82 kg)

=== Hand-to-Hand Combat Championship ===
(gold) Southern Federal District in hand-to-hand combat (−80 kg)

(gold) All-Russian Championship in hand-to-hand combat (−80 kg)

(gold) DOSAAF Cup in hand-to-hand combat, Voronezh (−85 kg).

=== Soyuz MMA ===
(gold) Southern Federal District in Soyuz MMA (−77 kg)

(silver) Russian Cup in Soyuz MMA (−77 kg)

(gold) Grand Prix of Cities of Military Glory (−77 kg)

(bronze) All-Russian MMA Championship (−84 kg)

(gold) WMMAA European Championship (−84 kg)

=== Pro MMA ===
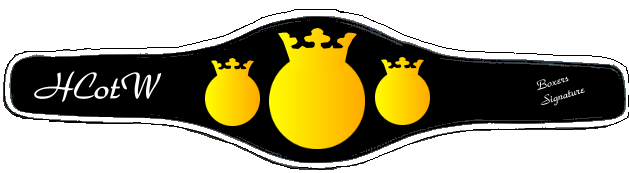
GFC/EFC Welterweight Champion (One title defence)

== Mixed martial arts record ==
Professional record breakdown
19 matches	18 wins	1 loss
By knockout	12	1
By submission	2	0
By decision	4	0

Res.	Record	Opponent	Method	Event	Date	Round	Time	Location	Notes
Win	18–1	Anthony Ivy	KO (punches)	PFL 5 (2025)	June 12, 2025	1	2:28	Nashville, Tennessee, United States	2025 PFL Welterweight Tournament Alternate bout; Ivy missed weight (175.4 lb).
Loss	17–1	Shamil Musaev	TKO (punches)	PFL 10 (2024)	November 29, 2024	3	1:44	Riyadh, Saudi Arabia	2024 PFL Welterweight Tournament Final.
Win	17–0	Neiman Gracie	Decision (unanimous)	PFL 9 (2024)	August 23, 2024	3	5:00	Washington, D.C., United States	2024 PFL Welterweight Tournament Semifinal.
Win	16–0	Brennan Ward	Submission (anaconda choke)	PFL 6 (2024)	June 28, 2024	1	3:43	Sioux Falls, South Dakota, United States	
Win	15–0	Andrey Koreshkov	Decision (unanimous)	PFL 3 (2024)	April 19, 2024	3	5:00	Chicago, Illinois, United States	
Win	14–0	Nayib Lopez	Decision (unanimous)	PFL 6 (2023)	June 23, 2023	3	5:00	Atlanta, Georgia, United States	
Win	13–0	Dilano Taylor	KO (punches)	PFL 3 (2023)	April 14, 2023	1	1:31	Las Vegas, Nevada, United States	
Win	12–0	Jarrah Al-Silawi	KO (punch)	PFL 6 (2022)	July 1, 2022	1	3:33	Atlanta, Georgia, United States	
Win	11–0	Leandro Silva	Decision (unanimous)	PFL 7 (2021)	August 13, 2021	3	5:00	Hollywood, Florida, United States	Catchweight (172.5 lb) bout; Silva missed weight.
Win	10–0	Kyron Bowen	TKO (punch)	PFL 3 (2021)	May 6, 2021	2	0:07	Atlantic City, New Jersey, United States	
Win	9–0	Rashid Koychakaev	TKO (punches)	Eagle FC 31	December 19, 2020	3	2:17	Nizhny Novgorod, Russia	Defended the Eagle FC Welterweight Championship.
Win	8–0	Alexey Novikov	TKO (elbows and punches)	Gorilla Fighting 16	August 30, 2019	1	1:12	Astrakhan, Russia	Won the inaugural Gorilla FC Welterweight Championship.
Win	7–0	Vitaly Makiev	KO (knee)	Battle on Volga 8	December 14, 2018	1	3:32	Samara, Russia	
Win	6–0	Rashid Koichakaev	TKO (punches and elbows)	Wolf Fights Cxbatka 7	September 8, 2018	1	N/A	Moscow, Russia	Won the 2018 SMRF Welterweight Grand Prix.
Win	5–0	Hayk Gasparyan	TKO (elbows and punches)	Wolf Fights Cxbatka 7	September 8, 2018	1	N/A	Moscow, Russia	2018 SMRF Welterweight Grand Prix Semifinal.
Win	4–0	Denis Eremenko	TKO (punch)	Wolf Fights Cxbatka 7	September 8, 2018	2	N/A	Moscow, Russia	Return to Welterweight. 2018 SMRF Welterweight Grand Prix Quarterfinal.
Win	3–0	Asan Nurmatov	TKO (punches)	Fight Family Promotion 4	August 26, 2018	1	0:40	Moscow, Russia	
Win	2–0	Mikado Kabali	KO (punches)	Fight Family Promotion 3	July 22, 2018	1	1:05	Moscow, Russia	Middleweight debut.
Win	1–0	Stanislav Vilchinsky	Submission (triangle choke)	Astrakhan MMA Federation: Battle on the Volga	May 8, 2015	1	0:43	Astrakhan, Russia	Welterweight debut.

== See also ==
- Current Professional Fighters League fighters
- List of male mixed martial artists
