= Neiman Gracie =

Brazilian martial artist

- Born: Neiman Gracie Stambowsky; December 12, 1988 (age 37); Rio de Janeiro, Brazil
- Height: 6 ft 0 in (1.83 m)
- Weight: 170 lb (77 kg; 12 st)
- Division: Welterweight
- Reach: 74 in (188 cm)
- Style: Brazilian jiu-jitsu
- Team: Renzo Gracie Jiu-Jitsu Academy; Kings MMA (2020–present)
- Rank: 4th degree Brazilian jiu-jitsu black belt (under Renzo Gracie and Royce Gracie)
- Years active: 2013–present

Mixed martial arts record
- Total: 19
- Wins: 13
- By knockout: 1
- By submission: 9
- By decision: 3
- Losses: 6
- By knockout: 1
- By decision: 5

Other information
- Notable relatives: Gracie family Márcio Stambowsky (Father); Renzo Gracie (uncle)
- Mixed martial arts record from Sherdog

Neiman Gracie (born December 12, 1988) is a Brazilian mixed martial artist, Brazilian jiu-jitsu practitioner, and instructor. A member of the Gracie family, he has competed professionally in mixed martial arts for organizations including Bellator MMA, the World Series of Fighting, and the Professional Fighters League (PFL). Gracie is also the owner and head professor of Neiman Gracie Jiu-Jitsu Academy in Newport Beach, California.

Gracie is a 4th generation member of the Gracie Family of Brazilian jiu-jitsu, great-grandson of Gracie jiu-jitsu founder Carlos Gracie as well as the son of 8th degree coral belt Márcio Stambowsky.

== Early life ==
Neiman Gracie was born on 12 December 1988 in Rio de Janeiro, Brazil. Gracie is the son of Carla Gracie (daughter of Robson Gracie), and Márcio Stambowsky. He is a 4th generation member of the Gracie Family of Brazilian jiu-jitsu. His sister Deborah Gracie Stambowsky is the second female in the Gracie family to achieve the rank of black belt, Gracie started training Brazilian jiu-jitsu as a child at age 7.

== Brazilian jiu-jitsu career ==
Gracie has competed in numerous prestigious BJJ tournaments throughout his grappling career. His accomplishments include both gi and no-gi events, where he has frequently medaled at major competitions.

Notable Achievements: • IBJJF Pan American Championship – Medalist in colored belts. • IBJJF New York Open – Multiple-time champion. • ADCC Competitor – Participated in one of the most prestigious submission grappling circuits. • Superfights – Gracie has competed in several high-profile BJJ superfights, often facing elite grapplers from around the world.

Neiman is particularly known for his attacking guard, back control, and use of classical submissions such as the rear-naked choke and armbar. His technical foundation is based on the Gracie philosophy of leverage and efficiency over athleticism.

== Mixed martial arts career ==
=== World Series of Fighting ===
In 2013, Gracie set his sights on competing in mixed martial arts. He signed with the World Series of Fighting promotion and made his debut in September 2013 at World Series of Fighting 5: Arlovski vs. Kyle, facing Darren Costa. He won the fight via submission in the first round.

Gracie returned to the WSOF decagon on July 5, 2014 at World Series of Fighting 11: Gaethje vs. Newell, facing Dustin Holyko. He again won the fight via submission, this time in the second round.

=== Bellator MMA ===
On October 29, 2014, it was announced that the undefeated Gracie had signed with Bellator MMA.

Gracie made his Bellator debut against Bobby Flynn on February 27, 2015 at Bellator 134. He won the fight via submission in the first round.

For his second fight with the promotion, Gracie faced Roger Carroll at Bellator 151 on March 4, 2016. He won the fight by unanimous decision.

In his third fight for Bellator, Gracie faced Rudy Bears at Bellator 163 on November 4, 2016. He won the fight via submission in the first round.

Gracie faced Dave Marfone at Bellator NYC on June 24, 2017. He won the fight via submission in the second round.

Gracie was expected to face Javier Torres at Bellator 185 on October 20, 2017. Gracie's opponent was changed to Zak Bucia after an injury to Torres. As a result of the Brennan Ward vs David Rickels match being removed from the card, also due to injury, the bout was elevated to co-main event. Gracie won the fight by submission due to a neck crank in the second round.

In his sixth fight for the promotion, Gracie faced Javier Torres at Bellator 198 on April 28, 2018. He won the fight via arm-triangle choke submission in the second round.

==== Bellator Welterweight World Grand Prix and title shot ====
Gracie next entered the Bellator Welterweight Grand Prix. He faced Ed Ruth in the quarterfinals at Bellator 213 on December 15, 2018. He won the fight via rear-naked choke submission in the fourth round.

Gracie faced Rory MacDonald in the semi-finals at Bellator 222 on June 14, 2019. He lost the fight by unanimous decision.

==== Post-Grand Prix ====
Gracie was expected to face Kiichi Kunimoto at Bellator 236 on December 21, 2019. However, Gracie had to withdraw from the bout due to an injury and was replaced by Jason Jackson.

Gracie faced Jon Fitch at Bellator 246 on September 12, 2020. Gracie won the bout via second round submission.

Gracie faced Jason Jackson at Bellator 255 on April 2, 2021. He lost the bout via unanimous decision.

Gracie faced Mark Lemminger on September 18, 2021 at Bellator 266. He won the bout via TKO in the first round, collecting his first knockout win of his career.

Gracie faced Logan Storley on February 19, 2022 at Bellator 274. He lost the mostly standup bout via unanimous decision.

Gracie faced Goiti Yamauchi on August 12, 2022 at Bellator 284. He lost the bout in the second round after being knocked out by an uppercut.

Gracie was scheduled to face Michael Lombardo on February 4, 2023 at Bellator 290. Two weeks before the event, Lombardo was forced to withdraw from the bout and he was replaced by Dante Schiro. Gracie dominated the bout on the way to a unanimous decision victory.

=== Professional Fighters League ===
In his PFL debut, Gracie faced Goiti Yamauchi in a rematch at PFL 3 on April 19, 2024. He lost the bout via unanimous decision.

Gracie next faced Don Madge at PFL 6 (2024) on June 28, 2024. He won the fight via unanimous decision.

Gracie, as a replacement for Don Madge, faced Magomed Umalatov in the semifinals of the 2024 Welterweight tournament on August 23, 2024 at PFL 9. He lost the fight by unanimous decision.

== Instructor lineage ==
Kano Jigoro → Mitsuyo "Count Koma" Maeda → Carlos Gracie → Helio Gracie → Carlos Gracie Jr. > Renzo Gracie > Neiman Gracie

== Championships and achievements ==
=== Brazilian jiu-jitsu ===
Main Achievements (at black belt level):

- 2nd Place NY International Open Championship (2012)
- 2nd Place NY Summer Open Championship (2015)
- 3rd Place IBJJF World No-Gi Championship 3rd Place (2013 black)

Main Achievements (at colored belts):

- IBJJF Pan American Champion (2008 purple)
- IBJJF Pan American No-Gi Champion (2008 purple)
- IBJJF American National Champion (2007 purple)
- NY International Open Champion (2009 purple)
- 2nd Place NY International Open Championship (2010 purple)
- 3rd Place IBJJF World Championship (2008 purple, 2005 blue junior)
- 3rd Place IBJJF Pan American Championship (2007/2009 purple)
- 3rd Place IBJJF Pan American No-Gi Championship (2011 brown)
- 3rd Place Brazilian National Championship (2004 blue junior)
- 3rd Place IBJJF NY International Open Championship (2009 purple, (Note: absolute) 2011 brown)

=== Mixed martial arts ===
- Bellator MMA
  - Second most submission wins in Bellator MMA history (seven)
  - Most submission wins in Bellator MMA Welterweight division history (six)

== Mixed martial arts record ==
Professional record breakdown
19 matches	13 wins	6 losses
By knockout	1	1
By submission	9	0
By decision	3	5

Res.	Record	Opponent	Method	Event	Date	Round	Time	Location	Notes
Loss	13–6	Magomed Umalatov	Decision (unanimous)	PFL 9 (2024)	August 23, 2024	3	5:00	Washington, D.C., United States	2024 PFL Welterweight Tournament Semifinal.
Win	13–5	Don Madge	Decision (unanimous)	PFL 6 (2024)	June 28, 2024	3	5:00	Sioux Falls, South Dakota, United States	
Loss	12–5	Goiti Yamauchi	Decision (unanimous)	PFL 3 (2024)	April 19, 2024	3	5:00	Chicago, Illinois, United States	
Win	12–4	Dante Schiro	Decision (unanimous)	Bellator 290	February 4, 2023	3	5:00	Inglewood, California, United States	
Loss	11–4	Goiti Yamauchi	KO (punches)	Bellator 284	August 12, 2022	2	3:58	Sioux Falls, South Dakota, United States	
Loss	11–3	Logan Storley	Decision (unanimous)	Bellator 274	February 19, 2022	5	5:00	Uncasville, Connecticut, United States	
Win	11–2	Mark Lemminger	TKO (elbows and punches)	Bellator 266	September 18, 2021	1	1:27	San Jose, California, United States	
Loss	10–2	Jason Jackson	Decision (unanimous)	Bellator 255	April 2, 2021	3	5:00	Uncasville, Connecticut, United States	
Win	10–1	Jon Fitch	Submission (heel hook)	Bellator 246	September 12, 2020	2	4:47	Uncasville, Connecticut, United States	
Loss	9–1	Rory MacDonald	Decision (unanimous)	Bellator 222	June 14, 2019	5	5:00	New York City, New York, United States	Bellator Welterweight World Grand Prix Semifinal. For the Bellator Welterweight World Championship.
Win	9–0	Ed Ruth	Submission (rear-naked choke)	Bellator 213	December 15, 2018	4	2:17	Honolulu, Hawaii, United States	Bellator Welterweight World Grand Prix Quarterfinal.
Win	8–0	Javier Torres	Submission (arm-triangle choke)	Bellator 198	April 28, 2018	2	3:18	Rosemont, Illinois, United States	
Win	7–0	Zak Bucia	Submission (neck crank)	Bellator 185	October 20, 2017	2	2:27	Uncasville, Connecticut, United States	
Win	6–0	Dave Marfone	Submission (rear-naked choke)	Bellator NYC	June 24, 2017	2	2:27	New York City, New York, United States	
Win	5–0	Rudy Bears	Submission (armbar)	Bellator 163	November 4, 2016	1	4:39	Uncasville, Connecticut, United States	Catchweight (175 lb) bout.
Win	4–0	Roger Carroll	Decision (unanimous)	Bellator 151	March 4, 2016	3	5:00	Thackerville, Oklahoma, United States	
Win	3–0	Bobby Flynn	Submission (neck crank)	Bellator 134	February 27, 2015	1	2:36	Uncasville, Connecticut, United States	Welterweight debut.
Win	2–0	Dustin Holyko	Submission (rear-naked choke)	WSOF 11	July 5, 2014	2	2:21	Daytona Beach, Florida, United States	Catchweight (175 lb) bout.
Win	1–0	Darren Costa	Submission (armbar)	WSOF 5	September 14, 2013	1	3:57	Atlantic City, New Jersey, United States	Middleweight debut.

== Freestyle wrestling record ==
Freestyle matches
Res.	Record	Opponent	Score	Date	Event	Location
Loss	0-2	(Russia) Arman Tsarukyan	0-10	November 14, 2026	RAF Abu Dhabi: Chimaev vs. Weidman	(United Arab Emirates) Abu Dhabi
Loss	0-1	(Russia) Sharabutdin Magomedov	3-11	September 5, 2026	RAF Moscow	(Russia) Moscow

== Personal life ==
Gracie and his wife Karina have two daughters,

== See also ==
- List of Brazilian jiu-jitsu practitioners
- List of current Bellator fighters
