= PFL 6 (2024) =

Professional Fighters League MMA event in 2024

- The poster for PFL 6
- Promotion: Professional Fighters League
- Date: June 28, 2024
- Venue: Sanford Pentagon
- City: Sioux Falls, South Dakota, United States

Event chronology
PFL 5	PFL 6	PFL MENA 2

The PFL 6 mixed martial arts event for the 2024 season of the Professional Fighters League was held on June 28, 2024, at the Sanford Pentagon in Sioux Falls, South Dakota, United States. This marked the sixth regular-season event of the tournament and included fights in the Featherweight and Welterweight divisions.

== Background ==
This event marked the organization's debut in Sioux Falls and South Dakota state.

The event was headlined by a featherweight bout between 2022 PFL featherweight winner Brendan Loughnane and former LFA Featherweight Champion Justin Gonzales.

Roughly a week before the card there were several fight changes made:

- Laureano Staropoli was expected to face former interim Bellator Welterweight Champion Logan Storley in a welterweight, but he withdrew for unknown reasons and was replaced by Luca Poclit, who was scheduled to face Zach Juusola at this event.
- Ádám Borics was scheduled to face former Cage Warriors Bantamweight Champion Brett Johns in a featherweight, but Borics pulled out and was replaced by Tyler Diamond, who was scheduled to face Jose Perez at this event.

At weigh-ins, Gabriel Alves Braga came in at 150.6 lbs, 4.6 pounds over the limit for featherweight. He was fined 20% of his purse and given a point deduction in the standings.

== Results ==
Main card (ESPN / ESPN+)
Weight class				Method	Round	Time	Notes
Featherweight	Brendan Loughnane	def.	Justin Gonzales	TKO (doctor stoppage)	2	3:34
Welterweight	Logan Storley	def.	Luca Poclit	Decision (unanimous) (30–27, 29–28, 29–28)	3	5:00
Welterweight	Magomed Umalatov	def.	Brennan Ward	Submission (anaconda choke)	1	3:43
Featherweight	Gabriel Alves Braga	def.	Bubba Jenkins	TKO (arm injury)	2	1:48	(Note: Braga missed weight (150.6 lb).)
Preliminary card (ESPN+)
Welterweight	Lorenz Larkin	def.	Alan Dominguez	TKO (knee and punches)	1	4:46
Welterweight	Shamil Musaev	def.	Murad Ramazanov	TKO (punches)	2	1:51
Featherweight	Kai Kamaka III	def.	Pedro Carvalho	Decision (unanimous) (30–27, 29–28, 29–28)	3	5:00
Welterweight	Andrey Koreshkov	def.	Goiti Yamauchi	Decision (unanimous) (29–28, 29–27, 29–27)	3	5:00
Featherweight	Timur Khizriev	def.	Enrique Barzola	Decision (unanimous) (30–27, 30–27, 30–27)	3	5:00
Welterweight	Neiman Gracie	def.	Don Madge	Decision (unanimous) (30–27, 30–27, 30–27)	3	5:00
Featherweight	Tyler Diamond	def.	Brett Johns	Decision (unanimous) (29–28, 29–28, 29–28)	3	5:00

== Standings after event ==
The PFL points system is based on results of the match. The winner of a fight receives 3 points. If the fight ends in a draw, both fighters will receive 1 point. The bonus for winning a fight in the first, second, or third round is 3 points, 2 points, and 1 point respectively. The bonus for winning in the third round requires a fight be stopped before 4:59 of the third round. No bonus point will be awarded if a fighter wins via decision. For example, if a fighter wins a fight in the first round, then the fighter will receive 6 total points. A decision win will result in three total points. If a fighter misses weight, the opponent (should they comply with weight limits) will receive 3 points due to a walkover victory, regardless of winning or losing the bout; if the non-offending fighter subsequently wins with a stoppage, all bonus points will be awarded.

=== Welterweight ===
Fighter	Wins	Draws	Losses	1st	2nd	3rd	Total Points (Note: The four fighters with most points advance to the playoffs)
♛ (Russia) Shamil Musaev	2	0	0	0	2	0	10
♛ (Russia) Magomed Umalatov	2	0	0	1	0	0	9
♛ (South Africa) Don Madge	1	0	1	1	0	0	6
♛ (Russia) Murad Ramazanov	1	0	1	1	0	0	6
E (Brazil) Neiman Gracie	1	0	1	0	0	0	3
E (Russia) Andrey Koreshkov	1	0	1	0	0	0	3
E (Brazil) Goiti Yamauchi	1	0	1	0	0	0	3
E (United States) Logan Storley	1	0	1	0	0	0	3
E (Moldova) Luca Poclit	0	0	1	0	0	0	0
E (United States) Brennan Ward	0	0	1	0	0	0	0
E (Argentina) Laureano Staropoli	0	0	1	0	0	0	-1

=== Featherweight ===
Fighter	Wins	Draws	Losses	1st	2nd	3rd	Total Points (Note: The four fighters with most points advance to the playoffs)
♛ (England) Brendan Loughnane	2	0	0	1	1	0	11
♛ (Brazil) Gabriel Alves Braga	2	0	0	1	1	0	10
♛ (Russia) Timur Khizriev	2	0	0	0	0	0	6
♛ (United States) Kai Kamaka III	2	0	0	0	0	0	6
E (Hungary) Ádám Borics	1	0	0	0	0	0	3
E (United States) Tyler Diamond	1	0	0	0	0	0	3
E (United States) Justin Gonzales	0	0	1	0	0	0	0
E (United States) Bubba Jenkins	0	0	2	0	0	0	0
E (Portugal) Pedro Carvalho	0	0	2	0	0	0	0
E (Peru) Enrique Barzola	0	0	2	0	0	0	0
E (Wales) Brett Johns	0	0	2	0	0	0	0

== See also ==
- List of PFL events
- List of current PFL fighters
