= PFL 9 (2024) =

Professional Fighters League MMA event in 2024

- The poster for PFL 9
- Promotion: Professional Fighters League
- Date: August 23, 2024
- Venue: The Anthem
- City: Washington, D.C., United States

Event chronology
| PFL 8 | PFL 9 | PFL MENA 3 |

The PFL 9 mixed martial arts event for the 2024 season of the Professional Fighters League was held on August 23, 2024, at The Anthem in Washington, D.C., United States. This marked the semi-final playoffs for the Featherweight and Welterweight divisions.

== Background ==
The event marked the promotion's fifth visit to the American capital and first since PFL 10 (2023) in November 2023.

The event featured the semifinal of 2024 PFL playoffs in a welterweight and featherweight divisions.

The semifinal of the 2024 Welterweight tournament between Don Madge and Magomed Umalatov was scheduled for this event. However, Madge pulled out due to injury and was replaced by Neiman Gracie, who scheduled to face Luca Poclit and he was rebooked to face Eric Alequin instead.

James Gallagher was expected to make his promotional debut against Brahyan Zurcher. However, on August 14, it was announced he had visa issues and he was replaced by Marcirley Alves. In turn, the bout was scrapped after Zurcher withdrew.

During the weigh-ins, Eric Alequin didn't appear for his fight against Luca Poclit. Alequin subsequently did not pass his medical exams and the bout was cancelled.

== Results ==
Main card (ESPN / ESPN+)
| Weight class | | | | Method | Round | Time | Notes |
|---|---|---|---|---|---|---|---|
| Featherweight | Brendan Loughnane | def. | Kai Kamaka III | Decision (split) (29–28, 28–29, 30–27) | 3 | 5:00 | (Note: 2024 PFL Featherweight Tournament Semifinal.) |
| Welterweight | Magomed Umalatov | def. | Neiman Gracie | Decision (unanimous) (30–27, 29–28, 29–28) | 3 | 5:00 | (Note: 2024 PFL Welterweight Tournament Semifinal.) |
| Featherweight | Timur Khizriev | def. | Gabriel Alves Braga | Decision (split) (30–27, 28–29, 30–27) | 3 | 5:00 | (Note: 2024 PFL Featherweight Tournament Semifinal.) |
| Welterweight | Shamil Musaev | def. | Murad Ramazanov | Decision (unanimous) (29–28, 30–27, 30–27) | 3 | 5:00 | (Note: 2024 PFL Welterweight Tournament Semifinal.) |
Preliminary card (ESPN+)
| Welterweight | Mukhamed Berkhamov | def. | Ray Cooper III | Decision (split) (29–28, 28–29, 29–28) | 3 | 5:00 |
| Featherweight | Enrique Barzola | def. | Tyler Diamond | Decision (unanimous) (29–28, 29–28, 29–28) | 3 | 5:00 | (Note: 2024 PFL Featherweight Tournament Alternate bout.) |
| Welterweight | Jose Perez | def. | Jesse Stirn | Decision (unanimous) (29–28, 30–27, 30–27) | 3 | 5:00 |
| Heavyweight | Maxwell Djantou Nana | def. | Kent Mafileo | KO (punch) | 2 | 4:50 |
| Welterweight | Shido Boris Esperança | def. | Tyler Hill | TKO (punches) | 1 | 3:31 |

== Playoff brackets ==
=== 2024 PFL Welterweight playoffs ===
Semifinals
1 | (Russia) Shamil Musaev | UD
4 | (Russia) Murad Ramazanov | 3
2 | (Russia) Magomed Umalatov | UD
7 | (Brazil) Neiman Gracie (Note: Umalatov was originally scheduled to face #3 ranked Don Madge, but he forced to withdraw due to injury and was replaced by #7 ranked Neiman Gracie.) | 3

Finals
(Russia) Shamil Musaev
(Russia) Magomed Umalatov

=== 2024 PFL Featherweight playoffs ===
Semifinals
1 | (England) Brendan Loughnane | SD
4 | (United States) Kai Kamaka III | 3
2 | (Brazil) Gabriel Alves Braga | 3
3 | (Russia) Timur Khizriev | SD

Finals
(England) Brendan Loughnane
(Russia) Timur Khizriev

== See also ==
- List of PFL events
- List of current PFL fighters
