= Brendan Loughnane =

English mixed martial artist

- Born: December 5, 1989 (age 36); Manchester, England
- Height: 5 ft 10 in (1.78 m)
- Weight: 145 lb (66 kg; 10 st 5 lb)
- Division: Featherweight; Lightweight
- Reach: 70 in (178 cm)
- Fighting out of: Manchester, England
- Team: Manchester Predators
- Years active: 2010–present

Mixed martial arts record
- Total: 36
- Wins: 30
- By knockout: 17
- By submission: 1
- By decision: 12
- Losses: 6
- By knockout: 1
- By decision: 5

Other information
- Mixed martial arts record from Sherdog

Brendan Loughnane (born December 5, 1989) is a British professional mixed martial artist. He competes in the Featherweight division of the Professional Fighters League (PFL). Loughnane has been a professional competitor since 2010, and competed in the Ultimate Fighting Championship (UFC), Absolute Championship Akhmat (ACB) and BAMMA.

== Background ==
Born in Manchester, England, and growing up in Withington, Brendan attended The Barlow RC High School in Didsbury as an energetic, athletic, and football-loving teenager. Loughnane grew up around sports, having played football at a junior level for Stockport County F.C. He also lived close to Jesse Lingard and would occasionally go to his house to play football. One of his neighbors introduced him to mixed martial arts (MMA) and took him to the gym for training. Brendan quickly fell in love with the sport and, after only three months of training, he had his first amateur fight at the age of 18. He was thrilled to earn £150 for the fight and celebrated with his friends at a local casino. Brendan went on to win his first five amateur fights before turning professional in 2010. Although he had recently completed a BTEC in mechanical engineering at North Trafford College, he decided to pursue a career in MMA. In order to train, Brendan used a football cage at Platt Fields Park in Fallowfield as a makeshift gym, which attracted the attention of those passing by.

== Mixed martial arts career ==
=== Early career ===
Loughnane made his amateur debut in 2008 where he went 5–0 with 4 first round finishes, before making his professional debut in June 2010 at X-Treme Kombat with a second round knockout win over Jordan Desborough. He then amassed a record of 6–0 in various regional promotions before going on The Ultimate Fighter.

=== The Ultimate Fighter: The Smashes ===
Loughnane appeared on The Ultimate Fighter: The Smashes in 2012 joining Team UK in the lightweight bracket after replacing Michael Pastou who suffered an injury in episode two which left him unable to compete. Loughnane started the tournament off well with a unanimous decision victory over Patrick Iodice. However he would later lose to Norman Parke via unanimous decision in episode ten.

Loughnane lost to Mike Wilkinson by unanimous decision on 15 December 2012 at UFC on FX: Sotiropoulos vs. Pearson ultimately missing out on the opportunity to win a UFC contract.

=== Post TUF Smashes ===
In 2013 Loughnane joined Full Contact Contender (FCC) where he became the FCC Lightweight Champion after defeating Jason Cooledge via unanimous decision shortly later. He defended the title once with a win over Ali Maclean.

In 2014 Loughnane signed with BAMMA where he competed at Featherweight. After going 2–0 in the promotion Loughnane faced Tom Duquesnoy for the BAMMA Featherweight Championship where he lost via a controversial split decision

He returned in 2016 and reclaimed the FCC Lightweight title with a knockout win over David Lee, making him a two-time champion and would go on to collect two stoppage victories under the Tanko FC banner against Eden Newton and Paul Cook.

Loughnane signed with Absolute Championship Akhmat and made his debut on 11 March 2017 at ACB 53 with a knockout win over Mike Wilkinson whom he had previously lost to on his UFC debut. This fight earned him Knockout of the Night.

Loughnane faced Pat Healy on July 22, 2017, at ACB 65: Silva vs. Agnaev. He lost the back-and-forth fight via split decision.

Loughnane faced Paata Tsxapelia on November 25, 2017, at ACB 75: Gadzhidaudov vs. Zieliński, winning the bout via head kick knockout in the third round.

After picking up a win over Amaury Junior at Celtic Gladiator 22, stopping him with leg kicks in the second round, he was invited to Dana White's Contender Series 17, where despite beating Bill Algeo via unanimous decision, he was not given a contract due to Dana White being upset that he went for a takedown in the last minute of a bout he was dominating.

=== Professional Fighters League ===
Loughnane made his PFL debut against Matt Wagy on October 7, 2019, at PFL 7, winning the bout via unanimous decision.

In his sophomore performance, Loughnane would face David Valente on December 31, 2019, at PFL 10, picking up his second straight unanimous decision victory under the PFL banner.

==== 2021 Season ====
Loughnane faced Sheymon Moraes on April 23, 2021, at PFL 1. He won the bout via KO in the first round, picking up his first stoppage victory in PFL.

Returning at PFL 4 on June 10, 2021, Loughnane had a hard-fought close bout with Tyler Diamond, winning the bout via majority decision and securing a spot in the PFL playoffs.

In the semi-finals of the 2021 Featherweight tournament, Loughnane faced Movlid Khaybulaev at PFL 9 on August 27, 2021, losing a close bout via split decision.

==== 2022 Season ====
Returning for another season, Loughnane faced Ryoji Kudo on February 21, 2022, at PFL 2, winning the bout via technical unanimous decision after an accidental clash of heads opened a cut on Kudo and rendered him unable to continue.

Loughnane was initially scheduled to face Boston Salmon on June 24, 2022, at PFL 5, however Salmon was forced to pull out for unknown reasons and was replaced by Ago Huskić. He won the bout via unanimous decision and secured a spot in the playoffs for the second year running.

Loughnane faced Chris Wade in the Semifinals of the Featherweight tournament on August 20, 2022, at PFL 9. He won the bout via unanimous decision to advance to the final.

Loughnane faced Bubba Jenkins in the finals of the Featherweight tournament on November 25, 2022, at PFL 10. He won the bout via TKO stoppage in the fourth round to win the $1 million collective tournament pool.

==== 2023 Season ====
Loughnane started the 2023 season against Marlon Moraes on April 1, 2023, at PFL 1. He won the bout in the second round, after a barrage of leg kicks left Moraes unable to continue to fight.

Loughnane faced Jesus Pinedo on June 8, 2023, at PFL 4. He lost the fight via knockout early into the first round, the first stoppage of his MMA career.

==== 2024 Season ====
Loughnane faced Pedro Carvalho on April 19, 2024 at PFL 3 (2024). He won the fight via TKO in the first round.

Loughnane next faced Justin Gonzales at PFL 6 (2024) on June 28, 2024. He won the fight via TKO due to a doctor stoppage due to a cut in round 2.

Loughnane faced Kai Kamaka III in the semifinals of the 2024 Featherweight tournament on August 23, 2024 at PFL 9. He won the fight by split decision.

In the final, Loughnane faced Timur Khizriev on November 29, 2024, at PFL 10. He lost the fight by unanimous decision.

== Championships and accomplishments ==
=== Mixed martial arts ===
- Professional Fighters League
  - 2022 PFL Featherweight Championship
- Full Contact Contender
  - FCC Lightweight Championship (One time)
    - Three successful title defenses
- Celtic Gladiator
  - Interim CG Featherweight Championship
- MMA Fighting
  - 2022 Second Team MMA All-Star

== Mixed martial arts record ==
Professional record breakdown
36 matches	30 wins	6 losses
By knockout	17	1
By submission	1	0
By decision	12	5

Res.	Record	Opponent	Method	Event	Date	Round	Time	Location	Notes
Loss	30–6	Timur Khizriev	Decision (unanimous)	PFL 10 (2024)	November 29, 2024	5	5:00	Riyadh, Saudi Arabia	2024 PFL Featherweight Tournament Final.
Win	30–5	Kai Kamaka III	Decision (split)	PFL 9 (2024)	August 23, 2024	3	5:00	Washington, D.C., United States	2024 PFL Featherweight Tournament Semifinal.
Win	29–5	Justin Gonzales	TKO (doctor stoppage)	PFL 6 (2024)	June 28, 2024	2	3:34	Sioux Falls, South Dakota, United States	
Win	28–5	Pedro Carvalho	TKO (punches)	PFL 3 (2024)	April 19, 2024	1	1:26	Chicago, Illinois, United States	
Loss	27–5	Jesus Pinedo	KO (knee and punches)	PFL 4 (2023)	June 8, 2023	1	1:34	Atlanta, Georgia, United States	
Win	27–4	Marlon Moraes	TKO (leg kicks)	PFL 1 (2023)	April 1, 2023	2	1:11	Las Vegas, Nevada, United States	
Win	26–4	Bubba Jenkins	TKO (punches)	PFL 10 (2022)	November 25, 2022	4	2:38	New York City, New York, United States	Won the 2022 PFL Featherweight Tournament.
Win	25–4	Chris Wade	Decision (unanimous)	PFL 9 (2022)	August 20, 2022	3	5:00	London, England	2022 PFL Featherweight Tournament Semifinal.
Win	24–4	Ago Huskić	Decision (unanimous)	PFL 5 (2022)	June 24, 2022	3	5:00	Atlanta, Georgia, United States	
Win	23–4	Ryoji Kudo	Technical Decision (unanimous)	PFL 2 (2022)	April 28, 2022	3	3:00	Arlington, Texas, United States	Accidental clash of heads rendered Kudo unable to continue.
Loss	22–4	Movlid Khaybulaev	Decision (split)	PFL 9 (2021)	August 27, 2021	3	5:00	Hollywood, Florida, United States	2021 PFL Featherweight Tournament Semifinal.
Win	22–3	Tyler Diamond	Decision (majority)	PFL 4 (2021)	June 10, 2021	3	5:00	Atlantic City, New Jersey, United States	
Win	21–3	Sheymon Moraes	KO (punches)	PFL 1 (2021)	April 23, 2021	1	2:55	Atlantic City, New Jersey, United States	
Win	20–3	David Valente	Decision (unanimous)	PFL 10 (2019)	December 31, 2019	3	5:00	New York City, New York, United States	
Win	19–3	Matt Wagy	Decision (unanimous)	PFL 7 (2019)	October 11, 2019	3	5:00	Las Vegas, Nevada, United States	
Win	18–3	Bill Algeo	Decision (unanimous)	Dana White's Contender Series 17	June 18, 2019	3	5:00	Las Vegas, Nevada, United States	
Win	17–3	Amaury Junior	KO (leg kicks)	Celtic Gladiator 22	November 30, 2018	2	0:44	Manchester, England	Won the interim CG Featherweight Championship.
Win	16–3	Paata Tsxapelia	KO (head kick)	ACB 75	November 25, 2017	3	3:40	Stuttgart, Germany	
Loss	15–3	Pat Healy	Decision (split)	ACB 65	July 22, 2017	3	5:00	Sheffield, England	Lightweight bout.
Win	15–2	Mike Wilkinson	KO (knee)	ACB 54	March 11, 2017	1	2:30	Manchester, England	Return to Featherweight. Knockout of the Night.
Win	14–2	Paul Cook	TKO (punches)	Tankō FC 2	December 3, 2016	3	3:16	Manchester, England	
Win	13–2	Eden Newton	TKO (elbows)	Tankō FC 1	August 13, 2016	2	4:07	Manchester, England	
Win	12–2	David Lee	KO (punches)	Full Contact Contender 15	March 5, 2016	1	1:31	Bolton, England	Return to Lightweight. Defended the FCC Lightweight Championship.
Loss	11–2	Tom Duquesnoy	Decision (split)	BAMMA 22	September 19, 2015	3	5:00	Dublin, Ireland	For the BAMMA World Featherweight Championship.
Win	11–1	Steve Polifonte	Decision (unanimous)	BAMMA 19	March 28, 2015	3	5:00	Blackpool, England	
Win	10–1	Florian Rousseau	TKO (punches)	BAMMA 17	December 6, 2014	1	4:48	Manchester, England	Featherweight debut.
Win	9–1	Ali Maclean	TKO (punches)	Full Contact Contender 11	October 18, 2014	2	0:55	Bolton, England	Defended the FCC Lightweight Championship.
Win	8–1	Jason Cooledge	Decision (unanimous)	Full Contact Contender 9	March 22, 2014	3	5:00	Bolton, England	Defended the FCC Lightweight Championship.
Win	7–1	Tim Close	Decision (unanimous)	Full Contact Contender 7	September 7, 2013	3	5:00	Bolton, England	Won the FCC Lightweight Championship.
Loss	6–1	Mike Wilkinson	Decision (unanimous)	UFC on FX: Sotiropoulos vs. Pearson	December 15, 2012	3	5:00	Gold Coast, Australia	
Win	6–0	Danny Welsh	Submission (rear-naked choke)	UCC 11	April 27, 2012	1	1:36	Manchester, England	
Win	5–0	Jordan Miller	Decision (unanimous)	UFA 1	October 2, 2011	3	5:00	Knutsford, England	
Win	4–0	Dave Straughton	TKO (submission to punches)	Cage Conflict 8	February 25, 2011	1	0:51	Blackburn, England	
Win	3–0	Shaun Law	TKO (corner stoppage)	UCC 3	September 17, 2010	1	1:01	Blackpool, England	
Win	2–0	Manos Skoulas	TKO (punches)	Greece Regional Show	July 3, 2010	1	N/A	Malia, Greece	
Win	1–0	Jordan Desborough	TKO (punches)	X-Treme Kombat 2	June 26, 2010	2	1:18	Ulverston, England	Lightweight debut.

== See also ==
- List of current PFL fighters
- List of Dana White's Contender Series alumni
- List of male mixed martial artists
