= Pedro Carvalho (fighter) =

Portuguese mixed martial artist (born 1995)

- Born: Pedro Carvalho; 8 June 1995 (age 31); Guimarães, Braga District, Portugal
- Other names: The Game
- Nationality: Portuguese
- Height: 5 ft 11 in (180 cm)
- Weight: 145 lb (66 kg; 10 st 5 lb)
- Division: Featherweight; Lightweight
- Reach: 70 in (178 cm)
- Style: Kickboxing, Brazilian Jiu-Jitsu
- Stance: Southpaw
- Fighting out of: Dublin, Ireland
- Team: SBG Ireland
- Rank: Purple belt in Brazilian Jiu-Jitsu under John Kavanagh
- Years active: 2012–present

Mixed martial arts record
- Total: 26
- Wins: 15
- By knockout: 2
- By submission: 7
- By decision: 6
- Losses: 11
- By knockout: 4
- By submission: 1
- By decision: 5
- By disqualification: 1

Other information
- Mixed martial arts record from Sherdog

Pedro Carvalho (born 8 June 1995), is a Portuguese mixed martial artist currently competing in the Featherweight division. He has previously competed in Bellator MMA and Professional Fighters League (PFL).

== Background ==
Carvalho was born in Guimarães, a town in the Braga District of Portugal, with his father abandoning the family one month before his birth. At the age of 12, he decided to become a MMA fighter after seeing UFC ads on TV, even though there was not an advanced MMA scene in the country at the time. He began training soon after at the gym of Portuguese MMA pioneer, Rafael Silva. Prior to signing with Bellator, Carvalho worked in a factory and also did custodial work for a hospital while fighting on the regional circuit in Portugal, working to save enough money to move to Ireland to train with SBG to help his MMA career take off.

== Mixed martial arts career ==
Carvalho made his professional mixed martial arts debut in September 2012 after turning 17, fighting on the regional scene in Portugal. His first fight came against Edi Vicente, a fight Carvalho won via first-round submission. Carvalho went 7–3 in his career before finally signing with Bellator MMA in 2018.

=== Bellator MMA ===
After getting signed to Bellator, Carvalho made his promotional debut against Daniel Crawford at Bellator 200 on 25 May 2018. He won the bout via split decision.

Carvalho next faced Luca Vitali on 1 December 2018 at Bellator 211. He won via guillotine submission just 43 seconds into the first round.

Carvalho faced Bellator veteran Derek Campos on 4 May 2019 at Bellator Birmingham. He was victorious via first-round technical knockout.

After going 3–0 in the promotion, Carvalho entered the Bellator Featherweight World Grand Prix next. In the opening round, Carvalho faced Sam Sicilia at Bellator 226 on 7 September 2019. Carvalho was victorious via first round submission.

In the quarterfinal round of the tournament, Carvalho was expected to face Patrício Freire for the Bellator Featherweight World Championship at Bellator 241 on 13 March 2020. However, the event was cancelled and the bout was put on hold due to the COVID-19 pandemic. The bout will now take place at Bellator 252 on 12 November. Carvalho lost the fight via knockout in the first round.

Carvalho faced Jay Jay Wilson on April 16, 2021, at Bellator 257. At the weigh-ins, Jay Jay Wilson missed weight by .75 pounds and was fined 20% of his purse. He lost the bout a minute into the second round, getting dropped by a spinning backfist and then ground and pound.

Carvalho faced Daniel Weichel at Bellator 270 on November 5, 2021. He won the bout via unanimous decision.

Carvalho was scheduled to face Khasan Askhabov on May 6, 2022, at Bellator 280. However, due to undisclosed reasons, Askhabov was forced to pull out and was replaced by promotional newcomer Piotr Niedzielski. He lost the close bout via split decision.

Carvalho faced Mads Burnell on September 23, 2022, at Bellator 285. He won the bout via unanimous decision.

Carvalho faced Jeremy Kennedy on February 25, 2023, at Bellator 291. He lost the fight by unanimous decision.

Carvalho faced Aaron Pico on September 23, 2023 at Bellator 299. He lost the fight via ground and pound TKO in the first round.

=== Professional Fighters League ===
In his PFL debut, Carvalho faced Brendan Loughnane on April 19, 2024 at PFL 3 (2024). He lost the fight via TKO in the first round.

Carvalho next faced Kai Kamaka III at PFL 6 (2024) on June 28, 2024, losing the fight via unanimous decision.

==== Global Fight League ====
On December 11, 2024, it was announced that Carvalho was signed by Global Fight League. However, in April 2025, it was reported that all GFL events were cancelled indefinitely.

=== Return to PFL ===
After competing at independent promotion, Carvalho faced Sergio Cossio on April 16, 2026, at PFL Belfast. He won the fight via unanimous decision.

== Championships and accomplishments ==
- Cage Legacy Fighting Championship
  - CLFC Lightweight Championship (One time)

== Mixed martial arts record ==
Professional record breakdown
| 26 matches | 15 wins | 11 losses |
| By knockout | 2 | 4 |
| By submission | 7 | 1 |
| By decision | 6 | 5 |
| By disqualification | 0 | 1 |

| Res. | Record | Opponent | Method | Event | Date | Round | Time | Location | Notes |
|---|---|---|---|---|---|---|---|---|---|
| Loss | 15–11 | Levan Kirtadze | Decision (split) | Rkena FC x PFL | October 17, 2026 | 3 | 5:00 | Tbilisi, Georgia | Return to Lightweight. |
| Win | 15–10 | Sergio Cossio | Decision (unanimous) | PFL Belfast: Kelly vs. Wilson | April 16, 2026 | 3 | 5:00 | Belfast, Northern Ireland | Catchweight (165 lb) bout. |
| Win | 14–10 | Damien Lapilus | Submission (rear-naked choke) | WNC 3 | October 18, 2025 | 1 | 2:10 | Geneva, Switzerland | Won the inaugural WNC Featherweight Championship. |
| Loss | 13–10 | Kai Kamaka III | Decision (unanimous) | PFL 6 (2024) | June 28, 2024 | 3 | 5:00 | Sioux Falls, South Dakota, United States | |
| Loss | 13–9 | Brendan Loughnane | TKO (punches) | PFL 3 (2024) | April 19, 2024 | 1 | 1:26 | Chicago, Illinois, United States | |
| Loss | 13–8 | Aaron Pico | TKO (punches) | Bellator 299 | September 23, 2023 | 1 | 3:05 | Dublin, Ireland | |
| Loss | 13–7 | Jeremy Kennedy | Decision (unanimous) | Bellator 291 | February 25, 2023 | 3 | 5:00 | Dublin, Ireland | |
| Win | 13–6 | Mads Burnell | Decision (unanimous) | Bellator 285 | September 23, 2022 | 3 | 5:00 | Dublin, Ireland | |
| Loss | 12–6 | Piotr Niedzielski | Decision (split) | Bellator 280 | May 6, 2022 | 3 | 5:00 | Paris, France | |
| Win | 12–5 | Daniel Weichel | Decision (unanimous) | Bellator 270 | November 5, 2021 | 3 | 5:00 | Dublin, Ireland | |
| Loss | 11–5 | Jay-Jay Wilson | TKO (punches) | Bellator 257 | April 16, 2021 | 2 | 0:53 | Uncasville, Connecticut, United States | Catchweight (146.75 lb) bout; Wilson missed weight. |
| Loss | 11–4 | Patrício Pitbull | KO (punches) | Bellator 252 | November 12, 2020 | 1 | 2:10 | Uncasville, Connecticut, United States | Bellator Featherweight World Grand Prix Quarterfinal. For the Bellator Featherweight World Championship. |
| Win | 11–3 | Sam Sicilia | Submission (face crank) | Bellator 226 | 7 September 2019 | 2 | 1:56 | San Jose, California, United States | Return to Featherweight. Bellator Featherweight World Grand Prix Opening Round. |
| Win | 10–3 | Derek Campos | TKO (punches) | Bellator Birmingham | 4 May 2019 | 1 | 2:02 | Birmingham, England | |
| Win | 9–3 | Luca Vitali | Submission (guillotine choke) | Bellator 211 | 1 December 2018 | 1 | 0:43 | Genoa, Italy | Return to Lightweight. |
| Win | 8–3 | Daniel Crawford | Decision (split) | Bellator 200 | 25 May 2018 | 3 | 5:00 | London, England | Featherweight debut. |
| Win | 7–3 | Ibragim Kantaev | Decision (unanimous) | Cage Legacy FC 7 | 10 March 2018 | 3 | 5:00 | Drogheda, Ireland | Won the CLFC Lightweight Championship. |
| Win | 6–3 | Jeanderson Castro | Submission (armbar) | Cage Legacy FC 4 | 29 October 2017 | 1 | N/A | Drogheda, Ireland | |
| Loss | 5–3 | Adenir Araujo | Decision (unanimous) | International Pro Combat 8 | 16 November 2015 | 3 | 5:00 | Estoril, Portugal | |
| Loss | 5–2 | Wisma Lima | DQ (knee to downed opponent) | Invictus: Pro MMA League 3 | 20 June 2015 | N/A | N/A | Matosinhos, Portugal | |
| Win | 5–1 | Paulo Fonseca | Submission (rear-naked choke) | Cage Fighters Challengers 3 | 31 January 2015 | 1 | 1:36 | Matosinhos, Portugal | |
| Win | 4–1 | Patrick Fernandes | TKO (head kick and punches) | MMA Maranus 2014 | 8 November 2014 | 1 | 1:42 | Amarante, Portugal | |
| Win | 3–1 | Bruno Borges | Decision (split) | Invictus: Pro MMA League 1 | 27 July 2014 | 3 | 5:00 | Porto, Portugal | |
| Loss | 2–1 | Artur Lemos | Submission (rear-naked choke) | Cage Fighters 3 | 28 July 2013 | 1 | 3:25 | Matosinhos, Portugal | |
| Win | 2–0 | Luis Veracruz | Submission (rear-naked choke) | Showfight 14 | 1 June 2013 | 1 | 2:59 | Estoril, Portugal | |
| Win | 1–0 | Edi Vicente | Submission (rear-naked choke) | World Ultimate Full Contact: 2012 Second Round | 15 September 2012 | 1 | N/A | Viseu, Portugal | Lightweight debut. |

== See also ==
- List of male mixed martial artists
