= Kai Kamaka III =

American mixed martial arts fighter

- Born: January 5, 1995 (age 31); Ewa Beach, Hawaii, U.S.
- Other names: The Fighting Hawaiian
- Height: 5 ft 7 in (1.70 m)
- Weight: 145 lb (66 kg; 10 st 5 lb)
- Division: Featherweight; Bantamweight; Lightweight
- Reach: 69 in (175 cm)
- Style: Wrestling
- Fighting out of: Las Vegas, Nevada, United States
- Team: 808 Fight Factory; Xtreme Couture (2020–present)
- Years active: 2012–present

Mixed martial arts record
- Total: 28
- Wins: 18
- By knockout: 3
- By submission: 1
- By decision: 14
- Losses: 9
- By knockout: 4
- By decision: 5
- Draws: 1

Other information
- University: Midland University
- Mixed martial arts record from Sherdog

Kai Kamaka III (born January 5, 1995) is an American mixed martial artist who competes in the lightweight and featherweight divisions of the Ultimate Fighting Championship (UFC). He has previously competed in the bantamweight and featherweight divisions and has fought for Bellator MMA and the Professional Fighters League (PFL).

== Background ==
Kai started training martial arts at the age of six under his father Kai Kamaka Jr., who owns the 808 Fight Factory in Hawaii. Kai has a brother named Tristin Kamaka who is a former University of Hawaii Football receiver. Kai attended Pearl City High School where he wrestled and eventually won the HHSAA State Championship after claiming gold in OIA conference finals. For his wrestling accolades, he received a wrestling scholarship to study at Midland University from where he graduated with a bachelor's degree.

== Mixed martial arts career ==
=== Early career ===
In his MMA debut at KOTC Mana, he faced Anthony Reyes and went on to defeat him via unanimous decision. Kamaka submitted Nui Wheeler at Destiny Na Koa 6 via rear-naked choke in the first round. After losing his next two bouts against Andrew Natividad and Jeff Mesa, at KOTC Energetic Pursuit, he defeated Rick James via unanimous decision. Kamaka defeated Mauricio Diaz via unanimous decision at KOTC Highlight Reel.

=== Bellator MMA / LFA ===
Kamaka faced Shojin Miki at Bellator 213 on December 15, 2018. He won the bout via unanimous decision.

Kamaka faced Spencer Higa at Bellator 236 on December 21, 2019. He won the bout via unanimous decision.

After winning a unanimous decision against Michael Stack at LFA 87 on July 31, 2020, he got the call to make his UFC debut on extremely short notice.

=== Ultimate Fighting Championship ===
Kamaka made his UFC debut against Tony Kelley at UFC 252 on August 15, 2020. He won the bout via unanimous decision. This bout earned him a Fight of the Night bonus award

Kamaka faced Jonathan Pearce at UFC on ESPN 18 on November 28, 2020. He lost the bout via TKO in the second round.

Kamaka faced T.J. Brown at UFC on ESPN 23 on May 1, 2021. He lost the bout via a controversial split decision. 15 out of 15 media members scored the bout for Kamaka.

Kamaka faced Danny Chavez, replacing injured Choi Doo-ho, on July 31, 2021 at UFC on ESPN 28. Kamaka was deducted a point in round two for an illegal groin strike, as a result the fight was ruled a majority draw. 11 out of 13 media outlets scored the bout as a win for Kamaka. The bout was the last of his contract and Kamaka decided to test free agency, parting with the UFC.

=== Return to Bellator MMA ===
On September 28, 2021, Kamaka signed a contract with Bellator to return to the promotion for the second time.

Kamaka, replacing Keoni Diggs, faced John de Jesus on December 3, 2021 at Bellator 272. He won the bout via unanimous decision.

Kamaka faced Justin Gonzales on April 23, 2022 at Bellator 279. He lost the close bout via split decision.

Kamaka was scheduled to face Akhmed Magomedov on July 22, 2022 at Bellator 283. Kamaka however pulled out of the bout for unknown reasons.

Kamaka faced Kevin Boehm on December 9, 2022 at Bellator 289. He won the fight via TKO in the third round.

Kamaka faced Adli Edwards on April 22, 2023 at Bellator 295. He won the bout via unanimous decision.

Kamaka was rebooked against Akhmed Magomedov on August 11, 2023 at Bellator 298. However, Magomedov pulled out of the bout a week before the event.

Kamaka faced Henry Corrales on October 7, 2023 at Bellator 300. He won the fight via split decision. 4 out of 4 media scores gave it to Corrales.

=== PFL ===
In his PFL debut, Kamaka faced Bubba Jenkins on April 19, 2024 at PFL 3 (2024). He won the bout via unanimous decision.

Kamaka next faced Pedro Carvalho at PFL 6 (2024) on June 28, 2024, winning the fight via unanimous decision.

Kamaka faced Brendan Loughnane in the semifinals of the 2024 Featherweight tournament on August 23, 2024 at PFL 9. He lost the fight by split decision.

=== Global Fight League ===
Kamaka was scheduled to face Mike Grundy on May 25, 2025 at GFL 2. However, all GFL events were cancelled indefinitely.

=== Return to UFC ===
After going 3–1 on the independent circuit following his PFL stint, Kamaka re-signed with the UFC and faced promotional newcomer Dakota Hope in his lightweight debut on April 4, 2026 at UFC Fight Night 272. He won the fight by split decision.

Kamaka returned to the featherweight division against Luke Riley on July 11, 2026 at UFC 329. He lost the fight by technical knockout in the first round.

Kamaka faced Andre Fili on October 10, 2026, at UFC Fight Night 290. He lost the fight by knockout via a head kick in the second round.

== Personal life ==
His cousin is Ray Cooper III who is PFL welterweight champion and also his cornerman. His uncle Ronal Jhun is a former UFC veteran.

Kamaka has known UFC matchmaker Sean Shelby, since his childhood when Sean was a camera man for MMA promotions in Hawaii.

== Championships and accomplishments ==
- Ultimate Fighting Championship
  - Fight of the Night (One time) vs. Tony Kelley

== Mixed martial arts record ==
Professional record breakdown
28 matches	18 wins	9 losses
By knockout	3	4
By submission	1	0
By decision	14	5
Draws	1	

Res.	Record	Opponent	Method	Event	Date	Round	Time	Location	Notes
Loss	18–9–1	Andre Fili	KO (head kick)	UFC Fight Night: Allen vs. Duncan	October 10, 2026	2	0:22	Las Vegas, Nevada, United States	
Loss	18–8–1	Luke Riley	TKO (knees and punches)	UFC 329	July 11, 2026	1	3:03	Las Vegas, Nevada, United States	Return to Featherweight.
Win	18–7–1	Dakota Hope	Decision (split)	UFC Fight Night: Moicano vs. Duncan	April 4, 2026	3	5:00	Las Vegas, Nevada, United States	Lightweight debut.
Win	17–7–1	Michel da Cruz Lima	KO (punch)	Tuff-N-Uff 151	January 22, 2026	3	4:48	Las Vegas, Nevada, United States	
Loss	16–7–1	Diego Brandão	Decision (split)	Tuff-N-Uff 149	October 25, 2025	5	5:00	Las Vegas, Nevada, United States	For the Tuff-N-Uff Featherweight Championship.
Win	16–6–1	Sitik Muduev	Decision (unanimous)	Tuff-N-Uff 145	June 29, 2025	3	5:00	Las Vegas, Nevada, United States	
Win	15–6–1	Joshua Weems	TKO (punches and elbows)	Tuff-N-Uff 143	April 25, 2025	2	0:58	Las Vegas, Nevada, United States	
Loss	14–6–1	Brendan Loughnane	Decision (split)	PFL 9 (2024)	August 23, 2024	3	5:00	Washington, D.C., United States	2024 PFL Featherweight Tournament Semifinal.
Win	14–5–1	Pedro Carvalho	Decision (unanimous)	PFL 6 (2024)	June 28, 2024	3	5:00	Sioux Falls, South Dakota, United States	
Win	13–5–1	Bubba Jenkins	Decision (unanimous)	PFL 3 (2024)	April 19, 2024	3	5:00	Chicago, Illinois, United States	
Win	12–5–1	Henry Corrales	Decision (split)	Bellator 300	October 7, 2023	3	5:00	San Diego, California, United States	
Win	11–5–1	Adli Edwards	Decision (unanimous)	Bellator 295	April 22, 2023	3	5:00	Honolulu, Hawaii, United States	
Win	10–5–1	Kevin Boehm	TKO (punches)	Bellator 289	December 9, 2022	3	2:23	Uncasville, Connecticut, United States	
Loss	9–5–1	Justin Gonzales	Decision (split)	Bellator 279	April 23, 2022	3	5:00	Honolulu, Hawaii, United States	
Win	9–4–1	John de Jesus	Decision (unanimous)	Bellator 272	December 3, 2021	3	5:00	Uncasville, Connecticut, United States	
Draw	8–4–1	Danny Chavez	Draw (majority)	UFC on ESPN: Hall vs. Strickland	July 31, 2021	3	5:00	Las Vegas, Nevada, United States	Kamaka was deducted one point in round 2 for an eye poke and a groin strike.
Loss	8–4	T.J. Brown	Decision (split)	UFC on ESPN: Reyes vs. Procházka	May 1, 2021	3	5:00	Las Vegas, Nevada, United States	
Loss	8–3	Jonathan Pearce	TKO (punches)	UFC on ESPN: Smith vs. Clark	November 28, 2020	2	4:28	Las Vegas, Nevada, United States	
Win	8–2	Tony Kelley	Decision (unanimous)	UFC 252	August 15, 2020	3	5:00	Las Vegas, Nevada, United States	Fight of the Night.
Win	7–2	Michael Stack	Decision (unanimous)	LFA 87	July 31, 2020	3	5:00	Sioux Falls, South Dakota, United States	
Win	6–2	Spencer Higa	Decision (unanimous)	Bellator 236	December 21, 2019	3	5:00	Honolulu, Hawaii, United States	Featherweight debut.
Win	5–2	Shojin Miki	Decision (unanimous)	Bellator 213	December 15, 2018	3	5:00	Honolulu, Hawaii, United States	
Win	4–2	Mauricio Diaz	Decision (unanimous)	KOTC: Highlight Reel	June 10, 2018	3	5:00	Ontario, California, United States	
Win	3–2	Rick James	Decision (unanimous)	KOTC: Energetic Pursuit	February 24, 2018	3	5:00	Ontario, California, United States	
Loss	2–2	Jeff Mesa	Decision (unanimous)	Pacific Xtreme Combat 56	March 25, 2017	3	5:00	Mangilao, Guam	
Loss	2–1	Andrew Natividad	TKO (doctor stoppage)	KOTC: Sanctioned	June 14, 2015	1	4:40	San Jacinto, California, United States	
Win	2–0	Nui Wheeler	Submission (rear-naked choke)	Destiny Na Koa 6	August 3, 2014	1	3:20	Honolulu, Hawaii, United States	
Win	1–0	Anthony Reyes	Decision (unanimous)	KOTC: Mana	October 20, 2012	2	5:00	Honolulu, Hawaii, United States	Bantamweight debut.

== See also ==
- List of current UFC fighters
- List of male mixed martial artists
