= Brett Johns =

Welsh mixed martial arts fighter (born 1992)

- Born: 21 February 1992 (age 34); Swansea, Wales
- Other names: The Pikey
- Height: 5 ft 7 in (170 cm)
- Weight: 145 lb (66 kg; 10 st 5 lb)
- Division: Lightweight; Featherweight; Bantamweight
- Reach: 71 in (180 cm)
- Fighting out of: Swansea, Wales
- Team: Chris Rees Academy (2008–2020); Shore MMA (2020–2025)
- Rank: Black belt in Judo; Brown belt in Muay Thai; Black belt in Brazilian Jiu-Jitsu under Chris Rees
- Years active: 2012–2025

Mixed martial arts record
- Total: 27
- Wins: 21
- By knockout: 4
- By submission: 7
- By decision: 10
- Losses: 6
- By knockout: 1
- By decision: 5

Other information
- Mixed martial arts record from Sherdog

Brett Johns (born 21 February 1992) is a Welsh former professional mixed martial artist who competed in the featherweight division. Johns has formerly competed for the Ultimate Fighting Championship (UFC), Bellator MMA and Professional Fighters League. A professional competitor since 2012, he has also formerly competed for Cage Warriors and Titan FC, and was Bantamweight Champion for both promotions.

== Early life ==
Johns was born and raised by a single mother in Pontarddulais. He has an older sister and two younger brothers. Brett started training judo in a club run by his to-be-stepfather at the age of four. While avidly training judo, he started training Brazilian jiu-jitsu on his stepfather's advice to improve his ground game at the age of 16. While training jiu-jitsu under Chris Rees, Johns eventually grew an interest towards mixed arts.

== Mixed martial arts career ==
=== Early career ===
Johns made his mixed martial arts debut as an amateur in 2011 where he compiled an undefeated record of 4–0. He turned professional in 2012 and competed on the regional circuit with stints in Cage Warriors Fighting Championship and Titan Fighting Championships where he was the Bantamweight Champion for each promotion.

Johns signed with the UFC in 2016.

=== Ultimate Fighting Championship ===
Johns made his promotional debut on 19 November 2016 against Kwan Ho Kwak at UFC Fight Night 99. He won the fight via unanimous decision.

Johns was expected to face Ian Entwistle on 18 March 2017 at UFC Fight Night 107. Entwistle missed weight at the weigh-ins – coming in at 139lbs, 3lbs over the bantamweight limit of 136lbs. He forfeited 20% of his fight purse to his opponent. The following day, Entwistle's medical clearance was revoked following a trip the hospital and the bout was cancelled.

Johns was expected to face Mitch Gagnon on 16 July 2017 at UFC Fight Night 113. However, Gagnon was removed from the card on 27 June and replaced by Albert Morales. Johns won the bout by unanimous decision.

Johns faced Joe Soto on 1 December 2017 at The Ultimate Fighter 26 Finale. Johns won the bout by submission due to a calf slicer (the 2nd Calf Slicer in UFC history). This win earned him Performance of the Night bonus.

Johns faced Aljamain Sterling on 21 April 2018 at UFC Fight Night 128. He lost the fight by unanimous decision.

Johns faced Pedro Munhoz on 4 August 2018 at UFC 227. He lost the fight by unanimous decision.

Johns faced Tony Gravely on 25 January 2020 at UFC Fight Night 166. He won the fight via a rear-naked choke in round three. This win earned him the Fight of the Night award.

Johns faced Montel Jackson on 19 July 2020 at UFC Fight Night 172. He won the fight via unanimous decision.

=== Bellator MMA ===
On 2 October 2020, Johns revealed he had signed a multi-fight deal with Bellator MMA after testing free agency when his UFC contract expired. Johns was expected to make his Bellator debut on 21 May 2021 at Bellator 259 against Matheus Mattos. However, Mattos pulled out from the bout after contracting COVID-19 and was replaced by former Titan FC bantamweight champion Danny Sabatello. Johns lost the bout via unanimous decision.

Johns was scheduled to face Erik Pérez on 16 October 2021 at Bellator 268. However on 5 October it was announced that Pérez was injured and the bout was scrapped.

Johns faced Khurshed Kakhorov on 25 February 2022 at Bellator 275. He won the bout via ground and pound TKO in the third round.

Johns was scheduled to face James Gallagher on 23 September 2022 at Bellator 285. However in August, it was announced that Gallagher pulled out of the bout for unknown reasons. Jordan Winski was picked as a replacement for Gallagher. Johns won the bout via unanimous decision.

Johns was scheduled to face Marcirley Alves on 12 May 2023 at Bellator 296. However, the week of the event, Johns pulled out due to staph infection.

=== Professional Fighters League ===
After completing his contract, Johns signed with the PFL and made his debut against David Tonatiuh Crol on 8 December 2023 at PFL Europe 4. He won the fight by TKO in the third round.

Johns faced Timur Khizriev on 19 April 2024 at PFL 3 (2024). He lost the bout via unanimous decision.

Johns was scheduled to face Ádám Borics on 28 June 2024 at PFL 6, but Borics pulled out and was replaced by Tyler Diamond. He lost the fight via unanimous decision.

== Championships and accomplishments ==
=== Mixed martial arts ===
- Ultimate Fighting Championship
  - Performance of the Night (One time) vs. Joe Soto
  - Fight of the Night (One time) vs. Tony Gravely
  - UFC.com Awards
    - 2017: Ranked #3 Submission of the Year vs. Joe Soto
- Titan FC
  - Titan FC Bantamweight Championship (one time; former)
- Cage Warriors
  - CWFC Bantamweight Championship (one time; former)
- Pain Pit Fight Night
  - PPFN Bantamweight (145 lbs) Championship
- MMA Mania
  - UFC/MMA 'Submission of the Year' 2017 – Top 5 List No. 4 vs. Joe Soto at The Ultimate Fighter: A New World Champion Finale
- MMADNA.nl
  - 2017 Submission of the Year vs. Joe Soto at The Ultimate Fighter: A New World Champion Finale
- MMA Junkie
  - 2017 #2 Ranked Submission of the Year vs. Joe Soto at The Ultimate Fighter: A New World Champion Finale

== Mixed martial arts record ==
Professional record breakdown
27 matches	21 wins	6 losses
By knockout	4	1
By submission	7	0
By decision	10	5

Res.	Record	Opponent	Method	Event	Date	Round	Time	Location	Notes
Loss	21–6	Nikolay Grozdev	TKO (punches)	WOW 25	December 13, 2025	2	0:26	Madrid, Spain	For the WOW Featherweight Championship.
Win	21–5	Levan Kirtadze	Submission (kneebar)	WOW 21	August 9, 2025	1	2:59	Marbella, Spain	
Loss	20–5	Tyler Diamond	Decision (unanimous)	PFL 6 (2024)	28 June 2024	3	5:00	Sioux Falls, South Dakota, United States	
Loss	20–4	Timur Khizriev	Decision (unanimous)	PFL 3 (2024)	19 April 2024	3	5:00	Chicago, Illinois, United States	
Win	20–3	David Tonatiuh Crol	TKO (punches)	PFL Europe 4 (2023)	8 December 2023	3	3:09	Dublin, Ireland	Return to Featherweight.
Win	19–3	Jordan Winski	Decision (unanimous)	Bellator 285	23 September 2022	3	5:00	Dublin, Ireland	
Win	18–3	Khurshed Kakhorov	TKO (punches)	Bellator 275	25 February 2022	3	3:00	Dublin, Ireland	
Loss	17–3	Danny Sabatello	Decision (unanimous)	Bellator 259	21 May 2021	3	5:00	Uncasville, Connecticut, United States	
Win	17–2	Montel Jackson	Decision (unanimous)	UFC Fight Night: Figueiredo vs. Benavidez 2	19 July 2020	3	5:00	Abu Dhabi, United Arab Emirates	
Win	16–2	Tony Gravely	Submission (rear-naked choke)	UFC Fight Night: Blaydes vs. dos Santos	25 January 2020	3	2:53	Raleigh, North Carolina, United States	Fight of the Night
Loss	15–2	Pedro Munhoz	Decision (unanimous)	UFC 227	4 August 2018	3	5:00	Los Angeles, California, United States	
Loss	15–1	Aljamain Sterling	Decision (unanimous)	UFC Fight Night: Barboza vs. Lee	21 April 2018	3	5:00	Atlantic City, New Jersey, United States	
Win	15–0	Joe Soto	Submission (calf slicer)	The Ultimate Fighter: A New World Champion Finale	1 December 2017	1	0:30	Las Vegas, Nevada, United States	Performance of the Night
Win	14–0	Albert Morales	Decision (unanimous)	UFC Fight Night: Nelson vs. Ponzinibbio	16 July 2017	3	5:00	Glasgow, Scotland	
Win	13–0	Kwak Kwan-ho	Decision (unanimous)	UFC Fight Night: Mousasi vs. Hall 2	19 November 2016	3	5:00	Belfast, Northern Ireland	
Win	12–0	Anthony Gutierrez	Decision (split)	Titan FC 34	18 July 2015	5	5:00	Kansas City, Missouri, United States	Johns missed weight (136.8 lb) and was stripped of the Titan FC Bantamweight Championship. Only Gutierrez was eligible to win the title.
Win	11–0	Walel Watson	Submission (rear-naked choke)	Titan FC 33	20 March 2015	2	3:06	Mobile, Alabama, United States	Won the Titan FC Bantamweight Championship.
Win	10–0	James Brum	Decision (unanimous)	Cage Warriors FC 67	12 April 2014	5	5:00	Swansea, Wales	Johns missed weight (137 lb) and was stripped of the Cage Warriors Bantamweight Championship. Only Brum was eligible to win the title.
Win	9–0	Jordan Desborough	Decision (split)	Cage Warriors 59	14 September 2013	5	5:00	Cardiff, Wales	Won the Cage Warriors Bantamweight Tournament and the vacant Cage Warriors Bantamweight Championship.
Win	8–0	David Haggstrom	Decision (unanimous)	Cage Warriors 59	14 September 2013	3	5:00	Cardiff, Wales	Cage Warriors Bantamweight Tournament Semifinal.
Win	7–0	James MacCallister	TKO (punches)	Cage Warriors 54	4 May 2013	2	3:23	Cardiff, Wales	Bantamweight debut
Win	6–0	Joe Orrey	Submission (armbar)	Pain Pit Fight Night 6	3 February 2013	1	3:59	Newport, Wales	Won the PPFN Bantamweight (145 lb) Championship.
Win	5–0	Barrie Monty	TKO (punches)	Bad Blood Fight Night 2	24 November 2012	1	1:17	Llanelli, Wales	
Win	4–0	Sam Gilbert	Decision (unanimous)	Cage Warriors 49	27 October 2012	3	5:00	Cardiff, Wales	
Win	3–0	Kyle Prosser	Decision (unanimous)	Pain Pit Fight Night 4	1 September 2012	3	5:00	Newport, Wales	Featherweight debut
Win	2–0	Arunis Klimavicius	Submission (triangle choke)	Celtic Battle Fight Night	14 July 2012	1	2:31	Carmarthen, Wales	
Win	1–0	Ben Wood	Submission (rear-naked choke)	Pain Pit Fight Night 3	30 June 2012	1	2:04	Newport, Wales	Lightweight debut

== See also ==
- List of current PFL fighters
- List of male mixed martial artists
