= Zenzeli =

Zenzeli Зензели
- Selo
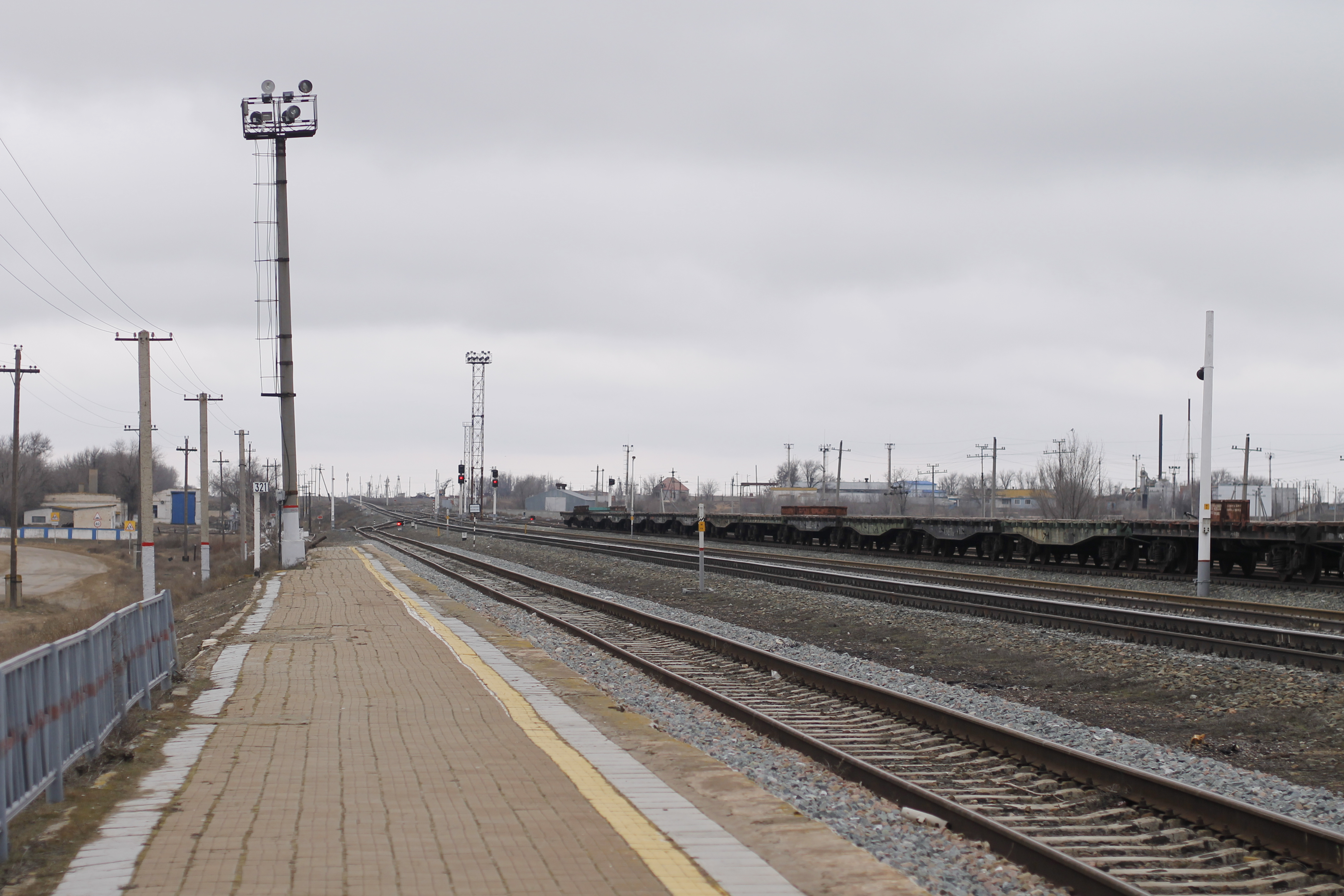

- Location within Astrakhan Oblast Location within Russia
- Coordinates: 45°56′N 47°03′E
- Country: Russia
- Region: Astrakhan Oblast
- District: Limansky District
- Time zone: UTC+4:00

Zenzeli (Russian: Зензели) is a rural locality (a selo) and the administrative center of Zenzelinsky Selsoviet, Limansky District, Astrakhan Oblast, Russia. The population was 3,198 as of 2010. There are 33 streets.

== Geography ==
Zenzeli is located 25 km northwest of Liman (the district's administrative centre) by road. Mikhaylovka is the nearest rural locality.

== World War II ==
Reconnaissance units from the German 16th Motorized Infantry Division reached Zenzeli in September of 1942. This was one of the furthest locations east reached by German forces.
