= Brennan Ward =

American MMA fighter (born 1998)

- Born: June 28, 1988 (age 38); New London, Connecticut, United States
- Other names: Irish
- Nationality: American
- Height: 5 ft 11 in (180 cm)
- Weight: 170 lb (77 kg; 12 st 2 lb)
- Division: Middleweight; Welterweight
- Reach: 71 in (180 cm)
- Stance: Orthodox
- Fighting out of: Waterford, Connecticut, United States
- Team: Whaling City Boxing; Rivera Athletic Center
- Wrestling: NCAA Division III Wrestling
- Years active: 2008, 2012–2017, 2022-2024

Mixed martial arts record
- Total: 26
- Wins: 17
- By knockout: 12
- By submission: 4
- By decision: 1
- Losses: 9
- By knockout: 3
- By submission: 6

Other information
- University: Johnson & Wales University; Colby Community College
- Notable school: Waterford High School
- Mixed martial arts record from Sherdog

Brennan Ward (born June 28, 1988) is a former American professional mixed martial artist and current Bare Knuckle Boxer who most recently competed in Bare Knuckle Fighting Championship. A professional competitor since 2008, Ward formerly competed for CES MMA, Bellator MMA and was the Bellator Season Nine Middleweight Tournament Winner.

== Background ==
Ward was born in New London, Connecticut, and raised in Waterford, Connecticut. Ward's father, Kent, owns a boxing gym, Whaling City Boxing (New London), where Ward began training from a young age. He competed in wrestling at Waterford High School, graduating in 2006, before continuing his career at Colby Community College. Ward later transferred to Johnson & Wales University, which has a Division III program. At Johnson & Wales, Ward demonstrated his talents, earning All-American honors and was also the runner-up in the nation for his weight class, after winning the New England title.

== Mixed martial arts career ==
=== Early career ===
Ward started his professional career in 2008, but only became active in 2012. He fought mainly for Rhode Island's promotion Classic Entertainment and Sports (CES MMA).

With a record of 5 and 0, Ward signed with Bellator.

=== Bellator MMA ===
Ward was expected to make his debut against Valter Roberto on November 16, 2012, at Bellator 81. However, Roberto was replaced by Sam McCoy due to undisclosed reasons. Ward won via KO in the very first round.

Ward faced Aaron Johnson on February 14, 2013, at Bellator 89. He had his first career's defeat via submission at 15 seconds of round one.

Ward was expected to face Vadiano La Luz on February 28, 2013, at Bellator 91. However, La Luz was replaced by Yair Moguel due to undisclosed reasons. Ward won via submission due to a rear-naked choke in the first round.

Ward was expected to face Dave Vitkay on September 7, 2013, at Bellator 98. However, he was called to replace Andreas Spång against Justin Torrey in the quarterfinal match of Bellator Season Nine Middleweight Tournament at the same event. Ward won via TKO in the second round and advanced to the semifinal.

Ward was expected to face Perry Filkins in the semifinal on October 4, 2013, at Bellator 102. Filkins, however, was injured and replaced by Joe Pacheco. Ward won the fight via submission in the second round.

Ward faced Mikkel Parlo in the finals on November 8, 2013, at Bellator 107. He won the fight via TKO due to punches in the second round.

Ward faced Bellator Middleweight Champion Alexander Shlemenko at Bellator 114 on March 28, 2014. Despite doing well in the first round, Ward lost the bout due to a submission early in the second round.

Ward was expected to face James Irvin at Bellator 123 on September 5, 2014, however, the bout was cancelled for unknown reasons. Ward instead faced Tamdan McCrory on the same card. Ward lost the bout via knockout in the first round.

Ward was expected to make his Welterweight debut against Jesse Juarez on February 27, 2015, at Bellator 134. However, Ward has been moved up to the main card to face Curtis Millender after Millender's opponent, Michael Page, pulled out of the fight due to a cut over his left eye. Ward defeated Millender via submission in the first round.

Ward was expected to face English fighter Gavin Sterritt at Bellator 140 on July 17, 2015. However, a week before the fight, his opponent was changed to Roger Carroll. Ward won the fight via knockout in the first round.

Ward next faced Dennis Olson at Bellator 144 on October 23, 2015. He won the fight via KO in the first round.

Ward made his international MMA debut on December 31, 2015, as a Bellator MMA representative at Rizin Fighting Federation 2. He faced Ken Hasegawa in a 179-pound catchweight bout and won the fight via submission in the second round.

On March 1, 2016, it was announced that Ward would face Strikeforce vet Evangelista Santos on April 22, 2016, at Bellator 153. He lost the fight via heel hook submission in the first round.

Ward next faced Saad Awad at Bellator 163 on November 4, 2016. He won the fight via knockout in the first round.

Ward made a quick return to the cage, facing Paul Daley in the co-main event at Bellator 170 on January 21, 2017. He lost the fight due to a flying knee in the first round.

Ward faced Fernando Gonzalez at Bellator 182 on August 25, 2017. He lost the fight via a guillotine choke submission in the third round.

Ward was expected to face David Rickels at Bellator 185 on October 20, 2017. Ward pulled out of the fight due to an injury and, as a result, Rickels was removed from the fight card.

After a 15-month layoff, Ward was scheduled to face Andre Fialho on October 12, 2018, at Bellator 207. However on September 10, 2018, Ward notified the promotion that he will retire from MMA.

=== Bare-knuckle boxing ===
On April 8, 2019, Bare Knuckle FC president David Feldman announced that Ward had signed a contract with the organization.

Ward was expected to face former UFC Welterweight champion Johny Hendricks at World Bare Knuckle Fighting Federation's inaugural event on November 9, 2018. During the fight week, Ward announced that he wouldn't be fighting at the event due to a contract dispute.

On December 20, 2024, it was announced that Ward had signed with the Bare Knuckle Fighting Championship (BKFC).

Ward faced James Dennis on February 1, 2025 at BKFC on DAZN 4. He won the fight by knockout in the first round.

Ward faced JR Rumsley on June 14, 2025 at BKFC Fight Night 26. He lost the fight by technical knockout in the third round.

=== Return to Bellator MMA ===
Ward battled with drug addiction throughout his career and after spending time in jail Ward decided to attend rehab and get sober. His first mixed martial arts bout in four and a half years took place at Bellator 274 on February 19, 2022, against Brandon Bell. He won the bout in dominant fashion, finishing Bell in the second round via technical knockout.

On April 15, 2022, it was announced that Ward signed a multi-fight contract with Bellator.

Ward's next bout in Bellator was at Bellator 282 on June 24, 2022, against Kassius Kayne. He won the bout via TKO stoppage in the second round.

Ward faced Sabah Homasi on February 4, 2023, at Bellator 290. Ward won by technical knockout in the second round, after dropping Homasi with a head kick and finishing the bout with ground and pound.

Ward faced Logan Storley on August 11, 2023, at Bellator 298. He lost the fight via TKO in the second round.It was later revealed that Brennan Ward was severely injured going into the Storley fight, having sustained a torn bicep tendon, as well as a torn UCL ligament in his left arm three weeks before the fight, essentially leaving him with one arm during the entire fight. Brennan's youngest daughter had also just recently been born, complicating his training. Despite this, Brennan insisted on fighting saying "In my younger days, I might've pulled out of that fight. But it was the main event, fighting Logan in his hometown, I know that I had a puncher's chance with my right hand...and I went out there and fought, 'cause that's what I do bro" "But I was not, I was probably about forty percent of myself during that fight"

=== Professional Fighters League ===
Ward participated in the 2024 PFL season in the Welterweight division, facing Don Madge at PFL 3 on April 19, 2024. He lost the fight via a rear-naked choke submission in the first round.

Ward next faced Magomed Umalatov at PFL 6 (2024) on June 28, 2024 at Sanford Pentagon stadium in Sioux Falls, South Dakota. He lost the fight via an anaconda choke submission in the first round. Ward subsequently retired from MMA competition after the bout.

== Personal life ==
On October 24, 2016, at approximately 7:00 pm, Ward rescued a baby trapped in a stroller abandoned along a busy New London road. The baby was subsequently taken to a nearby fire department – and later hospital – where she was determined to be without injury.

== Controversies ==
On July 4, 2016, at approximately 12:10 pm, Ward was arrested by the Waterford Police Department on the charges of breach of peace, interfering with a police officer, threatening a public safety officer, and assault on a public safety officer. According to the police report, an inebriated Ward got into an altercation with his female companion (who was also arrested for breach of peace) and subsequently resisted arrest by physically and verbally assaulting the officers present. Officers were also unable to process Ward at the time of his arrest due to his continued belligerence as he repeatedly banged his head on the Plexiglas divider of the squad car and “continued extreme aggression” in his jail cell. Ward proceeded to call three of the four policemen by their first names as well as threatened them and their families. Police also noted that Ward urinated all over the floor and door of his jail cell. He was released on a $100,000 bond and is scheduled to appear in court on August 16, 2016. In December 2019, news surfaced that Ward was sentenced to 120 days in prison and is expected to be released early 2020.

Ward also had a pending case from a January 3, 2014, incident, where he was charged with disobeying the signal of a police officer, reckless driving, and interfering with a police officer.

== Championships and accomplishments ==
=== Amateur wrestling ===
- National Collegiate Athletic Association
  - NCAA Division III All-American out of Johnson & Wales University (2010)
  - NCAA Division III 184 lb: Runner-up out of Johnson & Wales University (2010)
- New England Wrestling Association
  - NEWA Championship 184 lb: Champion out of Johnson & Wales University (2011)
- Ithaca College Athletics
  - Ithaca College Invitational 184 lb: Champion out of Johnson & Wales University (2009)
  - Ithaca College Invitational 197 lb: 3rd place out of Johnson & Wales University (2010)

=== Mixed martial arts ===
- Bellator MMA
  - Bellator Season Nine Middleweight Tournament Winner

== Mixed martial arts record ==
Professional record breakdown
26 matches	17 wins	9 losses
By knockout	12	3
By submission	4	6
By decision	1	0

Res.	Record	Opponent	Method	Event	Date	Round	Time	Location	Notes
Loss	17–9	Magomed Umalatov	Submission (anaconda choke)	PFL 6 (2024)	June 28, 2024	1	3:43	Sioux Falls, South Dakota, United States	
Loss	17–8	Don Madge	Submission (rear-naked choke)	PFL 3 (2024)	April 19, 2024	1	1:02	Chicago, Illinois, United States	
Loss	17–7	Logan Storley	TKO (punches)	Bellator 298	August 11, 2023	2	4:05	Sioux Falls, South Dakota, United States	
Win	17–6	Sabah Homasi	TKO (head kick and punches)	Bellator 290	February 4, 2023	2	1:34	Inglewood, California, United States	
Win	16–6	Kassius Kayne	TKO (punches)	Bellator 282	June 24, 2022	2	1:11	Uncasville, Connecticut, United States	
Win	15–6	Brandon Bell	TKO (punches)	Bellator 274	February 19, 2022	2	0:32	Uncasville, Connecticut, United States	Catchweight (175 lb) bout.
Loss	14–6	Fernando Gonzalez	Submission (guillotine choke)	Bellator 182	August 25, 2017	3	1:02	Verona, New York, United States	Catchweight (180 lb) bout; Gonzalez missed weight.
Loss	14–5	Paul Daley	KO (flying knee)	Bellator 170	January 21, 2017	1	2:27	Inglewood, California, United States	
Win	14–4	Saad Awad	KO (punches)	Bellator 163	November 4, 2016	1	1:26	Uncasville, Connecticut, United States	
Loss	13–4	Evangelista Santos	Submission (heel hook)	Bellator 153	April 22, 2016	1	0:30	Uncasville, Connecticut, United States	
Win	13–3	Ken Hasegawa	Submission (rear-naked choke)	Rizin World Grand Prix 2015: Part 2 - Iza	December 31, 2015	2	1:52	Saitama, Japan	Catchweight (179 lb) bout.
Win	12–3	Dennis Olson	KO (punches)	Bellator 144	October 23, 2015	1	4:37	Uncasville, Connecticut, United States	
Win	11–3	Roger Carroll	KO (punch)	Bellator 140	July 17, 2015	1	2:06	Uncasville, Connecticut, United States	
Win	10–3	Curtis Millender	Submission (rear-naked choke)	Bellator 134	February 27, 2015	1	1:39	Uncasville, Connecticut, United States	Welterweight debut.
Loss	9–3	Tamdan McCrory	KO (punches)	Bellator 123	September 5, 2014	1	0:21	Uncasville, Connecticut, United States	
Loss	9–2	Alexander Shlemenko	Submission (guillotine choke)	Bellator 114	March 28, 2014	2	1:22	West Valley City, Utah, United States	For the Bellator Middleweight World Championship.
Win	9–1	Mikkel Parlo	TKO (punches)	Bellator 107	November 8, 2013	2	1:39	Thackerville, Oklahoma, United States	Bellator Season Nine Middleweight Tournament Final.
Win	8–1	Joe Pacheco	Submission (guillotine choke)	Bellator 102	October 4, 2013	2	2:41	Visalia, California, United States	Bellator Season Nine Middleweight Tournament Semifinal.
Win	7–1	Justin Torrey	TKO (punches)	Bellator 98	September 7, 2013	2	3:28	Uncasville, Connecticut, United States	Bellator Season Nine Middleweight Tournament Quarterfinal.
Win	6–1	Yair Moguel	Submission (rear-naked choke)	Bellator 91	February 28, 2013	1	0:57	Rio Rancho, New Mexico, United States	Catchweight (187 lbs) bout; Moguel missed weight.
Loss	5–1	Aaron Johnson	Submission (armbar)	Bellator 89	February 14, 2013	1	0:15	Charlotte, North Carolina, United States	
Win	5–0	Sam McCoy	KO (punches)	Bellator 81	November 16, 2012	1	2:49	Kingston, Rhode Island, United States	
Win	4–0	Shedrick Goodridge	TKO (punches)	CES MMA: Real Pain	October 6, 2012	1	2:36	Providence, Rhode Island, United States	Catchweight (188 lbs) bout.
Win	3–0	Harley Beekman	Decision (unanimous)	CES MMA: Never Surrender	April 13, 2012	3	5:00	Lincoln, Rhode Island, United States	
Win	2–0	Brennan Scholz	TKO (punches)	CES MMA: Extreme Measures	February 3, 2012	1	1:32	Lincoln, Rhode Island, United States	Catchweight (190 lb) bout.
Win	1–0	Mike Manna	TKO (punches)	USFL: War in the Woods 2	February 23, 2008	1	2:15	Ledyard, Connecticut, United States	

== Bareknuckle boxing record ==
Professional record breakdown
2 matches	1 win	1 loss
By knockout	1	1

Res.	Record	Opponent	Method	Event	Date	Round	Time	Location	Notes
Loss	1–1	JR Rumsley	TKO (Doctor's stoppage)	BKFC Fight Night Mohegan Sun: Porter vs. Cleckler	June 14, 2025	3	0:34	Uncasville, Connecticut, United States	
Win	1–0	James Dennis	KO (punch)	BKFC on DAZN Mohegan Sun: Lane vs. VanCamp	February 1, 2025	1	0:38	Uncasville, Connecticut, United States	
