= PFL 3 (2024) =

Professional Fighters League MMA event in 2023

- The poster for PFL 3
- Promotion: Professional Fighters League
- Date: April 19, 2024
- Venue: Wintrust Arena
- City: Chicago, Illinois, United States

Event chronology
| PFL 2 | PFL 3 | PFL MENA 1 |

The PFL 3 mixed martial arts event for the 2024 season of the Professional Fighters League was held on April 19, 2024, at the Wintrust Arena in Chicago, Illinois, United States. This marked the third regular-season event of the tournament and included fights in the Featherweight and Welterweight divisions.

== Background ==
The event marked the promotion's second visit to Chicago and first since PFL 2 (2018) in June 2018.

The event was headlined by a welterweight bout between former Bellator Welterweight Champion Andrey Koreshkov and Magomed Umalatov.

The undercard also included the regular season, with the following fights took place at the event:

- A featherweight bout between 2022 PFL featherweight winner Brendan Loughnane and Pedro Carvalho.
- A welterweight bout between former interim Bellator Welterweight Champion Logan Storley and Shamil Musaev.
- A featherweight bout between Gabriel Alves Braga and former LFA Featherweight Champion Justin Gonzalez.
- A welterweight rematch between Neiman Gracie and Goiti Yamauchi.
- A featherweight bout between former Brave CF Featherweight Champion Bubba Jenkins and Kai Kamaka III.
- The Ultimate Fighter: Latin America 2 lightweight winner Enrique Barzola was return to featherweight division against Ádám Borics.
- A featherweight bout between Timur Khizriev and Brett Johns.
- Murad Ramazanov made his promotional debut against Laureano Staropoli in a welterweight bout. At weigh-ins, Staropoli came in at 175.2 lbs, 4.2 pounds over the limit for welterweight. He was fined 20% of his purse and given a point deduction in the standings.
- Don Madge returned after two-years hiatus against Brennan Ward in a welterweight bout.

== Results ==
Main card (ESPN / ESPN+)
| Weight class | | | | Method | Round | Time | Notes |
|---|---|---|---|---|---|---|---|
| Welterweight | Magomed Umalatov | def. | Andrey Koreshkov | Decision (unanimous) (29–28, 29–28, 29–28) | 3 | 5:00 |
| Featherweight | Brendan Loughnane | def. | Pedro Carvalho | TKO (punches) | 1 | 1:26 |
| Welterweight | Shamil Musaev | def. | Logan Storley | KO (punches) | 2 | 0:27 |
| Featherweight | Gabriel Alves Braga | def. | Justin Gonzalez | KO (punch) | 1 | 4:59 |
| Welterweight | Goiti Yamauchi | def. | Neiman Gracie | Decision (unanimous) (29–28, 29–28, 29–28) | 3 | 5:00 |
| Featherweight | Kai Kamaka III | def. | Bubba Jenkins | Decision (unanimous) (29–28, 29–28, 29–28) | 3 | 5:00 |
Preliminary card (ESPN+)
| Featherweight | Ádám Borics | def. | Enrique Barzola | Decision (unanimous) (29–28, 29–28, 29–28) | 3 | 5:00 |
| Featherweight | Timur Khizriev | def. | Brett Johns | Decision (unanimous) (30–27, 30–27, 30–27) | 3 | 5:00 |
| Welterweight | Murad Ramazanov | def. | Laureano Staropoli | Submission (rear-naked choke) | 1 | 4:06 | (Note: Staropoli missed weight (175.2 lb).) |
| Welterweight | Don Madge | def. | Brennan Ward | Submission (rear-naked choke) | 1 | 1:02 |
| Featherweight | Tyler Diamond | def. | Otto Rodrigues | Decision (unanimous) (30–26, 30–26, 30–27) | 3 | 5:00 | (Note: Featherweight Season Alternate Bout) |
| Welterweight | Thad Jean | def. | Romain Debienne | KO (punches) | 1 | 2:07 |

== Standings after event ==
The PFL points system is based on results of the match. The winner of a fight receives 3 points. If the fight ends in a draw, both fighters will receive 1 point. The bonus for winning a fight in the first, second, or third round is 3 points, 2 points, and 1 point respectively. The bonus for winning in the third round requires a fight be stopped before 4:59 of the third round. No bonus point will be awarded if a fighter wins via decision. For example, if a fighter wins a fight in the first round, then the fighter will receive 6 total points. A decision win will result in three total points. If a fighter misses weight, the opponent (should they comply with weight limits) will receive 3 points due to a walkover victory, regardless of winning or losing the bout; if the non-offending fighter subsequently wins with a stoppage, all bonus points will be awarded.

=== Welterweight ===
| Fighter | Wins | Draws | Losses | 1st | 2nd | 3rd | Total Points (Note: The four fighters with most points advance to the playoffs) |
|---|---|---|---|---|---|---|---|
| (South Africa) Don Madge | 1 | 0 | 0 | 1 | 0 | 0 | 6 |
| (Russia) Murad Ramazanov | 1 | 0 | 0 | 1 | 0 | 0 | 6 |
| (Russia) Shamil Musaev | 1 | 0 | 0 | 0 | 1 | 0 | 5 |
| (Russia) Magomed Umalatov | 1 | 0 | 0 | 0 | 0 | 0 | 3 |
| (Brazil) Goiti Yamauchi | 1 | 0 | 0 | 0 | 0 | 0 | 3 |
| (Brazil) Neiman Gracie | 0 | 0 | 1 | 0 | 0 | 0 | 0 |
| (Russia) Andrey Koreshkov | 0 | 0 | 1 | 0 | 0 | 0 | 0 |
| (United States) Logan Storley | 0 | 0 | 1 | 0 | 0 | 0 | 0 |
| (United States) Brennan Ward | 0 | 0 | 1 | 0 | 0 | 0 | 0 |
| (Argentina) Laureano Staropoli | 0 | 0 | 1 | 0 | 0 | 0 | -1 |

=== Featherweight ===
| Fighter | Wins | Draws | Losses | 1st | 2nd | 3rd | Total Points (Note: The four fighters with most points advance to the playoffs) |
|---|---|---|---|---|---|---|---|
| (England) Brendan Loughnane | 1 | 0 | 0 | 1 | 0 | 0 | 6 |
| (Brazil) Gabriel Alves Braga | 1 | 0 | 0 | 1 | 0 | 0 | 6 |
| (Russia) Timur Khizriev | 1 | 0 | 0 | 0 | 0 | 0 | 3 |
| (Hungary) Ádám Borics | 1 | 0 | 0 | 0 | 0 | 0 | 3 |
| (United States) Kai Kamaka III | 1 | 0 | 0 | 0 | 0 | 0 | 3 |
| (United States) Bubba Jenkins | 0 | 0 | 1 | 0 | 0 | 0 | 0 |
| (Peru) Enrique Barzola | 0 | 0 | 1 | 0 | 0 | 0 | 0 |
| (Wales) Brett Johns | 0 | 0 | 1 | 0 | 0 | 0 | 0 |
| (United States) Justin Gonzalez | 0 | 0 | 1 | 0 | 0 | 0 | 0 |
| (Portugal) Pedro Carvalho | 0 | 0 | 1 | 0 | 0 | 0 | 0 |

== See also ==
- List of PFL events
- List of current PFL fighters
