= 2024 in Professional Fighters League =

Information
- First date: February 24, 2024
- Last date: December 14, 2024

Events
- Total events: 19

Fights
- Total fights: 217
- Title fights: 14

This is a list of events and standings for the Professional Fighters League, a mixed martial arts organization based in the United States, for the 2024 season.

== Background ==
In January 2024, PFL announced that it would discontinue it's Women's Featherweight division – which had existed in the tournament format since 2018 season – and replace it with the Women's Flyweight division. Following to PFL's acquisition of Bellator MMA in late 2023, some of the Bellator fighters are scheduled to take part in the 2024 tournaments.

== Events ==
#	Event	Date	Venue	Location
19	PFL Europe 4	December 14, 2024	LDLC Arena	Lyon, France
18	PFL 10	November 29, 2024	King Saud University Stadium	Riyadh, Saudi Arabia
17	PFL Super Fights: Battle of the Giants	October 19, 2024	The Mayadeen	Riyadh, Saudi Arabia
16	PFL Europe 3	September 28, 2024	OVO Hydro	Glasgow, Scotland
15	PFL MENA 3	September 20, 2024	Boulevard City	Riyadh, Saudi Arabia
14	PFL 9	August 23, 2024	The Anthem	Washington, D.C., United States
13	PFL 8	August 16, 2024	Seminole Hard Rock Hotel & Casino Hollywood	Hollywood, Florida, United States
12	PFL 7	August 2, 2024	Nashville Municipal Auditorium	Nashville, Tennessee, United States
11	PFL MENA 2	July 12, 2024	The Green Halls	Riyadh, Saudi Arabia
10	PFL 6	June 28, 2024	Sanford Pentagon	Sioux Falls, South Dakota, United States
9	PFL 5	June 21, 2024	Jon M. Huntsman Center	Salt Lake City, Utah, United States
8	PFL 4	June 13, 2024	Mohegan Sun Arena	Uncasville, Connecticut, United States
7	PFL Europe 2	June 8, 2024	Utilita Arena Newcastle	Newcastle, England
6	PFL MENA 1	May 10, 2024	The Green Halls	Riyadh, Saudi Arabia
5	PFL 3	April 19, 2024	Wintrust Arena	Chicago, Illinois, United States
4	PFL 2	April 12, 2024	The Theater at Virgin Hotels	Las Vegas, Nevada, United States
3	PFL 1	April 4, 2024	Boeing Center at Tech Port	San Antonio, Texas, United States
2	PFL Europe 1	March 7, 2024	Accor Arena	Paris, France
1	PFL vs. Bellator	February 24, 2024	Kingdom Arena	Riyadh, Saudi Arabia

== 2024 Tournament winners ==
=== 2024 PFL Tournament ===
Event	Date	Division	Winner	Runner-up
PFL 10 (2024)	Nov 29, 2024	Heavyweight	(Russia) Denis Goltsov	(Russia) Oleg Popov
PFL 10 (2024)	Nov 29, 2024	Light Heavyweight	(Turkmenistan) Dovletdzhan Yagshimuradov	(United States) Impa Kasanganay
PFL 10 (2024)	Nov 29, 2024	Welterweight	(Russia) Shamil Musaev	(Russia) Magomed Umalatov
PFL 10 (2024)	Nov 29, 2024	Lightweight	(Russia) Gadzhi Rabadanov	(United States) Brent Primus
PFL 10 (2024)	Nov 29, 2024	Featherweight	(Russia) Timur Khizriev	(England) Brendan Loughnane
PFL 10 (2024)	Nov 29, 2024	Women's Flyweight	(England) Dakota Ditcheva	(Brazil) Taila Santos

=== 2024 PFL Europe Tournament ===
Event	Date	Division	Winner	Runner-up
PFL Europe 4 (2024)	Dec 14, 2024	Welterweight	(Albania) Florim Zendeli	(Italy) Daniele Miceli
PFL Europe 4 (2024)	Dec 14, 2024	Lightweight	(Poland) Jakub Kaszuba	(England) Connor Hughes
PFL Europe 4 (2024)	Dec 14, 2024	Bantamweight	(England) Lewis McGrillen-Evans	(Germany) Alexander Luster
PFL Europe 4 (2024)	Dec 14, 2024	Women's Flyweight	(Poland) Paulina Wiśniewska	(Italy) Valentina Scatizzi

=== 2024 PFL MENA Tournament ===
Event	Date	Division	Winner	Runner-up
PFL 10 (2024)	Nov 29, 2024	Welterweight	(Egypt) Omar El-Dafrawy	(Kuwait) Mohammad Alaqraa
PFL 10 (2024)	Nov 29, 2024	Lightweight	(Iran) Mohsen Mohammadseifi	(Lebanon) Georges Eid
PFL 10 (2024)	Nov 29, 2024	Featherweight	(Saudi Arabia) Abdullah Al-Qahtani	(Morocco) Maraoune Bellagouit
PFL 10 (2024)	Nov 29, 2024	Bantamweight	(Iraq) Ali Taleb	(Morocco) Rachid El Hazoume

== Format ==
The PFL points system is based on results of the match. The winner of a fight receives 3 points. If the fight ends in a draw, both fighters will receive 1 point. A no-contest will be scored as a draw. The bonus for winning a fight in the first, second, or third round is 3 points, 2 points, and 1 point respectively. The bonus for winning in the third round requires a fight be stopped before 4:59 of the third round. No bonus point will be awarded if a fighter wins via decision. If a fighter misses weight, the opponent (should they comply with weight limits) will receive 3 points due to a walkover victory, regardless of winning or losing the bout, with the fighter who missed weight being deducted 1 point; if the non-offending fighter subsequently wins with a stoppage, all bonus points will be awarded. A fighter who was unable to compete for any reason, will receive a 1-point penalty (-1 point in the standings). The fighters who made weight will not receive a walkover, but will earn points and contracted purse amounts based on their performance in the altered matchup.

== Standings by weight class ==
=== Heavyweight ===
Fighter	Wins	Draws	Losses	1st	2nd	3rd	Total Points (Note: The four fighters with most points advance to the playoffs)
♛ (Russia) Denis Goltsov	2	0	0	1	0	1	10
♛ (Russia) Oleg Popov	2	0	0	0	1	0	8
♛ (Russia) Valentin Moldavsky	1	0	1	1	0	0	6
♛ (United States) Timothy Johnson	1	0	0	1	0	0	6
E (United States) Daniel James	1	0	0	1	0	0	5
E (England) Linton Vassell	1	0	1	0	0	0	3
E (United States) Tyrell Fortune	1	0	0	0	0	0	3
E (Russia) Sergei Bilostenniy	1	0	0	0	0	0	3
E (Brazil) Thiago Santos	0	0	1	0	0	0	0
E (Bulgaria) Blagoy Ivanov	0	0	1	0	0	0	0
E (Brazil) Danilo Marques	0	0	1	0	0	0	0
E (United States) Steve Mowry	0	0	1	0	0	0	0
E (Croatia) Ante Delija	0	0	1	0	0	0	0
E (Brazil) Marcelo Golm	0	0	2	0	0	0	0
E (United States) Davion Franklin	0	0	1	0	0	0	-1

=== Light heavyweight ===
Fighter	Wins	Draws	Losses	1st	2nd	3rd	Total Points (Note: The four fighters with most points advance to the playoffs)
♛ (United States) Impa Kasanganay	2	0	0	1	1	0	11
♛ (Australia) Rob Wilkinson	2	0	0	1	0	0	9
♛ (Turkmenistan) Dovletdzhan Yagshimuradov	2	0	0	1	0	0	9
♛ (United States) Josh Silveira	1	0	1	1	0	0	6
E (Brazil) Antônio Carlos Júnior	1	0	1	1	0	0	6
E (Sweden) Sadibou Sy	1	0	1	0	0	0	4
E (United States) Alex Polizzi	1	0	1	0	0	0	3
E (United States) Andrew Sanchez	0	0	1	0	0	0	0
E (United Kingdom) Tom Breese	0	0	1	0	0	0	0
E (Slovenia) Jakob Nedoh	0	0	2	0	0	0	0
E (Cameroon) Simon Biyong	0	0	2	0	0	0	0

=== Welterweight ===
Fighter	Wins	Draws	Losses	1st	2nd	3rd	Total Points (Note: The four fighters with most points advance to the playoffs)
♛ (Russia) Shamil Musaev	2	0	0	0	2	0	10
♛ (Russia) Magomed Umalatov	2	0	0	1	0	0	9
♛ (South Africa) Don Madge	1	0	1	1	0	0	6
♛ (Russia) Murad Ramazanov	1	0	1	1	0	0	6
E (Russia) Andrey Koreshkov	1	0	1	0	0	0	3
E (Brazil) Goiti Yamauchi	1	0	1	0	0	0	3
E (Brazil) Neiman Gracie	1	0	1	0	0	0	3
E (United States) Logan Storley	1	0	1	0	0	0	3
E (Moldova) Luca Poclit	0	0	1	0	0	0	0
E (United States) Brennan Ward	0	0	1	0	0	0	0
E (Argentina) Laureano Staropoli	0	0	1	0	0	0	-1

=== Lightweight ===
Fighter	Wins	Draws	Losses	1st	2nd	3rd	Total Points (Note: The four fighters with most points advance to the playoffs)
♛ (United States) Brent Primus	2	0	0	0	1	1	9
♛ (Russia) Gadzhi Rabadanov	2	0	0	0	0	0	6
♛ (Canada) Michael Dufort	1	0	1	0	1	0	5
♛ (United States) Clay Collard	1	0	1	0	1	0	5
E (Nicaragua) Elvin Espinoza	1	0	1	0	0	1	4
E (United States) Adam Piccolotti	1	0	1	0	0	0	3
E (Denmark) Mads Burnell	1	0	1	0	0	0	3
E (Brazil) Bruno Miranda	1	0	1	0	0	0	3
E (Brazil) Patricky Pitbull	0	0	2	0	0	0	0
E (United States) Solomon Renfro	0	0	2	0	0	0	-1

=== Featherweight ===
Fighter	Wins	Draws	Losses	1st	2nd	3rd	Total Points (Note: The four fighters with most points advance to the playoffs)
♛ (England) Brendan Loughnane	2	0	0	1	1	0	11
♛ (Brazil) Gabriel Alves Braga	2	0	0	1	1	0	10
♛ (Russia) Timur Khizriev	2	0	0	0	0	0	6
♛ (United States) Kai Kamaka III	2	0	0	0	0	0	6
E (Hungary) Ádám Borics	1	0	0	0	0	0	3
E (United States) Tyler Diamond	1	0	0	0	0	0	3
E (United States) Justin Gonzales	0	0	1	0	0	0	0
E (United States) Bubba Jenkins	0	0	2	0	0	0	0
E (Portugal) Pedro Carvalho	0	0	2	0	0	0	0
E (Peru) Enrique Barzola	0	0	2	0	0	0	0
E (Wales) Brett Johns	0	0	2	0	0	0	0

=== Women's flyweight ===
Fighter	Wins	Draws	Losses	1st	2nd	3rd	Total Points (Note: The four fighters with most points advance to the playoffs)
♛ (England) Dakota Ditcheva	2	0	0	2	0	0	12
♛ (Brazil) Taila Santos	2	0	0	1	0	0	9
♛ (United States) Liz Carmouche	2	0	0	0	0	1	7
♛ (United States) Jena Bishop	1	0	1	1	0	0	6
E (Brazil) Juliana Velasquez	1	0	1	0	1	0	5
E (Japan) Kana Watanabe	1	0	1	0	0	0	3
E (Brazil) Ilara Joanne	1	0	1	0	0	0	3
E (Australia) Chelsea Hackett	0	0	2	0	0	0	0
E (United States) Lisa Mauldin	0	0	2	0	0	0	0
E (United States) Shanna Young	0	0	2	0	0	0	-1

== Playoff ==
=== 2024 PFL Heavyweight playoffs ===
Semifinals
1	(Russia) Denis Goltsov	TKO
4	(United States) Timothy Johnson	1
2	(Russia) Oleg Popov	UD
6	(England) Linton Vassell (Note: Popov was originally scheduled to face #3 ranked Valentin Moldavsky, but he forced to withdraw due to injury and was replaced by #6 ranked Linton Vassell.)	3

Finals
1	(Russia) Denis Goltsov	SUB
2	(Russia) Oleg Popov	1

=== 2024 PFL Light Heavyweight playoffs ===
Semifinals
1	(United States) Impa Kasanganay	UD
4	(United States) Josh Silveira	3
2	(Australia) Rob Wilkinson	3
3	(Turkmenistan) Dovletdzhan Yagshimuradov	UD

Finals
1	(United States) Impa Kasanganay	1
3	(Turkmenistan) Dovletdzhan Yagshimuradov	KO

=== 2024 PFL Welterweight playoffs ===
Semifinals
1	(Russia) Shamil Musaev	UD
4	(Russia) Murad Ramazanov	3
2	(Russia) Magomed Umalatov	UD
7	(Brazil) Neiman Gracie (Note: Umalatov was originally scheduled to face #3 ranked Don Madge, but he forced to withdraw due to injury and was replaced by #7 ranked Neiman Gracie.)	3

Finals
1	(Russia) Shamil Musaev	TKO
2	(Russia) Magomed Umalatov	3

=== 2024 PFL Lightweight playoffs ===
Semifinals
1	(United States) Brent Primus	UD
4	(United States) Clay Collard	3
2	(Russia) Gadzhi Rabadanov	KO
3	(Canada) Michael Dufort	2

Finals
1	(United States) Brent Primus	3
2	(Russia) Gadzhi Rabadanov	KO

=== 2024 PFL Featherweight playoffs ===
Semifinals
1	(England) Brendan Loughnane	SD
4	(United States) Kai Kamaka III	3
2	(Brazil) Gabriel Alves Braga	3
3	(Russia) Timur Khizriev	SD

Finals
1	(England) Brendan Loughnane	5
3	(Russia) Timur Khizriev	UD

=== 2024 PFL Women's Flyweight playoffs ===
Semifinals
1	(England) Dakota Ditcheva	TKO
4	(United States) Jena Bishop	1
2	(Brazil) Taila Santos	UD
3	(United States) Liz Carmouche	3

Finals
1	(England) Dakota Ditcheva	TKO
2	(Brazil) Taila Santos	2

Legend
(SD)	(Split Decision)
(UD)	(Unanimous Decision)
(MD)	(Majority Decision)
SUB	Submission
(T)KO	(Technical) Knock Out
L	Loss

== PFL Europe ==
Starting in 2024, PFL Europe featured European MMA fighters. The format followed the same as other PFL Seasons, with the winner receiving a $100,000 prize.

=== PFL Europe Welterweight ===
Quarter-finals
(Poland) Tomasz Łangowski	1
(Albania) Florim Zendeli	SUB
(England) Jack Grant	KO
(England) Charlie Leary	1
(France) Yassin Najid	1
(Italy) Daniele Miceli	SUB
(The Gambia) Ibrahima Mané	SD
(Angola) Chequina Noso Pedro	3

Semi-finals
(Albania) Florim Zendeli	SD
(England) Jack Grant	3
(Italy) Daniele Miceli	TKO
(The Gambia) Ibrahima Mané	1

Final
(Albania) Florim Zendeli	SUB
(Italy) Daniele Miceli	1

=== PFL Europe Lightweight ===
Quarter-finals
(Poland) Jakub Kaszuba	UD
(England) Kane Mousah	3
(Latvia) Aleksandr Chizov	1
(Italy) Daniele Scatizzi	SUB
(France) Yazid Chouchane	2
(Spain) Ignacio Capella	KO
(Germany) Anatolij Baal	1
(England) Connor Hughes	KO

Semi-finals
(Poland) Jakub Kaszuba	UD
(Italy) Daniele Scatizzi	3
(Spain) Ignacio Capella	3
(England) Connor Hughes	UD

Final
(Poland) Jakub Kaszuba	TKO
(England) Connor Hughes	4

=== PFL Europe Bantamweight ===
Quarter-finals
(England) Dean Garnett (Note: De Paepe failed medicals and Garnett therefore got a bye to the semi-finals)	BYE
(Belgium) Ayton De Paepe	—
(Germany) Khurshed Kakhorov	KO
(Finland) Tuomas Grönvall	3
(England) Dominique Wooding	1
(France) Julien Pierre Lopez	SUB
(Germany) Alexander Luster	SUB
(Turkey) Alperen Karabulut	1

Semi-finals
(England) Dean Garnett	3
(England) Lewis McGrillen-Evans (Note: Garnett was originally scheduled to face Khurshed Kakhorov, but he forced to withdraw due to an undisclosed injury and was replaced by Lewis McGrillen-Evans.)	KO
(France) Julien Pierre Lopez	1
(Germany) Alexander Luster	SUB

Final
(England) Lewis McGrillen-Evans	TKO
(Germany) Alexander Luster	2

=== PFL Europe Women's Flyweight ===
Quarter-finals
(England) Shanelle Dyer	KO
(Georgia (country)) Mariam Torchinava	1
(Italy) Valentina Scatizzi	UD
(France) Marie Louiseau	3
(Netherlands) Lizzy Gevers	3
(Poland) Karolina Wójcik	UD
(Republic of Ireland) Dee Begley	2
(Poland) Paulina Wiśniewska	TKO

Semi-finals
(England) Shanelle Dyer	SD
(Italy) Valentina Scatizzi	3
(Poland) Karolina Wójcik	3
(Poland) Paulina Wiśniewska	UD

Final
(Italy) Valentina Scatizzi (Note: Wiśniewska was originally scheduled to face Shanelle Dyer, but she withdrew due to injury and was replaced by Valentina Scatizzi.)	1
(Poland) Paulina Wiśniewska	TKO

== PFL MENA ==
Starting in 2024, PFL MENA featured Middle East and North African fighters, and stage in the MENA region. The format followed the same as other PFL Seasons, with the winner receiving a $100,000 prize.

=== PFL MENA Welterweight ===
Quarter-finals
(Egypt) Omar El-Dafrawy	UD
(Lebanon) Anthony Zeidan	3
(Jordan) Jarrah Al-Silawi	SUB
(Algeria) Rayan Atmani	1
(Iran) Amir Fazli	3
(Morocco) Badreddine Diani	UD
(Kuwait) Mohammad Alaqraa	TKO
(France) Youcef Ouabbas	3

Semi-finals
(Egypt) Omar El-Dafrawy	KO
(Jordan) Jarrah Al-Silawi	1
(Iran) Amir Fazli (Note: Alaqraa was originally scheduled to face Badreddine Diani, but he forced to withdraw due to an undisclosed injury and was replaced by Amir Fazli.)	3
(Kuwait) Mohammad Alaqraa	UD

Final
(Egypt) Omar El-Dafrawy	TKO
(Kuwait) Mohammad Alaqraa	2

=== PFL MENA Lightweight ===
Quarter-finals
(Egypt) Ahmed Amir	3
(France) Souhil Tahiri	UD
(Lebanon) Josh Togo	1
(Iran) Mohsen Mohammadseifi	TKO
(Lebanon) Georges Eid	UD
(Pakistan) Abbas Khan	3
(Kuwait) Abdullah Saleem	SUB (Note: Originally a submission (triangle choke) win for Saleem; overturned after he failed an in-competition drug test, Reguigui advanced to semifinal.)
(Tunisia) Omar Reguigui	1

Semi-finals
(France) Souhil Tahiri	3
(Iran) Mohsen Mohammadseifi	UD
(Lebanon) Georges Eid	TKO
(Tunisia) Omar Reguigui	1

Final
(Iran) Mohsen Mohammadseifi	UD
(Lebanon) Georges Eid	5

=== PFL MENA Featherweight ===
Quarter-finals
(Jordan) Yazeed Hasanain	2
(Saudi Arabia) Abdullah Al-Qahtani	TKO
(Jordan) Abdalrahman Alhyasat	UD
(Egypt) Ahmed Tarek	3
(Egypt) Mido Mohamed	3
(Morocco) Maraoune Bellagouit	TKO
(Egypt) Islam Reda	UD
(Morocco) Adam Meskini	3

Semi-finals
(Saudi Arabia) Abdullah Al-Qahtani	3
(Jordan) Abdalrahman Alhyasat	UD
(Morocco) Maraoune Bellagouit	3
(Egypt) Islam Reda	UD

Final
(Saudi Arabia) Abdullah Al-Qahtani (Note: Islam Reda pulled out with injury and was replaced by Maraoune Bellagouit.)	TKO
(Morocco) Maraoune Bellagouit (Note: Abdalrahman Alhyasat withdrew due to "urgent health problem" and was replaced by Al-Qahtani.)	1

=== PFL MENA Bantamweight ===
Quarter-finals
(Jordan) Jalal Al Daaja (Note: Officially a unanimous decision win for Ismail, Al Daaja advanced to the semifinal due to Ismail missed weight.)	DRAW
(Kuwait) Tariq Ismail	3
(Jordan) Nawras Abzakh	3
(Iraq) Ali Taleb	UD
(Morocco) Xavier Alaoui	2
(Morocco) Rachid El Hazoume	SUB
(Algeria) Elias Boudegzdame	SUB
(Egypt) Hassan Mandour	2r.

Semi-finals
(Jordan) Jalal Al Daaja	1
(Iraq) Ali Taleb	KO
(Morocco) Rachid El Hazoume	UD
(Algeria) Elias Boudegzdame	3

Final
(Iraq) Ali Taleb	KO
(Morocco) Rachid El Hazoume	1

== See also ==
- List of PFL events
- List of current PFL fighters
- 2024 in UFC
- 2024 in Bellator MMA
- 2024 in ONE Championship
- 2024 in Absolute Championship Akhmat
- 2024 in Konfrontacja Sztuk Walki
- 2024 in Rizin Fighting Federation
- 2024 in LUX Fight League
- 2024 in Oktagon MMA
- 2024 in Brave Combat Federation
- 2024 in UAE Warriors
- 2024 in Legacy Fighting Alliance
- 2024 in Cage Warriors
