= PFL Europe 2 (2025) =

Professional Fighters League MMA event in 2025

- The poster for PFL Europe 2
- Promotion: Professional Fighters League
- Date: July 5, 2025
- Venue: ING Arena
- City: Brussels, Belgium

Event chronology
| PFL MENA 2 | PFL Europe 2 | PFL Champions Series 2 |

PFL Europe 2: 2025 Brussels was a mixed martial arts event produced by the Professional Fighters League that took place on July 5, 2025, at the ING Arena in Brussels, Belgium.

== Background ==
The event was originally slated for an event in Paris on May 23 was cancelled and shifted date to July 5. This event marked the promotion's debut in Belgium.

A welterweight bout between undefeated prospect Patrick Habirora and Danny Roberts headlined the event.

As a result of the cancellation of an event on May 23, a bantamweight bout between UFC veteran Taylor Lapilus and 2024 PFL MENA bantamweight winner Ali Taleb served as co-main event.

This event also featured the quarterfinal of the 2025 PFL Europe Tournament in a bantamweight division. Alexander Luster withdrew from the tournament against Dean Garnett due to an injury and was replaced by Tuomas Grönvall.

== Results ==
Main card (DAZN)
| Weight class | | | | Method | Round | Time | Notes |
|---|---|---|---|---|---|---|---|
| Welterweight | Patrick Habirora | def. | Danny Roberts | KO (head kick) | 1 | 4:32 |
| Bantamweight | Taylor Lapilus | def. | Ali Taleb | Decision (unanimous) (30–27, 30–27, 30–27) | 3 | 5:00 |
| Featherweight | Gaetano Pirrello | def. | Salvatore Liga | Submission (ninja choke) | 1 | 3:22 |
| Light Heavyweight | Boris Mbarga Atangana | def. | Bruno Santos | TKO (punches) | 1 | 0:56 |
| Welterweight | Chequina Noso Pedro | def. | Khamzat Abaev | Decision (unanimous) (30–27, 29–28, 29–28) | 3 | 5:00 |
| Bantamweight | Movsar Ibragimov | def. | Gerardo Fanny | Submission (Von Flue choke) | 2 | 1:42 |
Preliminary card (DAZN)
| Featherweight | Ibragim Ibragimov | def. | Mathys Duragrin | Decision (unanimous) (30–27, 30–27, 30–27) | 3 | 5:00 |
| Bantamweight | Dean Garnett | def. | Tuomas Grönvall | Decision (unanimous) (29–28, 29–28, 29–28) | 3 | 5:00 | (Note: 2025 PFL Europe Bantamweight Tournament Quarterfinal.) |
| Bantamweight | Mahio Campanella | def. | Matiss Zaharovs | Decision (unanimous) (29–28, 29–28, 29–28) | 3 | 5:00 | (Note: 2025 PFL Europe Bantamweight Tournament Quarterfinal.) |
| Lightweight | Catalin Safta | def. | Nicolas Di Franco | Decision (split) (30–27, 28–29, 29–28) | 3 | 5:00 |
| Bantamweight | Gustavo Oliveira | def. | Anas Azizoun | KO (spinning back elbow) | 1 | 3:25 | (Note: 2025 PFL Europe Bantamweight Tournament Quarterfinal.) |
Preliminary card (YouTube / DAZN)
| Bantamweight | Jan Ciepłowski | def. | Julien Lopez | TKO (punches) | 1 | 3:43 | (Note: 2025 PFL Europe Bantamweight Tournament Quarterfinal.) |
| Women's Flyweight | Paulina Wiśniewska | def. | Jessica Cunha | Submission (rear-naked choke) | 1 | 4:12 |
| Featherweight | Adam Meskini | def. | Tiziano Ferranti | TKO (knee and punches) | 2 | 4:56 |
| Bantamweight | Levi Batchelor | def. | Fahdi Khaled | Submission (Ezekiel choke) | 3 | 4:34 |
| Catchweight (163 lb) | Salvo Giudice | def. | Brice Belghazi | Submission (rear-naked choke) | 3 | 2:14 |

== Tournament brackets ==
=== 2025 PFL Europe Bantamweight Tournament ===
Quarter-finals
(France) Mahio Campanella | UD
(Latvia) Matiss Zaharovs | 3
(France) Anas Azizoun | 1
(Portugal) Gustavo Oliveira | KO
(England) Dean Garnett | UD
(Finland) Tuomas Grönvall (Note: Alexander Luster withdrew from the tournament due to an injury and was replaced by Tuomas Grönvall.) | 3
(Poland) Jan Ciepłowski | TKO
(France) Julien Lopez | 1

Semi-finals
(France) Mahio Campanella
(Portugal) Gustavo Oliveira
(England) Dean Garnett
(Poland) Jan Ciepłowski

Final

== See also ==
- 2025 in Professional Fighters League
- List of PFL events
- List of current PFL fighters
