= PFL Europe 3 (2025) =

Professional Fighters League mixed martial arts event in 2025

- The poster for PFL Europe 3
- Promotion: Professional Fighters League
- Date: September 26, 2025
- Venue: Zénith Nantes Métropole
- City: Nantes, France

Event chronology
| PFL 10 | PFL Europe 3 | PFL MENA 3 |

PFL Europe 3: Nantes 2025 was a mixed martial arts event produced by the Professional Fighters League that took place on September 26, 2025, at Zénith Nantes Métropole in Nantes, France.

== Background ==
The event marked the promotion's first visit to Nantes and fourth held in France, since PFL Europe 4 (2024) in December 2024. The promotion was originally scheduled an event in France on May 23, but the event was cancelled and shifted to July 5 in Belgium instead.

The event was scheduled to be headline by a welterweight bout between Abdoul Abdouraguimov and promotional newcomer Kevin Jousset. However, Abdouraguimov withdrew from the event due to personal reasons and the bout was cancelled. As a results, a lightweight bout between Amin Ayoub and Donovan Desmae was promoted to new main event status. In turn, Desmae was forced to withdraw due to being hospitalised on August 23 and was replaced by Keweny Lopes.

The event was featured the semifinals of 2025 PFL Europe Tournament in a lightweight and bantamweight divisions. Mahio Campanella withdrew from the event against Gustavo Oliveira and was replaced by Baris Adiguzel. In turn, Oliveira was forced to withdraw due to a cut sustained in training and was replaced by Julien Lopez.

== Results ==
Main card (DAZN / PFL App)
| Weight class | | | | Method | Round | Time | Notes |
|---|---|---|---|---|---|---|---|
| Lightweight | Amin Ayoub | def. | Keweny Lopes | TKO (punches) | 3 | 3:19 |
| Light Heavyweight | Boris Mbarga Atangana | def. | Jhony Gregory | TKO (punches) | 1 | 2:17 |
| Bantamweight | Baris Adiguzel | def. | Julien Lopez | KO (punches) | 1 | 0:36 | (Note: 2025 PFL Europe Bantamweight Tournament Semifinal.) |
| Lightweight | Connor Hughes | def. | Gino van Steenis | KO (head kick) | 1 | 2:56 | (Note: 2025 PFL Europe Lightweight Tournament Semifinal.) |
| Bantamweight | Dean Garnett | def. | Jan Ciepłowski | Submission (guillotine choke) | 3 | 0:38 | (Note: 2025 PFL Europe Bantamweight Tournament Semifinal.) |
| Lightweight | Aleksandr Chizov | def. | Claudio Pacella | Decision (split) (28–29, 29–28, 29–28) | 3 | 5:00 | (Note: 2025 PFL Europe Lightweight Tournament Semifinal.) |
Preliminary card (DAZN / PFL App)
| Lightweight | Darragh Kelly | def. | Bakhtiyar Abdulaev | Submission (rear-naked choke) | 1 | 2:29 |
| Middleweight | Vincent del Guerra | def. | Sofiane Aïssaoui | TKO (front kick to the body and punches) | 3 | 0:24 |
| Lightweight | Mark Ewen | def. | Sebastien Di Franco | Submission (brabo choke) | 1 | 3:18 | (Note: 2025 PFL Europe Lightweight Tournament Alternate bout.) |
| Women's Strawweight | María Guédez Jr. | def. | Kiya O'Sullivan | Decision (split) (30–26, 28–29, 29–28) | 3 | 5:00 |

== Tournament brackets ==
=== 2025 PFL Europe Lightweight Tournament ===
Quarter-finals
(England) Connor Hughes | KO
(Belgium) Sebastien Di Franco | 1
(Republic of Ireland) Decky McAleenan | 3
(Spain) Gino van Steenis | UD
(England) Gavin Hughes | 3
(Italy) Claudio Pacella | UD
(Scotland) Mark Ewen | 1
(Latvia) Aleksandr Chizov | TKO

Semi-finals
(England) Connor Hughes | KO
(Spain) Gino van Steenis | 1
(Italy) Claudio Pacella | 3
(Latvia) Aleksandr Chizov | SD

Final
(England) Connor Hughes
(Latvia) Aleksandr Chizov

=== 2025 PFL Europe Bantamweight Tournament ===
Quarter-finals
(France) Mahio Campanella | UD
(Latvia) Matiss Zaharovs | 3
(France) Anas Azizoun | 1
(Portugal) Gustavo Oliveira | KO
(England) Dean Garnett | UD
(Finland) Tuomas Grönvall (Note: Alexander Luster withdrew from the tournament due to an injury and was replaced by Tuomas Grönvall.) | 3
(Poland) Jan Ciepłowski | TKO
(France) Julien Lopez | 1

Semi-finals
(France) Baris Adiguzel (Note: Mahio Campanella withdrew from the tournament and was replaced by Baris Adiguzel.) | KO
(France) Julien Lopez (Note: Gustavo Oliveira was forced to withdrew due to a cut sustained in training and was replaced by Julien Lopez.) | 1
(England) Dean Garnett | SUB
(Poland) Jan Ciepłowski | 3

Final
(France) Baris Adiguzel
(England) Dean Garnett

== See also ==
- 2025 in Professional Fighters League
- List of PFL events
- List of current PFL fighters
