= PFL Europe 3 =

PFL Europe 3 may refer to the following events from the Professional Fighters League:

- PFL Europe 3 (2023)
- PFL Europe 3 (2024)

== See also ==
- PFL (disambiguation)
