= Mohsen Mohammadseifi =

Iranian professional wushu athlete

Mohsen Mohammadseifii
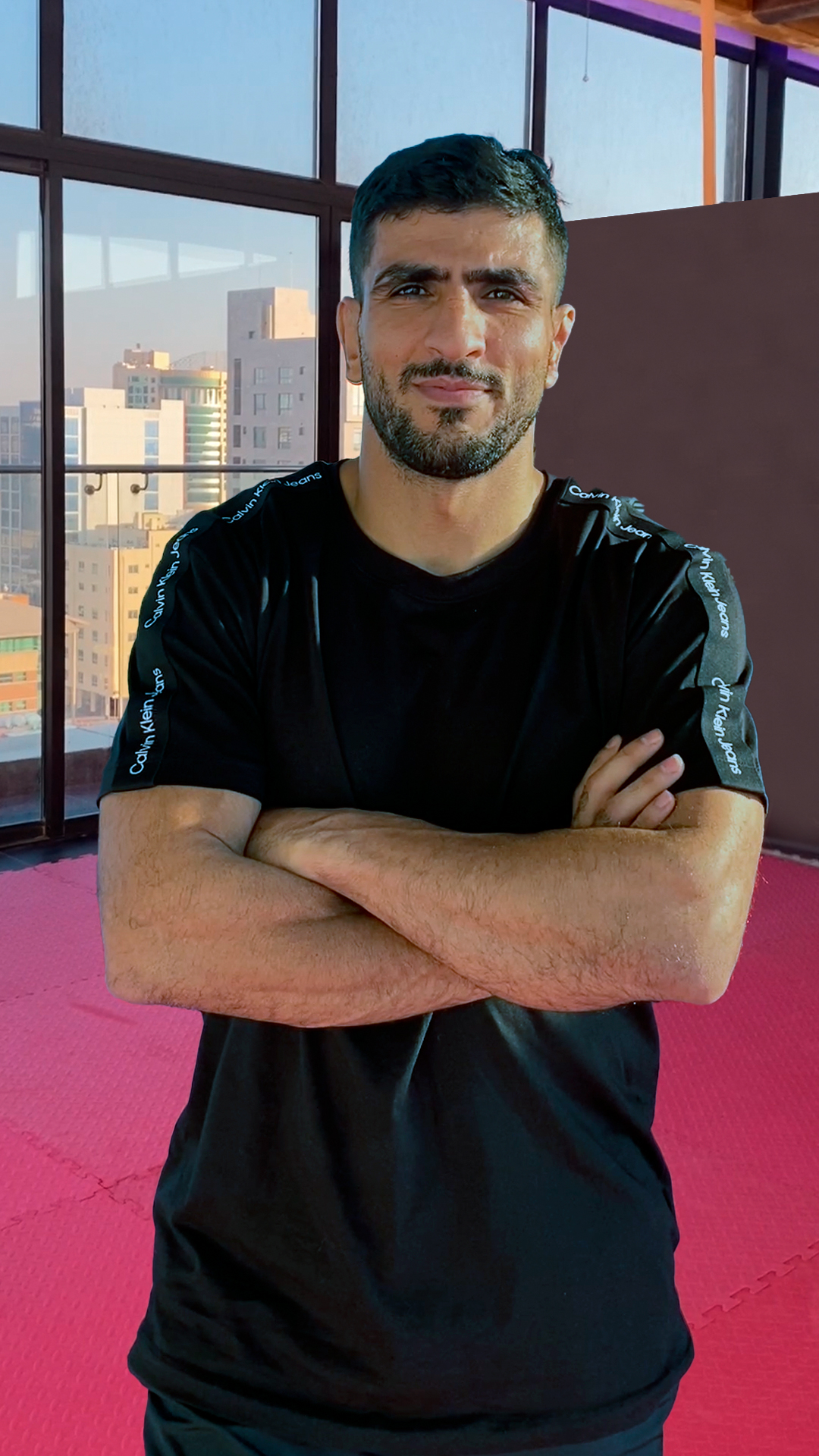
- Mohammadseifi in 2024
- Born: September 8, 1989 (age 37); Zanjan, Iran
- Other names: The Golden Boy
- Height: 5 ft 8 in (1.73 m)
- Weight: 154.6 lb (70.1 kg; 11.04 st)
- Division: Lightweight
- Reach: 63.0 in (160 cm)
- Style: Wushu
- Fighting out of: Zanjan, Iran
- Years active: 2019–present

Mixed martial arts record
- Total: 10
- Wins: 8
- By knockout: 4
- By decision: 4
- Losses: 2
- By knockout: 1
- By submission: 1

Other information
- Mixed martial arts record from Sherdog

Mohsen Mohammadseifi (Persian: محسن محمدسیفی, born 8 September 1989 in Zanjan) is an Iranian mixed martial artist and wushu athlete currently competing in the Professional Fighters League. He previously competed for the Bahrain-based Brave Combat Federation.

He won the gold medal at the 2010 Asian Games in Guangzhou and 2014 Asian Games in Incheon, South Korea. He won the 1st place at the 2018 Asian Games in Jakarta, Indonesia. He won 5 wushu world championships gold medals between 2011 and 2019. He has been appointed as the new head of the Wushu Board in the city of Zanjan, Iran.

== Mixed martial arts career ==
Mohammadseifi transitioned into mixed martial arts in 2019.

=== Brave Combat Federation ===
He has been under contract with Brave Combat Federation since 2021. Mohammadseifi made his promotional debut at Brave CF 48 on March 18, 2021, defeating Bichi Zakaria by first-round TKO. He competes in the Brave lightweight division and has scored 4 straight wins in his last four fights.

=== Professional Fighters League ===
Mohammadseifi faced Josh Togo at PFL MENA 2 on July 12, 2024. He won the bout via TKO stoppage in the first round and advanced in the MENA (Middle East and North Africa) tournament.

In the semi-final, Mohammadseifi faced Souhil Taïri on September 20, 2024, on PFL MENA 3, defeating him via unanimous decision to advance to the finals.

In the final, Mohammadseifi faced Georges Eid on November 29, 2024, at PFL 10. He won the fight and tournament final by unanimous decision.

== Championships and accomplishments ==
=== Mixed martial arts ===
- Professional Fighters League
  - 2024 PFL MENA Lightweight Championship

== Mixed martial arts record ==
Professional record breakdown
| 10 matches | 8 wins | 2 losses |
| By knockout | 4 | 1 |
| By submission | 0 | 1 |
| By decision | 4 | 0 |

| Res. | Record | Opponent | Method | Event | Date | Round | Time | Location | Notes |
|---|---|---|---|---|---|---|---|---|---|
| Loss | 8–2 | Mohammad Fahmi | Submission (rear-naked choke) | PFL MENA 3 (2025) | September 27, 2025 | 1 | 4:25 | Riyadh, Saudi Arabia | 2025 PFL MENA Lightweight Tournament Semifinal. |
| Win | 8–1 | Ahmed El Sisy | Decision (unanimous) | PFL MENA 1 (2025) | May 9, 2025 | 3 | 5:00 | Jeddah, Saudi Arabia | 2025 PFL MENA Lightweight Tournament Quarterfinal. |
| Win | 7–1 | Georges Eid | Decision (unanimous) | PFL 10 (2024) | November 29, 2024 | 5 | 5:00 | Riyadh, Saudi Arabia | Won the 2024 PFL MENA Lightweight Tournament. |
| Win | 6–1 | Souhil Taïri | Decision (unanimous) | PFL MENA 3 (2024) | September 20, 2024 | 3 | 5:00 | Riyadh, Saudi Arabia | 2024 PFL MENA Lightweight Tournament Semifinal. |
| Win | 5–1 | Josh Togo | TKO (punches) | PFL MENA 2 (2024) | July 12, 2024 | 1 | 3:33 | Riyadh, Saudi Arabia | 2024 PFL MENA Lightweight Tournament Quarterfinal. |
| Win | 4–1 | David Forster | Decision (unanimous) | Brave CF 79 | December 8, 2023 | 3 | 5:00 | Isa Town, Bahrain | |
| Win | 3–1 | Noor El Islam | KO (punch) | Brave CF 72 | June 23, 2023 | 1 | 1:37 | Riffa, Bahrain | |
| Win | 2–1 | Dhia Meguellati | TKO (punches) | Brave CF 67 | December 12, 2022 | 1 | 2:47 | Manama, Bahrain | |
| Win | 1–1 | Bichi Zakaria | TKO (punches) | Brave CF 48 | March 18, 2021 | 1 | 0:43 | Arad, Bahrain | |
| Loss | 0–1 | Rong Zhu | TKO (punches) | WLF W.A.R.S. 35 | June 16, 2019 | 1 | 2:50 | Zhengzhou, China | Lightweight debut. |
