= Patrick Habirora =

Belgian mixed martial artist (born 2001)

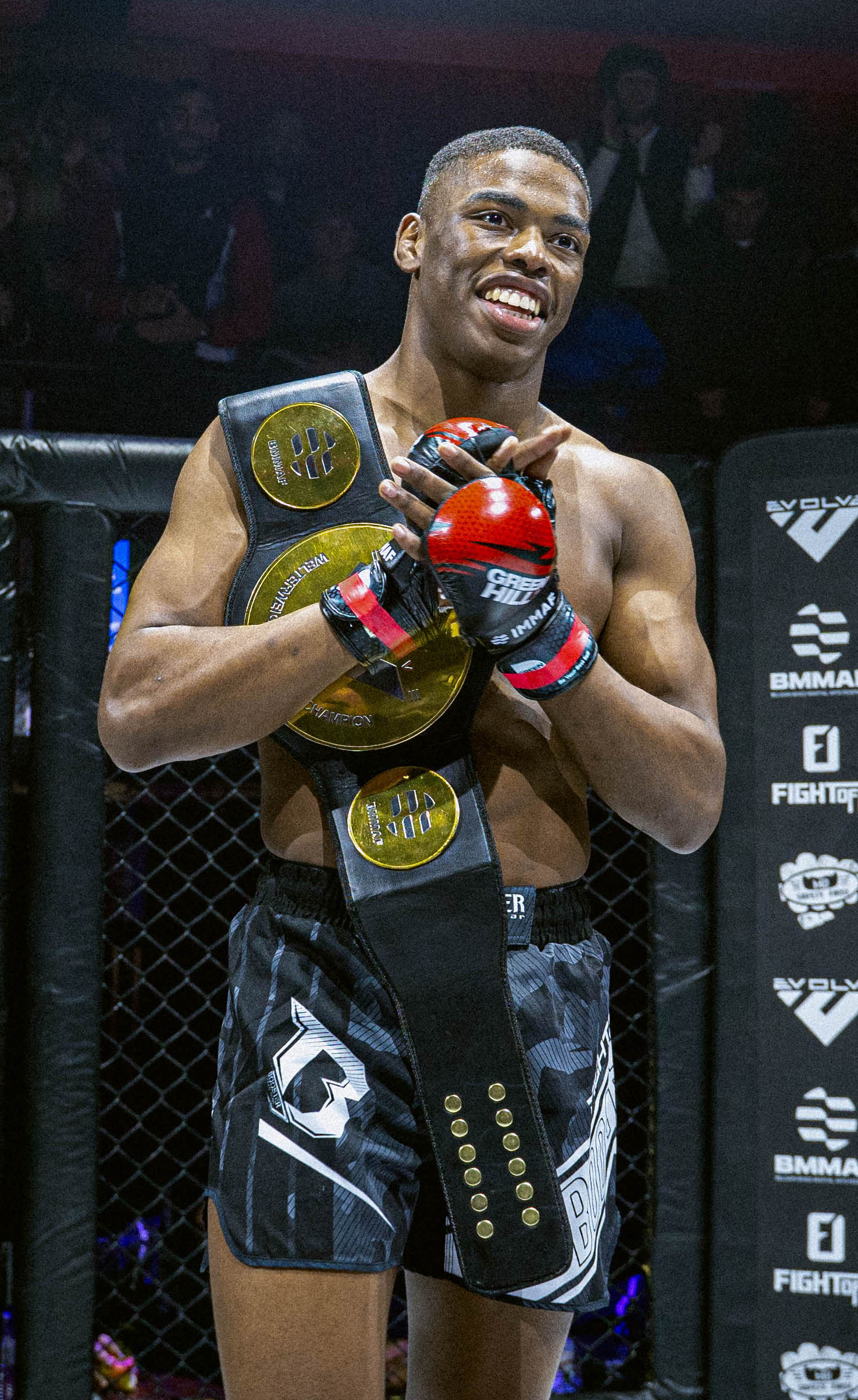
- Habirora in 2022
- Born: March 26, 2001 (age 25); Namur, Belgium
- Other names: The Belgian Bomber
- Height: 6 ft 1 in (1.85 m)
- Weight: 171 lb (78 kg; 12 st 3 lb)
- Division: Lightweight; Welterweight
- Reach: 75 in (191 cm)
- Fighting out of: Namur, Belgium
- Team: Team Sendo
- Years active: 2024–present

Mixed martial arts record
- Total: 10
- Wins: 10
- By knockout: 8
- By submission: 1
- By decision: 1
- Losses: 0

Other information
- Mixed martial arts record from Sherdog

Patrick Habirora (born March 26, 2001) is a Belgian mixed martial artist. He currently competes in the Welterweight division of the Professional Fighters League (PFL). As of August 21, 2026, he is #4 in the PFL welterweight rankings.

== Background ==
Habirora was born in Namur, Belgium, he began his sporting career with football and found himself in the second division at the age of seven, at which point he had the opportunity to move up to the first division. He planned to live at a boarding school for football at the age of 13, but it was impossible for his parents to make the trips back and forth. Despite his promising start in football, his refusal to drop down a level led him to quit. He then discovered MMA almost by chance, but was quickly inspired by the techniques and philosophy of this combat sport.

== Mixed martial arts career ==
=== Amateur career ===
In 2022, Habirora made a name for himself at the European Amateur MMA Championships 2022 in Italy, with a series of 4 knockout victories, notably winning his first fight in just nine seconds. Despite as he subsequently won a silver medal at the same competition.

In March 2023, Habirora competed at the Dutch promotion Levels Fight League, which a unanimous decision victory against Bandai Lumassa. In November 2023, Habirora won gold medal at the IMMAF Amateur MMA World Championships in Albania. He has announced his intention to turn professional career.

=== Professional career ===
Habirora made his professional debut against Ognjen Zivanovic at "AEF 5" on January 13, 2024. He won the professional debut via technical knockout in round one.

In his second fight, Habirora faced Claudio Pacella on March 7, 2024, at PFL Europe 1, winning the fight via unanimous decision.

In the third fight, Habirora faced Giovanny Giraldo at "AEF 6" on May 17, 2024. He won the fight via technical knockout in round one.

In June 2024, Habirora competed as part of the Ares Fighting Championship against Alex Aston at Ares FC 22 in Paris, which he won the fight via technical knockout in round one.

=== Professional Fighters League ===
On November 26, 2024, it was reported that Habirora signed with Professional Fighters League.

Habirora faced Catalin Safta on December 14, 2024, at PFL Europe 4. He won the fight via knockout in round three.

In his bout outside the PFL, Habirora faced Dima Glevka on February 7, 2025, at "Fight and Furious in Octagon 2", winning the fight via technical knockout in round one.

Habirora was initially scheduled to face Nicolas Di Franco on May 23, 2025, at PFL Paris. However, in early May, it was announced that the event has been cancelled.

Moving up to welterweight, Habirora faced Danny Roberts on July 5, 2025, at PFL Europe 2. He won the fight via a head kick knockout in round one.

Habirora faced Kevin Jousset on December 13, 2025, at PFL Lyon: Nemkov vs. Ferreira. He won the fight via knockout in round one.

Habirora faced Benson Henderson on May 23, 2026, at PFL Brussels. He won the fight via knockout in just 20 seconds in round one.

Habirora faced Omar El Dafrawy on November 14, 2026, at PFL Returns to Dubai. He won the fight via a guillotine choke technical submission in round one.

== Fashion career ==
Outside of his MMA career, Habirora is also present in the fashion world. He is an ambassador for the French brand Project X Paris.

== Mixed martial arts record ==
Professional record breakdown
10 matches	10 wins	0 losses
By knockout	8	0
By submission	1	0
By decision	1	0

Res.	Record	Opponent	Method	Event	Date	Round	Time	Location	Notes
Win	10–0	Omar El Dafrawy	Technical Submission (guillotine choke)	PFL Dubai: Nemkov vs. Bilostenniy	November 14, 2026	1	3:11	Dubai, United Arab Emirates	
Win	9–0	Benson Henderson	KO (punches)	PFL Brussels: Habirora vs. Henderson	May 23, 2026	1	0:20	Brussels, Belgium	
Win	8–0	Kevin Jousset	KO (punches)	PFL Lyon: Nemkov vs. Ferreira	December 13, 2025	1	2:42	Décines-Charpieu, France	
Win	7–0	Danny Roberts	KO (head kick)	PFL Europe 2 (2025)	July 5, 2025	1	4:32	Brussels, Belgium	Welterweight debut.
Win	6–0	Dima Glevka	TKO (knee and punches)	Fight and Furious 2	February 7, 2025	1	3:07	Metz, France	Catchweight (163 lb) bout.
Win	5–0	Catalin Safta	KO (punch)	PFL Europe 4 (2024)	December 14, 2024	3	2:16	Décines-Charpieu, France	Catchweight (165 lb) bout.
Win	4–0	Alex Aston	TKO (punch to the body)	Ares FC 22	June 14, 2024	1	1:39	Paris, France	
Win	3–0	Giovanny Giraldo	TKO (punches)	AEF 6	May 17, 2024	1	1:33	Rennes, France	
Win	2–0	Claudio Pacella	Decision (unanimous)	PFL Europe 1 (2024)	March 7, 2024	3	5:00	Paris, France	Lightweight debut.
Win	1–0	Ognjen Zivanovic	TKO (punches)	AEF 5	January 13, 2024	1	N/A	Rennes, France	Catchweight (165 lb) bout.

== See also ==
- List of current PFL fighters
- List of male mixed martial artists
