= Sofiane Aïssaoui =

Algerian mixed martial arts fighter

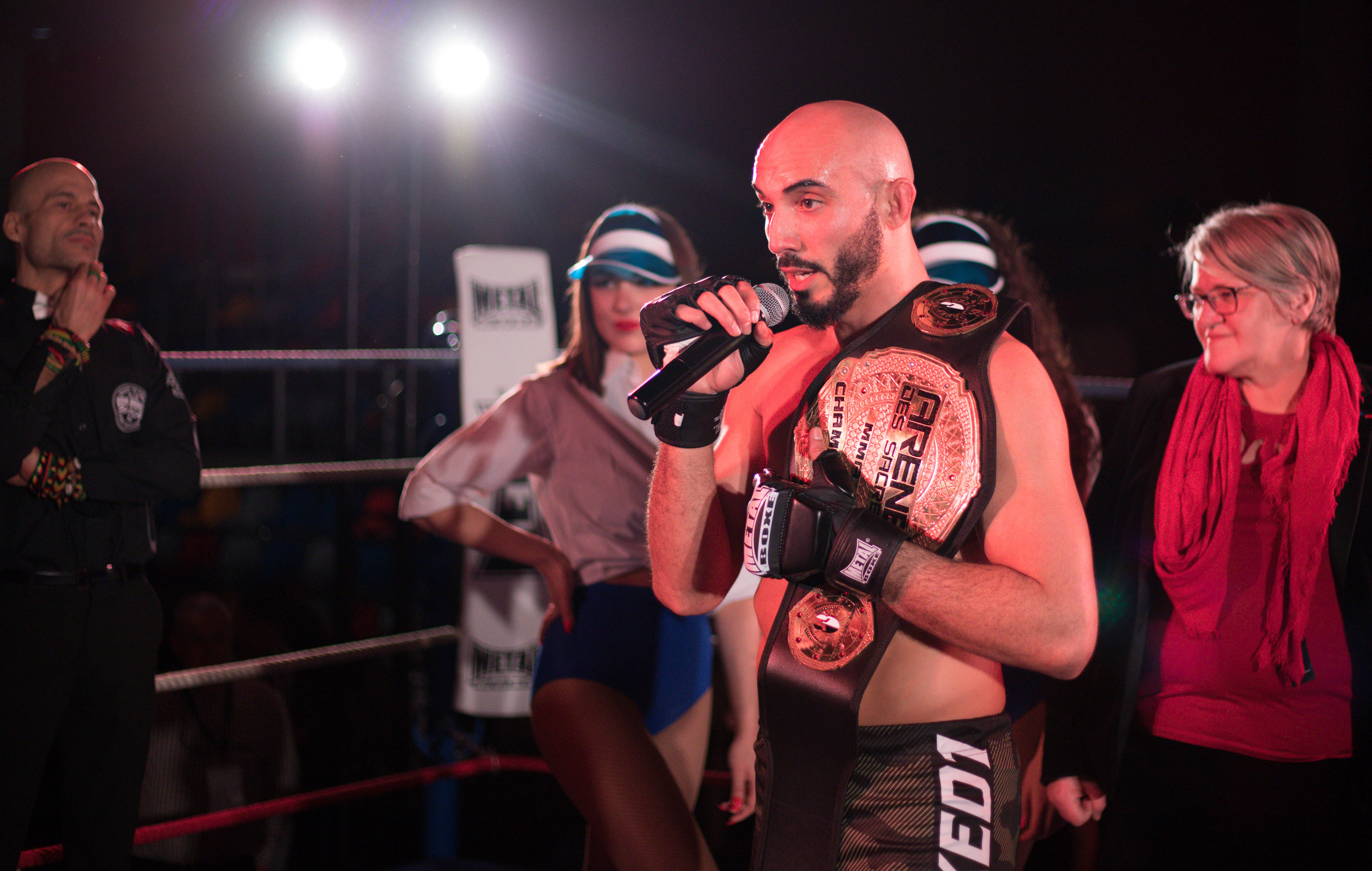
- Sofiane Aïssaoui thanking his public after winning the international title of the Arena Des Sacres in 2020.
- Born: Sofiane Aïssaoui; August 23, 1991 (age 35); Revin, France
- Other names: The Lion
- Nationality: France; Algeria
- Height: 5 ft 11 in (1.80 m)
- Weight: 182.6 lb (82.8 kg; 13.04 st)
- Division: Welterweight
- Fighting out of: Reims, France
- Team: Atch Academy; Lion Fight Gym
- Years active: 2014–present

Mixed martial arts record
- Total: 19
- Wins: 12
- By knockout: 2
- By submission: 7
- By decision: 3
- Losses: 7
- By knockout: 2
- By submission: 3
- By decision: 2

Other information
- Mixed martial arts record from Sherdog

Sofiane Aïssaoui (born August 23, 1991, in Revin) nicknamed "The Lion", is an Algerian-French mixed martial artist competing in the Welterweight division. A professional mixed martial artist since 2017, he was also a French champion of Pancrase.

== Background ==
Sofiane Aïssaoui nicknamed "The Lion", was born on August 23, 1991, in Revin, his father is a leather worker named Smaïl and his mother who is a nurse named Malika. He has three brothers and a sister, and a daughter named Aliyah.

Sofiane began training judo in 1995 at the age of 4 until the age of 22. Then he discovered MMA at the age of 23.

== Mixed martial arts career ==
As an amateur, he was selected for the French MMA team. He participated in the IMMAF amateur world championship in Las Vegas in July 2015 and the IMMAF European championship in Birmingham in November 2015.

From 2014 to 2016, he was a member of the French MMA team.

In 2016, he became WFC amateur MMA world champion in Milan, then Grappling world champion in May 2018, and won three French championship titles, two in Karate mix and one in Pancrace.

In June 2016, he opened his martial arts and combat sports gym in Reims called Lion Fight Gym.

In 2017, he won his first world belt.

In 2019, according to the 100% FIGHT organization, Sofiane makes the best submission of the year against Dimitri Henry during the King of Fight.

In 2020, he won the international title of Arena Des Sacres against Ruslan Heleshko.

In 2021, the Ministry of Sports rewards Sofiane Aïssaoui with the bronze medal, for his commitment to sports and associations.

== Championships and achievements ==
- French champion in Pancrase - amateur -
- Twice French champion in Karate Mix -
- European Champion in Luta Livre
- World MMA Champion - amateur WFC (-77 kg)
- WGMA World Grappling Champion (-77 kg)
- Road to Contenders Champion - semi pro (-77 kg)
- Champion of the Arena of Sacres (-77 kg)

== Mixed martial arts record ==
Professional record breakdown
19 matches	12 wins	7 losses
By knockout	2	2
By submission	7	3
By decision	3	2

Res.	Record	Opponent	Method	Event	Date	Round	Time	Location	Notes
Win	12–7	Vladislav Schepanskyi	Submission (rear-naked choke)	Arene des Sacres 10	April 4, 2026	1	2:54	Charleville-Mézières, France	Won the vacant ADS Middleweight Championship.
Loss	11–7	Vincent del Guerra	TKO (front kick to the body and punches)	PFL Europe 3 (2025)	September 26, 2025	3	0:24	Nantes, France	
Win	11–6	Nikola Zlatev	TKO (retirement)	Ultimate Cage France 4	February 1, 2025	3	N/A	Lille, France	
Loss	10–6	Gheorghe Gritko	Submission	Arène des Sacres 6	May 25, 2024	1	1:25	Charleville-Mézières, France	For the vacant ADS Middleweight Championship.
Win	10–5	Dragan Pesic	Submission (guillotine choke)	KCC 1	May 13, 2023	1	0:20	Dijon, France	
Win	9–5	Maxim Soroka	Decision (split)	L'Arène de Sacres 3	January 29, 2023	3	5:00	Les Mazures, France	Defended the ADS Welterweight Championship.
Loss	8–5	Frankie Rollandt	Decision (unanimous)	Fight Surpass 2	September 24, 2022	3	5:00	Roubaix, France	Middleweight debut.
Win	8–4	Jean Dutriaux	Submission (armbar)	Hexagone MMA 3	February 26, 2022	1	4:32	Reims, France	Catchweight (183 lb) bout.
Win	7–4	Said Elderbiev	Submission (rear-naked choke)	Road to ONE: MMA Live 8	July 17, 2021	1	3:52	Riesa, Germany	
Loss	6–4	Badreddine Diani	TKO (punches)	UAE Warriors 19	June 18, 2021	2	1:27	Abu Dhabi, United Arab Emirates	
Win	6–3	Ruslan Heleshko	KO (body kick)	L'Arène de Sacres 3	February 29, 2020	1	2:45	Reims, France	Won the vacant ADS Welterweight Championship.
Win	5–3	Dimitri Henri	Submission (armbar)	100% Fight 39	April 20, 2019	1	1:10	Paris, France	
Win	4–3	Romain Debienne	Submission (armbar)	L'Arène des Sacres 1	February 3, 2018	2	3:45	Reims, France	
Loss	3–3	Walid Laidi	Decision (unanimous)	100% Fight 33	January 18, 2018	2	5:00	Paris, France	
Win	3–2	Said Al Hamid	Submission (armbar)	100% Fight 32	November 25, 2017	1	1:29	Paris, France	
Win	2–2	Sami Kodass	Decision (unanimous)	Next Level 2	October 28, 2017	2	5:00	Mantes-la-Ville, France	
Loss	1–2	Romain Bidet	Submission (ankle lock)	KOC: Prestige Edition	February 11, 2017	1	2:19	Bordeaux, France	
Loss	1–1	Abdoul Abdouraguimov	Submission (rear-naked choke)	100% Fight: Contenders 33	November 26, 2016	1	2:21	Paris, France	100% Fight Welterweight Tournament Final.
Win	1–0	Uriel Loutina	Decision (unanimous)	100% Fight: Contenders 33	November 26, 2016	2	5:00	Paris, France	Welterweight debut. 100% Fight Welterweight Tournament Semifinal.

== See also ==
- List of male mixed martial artists
