= PFL MENA 3 (2025) =

Professional Fighters League MMA event in 2025

- The poster for PFL MENA 3
- Promotion: Professional Fighters League
- Date: September 27, 2025
- Venue: The Arena Riyadh Venue for Exhibitions
- City: Riyadh, Saudi Arabia

Event chronology
PFL Europe 3	PFL MENA 3	PFL Champions Series 3

PFL MENA 3: Champions Collide was a mixed martial arts event produced by the Professional Fighters League that took place on September 27, 2025, at The Arena Riyadh Venue for Exhibitions in Riyadh, Saudi Arabia.

== Background ==
The event was featured the semifinals of 2025 PFL MENA Tournament in a welterweight, lightweight, featherweight and bantamweight divisions.

At the weigh-ins, Assem Ghanem missed weight for his featherweight semifinal against Yanis Ghemmouri and was replaced by alternate Izzeddine Al Derbani, who was originally supposed to fight Hussein Salem. Additionally, the amateur flyweight bout between Hamad Marhoon and Ibrahim Chelabi has been canceled after Chelabi came in overweight.

== Results ==
Main card (DAZN / PFL App)
Weight class				Method	Round	Time	Notes
Welterweight	Mohammad Alaqraa	def.	Ayman Galal	TKO (leg kick)	1	0:21	(Note: 2025 PFL MENA Welterweight Tournament Semifinal.)
Lightweight	Mohammad Fahmi	def.	Mohsen Mohammadseifi	Submission (rear-naked choke)	1	4:25	(Note: 2025 PFL MENA Lightweight Tournament Semifinal.)
Flyweight	Malik Basahel	def.	Ahmed Mostafa	Submission (rear-naked choke)	2	1:54
Bantamweight	Islam Youssef	def.	Xavier Alaoui	Decision (unanimous) (30–27, 30–27, 29–28)	3	5:00	(Note: 2025 PFL MENA Bantamweight Tournament Semifinal.)
Lightweight	Salah Eddine Hamli	def.	Souhil Taïri	Submission (arm-triangle choke)	3	1:30	(Note: 2025 PFL MENA Lightweight Tournament Semifinal.)
Featherweight	Islam Reda	def.	Taha Bendaoud	Decision (unanimous) (30–26, 30–26, 30–27)	3	5:00	(Note: 2025 PFL MENA Featherweight Tournament Semifinal.)
Preliminary card (DAZN / PFL App)
Catchweight (160 lb)	Hassan Ahmed Moustafa	def.	Abdulaziz bin Moammar	Decision (split) (29–28, 28–29, 29–28)	3	3:00	(Note: Amateur bout.)
Bantamweight	Nawras Abzakh	def.	Moktar Benkaci	Decision (unanimous) (29–27, 29–27, 30–26)	3	5:00	(Note: 2025 PFL MENA Bantamweight Tournament Semifinal. Benkaci was deducted one point in round 2 due to an illegal elbows.)
Welterweight	Badreddine Diani	def.	Amir Fazli	Decision (split) (30–27, 28–29, 29–28)	3	5:00	(Note: 2025 PFL MENA Welterweight Tournament Semifinal.)
Featherweight	Yanis Ghemmouri	def.	Izzeddine Al Derbani	Decision (unanimous) (30–27, 29–28, 29–28)	3	5:00	(Note: 2025 PFL MENA Featherweight Tournament Semifinal.)

== Tournament brackets ==
=== 2025 PFL MENA Welterweight Tournament ===
Quarter-finals
(Palestine) Omar Hussein	3
(Kuwait) Mohammad Alaqraa	UD
(Iraq) Mohamed Zarey	UD (Note: Originally a unanimous decision (29–28, 29–28, 29–28) win for Zarey, overturned after he tested positive for banned substances. Galal advanced to semifinals instead.)
(Egypt) Ayman Galal	3
(Morocco) Badreddine Diani	UD
(Egypt) Ahmad Abdelbast Darwish	3
(Turkey) Rostem Akman	2
(Iran) Amir Fazli	KO

Semi-finals
(Kuwait) Mohammad Alaqraa	TKO
(Egypt) Ayman Galal	1
(Morocco) Badreddine Diani	SD
(Iran) Amir Fazli	3

Final
(Kuwait) Mohammad Alaqraa
(Morocco) Badreddine Diani

=== 2025 PFL MENA Lightweight Tournament ===
Quarter-finals
(Iran) Mohsen Mohammadseifi	UD
(Egypt) Ahmed El Sisy	3
(Lebanon) Georges Eid	1
(Iraq) Mohammad Fahmi	SUB
(Morocco) Salah Eddine Hamli	SUB
(Bahrain) Abbas Khan	3
(Kuwait) Abdullah Saleem	TKO
(Algeria) Souhil Taïri	2

Semi-finals
(Iran) Mohsen Mohammadseifi	1
(Iraq) Mohammad Fahmi	SUB
(Morocco) Salah Eddine Hamli	SUB
(Algeria) Souhil Taïri	3

Final
(Iraq) Mohammad Fahmi
(Morocco) Salah Eddine Hamli

=== 2025 PFL MENA Featherweight Tournament ===
Quarter-finals
(Algeria) Akram Nasri (Note: Abdullah Al-Qahtani withdrew from the tournament due to injury and was replaced by Akram Nasri.)	3
(Egypt) Islam Reda	SUB
(Algeria) Drissi Boualem (Note: Abdelrahman Alhyasat withdrew from the tournament due to weight cut issues and was replaced by Drissi Boualem.)	1
(Morocco) Taha Bendaoud	SUB
(Jordan) Izzeddine Al-Derbani	–
(Algeria) Yanis Ghemmouri	BYE (Note: Al Derbani pulled out of the bout due to medical issues and Ghemmouri therefore got a bye to the semi-finals.)
(Iraq) Hussein Salem	3
(Egypt) Assem Ghanem	UD

Semi-finals
(Egypt) Islam Reda	UD
(Morocco) Taha Bendaoud	3
(Algeria) Yanis Ghemmouri	UD
(Jordan) Izzeddine Al-Derbani (Note: Assem Ghanem missed weight and was replaced by Al-Derbani.)	3

Final
(Egypt) Islam Reda
(Algeria) Yanis Ghemmouri

=== 2025 PFL MENA Bantamweight Tournament ===
Quarter-finals
(Morocco) Xavier Alaoui	UD
(Egypt) Ziad Ayman Mokhtar	3
(Iran) Benyamin Ghahraman (Note: Elias Boudegzdame withdrew from the tournament and was replaced by Benyamin Ghahraman.)	2
(Egypt) Islam Youssef (Note: Tariq Ismail withdrew from the tournament due to injury and was replaced by Mehdi Saadi. In turn, Saadi withdrew from the event due to significantly missing weight and was replaced by alternate Islam Youssef.)	KO
(Algeria) Moktar Benkaci	TKO
(Lebanon) Marcel Adur	1
(Jordan) Nawras Abzakh	KO
(Lebanon) Ali Yazbeck	2

Semi-finals
(Morocco) Xavier Alaoui	3
(Egypt) Islam Youssef	UD
(Algeria) Moktar Benkaci	3
(Jordan) Nawras Abzakh	UD

Final
(Egypt) Islam Youssef
(Jordan) Nawras Abzakh

== See also ==
- 2025 in Professional Fighters League
- List of PFL events
- List of current PFL fighters
