= PFL MENA 2 (2024) =

Mixed martial arts event

- The poster for PFL MENA 2
- Promotion: Professional Fighters League
- Date: July 12, 2024
- Venue: The Green Halls
- City: Riyadh, Saudi Arabia

Event chronology
PFL 6	PFL MENA 2	PFL 7

PFL MENA 2 was a mixed martial arts event produced by the Professional Fighters League that took place on July 12, 2024, at The Green Halls in Riyadh, Saudi Arabia.

== Background ==
This event marked the quarterfinals of the 2024 PFL MENA tournament in a welterweight and lightweight divisions. The event also marks the promotion's third card held in Saudi Arabia and first since PFL MENA 1 (2024) in May 2024.

== Results ==
Main card (DAZN)
Weight class				Method	Round	Time	Notes
Middleweight	Mostafa Rashed Neda	def.	Abdel Rahmane Driai	KO (punch)	1	2:34
Welterweight	Mohammad Alaqraa	def.	Youcef Ouabbas	TKO (punches)	3	0:53	(Note: 2024 PFL MENA Welterweight Tournament Quarterfinal.)
Welterweight	Jarrah Al-Silawi	def.	Rayan Atmani	Submission (rear-naked choke)	1	4:20	(Note: 2024 PFL MENA Welterweight Tournament Quarterfinal.)
Welterweight	Badreddine Diani	def.	Amir Fazli	Decision (unanimous) (30–27, 30–27, 29–28)	3	5:00	(Note: 2024 PFL MENA Welterweight Tournament Quarterfinal.)
Lightweight	Mohsen Mohammadseifi	def.	Josh Togo	TKO (punches)	1	3:33	(Note: 2024 PFL MENA Lightweight Tournament Quarterfinal.)
Preliminary card (DAZN)
Lightweight	Souhil Tahiri	def.	Ahmed Amir	Decision (unanimous) (29–27, 29–27, 29–27)	3	5:00	(Note: 2024 PFL MENA Lightweight Tournament Quarterfinal. Tahiri had a point deducted for an illegal knee.)
Welterweight	Omar El Dafrawy	def.	Anthony Zeidan	Decision (unanimous) (30–25, 30–26, 30–27)	3	5:00	(Note: 2024 PFL MENA Welterweight Tournament Quarterfinal.)
Women's Atomweight	Hattan Alsaif	def.	Eman Baraka	TKO (retirement)	2	3:00	(Note: Amateur bout.)
Lightweight	Abdullah Saleem	vs.	Omar Reguigui	NC (overturned)	1	1:30	(Note: 2024 PFL MENA Lightweight Tournament Quarterfinal. Originally a submission (triangle choke) win for Saleem; overturned after he failed an in-competition drug test.)
Lightweight	Georges Eid	def.	Abbas Khan	Decision (unanimous) (30–27, 30–27, 30–27)	3	5:00	(Note: 2024 PFL MENA Lightweight Tournament Quarterfinal.)
Flyweight	Ziad Ayman Mokhtar	def.	Hadi Al-Hussaini	Submission (rear-naked choke)	3	4:24

== Brackets ==
=== Welterweight ===
Quarter-finals
(Egypt) Omar El-Dafrawy	UD
(Lebanon) Anthony Zeidan	3r.
(Jordan) Jarrah Hussein Al-Silawi	SUB
(Algeria) Rayan Atmani	1r.
(Iran) Amir Fazli	3r.
(Morocco) Badreddine Diani	UD
(Kuwait) Mohammad Alaqraa	TKO
(France) Youcef Ouabbas	3r.

Semi-finals
(Egypt) Omar El-Dafrawy
(Jordan) Jarrah Hussein Al-Silawi
(Morocco) Badreddine Diani
(Kuwait) Mohammad Alaqraa

Final

=== Lightweight ===
Quarter-finals
(Egypt) Ahmed Amir	3r.
(France) Souhil Tahiri	UD
(Lebanon) Josh Togo	1r.
(Iran) Mohsen Mohammadseifi	TKO
(Lebanon) Georges Eid	UD
(Pakistan) Abbas Khan	3r.
(Kuwait) Abdullah Saleem	1r.
(Tunisia) Omar Reguigui (Note: Originally a submission (triangle choke) win for Saleem; overturned after he failed an in-competition drug test, Reguigui advanced to semifinal.)	NC

Semi-finals
(France) Souhil Tahiri
(Iran) Mohsen Mohammadseifi
(Lebanon) Georges Eid
(Tunisia) Omar Reguigui

Final

== See also ==
- List of PFL events
- List of current PFL fighters
