= Jan Ciepłowski =

Polish mixed martial artist (born 1999)

- Born: Jan Ciepłowski; 28 April 1999 (age 27); Łódź, Poland
- Other names: Jasiu
- Height: 5 ft 8 in (1.73 m)
- Weight: 135 lb (61 kg; 9 st 9 lb)
- Division: Bantamweight (2021–present)
- Reach: 65 in (165 cm)
- Style: Brazilian Jiu-jitsu
- Fighting out of: Łódź, Poland
- Team: Octopus Łódź; Fight Factor Łódź
- Rank: Brown belt in Brazilian Jiu-jitsu
- Years active: 2021–present

Mixed martial arts record
- Total: 12
- Wins: 11
- By knockout: 4
- By submission: 2
- By decision: 4
- By disqualification: 1
- Losses: 1
- By knockout: 0
- By submission: 1
- By decision: 0

Other information
- Mixed martial arts record from Sherdog

Jan Ciepłowski (born 28 April 1999) is a Polish professional mixed martial artist. He currently competes in the Bantamweight division of DWM Fight Night. He has previously competed under Professional Fighters League (PFL) and Fight Exclusive Night (FEN MMA).

== Professional career ==
=== Early career ===
Ciepłowski made his professional debut on May 8, 2021, against Kamil Korzeniowski. Ciepłowski won the fight via a Unanimous Decision.

His next fight came on November 5, 2021, against Jensug Gogua. Ciepłowski won the fight via a first-round TKO.

His next fight came on February 26, 2022, against Marcin Maleszewski. Ciepłowski won the fight via a first-round submission.

His next fight came on June 18, 2022, against Patrik Martinik. Ciepłowski won the fight via a second-round disqualification, following a series of illegal elbows to the back of the head.

=== Cage Glory Championship ===
Ciepłowski made his debut under Cypriot federation Cage Glory Championship on March 25, 2023, against Karlen Minasyan. Ciepłowski won the fight via a Unanimous Decision.

=== Fight Exclusive Night ===
Ciepłowski made his debut under Fight Exclusive Night (FEN MMA) on February 17, 2024, against Lukáš Chotěnovský. Ciepłowski won the fight via a Unanimous Decision.

His next fight came on May 17, 2024, against Thiago Nogueira. Ciepłowski won the fight via a first-round submission.

His next fight came on November 23, 2024, against Vitalii Yakymenko. Ciepłowski won the fight via a Split Decision.

=== Professional Fighters League ===
On April 5, 2025, it was announced that Ciepłowski had signed with Professional Fighters League (PFL).

His debut was scheduled for May 23, 2025, on the undercard of PFL Paris 2025 against Julien Lopez in the first round of the 2025 PFL Europe Bantamweight Tournament. The event was later cancelled, meaning he would have to wait for his debut.

His debut finally came on July 5, 2025, on the undercard of PFL Europe 2 (2025), facing Julien Lopez. Ciepłowski won the fight via a first-round TKO, advancing to the next round in the process.

His next fight came on September 26, 2025, on the undercard of PFL Europe 3 (2025) in the semifinal of the tournament, facing Dean Garnett. Ciepłowski lost the fight via a third-round submission, losing his first professional fight, and being eliminated from the tournament.

=== DWM Fight Night ===
On May 23, 2026, it was announced that Ciepłowski signed with Polish federation DWM Fight Night. His debut came on July 25, 2026, against Reimison Saraiva. Ciepłowski won the fight via a first-round knockout.

== Personal life ==
Ciepłowski is an avid supporter of his hometown football club ŁKS Łódź.

=== 2025 arrest ===
Ciepłowski, alongside five other hooligans of ŁKS Łódź were arrested on October 21, 2025, on suspicion of smuggling in half a ton of drugs into trading, with them facing possibly up to 15 years in prison. Ciepłowski was released from arrest on April 4, 2026, after no sufficient evidence was found.

== Mixed martial arts record ==
Professional record breakdown
11 matches	10 wins	1 loss
By knockout	3	0
By submission	2	1
By decision	4	0
By disqualification	1	0

Res.	Record	Opponent	Method	Event	Date	Round	Time	Location	Notes
Win	11–1	Deiby Tachon	KO (punch)	King's Arena 4	October 3, 2026	1	4:03	Łódź, Poland	
Win	10–1	Reimison Saraiva	KO (punches)	DWM Fight Night 10	July 25, 2026	1	1:52	Gliwice, Poland	Catchweight (139 lb) bout.
Loss	9–1	Dean Garnett	Submission (guillotine choke)	PFL Europe 3 (2025)	September 26, 2025	3	0:38	Nantes, France	2025 PFL Europe Bantamweight Tournament semifinal.
Win	9–0	Julien Lopez	TKO (punches)	PFL Europe 2 (2025)	July 5, 2025	1	3:43	Brussels, Belgium	2025 PFL Europe Bantamweight Tournament quarterfinal.
Win	8–0	Vitalii Yakymenko	Decision (split)	Fight Exclusive Night 57	November 23, 2024	3	5:00	Piotrków Trybunalski, Poland	
Win	7–0	Thiago Nogueira	Submission (rear-naked choke)	Fight Exclusive Night 54	May 17, 2024	1	1:16	Piła, Poland	
Win	6–0	Lukáš Chotěnovský	Decision (unanimous)	Fight Exclusive Night 52	February 17, 2024	3	5:00	Ostrów Wielkopolski, Poland	
Win	5–0	Karlen Minasyan	Decision (unanimous)	Cage Glory Championship 3	March 25, 2023	3	5:00	Larnaca, Cyprus	
Win	4–0	Patrik Martinik	DQ (illegal elbows)	Armia Fight Night 13	June 18, 2022	2	3:10	Łódź, Poland	Illegal elbows rendered Ciepłowski unable to continue.
Win	3–0	Marcin Maleszewski	Submission (rear-naked choke)	Armia Fight Night 12	February 26, 2022	1	1:30	Gliwice, Poland	
Win	2–0	Jensug Gogua	TKO (punches)	Armia Fight Night 11	November 5, 2021	1	2:00	Łódź, Poland	
Win	1–0	Kamil Korzeniowski	Decision (unanimous)	Armia Fight Night Special Edition	May 8, 2021	3	5:00	Łódź, Poland	Bantamweight debut.

== See also ==
- List of male mixed martial artists
