= Davion Franklin =

American mixed martial arts fighter

- Born: June 21, 1994 (age 32); Chicago, Illinois, United States
- Other names: All Day
- Height: 6 ft 3 in (1.91 m)
- Weight: 265 lb (120 kg; 18 st 13 lb)
- Division: Heavyweight
- Reach: 80 in (203 cm)
- Fighting out of: Albuquerque, New Mexico
- Team: Jackson Wink MMA Academy
- Years active: 2020–present

Mixed martial arts record
- Total: 8
- Wins: 6
- By knockout: 3
- By submission: 0
- By decision: 3
- Losses: 2
- By knockout: 1
- By submission: 1

Other information
- Mixed martial arts record from Sherdog

Davion Robby Franklin (born June 21, 1994) is an American mixed martial artist competing in Bellator MMA. Signed directly to Bellator without amateur experience, Franklin fought his first eight Mixed Martial Arts bouts within the promotion.

== Mixed martial arts career ==
=== Signing with Bellator MMA ===
A recipient of the Jackson Wink/Mata Leon scholarship in 2019, Franklin signed with Bellator after just 7 months of training in mixed-rules. His MMA debut was scheduled for November 19, 2019, at Bellator 233: Salter vs. van Steenis at the WinStar World Casino in Thackerville, Oklahoma, but the intended opponent, Christian Adams, withdrew due to injury.

=== Bellator 239 ===
In January, 2020 it was revealed Franklin's MMA debut had been rescheduled for the Bellator 239: Ruth vs Amosov prelims at the WinStar World Casino in Thackerville, Oklahoma February 21 vs JW Kiser, who had a 5-2 professional record and was coming off 4 straight wins. The fight lasted just 100 seconds, with Franklin's ground and pound finishing the contest. The prelim bouts aired on Bellator's YouTube channel.

=== Bellator 246 ===
Franklin made his return to the cage on the Bellator 246: Mix vs Archuleta prelims at Mohegan Sun Arena in Uncasville, Connecticut September 12, 2020, vs Ras Hylton. Franklin weighed in at 264.7 lbs, Hylton at 245.5 At 3:23 in the third round, inadvertent strikes to the back of the head in a ground and pound situation stopped the fight, and prompted a technical decision, with all three judges scoring the fight for Franklin (30–27, 30–27, 30–27). The bout aired on Bellator's YouTube channel.

=== Bellator 259 ===
Franklin was next booked to fight Anthony Garrett at Bellator 254: Macfarlane vs Velasquez on December 10 but Garrett wasn't cleared medically and the fight fell through. Franklin's next bout would instead take place at Bellator 259: Cyborg vs Smith 2 May 21, 2021, at the Mohegan Sun Arena in Uncasville, Connecticut, versus Tyler King. Franklin - who was a massive favorite to win- weighed in at 264.8 lbs, King at 246.3 lbs. In the bout, Franklin dominated on the feet and stopped King in 122 seconds.

=== Bellator 264 ===
Franklin's next cage appearance would take place on the main card of Bellator 264: Mousasi vs Salter on August 13, 2021. He was matched with then undefeated (15-0) Everett Cummings. By fight time Franklin was a fairly heavy favorite to win and made short work of his opponent, getting the KO in just 21 seconds. The main card aired on Showtime but the full fight has since been made available on Bellator's Youtube channel.

=== Bellator 274 ===
Following his opening-seconds destruction of Cummings, Franklin was booked to face Said Sowma on the main card of Bellator 274: Gracie vs. Storley February 19, 2022, at the Mohegan Sun Arena in Uncasville, Connecticut. At the time of the booking, Franklin and Sowma were tied at number 8 in the official Bellator rankings, with Franklin a slight betting underdog by fight-time. Sowma was coming into the fight off an upset win over the ex-champion Vitaly Minakov (via injury TKO). In the fight Franklin was the aggressor, while Sowma largely employed an elusive strategy, firing off numerous low kicks in an attempt to score points while trying to evade Franklin's heavy artillery. Sowma also attempted to stuff Franklin into the cage at times to mute his attack but had limited success keeping him there. After 3 rounds, Franklin (who had landed the heavier shots) was awarded the split decision win (30–27, 29–28, 28–29)

=== Bellator 283 ===
Franklin was next scheduled to face Daniel James at Bellator 280: Bader vs Kongo 2 at the Accor Arena in Paris, France May 6, 2022 but the fight was cancelled after James tested positive for a banned substance. Franklin was rebooked for Bellator 283: Lima vs Jackson July 22, 2022, at Emerald Queen Casino and Hotel in Tacoma, Washington, this time versus Marcelo Golm. Franklin weighed in at 264.2, Golm at 257.6. Franklin was a slight favorite heading into the bout After a back and forth fight Franklin would suffer his first pro defeat when Golm secured a submission with just 24 seconds left in the fight. The bout aired on Showtime in the US.

=== Bellator 295 ===
Franklin returned to the cage April 22, 2023, at Bellator 295: Stots vs Mix at the Neal S. Blaisdell Arena in Honolulu, Hawaii, versus promotional newcomer Kasim Aras, a former freestyle wrestler-turned mixed-martial artist. Aras came into the fight with a 7–1 professional record with three consecutive wins. Franklin was a fairly significant betting favorite to win. Franklin weighed in at 259.2 lbs for the fight, Aras at 251.8 lbs. After 3 rounds of action, Franklin was awarded a unanimous decision win (29–29, 29–28, 29–28). The prelims aired on Bellator's Youtube channel.

=== Bellator 300 ===
Franklin was next scheduled to face undefeated promotional newcomer Slim Trabelsi on the prelims of Bellator 300 Saturday October 7, at Pechanga Arena in San Diego, California. Franklin lost via TKO (leg injury) at 3:09 of round 1.

=== PFL 4 ===
On May 20, 2024, it was announced that Franklin was replacing Marcelo Nunes against Oleg Popov at PFL 4 for Professional Fighters League. After missing weight, Franklin lost to Popov by unanimous decision.

== Mixed martial arts record ==
Professional record breakdown
9 matches	6 wins	3 losses
By knockout	3	1
By submission	0	1
By decision	3	1

Res.	Record	Opponent	Method	Event	Date	Round	Time	Location	Notes
Loss	6–3	Oleg Popov	Decision (unanimous)	PFL 4 (2024)	June 13, 2024	3	5:00	Uncasville, Connecticut, United States	Catchweight (268.5 lb) bout; Franklin missed weight.
Loss	6–2	Slim Trabelsi	TKO (leg injury)	Bellator 300	October 7, 2023	1	3:09	San Diego, California, United States	
Win	6–1	Kasim Aras	Decision (unanimous)	Bellator 295	April 22, 2023	3	5:00	Honolulu, Hawaii, United States	
Loss	5–1	Marcelo Golm	Submission (rear-naked choke)	Bellator 283	July 22, 2022	3	4:36	Tacoma, Washington, United States	
Win	5–0	Said Sowma	Decision (split)	Bellator 274	February 19, 2022	3	5:00	Uncasville, Connecticut, United States	
Win	4–0	Everett Cummings	TKO (punches)	Bellator 264	August 13, 2021	1	0:21	Uncasville, Connecticut, United States	
Win	3–0	Tyler King	KO (punches)	Bellator 259	May 21, 2021	1	2:02	Uncasville, Connecticut, United States	
Win	2–0	Ras Hylton	Technical Decision (unanimous)	Bellator 246	September 12, 2020	3	3:23	Uncasville, Connecticut, United States	Accidental punch to back of the head rendered Hylton unable to continue.
Win	1–0	JW Kiser	TKO (punches)	Bellator 239	February 21, 2020	1	1:40	Thackerville, Oklahoma, United States	Heavyweight debut.

== See also ==
- List of current Bellator fighters
- List of male mixed martial artists
