= Paulina Wiśniewska =

Polish mixed martial artist (born 1998)

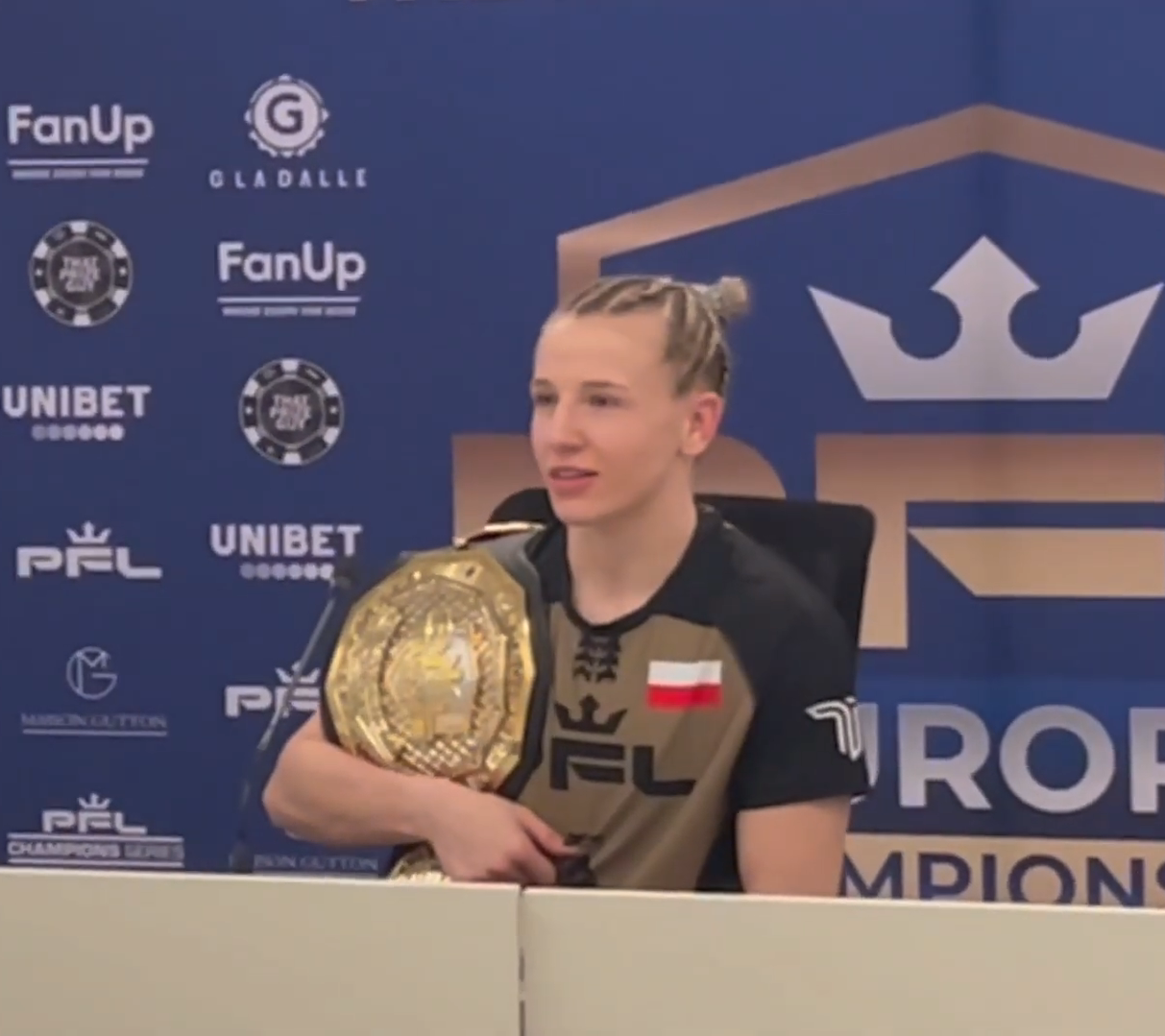
- Born: November 27, 1998 (age 27); Olsztyn, Poland
- Height: 168 cm (5 ft 6 in)
- Weight: 125 lb (57 kg; 8 st 13 lb)
- Division: Flyweight
- Reach: 68.5 in (174 cm)
- Fighting out of: Ostróda, Poland
- Team: MMA Team Ostróda
- Years active: 2023–present

Mixed martial arts record
- Total: 9
- Wins: 8
- By knockout: 3
- By submission: 1
- By decision: 4
- Losses: 1
- By decision: 1

Other information
- Mixed martial arts record from Sherdog

Paulina Wiśniewska (born November 27, 1998) is a Polish professional mixed martial artist who competes in the women's flyweight division of the Professional Fighters League (PFL). She won the 2024 PFL Europe Women's Flyweight Championship. As of April 21, 2026, she is #4 in the PFL women's flyweight rankings. As an amateur, she is a two-time bronze medalist of the IMMAF World Championships in the flyweight category in 2021 and 2022.

== Background ==
Wiśniewska was born in Olsztyn, but moved to Ostróda, where she resides.

== Professional mixed martial arts career ==
=== Early career ===
Wiśniewska made her professional MMA debut on September 22, 2023, under Babilon MMA at Babilon MMA 38 facing Dominika Steczkowska. She won the bout by unanimous decision.

In the second fight during Strife Tube 3, which took place on February 16, 2024, in Radom, Wiśniewska fought the more experienced Kinga Jędrasik. She again won the bout by unanimous decision.

=== Professional Fighters League ===
==== 2024 season ====
In April 2024, Wiśniewska signed a contract with the American league Professional Fighters League. Her debut took place on June 8, 2024, in the quarterfinal fight of the European women's flyweight tournament at PFL Europe 2, facing Dee Begley. She won the bout by TKO in the second round.

In the European women's flyweight semifinal, Wiśniewska faced Karolina Wójcik on September 28, 2024, at PFL Europe 3. She won the bout by unanimous decision, advancing to the final.

In the final fight at the PFL Europe Women's Flyweight Tournament, Wiśniewska was scheduled to face Shanelle Dyer on December 14, 2024, at PFL Europe 4. However, Dyer withdrew due to injury and was replaced by Valentina Scatizzi. She won the bout by technical knockout in 20 seconds. Wiśniewska became the first Polish woman to become the champion of the PFL and the first Polish flyweight tournament winner. Additionally, she won $100,000.

==== 2025 season ====
Wiśniewska faced Jessica Cunha on July 5, 2025, at PFL Europe 2. She won the bout in the first round by submission with a rear-naked choke.

Wiśniewska faced Sabrina de Sousa on December 13, 2025, at PFL Champions Series 4. She lost the bout by split decision.

==== 2026 season ====
Wiśniewska faced Kana Watanabe on April 11, 2026, at PFL Chicago: Pettis vs. McKee. She won the bout via TKO in the second round.

Wiśniewska faced Chelsea Hackett on October 16, 2026, at PFL Chicago 2. She won the fight via unanimous decision.

== Championships and accomplishments ==
- Professional Fighters League
  - 2024 PFL Europe Women's Flyweight Championship

== Mixed martial arts record ==
Professional record breakdown
| 9 matches | 8 wins | 1 loss |
| By knockout | 3 | 0 |
| By submission | 1 | 0 |
| By decision | 4 | 1 |

| Res. | Record | Opponent | Method | Event | Date | Round | Time | Location | Notes |
|---|---|---|---|---|---|---|---|---|---|
| Win | 8–1 | Chelsea Hackett | Decision (unanimous) | PFL Chicago: Carmouche vs. Bishop 2 | October 16, 2026 | 3 | 5:00 | Chicago, Illinois, United States | |
| Win | 7–1 | Kana Watanabe | TKO (elbows) | PFL Chicago: Pettis vs. McKee | April 11, 2026 | 2 | 3:15 | Chicago, Illinois, United States | |
| Loss | 6–1 | Sabrina de Sousa | Decision (split) | PFL Lyon: Nemkov vs. Ferreira | December 13, 2025 | 3 | 5:00 | Décines-Charpieu, France | |
| Win | 6–0 | Jessica Cunha | Submission (rear-naked choke) | PFL Europe 2 (2025) | July 5, 2025 | 1 | 4:12 | Brussels, Belgium | |
| Win | 5–0 | Valentina Scatizzi | TKO (knee and punches) | PFL Europe 4 (2024) | December 14, 2024 | 1 | 0:20 | Décines-Charpieu, France | Won the 2024 PFL Europe Women's Flyweight Tournament. |
| Win | 4–0 | Karolina Wójcik | Decision (unanimous) | PFL Europe 3 (2024) | September 28, 2024 | 3 | 5:00 | Glasgow, Scotland | 2024 PFL Europe Women's Flyweight Tournament Semifinal. |
| Win | 3–0 | Dee Begley | TKO (punches) | PFL Europe 2 (2024) | June 8, 2024 | 2 | 3:08 | Newcastle, England | 2024 PFL Europe Women's Flyweight Tournament Quarterfinal; Begley missed weight (130.3 lb). |
| Win | 2–0 | Kinga Jendrasik | Decision (unanimous) | Strife Tube 3 | February 16, 2024 | 3 | 5:00 | Radom, Poland | |
| Win | 1–0 | Dominika Steczkowska | Decision (unanimous) | Babilon MMA 38 | September 22, 2023 | 3 | 5:00 | Chełm, Poland | Flyweight debut. |

== See also ==
- List of female mixed martial artists
- List of current PFL fighters
