= Marcelo Golm =

Brazilian mixed martial arts fighter

- Born: 15 September 1992 (age 34); Santos, São Paulo, Brazil
- Height: 6 ft 3 in (1.91 m)
- Weight: 250 lb (113 kg; 17 st 12 lb)
- Division: Heavyweight
- Reach: 75.5 in (192 cm)
- Fighting out of: Sao Paulo, Sao Paulo, Brazil
- Team: Corinthians MMA (until 2018); Team Nogueira; American Top Team (2018–present)
- Years active: 2015–present

Mixed martial arts record
- Total: 16
- Wins: 10
- By knockout: 7
- By submission: 3
- Losses: 6
- By knockout: 3
- By decision: 3

Other information
- Mixed martial arts record from Sherdog

Marcelo Golm (born 15 September 1992) is a Brazilian mixed martial artist who competes in the Heavyweight division. He has previously competed in Bellator MMA and the Ultimate Fighting Championship (UFC).

== Mixed martial arts career ==
=== Early career ===
Starting his career in 2015, Golm acquired a 5–0 record fighting around regional Brazilian promotions, winning all the fights by knockout.

=== Ultimate Fighting Championship ===
Golm made his UFC debut against Christian Colombo on 28 October 2017, at UFC Fight Night: Brunson vs. Machida. He won the fight via submission in the first round.

Golm faced Timothy Johnson on 3 February 2018, at UFC Fight Night 125. He lost the fight via unanimous decision.

For his third fight with the promotion, Golm faced Arjan Bhullar on 27 October 2018, at UFC Fight Night 138. He lost the fight via unanimous decision. After the fight, Golm became a free agent and eventually re-signed with the UFC.

Golm faced Sergei Pavlovich on 20 April 2019, at UFC Fight Night: Overeem vs. Oleinik. He lost the fight via first-round knockout.

After losing three fights in a row, Golm was released from the UFC.

=== Post-UFC career ===
After his release, Golm signed with Taura MMA. In his promotional debut he faced DJ Linderman at Taura MMA 11 on 30 October 2020. Golm won the fight via first-round technical knockout.

Golm then faced Brandon Hebert at XMMA 1 on 30 January 2021. He won the fight via second-round submission.

=== Bellator MMA ===
Golm signed to a multi-fight deal with Bellator MMA.

Golm was expected to make his promotional debut against Linton Vassell on 16 July 2021, at Bellator 262. On 12 July, the bout was scratched after Vassell suffered an injury.

Golm was scheduled to face Steve Mowry on 13 August 2021, at Bellator 264. However, on 4 August, it was announced that Mowry was scratched from the bout, with Golm rescheduled to face Kelvin Tiller on 20 August at Bellator 265. The week of the event, Tiller pulled out of the bout and was replaced by promotional newcomer Billy Swanson. Golm won the fight via technical knockout in round one.

Golm faced Davion Franklin on July 22, 2022, at Bellator 283. He won the bout via rear-naked choke at the end of the third round.

Golm faced Daniel James on March 31, 2023, at Bellator 293. He lost the fight via technical knockout in the third round.

Golm was scheduled to face Tyrell Fortune on November 17, 2023, at Bellator 301. Despite both men weighing in, the bout was cancelled the night of the event after Fourtune became ill backstage.

=== PFL ===
Golm debuted with the Professional Fighters League (PFL) at PFL 1 on April 4, 2024, and lost the bout in a rematch against Daniel James by technical knockout at the end of the first round. James missed weight, so he was fined a percentage of his purse and given a point deduction in the standings.

Golm faced Tyrell Fortune at PFL 4 on June 13, 2024. He lost the bout via unanimous decision.

== Mixed martial arts record ==
Professional record breakdown
16 matches	10 wins	6 losses
By knockout	7	3
By submission	3	0
By decision	0	3

Res.	Record	Opponent	Method	Event	Date	Round	Time	Location	Notes
Loss	10–6	Tyrell Fortune	Decision (unanimous)	PFL 4 (2024)	13 June 2024	3	5:00	Uncasville, Connecticut, United States	
Loss	10–5	Daniel James	TKO (punches)	PFL 1 (2024)	4 April 2024	1	4:59	San Antonio, Texas, United States	Catchweight (267 lb) bout; James missed weight.
Loss	10–4	Daniel James	TKO (punches)	Bellator 293	31 March 2023	3	0:26	Temecula, California, United States	
Win	10–3	Davion Franklin	Submission (rear-naked choke)	Bellator 283	22 July 2022	3	4:36	Tacoma, Washington, United States	
Win	9–3	Billy Swanson	TKO (punches)	Bellator 265	20 August 2021	1	4:57	Sioux Falls, South Dakota, United States	
Win	8–3	Brandon Hebert	Submission (arm-triangle choke)	XMMA: Vick vs Fialho	30 January 2021	2	1:17	Palm Beach, Florida, United States	
Win	7–3	DJ Linderman	TKO (punch)	Taura MMA 11	30 October 2020	1	1:59	Kissimmee, Florida, United States	
Loss	6–3	Sergei Pavlovich	KO (punch)	UFC Fight Night: Overeem vs. Oleinik	20 April 2019	1	1:06	St. Petersburg, Russia	
Loss	6–2	Arjan Bhullar	Decision (unanimous)	UFC Fight Night: Volkan vs. Smith	27 October 2018	3	5:00	Moncton, New Brunswick, Canada	
Loss	6–1	Timothy Johnson	Decision (unanimous)	UFC Fight Night: Machida vs. Anders	3 February 2018	3	5:00	Belém, Brazil	
Win	6–0	Christian Colombo	Submission (rear-naked choke)	UFC Fight Night: Brunson vs. Machida	28 October 2017	1	0:47	São Paulo, Brazil	
Win	5–0	Nicolas Oliveira	TKO	Demolidor Fight MMA 10	12 April 2017	1	0:18	Bauru, Brazil	
Win	4–0	Italo Marques	KO (punches)	Mr. Cage 28	1 July 2017	1	1:02	Manaus, Brazil	
Win	3–0	Marcio Pinheiro dos Santos	KO (punch)	Ichiban Kombat Championship	12 November 2016	1	2:04	Guarulhos, Brazil	
Win	2–0	Danilo Espera	TKO (punches)	Thunder Fight 4	20 June 2015	2	0:05	São Paulo, Brazil	
Win	1–0	Jhonny Pereira	TKO (punches)	Aspera FC 18	25 April 2015	1	4:33	São Paulo, Brazil	

== See also ==
- List of male mixed martial artists
