= PFL Paris 2025 (cancelled) =

Professional Fighters League MMA event in 2025

PFL Europe 2
- The poster for PFL Europe 2
- Promotion: Professional Fighters League
- Date: May 23, 2025
- Venue: Accor Arena
- City: Paris, France

Event chronology
PFL Europe 1	PFL Europe 2	PFL 5

PFL Europe 2 was a proposed mixed martial arts event scheduled to be produced by the Professional Fighters League on May 23, 2025, at the Accor Arena in Paris, France.

== Background ==
The event was to mark the promotion's third visit to Paris and first since PFL Europe 1 (2024) in March 2024. However, in early May, the organization announced that the show was cancelled.

A lightweight bout between Mansour Barnaoui and undefeated Archie Colgan was scheduled to headline the event.

This event was also to feature the quarterfinal of the 2025 PFL Europe Tournament in a bantamweight division.

Manchester United legend Patrice Evra was scheduled to makes his amateur PFL debut against opponent to be announced at this event.

== Announced card ==
Main card (DAZN)
Weight class				Method	Round	Time	Notes
Lightweight	Mansour Barnaoui	vs.	Archie Colgan
Bantamweight	Taylor Lapilus	vs.	Ali Taleb
Welterweight	Patrice Evra	vs.	TBA
Lightweight	Patrick Habirora	vs.	Nicolas Di Franco
Bantamweight	Mahio Campanella	vs.	Matiss Zaharovs				(Note: 2025 PFL Europe Bantamweight Tournament Quarterfinal.)
Bantamweight	Dean Garnett	vs.	Alexander Luster				(Note: 2025 PFL Europe Bantamweight Tournament Quarterfinal.)
Featherweight	Ibragim Ibragimov	vs.	Mathys Duragrin
Featherweight	Adam Meskini	vs.	Tiziano Ferranti
Bantamweight	Anas Azizoun	vs.	Gustavo Oliveira				(Note: 2025 PFL Europe Bantamweight Tournament Quarterfinal.)
Bantamweight	Julien Lopez	vs.	Jan Ciepłowski				(Note: 2025 PFL Europe Bantamweight Tournament Quarterfinal.)
Women's Flyweight	Paulina Wiśniewska	vs.	Borena Tsertsvadze
Welterweight	Salvo Giudice	vs.	Brice Belghazi
Featherweight	Zebenzui Ruiz	vs.	Asaël Adjoudj

== Brackets ==
=== 2025 PFL Europe Bantamweight Tournament ===
Quarter-finals
(France) Mahio Campanella
(Latvia) Matiss Zaharovs
(France) Anas Azizoun
(Portugal) Gustavo Oliveira
(England) Dean Garnett
(Germany) Alexander Luster
(Poland) Jan Ciepłowski
(France) Julien Lopez

Semi-finals

Final

== See also ==
- 2025 in Professional Fighters League
- List of PFL events
- List of current PFL fighters
