= PFL 4 (2024) =

Professional Fighters League MMA event in 2024

- The poster for PFL 4
- Promotion: Professional Fighters League
- Date: June 13, 2024
- Venue: Mohegan Sun Arena
- City: Uncasville, Connecticut, United States

Event chronology
PFL Europe 2	PFL 4	PFL 5

The PFL 4 mixed martial arts event for the 2024 season of the Professional Fighters League was held on June 13, 2024, at the Mohegan Sun Arena in Uncasville, Connecticut, United States. This marked the fourth regular-season event of the tournament and included fights in the Women's Flyweight and Heavyweight divisions.

== Background ==
The event marked the promotion's first visit to Uncasville and fourth in Connecticut state before it was rebranded promotion, since WSOF 31 in Mashantucket in June 2016.

The event was headlined by a heavyweight trilogy bout between former interim Bellator Heavyweight Champion Valentin Moldavsky and Linton Vassell. The pairing first met at Bellator 218 in March 2019, where Moldavsky won by unanimous decision. Their second meeting took place at Bellator 292 in March 2023, where Vassell won by knockout in the first round.

Roughly a month before the card there were a number of fight changes made:

- A previously announced heavyweight bout between Danilo Marques and Marcelo Nunes was cancelled as Nunes replaced former WSOF Heavyweight Champion Blagoy Ivanov against Oleg Popov and Marques replaced Steve Mowry against Gokhan Saricam; in turn, the Mowry/Saricam bout was eventually cancelled when Mowry withdrew.
- In a women's flyweight bout, former LUX Women's Strawweight Champion Saray Orozco replaced Kaytlin Neil against Sumiko Inaba.
- On May 20, it was announced that Davion Franklin was replacing Marcelo Nunes against Oleg Popov and Marcelo Golm was replacing Daniel James against Tyrell Fortune.
- Sergei Bilostenniy was expected to face Denis Goltsov in a heavyweight bout at this event, but he pulled out for unknown reason and was replaced by Thiago Santos.
- Melissa Balic was expected to face Kristina Katsikis at this event, but she withdrew due to injury and the bout was cancelled.

At weigh-ins, Davion Franklin came in at 268.5 lbs, 2.5 pounds over the heavyweight limit. He was fined a percent of his purse and given a point deduction in the standings.

== Results ==
Main card (ESPN / ESPN+)
Weight class				Method	Round	Time	Notes
Heavyweight	Linton Vassell	def.	Valentin Moldavsky	Decision (split) (29–28, 28–29, 29–28)	3	5:00
Women's Flyweight	Dakota Ditcheva	def.	Chelsea Hackett	TKO (punch to the body)	1	3:22
Heavyweight	Denis Goltsov	def.	Thiago Santos	TKO (punches)	1	2:22
Women's Flyweight	Liz Carmouche	def.	Kana Watanabe	Submission (armbar)	3	4:52
Preliminary card (ESPN+)
Women's Flyweight	Taila Santos	def.	Jena Bishop	Decision (split) (29–28, 28–29, 29–28)	3	5:00
Heavyweight	Oleg Popov	def.	Davion Franklin	Decision (unanimous) (30–27, 30–27, 30–25)	3	5:00	(Note: Franklin missed weight (268.5 lb).)
Heavyweight	Tyrell Fortune	def.	Marcelo Golm	Decision (unanimous) (30–27, 30–27, 30–26)	3	5:00
Women's Flyweight	Ilara Joanne	def.	Shanna Young	Decision (unanimous) (30–27, 30–27, 29–28)	3	5:00
Heavyweight	Timothy Johnson	def.	Danilo Marques	TKO (punches)	1	3:14
Women's Flyweight	Juliana Velasquez	def.	Lisa Mauldin	TKO (punches)	2	1:30
Women's Flyweight	Sumiko Inaba	def.	Saray Orozco	Decision (split) (29–28, 28–29, 29–28)	3	5:00

== Standings after event ==
The PFL points system is based on results of the match. The winner of a fight receives 3 points. If the fight ends in a draw, both fighters will receive 1 point. The bonus for winning a fight in the first, second, or third round is 3 points, 2 points, and 1 point respectively. The bonus for winning in the third round requires a fight be stopped before 4:59 of the third round. No bonus point will be awarded if a fighter wins via decision. For example, if a fighter wins a fight in the first round, then the fighter will receive 6 total points. A decision win will result in three total points. If a fighter misses weight, the opponent (should they comply with weight limits) will receive 3 points due to a walkover victory, regardless of winning or losing the bout; if the non-offending fighter subsequently wins with a stoppage, all bonus points will be awarded.

=== Heavyweight ===
Fighter	Wins	Draws	Losses	1st	2nd	3rd	Total Points (Note: The four fighters with most points advance to the playoffs)
♛ (Russia) Denis Goltsov	1	0	0	0	0	1	10
♛ (Russia) Oleg Popov	2	0	0	0	1	0	8
♛ (Russia) Valentin Moldavsky	1	0	1	1	0	0	6
♛ (United States) Timothy Johnson	1	0	0	1	0	0	6
E (United States) Daniel James	1	0	0	1	0	0	5
E (United States) Tyrell Fortune	1	0	0	0	0	0	3
E (Russia) Sergei Bilostenniy	1	0	0	0	0	0	3
E (England) Linton Vassell	1	0	1	0	0	0	3
E (Brazil) Thiago Santos	0	0	1	0	0	0	0
E (Bulgaria) Blagoy Ivanov	0	0	1	0	0	0	0
E (Brazil) Danilo Marques	0	0	1	0	0	0	0
E (United States) Steve Mowry	0	0	1	0	0	0	0
E (Croatia) Ante Delija	0	0	1	0	0	0	0
E (Brazil) Marcelo Golm	0	0	2	0	0	0	0
E (United States) Davion Franklin	0	0	1	0	0	0	-1

=== Women's flyweight ===
Fighter	Wins	Draws	Losses	1st	2nd	3rd	Total Points (Note: The four fighters with most points advance to the playoffs)
♛ (England) Dakota Ditcheva	2	0	0	2	0	0	12
♛ (Brazil) Taila Santos	2	0	0	1	0	0	9
♛ (United States) Liz Carmouche	2	0	0	0	0	1	7
♛ (United States) Jena Bishop	1	0	1	1	0	0	6
E (Brazil) Juliana Velasquez	1	0	1	0	1	0	5
E (Japan) Kana Watanabe	1	0	1	0	0	0	3
E (Brazil) Ilara Joanne	1	0	1	0	0	0	3
E (Australia) Chelsea Hackett	0	0	1	0	0	0	0
E (United States) Lisa Mauldin	0	0	2	0	0	0	0
E (United States) Shanna Young	0	0	2	0	0	0	-1

== See also ==
- List of PFL events
- List of current PFL fighters
