= PFL Europe 4 (2024) =

Professional Fighters League MMA event in 2024

- The poster for PFL Europe 4
- Promotion: Professional Fighters League
- Date: December 14, 2024
- Venue: LDLC Arena
- City: Décines-Charpieu, France

Event chronology
PFL 10	PFL Europe 4	PFL Champions Series 1: Nurmagomedov vs. Hughes

PFL Europe 4 was a mixed martial arts event produced by the Professional Fighters League that took place on December 14, 2024, at the LDLC Arena in Décines-Charpieu, France.

== Background ==
The event marked the promotion's first visit to Décines-Charpieu in the Metropolis of Lyon and third in France since PFL Europe 1 (2024) in March 2024.

A welterweight bout between Abdoul Abdouraguimov and Laureano Staropoli headlined the event.

The finals of 2024 PFL Europe Tournament took place at the event. Shanelle Dyer withdrew of the women's flyweight final against Paulina Wiśniewska due to injury and was replaced by Valentina Scatizzi.

== Results ==
Main card (DAZN)
Weight class				Method	Round	Time	Notes
Welterweight	Abdoul Abdouraguimov	def.	Laureano Staropoli	Decision (unanimous) (30–27, 30–27, 29–28)	3	5:00
Catchweight (165 lb)	Patrick Habirora	def.	Catalin Safta	KO (punch)	3	2:16
Heavyweight	Mickael Groguhe	def.	Mamadou Lamine Sene	Decision (unanimous) (29–28, 29–28, 30–27)	3	5:00
Bantamweight	Lewis McGrillen-Evans	def.	Alexander Luster	TKO (punches and elbows)	2	3:52	(Note: 2024 PFL European Bantamweight Championship Tournament Final.)
Lightweight	Jakub Kaszuba	def.	Connor Hughes	TKO (elbows)	4	4:40	(Note: 2024 PFL European Lightweight Championship Tournament Final.)
Preliminary card (DAZN)
Featherweight	Mathys Duragrin	def.	Yassin Chtatou	Decision (unanimous) (30–26, 30–26, 30–25)	3	5:00
Bantamweight	Mahio Campanella	def.	Ezzoubair Bouarsa	Technical Submission (arm-triangle choke)	1	4:45
Catchweight (177 lb)	Salvo Giudice	def.	Atilla Kobas	Decision (unanimous) (30–27, 30–26, 30–25)	3	5:00
Welterweight	Florim Zendeli	def.	Daniele Miceli	Submission (rear-naked choke)	1	4:24	(Note: 2024 PFL European Welterweight Championship Tournament Final.)
Women's Flyweight	Paulina Wiśniewska	def.	Valentina Scatizzi	TKO (knee and punches)	1	0:20	(Note: 2024 PFL European Women's Flyweight Championship Tournament Final.)
Welterweight	Eoin Sheridan	def.	Brice Belghazi	Decision (unanimous) (30–27, 30–27, 30–27)	3	5:00
Lightweight	Claudio Pacella	def.	Oscar Ownsworth	Decision (unanimous) (30–27, 30–27, 29–28)	3	5:00

== Bracket ==
=== Welterweight ===
Quarter-finals
(Poland) Tomasz Łangowski	1
(Albania) Florim Zendeli	SUB
(England) Jack Grant	KO
(England) Charlie Leary	1
(France) Yassin Najid	1
(Italy) Daniele Miceli	SUB
(The Gambia) Ibrahima Mané	SD
(Angola) Chequina Noso Pedro	3

Semi-finals
(Albania) Florim Zendeli	SD
(England) Jack Grant	3
(Italy) Daniele Miceli	TKO
(The Gambia) Ibrahima Mané	1

Final
(Albania) Florim Zendeli	SUB
(Italy) Daniele Miceli	1

=== Lightweight ===
Quarter-finals
(Poland) Jakub Kaszuba	UD
(England) Kane Mousah	3
(Latvia) Aleksandr Chizov	1
(Italy) Daniele Scatizzi	SUB
(France) Yazid Chouchane	2
(Spain) Ignacio Capella	KO
(Germany) Anatolij Baal	1
(England) Connor Hughes	KO

Semi-finals
(Poland) Jakub Kaszuba	UD
(Italy) Daniele Scatizzi	3
(Spain) Ignacio Capella	3
(England) Connor Hughes	UD

Final
(Poland) Jakub Kaszuba	TKO
(England) Connor Hughes	4

=== Bantamweight ===
Quarter-finals
(England) Dean Garnett (Note: De Paepe failed medicals and Garnett therefore got a bye to the semi-finals)	BYE
(Belgium) Ayton De Paepe	—
(Germany) Khurshed Kakhorov	KO
(Finland) Tuomas Grönvall	3
(England) Dominique Wooding	1
(France) Julien Pierre Lopez	SUB
(Germany) Alexander Luster	SUB
(Turkey) Alperen Karabulut	1

Semi-finals
(England) Dean Garnett	3
(England) Lewis McGrillen-Evans (Note: Garnett was originally scheduled to face Khurshed Kakhorov, but he forced to withdraw due to an undisclosed injury and was replaced by Lewis McGrillen-Evans.)	KO
(France) Julien Pierre Lopez	1
(Germany) Alexander Luster	SUB

Final
(England) Lewis McGrillen-Evans	TKO
(Germany) Alexander Luster	2

=== Women's Flyweight ===
Quarter-finals
(England) Shanelle Dyer	KO
(Georgia (country)) Mariam Torchinava	1
(Italy) Valentina Scatizzi	UD
(France) Marie Louiseau	3
(Netherlands) Lizzy Gevers	3
(Poland) Karolina Wójcik	UD
(Republic of Ireland) Dee Begley	2
(Poland) Paulina Wiśniewska	TKO

Semi-finals
(England) Shanelle Dyer	SD
(Italy) Valentina Scatizzi	3
(Poland) Karolina Wójcik	3
(Poland) Paulina Wiśniewska	UD

Final
(Italy) Valentina Scatizzi (Note: Wiśniewska was originally scheduled to face Shanelle Dyer, but she withdrew due to injury and was replaced by Valentina Scatizzi.)	1
(Poland) Paulina Wiśniewska	TKO

== See also ==
- List of PFL events
- List of current PFL fighters
