= PFL Europe 2 (2024) =

Mixed martial arts event in 2024

- The poster for PFL Europe 2
- Promotion: Professional Fighters League
- Date: June 8, 2024
- Venue: Utilita Arena Newcastle
- City: Newcastle, England

Event chronology
PFL MENA 1	PFL Europe 2	PFL 4

PFL Europe 2 was a mixed martial arts event produced by the Professional Fighters League that took place on June 8, 2024, at the Utilita Arena Newcastle in Newcastle, England.

== Background ==
The event marked the promotion's second visit to Newcastle and first since PFL Europe 1 (2023) in March 2023.

A 160-pounds catchweight bout between current undisputed female super-middleweight boxing world champion Savannah Marshall and Mirela Vargas headlined the event.

This event featured the quarterfinal of 2024 PFL Europe season in a bantamweight and women's flyweight division. This also the latest quarterfinal welterweight division between Jack Grant and Charlie Leary, the winner faced Ibrahim Mané in the semifinal bout.

At weigh-ins, Dee Begley missed the flyweight limit by 4.3 pounds, while Ayton De Paepe proceeded the bantamweight limit by 1.5 pounds. Consequently, Begley was fined 30% of her purse to her opponent, Paulina Wisniewska, and begin the fight with a point deduction. On the other hand, De Paepe failed his medical exams, leading to the cancellation of his fight. As a result, his opponent, Dean Garnett, advanced to the PFL Europe playoffs and receive both his show and win checks.

== Results ==
Main card (DAZN)
Weight class				Method	Round	Time	Notes
Catchweight (160 lb)	Savannah Marshall	def.	Mirela Vargas	TKO (punches)	1	4:27
Lightweight	Dylan Tuke	def.	Kane Mousah	Decision (unanimous) (29–28, 30–27, 29–28)	3	5:00
Welterweight	Jack Grant	def.	Charlie Leary	KO (slam and punches)	1	0:41	(Note: 2024 PFL Europe Welterweight Tournament Quarterfinal.)
Bantamweight	Lewis McGrillen-Evans	def.	Matiss Zaharovs	Decision (unanimous) (29–28, 29–28, 29–28)	3	5:00
Women's Flyweight	Shanelle Dyer	def.	Mariam Torchinava	KO (head kick)	1	3:53	(Note: 2024 PFL Europe Women's Flyweight Tournament Quarterfinal.)
Preliminary card (DAZN)
Featherweight	Ibragim Ibragimov	def.	Josh Reed	Submission (arm-triangle choke)	1	0:50
Bantamweight	Julien Pierre Lopez	def.	Dominique Wooding	Technical Submission (guillotine choke)	1	3:10	(Note: 2024 PFL Europe Bantamweight Tournament Quarterfinal.)
Women's Flyweight	Karolina Wójcik	def.	Lizzy Gevers	Decision (unanimous) (29–28, 29–28, 29–28)	3	5:00	(Note: 2024 PFL Europe Women's Flyweight Tournament Quarterfinal.)
Lightweight	Claudio Pacella	def.	Mark Ewen	Decision (unanimous) (30–27, 29–28, 30–27)	3	5:00
Bantamweight	Khurshed Kakhorov	def.	Tuomas Grönvall	KO (punch)	3	1:11	(Note: 2024 PFL Europe Bantamweight Tournament Quarterfinal.)
Women's Flyweight	Valentina Scatizzi	def.	Marie Loiseau	Decision (unanimous) (30–27, 30–27, 30–27)	3	5:00	(Note: 2024 PFL Europe Women's Flyweight Tournament Quarterfinal.)
Featherweight	Ben Woolliss	def.	Nikola Ivanovic	TKO (knees and punches)	1	4:02
Bantamweight	Alexander Luster	def.	Alperen Karabulut	Submission (rear-naked choke)	1	1:59	(Note: 2024 PFL Europe Bantamweight Tournament Quarterfinal.)
Women's Flyweight	Paulina Wiśniewska	def.	Dee Begley	TKO (punches)	2	3:08	(Note: 2024 PFL Europe Women's Flyweight Tournament Quarterfinal; Begley missed weight (130.3 lbs) and had a point deducted.)

== Brackets ==
=== Welterweight ===
Quarter-finals
(Poland) Tomasz Łangowski	1
(Albania) Florim Zendeli	SUB
(France) Yassin Najid	1
(Italy) Daniele Miceli	SUB
(England) Jack Grant	KO
(England) Charlie Leary	1
(The Gambia) Ibrahim Mané	SD
(Angola) Chequina Noso Pedro	3r.

Semi-finals
(Albania) Florim Zendeli
(Italy) Daniele Miceli
(England) Jack Grant
(The Gambia) Ibrahim Mané

Final

=== Bantamweight ===
Quarter-finals
(England) Dean Garnett (Note: De Paepe failed medicals and Garnett therefore got a bye to the semi-finals)	BYE
(Belgium) Ayton De Paepe	—
(England) Dominique Wooding	1
(France) Julien Pierre Lopez	SUB
(Germany) Khurshed Kakhorov	KO
(Finland) Tuomas Grönvall	3
(Germany) Alexander Luster	SUB
(Turkey) Alperen Karabulut	1

Semi-finals
(England) Dean Garnett
(Germany) Alexander Luster
(Germany) Khurshed Kakhorov
(France) Julien Pierre Lopez

Final

=== Women's Flyweight ===
Quarter-finals
(England) Shanelle Dyer	KO
(Georgia (country)) Mariam Torchinava	1
(Netherlands) Lizzy Gevers	3
(Poland) Karolina Wójcik	UD
(Italy) Valentina Scatizzi	UD
(France) Marie Louiseau	3
(Republic of Ireland) Dee Begley	2
(Poland) Paulina Wiśniewska	TKO

Semi-finals
(England) Shanelle Dyer
(Poland) Karolina Wójcik
(Italy) Valentina Scatizzi
(Poland) Paulina Wiśniewska

Final

== See also ==
- List of PFL events
- List of current PFL fighters
