= PFL MENA 3 (2024) =

Mixed martial arts event

- The poster for PFL MENA 3
- Promotion: Professional Fighters League
- Date: September 20, 2024
- Venue: PFL MENA Studio, Boulevard City
- City: Riyadh, Saudi Arabia

Event chronology
PFL 9	PFL MENA 3	PFL Europe 3

PFL MENA 3 was a mixed martial arts event produced by the Professional Fighters League that took place on September 20, 2024, at the PFL MENA Studio, Boulevard City in Riyadh, Saudi Arabia.

== Background ==
The event marked the promotion's first host at the Boulevard City in Riyadh.

The event featured the semifinals of 2024 PFL MENA seasons in a welterweight, lightweight, featherweight and bantamweight divisions. Abdullah Saleem has failed an in-competition drug test against Omar Reguigui and Reguigui advanced to semifinal against Georges Eid.

== Results ==
Main card (DAZN)
Weight class				Method	Round	Time	Notes
Featherweight	Abdalrahman Alhyasat	def.	Abdullah Al-Qahtani	Decision (unanimous) (30–27, 29–28, 29–28)	3	5:00	(Note: 2024 PFL MENA Featherweight Tournament Semifinal.)
Welterweight	Omar El Dafrawy	def.	Jarrah Al-Silawi	KO (punches)	1	3:11	(Note: 2024 PFL MENA Welterweight Tournament Semifinal.)
Welterweight	Mohammad Alaqraa	def.	Amir Fazli	Decision (unanimous) (30–27, 30–27, 30–26)	3	5:00	(Note: 2024 PFL MENA Welterweight Tournament Semifinal.)
Lightweight	Mohsen Mohammadseifi	def.	Souhil Taïri	Decision (unanimous) (29–28, 30–27, 29–28)	3	5:00	(Note: 2024 PFL MENA Lightweight Tournament Semifinal.)
Bantamweight	Ali Taleb	def.	Jalal Al Daaja	KO (punches)	1	2:25	(Note: 2024 PFL MENA Bantamweight Tournament Semifinal.)
Featherweight	Islam Reda	def.	Maraoune Bellagouit	Decision (unanimous) (29–27, 30–26, 30–27)	3	5:00	(Note: 2024 PFL MENA Featherweight Tournament Semifinal.)
Bantamweight	Rachid Haz	def.	Elias Boudegzdame	Decision (unanimous) (29–28, 29–28, 29–28)	3	5:00	(Note: 2024 PFL MENA Bantamweight Tournament Semifinal.)
Lightweight	Georges Eid	def.	Omar Reguigui	TKO (punches)	1	1:39	(Note: 2024 PFL MENA Lightweight Tournament Semifinal.)
Flyweight	Malik Basahel	def.	Saher Qasmieh	Decision (unanimous) (30–26, 30–27, 30–26)	3	3:00	(Note: Amateur bout.)
Featherweight	Adam Meskini	def.	Yazeed Hasanain	Decision (split) (29–28, 28–29, 29–28)	3	5:00

== Bracket ==
=== Welterweight ===
Quarter-finals
(Egypt) Omar El-Dafrawy	UD
(Lebanon) Anthony Zeidan	3
(Jordan) Jarrah Al-Silawi	SUB
(Algeria) Rayan Atmani	1
(Iran) Amir Fazli	3
(Morocco) Badreddine Diani	UD
(Kuwait) Mohammad Alaqraa	TKO
(France) Youcef Ouabbas	3

Semi-finals
(Egypt) Omar El-Dafrawy	KO
(Jordan) Jarrah Al-Silawi	1
(Iran) Amir Fazli (Note: Alaqraa was originally scheduled to face Badreddine Diani, but he forced to withdraw due to an undisclosed injury and was replaced by Amir Fazli.)	3
(Kuwait) Mohammad Alaqraa	UD

Final
(Egypt) Omar El-Dafrawy
(Kuwait) Mohammad Alaqraa

=== Lightweight ===
Quarter-finals
(Egypt) Ahmed Amir	3
(France) Souhil Tahiri	UD
(Lebanon) Josh Togo	1
(Iran) Mohsen Mohammadseifi	TKO
(Lebanon) Georges Eid	UD
(Pakistan) Abbas Khan	3
(Kuwait) Abdullah Saleem	SUB (Note: Originally a submission (triangle choke) win for Saleem; overturned after he failed an in-competition drug test, Reguigui advanced to semifinal.)
(Tunisia) Omar Reguigui	1

Semi-finals
(France) Souhil Tahiri	3
(Iran) Mohsen Mohammadseifi	UD
(Lebanon) Georges Eid	TKO
(Tunisia) Omar Reguigui	1

Final
(Iran) Mohsen Mohammadseifi
(Lebanon) Georges Eid

=== Featherweight ===
Quarter-finals
(Jordan) Yazeed Hasanain	2
(Saudi Arabia) Abdullah Al-Qahtani	TKO
(Jordan) Abdalrahman Alhyasat	UD
(Egypt) Ahmed Tarek	3
(Egypt) Mido Mohamed	3
(Morocco) Maraoune Bellagouit	TKO
(Egypt) Islam Reda	UD
(Morocco) Adam Meskini	3

Semi-finals
(Saudi Arabia) Abdullah Al-Qahtani	3
(Jordan) Abdalrahman Alhyasat	UD
(Morocco) Maraoune Bellagouit	3
(Egypt) Islam Reda	UD

Final
(Jordan) Abdalrahman Alhyasat
(Egypt) Islam Reda

=== Bantamweight ===
Quarter-finals
(Jordan) Jalal Al Daaja (Note: Officially a unanimous decision win for Ismail, Al Daaja advanced to the semifinal due to Ismail missed weight.)	DRAW
(Kuwait) Tariq Ismail	3
(Jordan) Nawras Abzakh	3
(Iraq) Ali Taleb	UD
(Morocco) Xavier Alaoui	2
(Morocco) Rachid Haz	SUB
(Algeria) Elias Boudegzdame	SUB
(Egypt) Hassan Mandour	2r.

Semi-finals
(Jordan) Jalal Al Daaja	1
(Iraq) Ali Taleb	KO
(Morocco) Rachid Haz	UD
(Algeria) Elias Boudegzdame	3

Final
(Iraq) Ali Taleb
(Morocco) Rachid Haz

== See also ==
- List of PFL events
- List of current PFL fighters

== Official Website ==
PFL MENA
