= PFL MENA 1 (2024) =

Mixed martial arts event

- The poster for PFL MENA 1
- Promotion: Professional Fighters League
- Date: May 10, 2024
- Venue: The Green Halls
- City: Riyadh, Saudi Arabia

Event chronology
PFL 3	PFL MENA 1	PFL Europe 2

PFL MENA 1 was a mixed martial arts event produced by the Professional Fighters League that took place on May 10, 2024, at The Green Halls in Riyadh, Saudi Arabia.

== Background ==
In late August, 2023, the promotion announced that it had sold a minority stake for $100 million to SRJ Sports Investments – a branch of Public Investment Fund – to invest into creating PFL MENA (Middle East and North Africa) regional league. Starting in 2024, PFL MENA will feature the top emerging Middle East and North African fighters, and will be broadcast during prime local hours with all events staged in the MENA region and live stream on DAZN. The format will follow the same as the regular PFL Season, with the winner receiving a $100,000 prize and a chance to earn a spot in the 2025 PFL regular season.

== Results ==
Main card (DAZN)
Weight class				Method	Round	Time	Notes
Featherweight	Abdullah Al-Qahtani	def.	Yazeed Hasanain	TKO (submission to punches)	2	4:59	(Note: 2024 PFL MENA Featherweight Tournament Quarterfinal. Hasanain missed weight (146.6 lbs) and had a point deducted.)
Bantamweight	Ali Taleb	def.	Nawras Abzakh	Decision (unanimous) (30–27, 30–27, 29–28)	3	5:00	(Note: 2024 PFL MENA Bantamweight Tournament Quarterfinal.)
Bantamweight	Rachid Haz	def.	Xavier Alaoui	Submission (rear-naked choke)	2	2:54	(Note: 2024 PFL MENA Bantamweight Tournament Quarterfinal.)
Featherweight	Islam Reda	def.	Adam Meskini	Decision (unanimous) (30–27, 29–28, 29–28)	3	5:00	(Note: 2024 PFL MENA Featherweight Tournament Quarterfinal.)
Bantamweight	Tariq Ismail	def.	Jalal Al Daaja	Decision (unanimous) (30–27, 29–28, 29–28)	3	5:00	(Note: 2024 PFL MENA Bantamweight Tournament Quarterfinal. Ismail missed weight (136.4 lbs) and had a point deducted.)
Bantamweight	Elias Boudegzdame	def.	Hassan Mandour	Submission (guillotine choke)	2	0:52	(Note: 2024 PFL MENA Bantamweight Tournament Quarterfinal.)
Women's Atomweight	Hattan Alsaif	def.	Nada Faheem	KO (head kick)	2	0:41	(Note: Amateur bout.)
Featherweight	Maraoune Bellagouit	def.	Mido Mohamed	TKO (punch)	3	4:24	(Note: 2024 PFL MENA Featherweight Tournament Quarterfinal.)
Featherweight	Abdalrahman Alhyasat	def.	Ahmed Tarek	Decision (unanimous) (29–28, 30–27, 29–27)	3	5:00	(Note: 2024 PFL MENA Featherweight Tournament Quarterfinal.)
Flyweight	Malik Basahel	def.	Harsh Pandya	Decision (unanimous) (29–28, 30–27, 29–28)	3	3:00	(Note: Amateur bout.)

== Brackets ==
=== Featherweight ===
Quarter-finals
(Jordan) Yazeed Hasanain	2r.
(Saudi Arabia) Abdullah Al-Qahtani	TKO
(Jordan) Abdalrahman Alhyasat	UD
(Egypt) Ahmed Tarek	3r.
(Egypt) Mido Mohamed	3r.
(Morocco) Maraoune Bellagouit	TKO
(Egypt) Islam Reda	UD
(Morocco) Adam Meskini	3r.

Semi-finals
(Saudi Arabia) Abdullah Al-Qahtani
(Jordan) Abdalrahman Alhyasat
(Morocco) Maraoune Bellagouit
(Egypt) Islam Reda

Final

=== Bantamweight ===
Quarter-finals
(Jordan) Jalal Al Daaja (Note: Officially a unanimous decision victory for Ismail, Al Daaja advanced due to the weight miss by Ismail)	DRAW
(Kuwait) Tariq Ismail	3r.
(Jordan) Nawras Abzakh	3r.
(Iraq) Ali Taleb	UD
(Morocco) Xavier Alaoui	2r.
(Morocco) Rachid Haz	SUB
(Algeria) Elias Boudegzdame	SUB
(Egypt) Hassan Mandour	2r.

Semi-finals
(Jordan) Jalal Al Daaja
(Iraq) Ali Taleb
(Morocco) Rachid Haz
(Algeria) Elias Boudegzdame

Final

== See also ==
- List of PFL events
- List of current PFL fighters
