= PFL Europe 3 (2024) =

Professional Fighters League MMA event in 2024

- The poster for PFL Europe 3
- Promotion: Professional Fighters League
- Date: September 28, 2024
- Venue: OVO Hydro
- City: Glasgow, Scotland

Event chronology
PFL MENA 3	PFL Europe 3	PFL Super Fights: Battle of the Giants

PFL Europe 3 was a mixed martial arts event produced by the Professional Fighters League that took place on September 28, 2024, at the OVO Hydro in Glasgow, Scotland.

== Background ==
This event marked the organization's debut in Scotland.

A welterweight bout between former Cage Warriors Lightweight Champion Stevie Ray and Lewis Long headlined the event.

2023 PFL Europe bantamweight winner Khurshed Kakhorov was scheduled to face Dean Garnett in a bantamweight semifinal, but was forced to withdraw, due to an undisclosed injury, and was replaced by Federico Fasciano.

== Results ==
Main card (DAZN)
Weight class				Method	Round	Time	Notes
Welterweight	Stevie Ray	def.	Lewis Long	Submission (twister)	1	4:24
Catchweight (150 lb)	Rob Whiteford	def.	Roger Huerta	Decision (unanimous) (30–27, 29–28, 29–28)	3	5:00
Lightweight	Mark Ewen	def.	Yassin Chtatou	Submission (brabo choke)	1	2:30
Bantamweight	Lewis McGrillen-Evans	def.	Dean Garnett	KO (punch)	3	1:43	(Note: 2024 PFL Europe Bantamweight Tournament Semifinal.)
Bantamweight	Alexander Luster	def.	Julien Pierre Lopez	Submission (rear-naked choke)	1	1:15	(Note: 2024 PFL Europe Bantamweight Tournament Semifinal.)
Welterweight	Florim Zendeli	def.	Jack Grant	Decision (split) (28–29, 29–28, 29–28)	3	5:00	(Note: 2024 PFL Europe Welterweight Tournament Semifinal.)
Welterweight	Daniele Miceli	def.	Ibrahima Mané	TKO (punches)	1	1:26	(Note: 2024 PFL Europe Welterweight Tournament Semifinal.)
Preliminary card (DAZN)
Lightweight	Jakub Kaszuba	def.	Daniele Scatizzi	Decision (unanimous) (30–27, 29–28, 29–28)	3	5:00	(Note: 2024 PFL Europe Lightweight Tournament Semifinal.)
Lightweight	Connor Hughes	def.	Ignacio Capella	Decision (unanimous) (29–28, 29–28, 29–28)	3	5:00	(Note: 2024 PFL Europe Lightweight Tournament Semifinal.)
Women's Flyweight	Shanelle Dyer	def.	Valentina Scatizzi	Decision (split) (28–29, 29–28, 29–28)	3	5:00	(Note: 2024 PFL Europe Women's Flyweight Tournament Semifinal.)
Women's Flyweight	Paulina Wiśniewska	def.	Karolina Wójcik	Decision (unanimous) (30–27, 30–27, 30–27)	3	5:00	(Note: 2024 PFL Europe Women's Flyweight Tournament Semifinal.)
Lightweight	Lorenzo Parente	def.	Stefano Catacoli	Submission (armbar)	1	1:45
Bantamweight	Matiss Zaharovs	def.	Brian Hyslop	Submission (rear-naked choke)	2	4:18
Women's Flyweight	Gemma Auld	def.	Weronika Pietruszka	TKO (punches)	1	4:50

== Bracket ==
=== Welterweight ===
Quarter-finals
(Poland) Tomasz Łangowski	1
(Albania) Florim Zendeli	SUB
(England) Jack Grant	KO
(England) Charlie Leary	1
(France) Yassin Najid	1
(Italy) Daniele Miceli	SUB
(The Gambia) Ibrahima Mané	SD
(Angola) Chequina Noso Pedro	3

Semi-finals
(Albania) Florim Zendeli	SD
(England) Jack Grant	3
(Italy) Daniele Miceli	TKO
(The Gambia) Ibrahima Mané	1

Final
(Albania) Florim Zendeli
(Italy) Daniele Miceli

=== Lightweight ===
Quarter-finals
(Poland) Jakub Kaszuba	UD
(England) Kane Mousah	3
(Latvia) Aleksandr Chizov	1
(Italy) Daniele Scatizzi	SUB
(France) Yazid Chouchane	2
(Spain) Ignacio Capella	KO
(Germany) Anatolij Baal	1
(England) Connor Hughes	KO

Semi-finals
(Poland) Jakub Kaszuba	UD
(Italy) Daniele Scatizzi	3
(Spain) Ignacio Capella	3
(England) Connor Hughes	UD

Final
(Poland) Jakub Kaszuba
(England) Connor Hughes

=== Bantamweight ===
Quarter-finals
(England) Dean Garnett (Note: De Paepe failed medicals and Garnett therefore got a bye to the semi-finals)	BYE
(Belgium) Ayton De Paepe	—
(Germany) Khurshed Kakhorov	KO
(Finland) Tuomas Grönvall	3
(England) Dominique Wooding	1
(France) Julien Pierre Lopez	SUB
(Germany) Alexander Luster	SUB
(Turkey) Alperen Karabulut	1

Semi-finals
(England) Dean Garnett	3
(England) Lewis McGrillen-Evans (Note: Garnett was originally scheduled to face Khurshed Kakhorov, but he forced to withdraw due to an undisclosed injury and was replaced by Lewis McGrillen-Evans.)	KO
(France) Julien Pierre Lopez	1
(Germany) Alexander Luster	SUB

Final
(England) Lewis McGrillen-Evans
(Germany) Alexander Luster

=== Women's Flyweight ===
Quarter-finals
(England) Shanelle Dyer	KO
(Georgia (country)) Mariam Torchinava	1
(Italy) Valentina Scatizzi	UD
(France) Marie Louiseau	3
(Netherlands) Lizzy Gevers	3
(Poland) Karolina Wójcik	UD
(Republic of Ireland) Dee Begley	2
(Poland) Paulina Wiśniewska	TKO

Semi-finals
(England) Shanelle Dyer	SD
(Italy) Valentina Scatizzi	3
(Poland) Karolina Wójcik	3
(Poland) Paulina Wiśniewska	UD

Final
(England) Shanelle Dyer
(Poland) Paulina Wiśniewska

== See also ==
- List of PFL events
- List of current PFL fighters
