= 2023 in Professional Fighters League =

Information
- First date: March 25, 2023
- Last date: December 8, 2023

Events
- Total events: 14

Fights
- Title fights: 10

This is a list of events and standings for the Professional Fighters League, a mixed martial arts organization based in the United States, for the 2023 season.

== Events ==
The PFL 2023 season started off with three shows planned in Las Vegas, Nevada, making a return to the city for the first time in three years. The first show aired on April 1, 2023, with the two subsequent shows airing on the Fridays afterward, on April 7 and 14.

The second half of the regular season was held in Atlanta, Georgia, on June 8, June 16 and June 23.

The first playoff event, PFL 7, was held in San Antonio, Texas on August 4, and two following playoff events in New York City, New York on August 18 and 23, respectively. The season finals were held in Washington, D.C., on November 24.

#	Event	Date	Venue	Location
14	PFL Europe 4	December 8, 2023	3Arena	Dublin, Ireland
13	PFL 10	November 24, 2023	The Anthem	Washington, D.C., U.S.
12	PFL Europe 3	September 30, 2023	Zénith Paris - La Villette	Paris, France
11	PFL 9	August 23, 2023	The Theater at Madison Square Garden	New York City, New York, U.S.
10	PFL 8	August 18, 2023	The Theater at Madison Square Garden	New York City, New York, U.S.
9	PFL 7	August 4, 2023	Boeing Center at Tech Port	San Antonio, Texas, U.S.
8	PFL Europe 2	July 8, 2023	Verti Music Hall	Berlin, Germany
7	PFL 6	June 23, 2023	Overtime Elite Arena	Atlanta, Georgia, United States
6	PFL 5	June 16, 2023	Overtime Elite Arena	Atlanta, Georgia, United States
5	PFL 4	June 8, 2023	Overtime Elite Arena	Atlanta, Georgia, United States
4	PFL 3	April 14, 2023	The Theater at Virgin Hotels	Las Vegas, Nevada, United States
3	PFL 2	April 7, 2023	The Theater at Virgin Hotels	Las Vegas, Nevada, United States
2	PFL 1	April 1, 2023	The Theater at Virgin Hotels	Las Vegas, Nevada, United States
1	PFL Europe 1	March 25, 2023	Vertu Motors Arena	Newcastle, England

== 2023 World champions ==
=== 2023 PFL World champions ===
Division	Upper weight limit	Champion	Date
Heavyweight	265 lb (120 kg; 18.9 st)	Renan Ferreira	November 24, 2023 (PFL 10)
Light Heavyweight	205 lb (93 kg; 14.6 st)	Impa Kasanganay	November 24, 2023 (PFL 10)
Welterweight	170 lb (77 kg; 12 st)	Magomed Magomedkerimov (2)	November 24, 2023 (PFL 10)
Lightweight	155 lb (70 kg; 11.1 st)	Olivier Aubin-Mercier (2)	November 24, 2023 (PFL 10)
Featherweight	145 lb (66 kg; 10.5 st)	Jesus Pinedo	November 24, 2023 (PFL 10)
Women's Featherweight	145 lb (66 kg; 10.5 st)	Larissa Pacheco	November 24, 2023 (PFL 10)

=== 2023 PFL Europe World champions ===
Division	Upper weight limit	Champion	Date
Light Heavyweight	205 lb (93 kg; 14.6 st)	Jakob Nedoh	December 8, 2023 (PFL Europe 4)
Lightweight	155 lb (70 kg; 11.1 st)	Jakub Kaszuba	December 8, 2023 (PFL Europe 4)
Bantamweight	135 lb (61 kg; 9.6 st)	Khurshed Kakhorov	December 8, 2023 (PFL Europe 4)
Women's Flyweight	125 lb (57 kg; 8.9 st)	Dakota Ditcheva	December 8, 2023 (PFL Europe 4)

== PFL Challenger Series ==
PFL Challenger Series is an American mixed martial arts promotion. Young and up-and-coming male and female MMA prospects will compete for a slot in the PFL tournament season and a chance at $1 million. Each week, the PFL Challenger Series will consist of a celebrity guest panel featuring personalities in film, athletics, and music. The PFL Challenger Series will debut on fuboTV. The eight events will stream on consecutive Friday nights starting Feb. 18, and run through March. It will also air on its linear network, Fubo Sports Network.

2023 Contract Winners:

- HW: Abraham Bably, Denzel Freeman
- LHW: Impa Kasanganay
- WW: Thad Jean
- LW: Elvin Espinoza
- FW: Brahyan Zurcher
- W FW: Amanda Leve
- W FLY: Desiree Yanez

== PFL Europe ==
Starting in 2023, PFL Europe will feature the top emerging European MMA fighters, and will be broadcast during prime local hours with all events staged in Europe. The format will follow the same as the regular PFL Season, with the winner receiving a $100,000 prize and a chance to earn a spot in the 2024 PFL regular season.

=== Light Heavyweight ===
Quarter-finals
(Netherlands) Mohamed Amine	2r.
(United Kingdom) Simeón Powell	SUB
(Spain) Abdellah Er-Ramy	TKO
(Romania) Mădălin Pîrvulescu	1r.
(Italy) Riccardo Nosiglia	1r.
(Slovenia) Jakob Nedoh	KO
(France) Anthony Salamone	TKO
(Spain) Daniel Ladero	1r.

Semi-finals
(United Kingdom) Simeón Powell	UD
(Spain) Daniel Ladero (Note: Er-Ramy wasn not medically cleared and was replaced by Daniel Ladero)	3r.
(Slovenia) Jakob Nedoh	TKO
(France) Anthony Salamone	1r.

Final
(United Kingdom) Simeón Powell	2r.
(Slovenia) Jakob Nedoh	TKO

=== Lightweight ===
Quarter-finals
(Latvia) Aleksandr Chizov (Note: Officially a Unanimous decision victory for Duque, Chizov advanced due to the weight miss by Duque)	DRAW
(Spain) Acoidan Duque	3r.
(Republic of Ireland) John Mitchell	UD
(France) Geysim Derouiche	3r.
(United Kingdom) Connor Hughes	3r.
(Republic of Ireland) Dylan Tuke	UD
(Italy) Maxim Radu	1r.
(Poland) Jakub Kaszuba	SUB

Semi-finals
(France) Geysim Derouiche (Note: Chizov missed weight and was replaced by Geysim Derouiche)	3r.
(Republic of Ireland) John Mitchell	UD
(Republic of Ireland) Dylan Tuke	3r.
(Poland) Jakub Kaszuba	UD

Final
(Republic of Ireland) John Mitchell	2r.
(Poland) Jakub Kaszuba	TKO

=== Bantamweight ===
Quarter-finals
(Italy) Francesco Nuzzi	KO
Farbod Iran Nezhad	1r.
(South Africa) Frans Mlambo	MD
(Spain) Rachid Haz	3r.
(France) Moktar Benkaci	3r.
(Tajikistan) Khurshed Kakhorov	UD
(Sweden) Ali Taleb	TKO
(Switzerland) Kenji Bortoluzzi	1r.

Semi-finals
(France) Moktar Benkaci (Note: Francesco Nuzzi pulled out of the bout and was replaced by Moktar Benkaci)	3r.
(South Africa) Frans Mlambo	SD
(Tajikistan) Khurshed Kakhorov	UD
(Sweden) Ali Taleb	3r.

Final
(South Africa) Frans Mlambo	2r.
(Tajikistan) Khurshed Kakhorov	TKO

=== Women's Flyweight ===
Quarter-finals
(United Kingdom) Dakota Ditcheva	SUB
(Sweden) Malin Hermansson	1r.
(Poland) Marta Waliczek	3r.
(Sweden) Cornelia Holm	SD
(Germany) Lorena Cubero	3r.
(Belgium) Griet Eeckhout	UD
(Italy) Valentina Scatizzi	SD
(Netherlands) Lizzy Gevers	3r.

Semi-finals
(United Kingdom) Dakota Ditcheva	KO
(Sweden) Cornelia Holm	3r.
(Italy) Manuela Marconetto (Note: Griet Eeckhout pulled out of the bout and was replaced by Manuela Marconetto)	—
(Italy) Valentina Scatizzi	BYE (Note: Marconetto missed weight and Scatizzi therefore got a bye to the finals)

Final
(United Kingdom) Dakota Ditcheva	TKO
(Italy) Valentina Scatizzi	1r.

== Playoffs ==
=== 2023 PFL Heavyweight playoffs ===
Semifinals
1	(Russia) Denis Goltsov	SUB
4	(United States) Jordan Heiderman	1
2	(Brazil) Renan Ferreira	KO
5	(United States) Maurice Greene*	1

Finals
1	(Russia) Denis Goltsov	2
2	(Brazil) Renan Ferreira	TKO

- Marcelo Nunes was originally scheduled to face Renan Ferreira but was unable to continue in the tournament. He was replaced by #5 ranked Maurice Greene.

=== 2023 PFL Light Heavyweight playoffs ===
Semifinals
1	(United States) Josh Silveira	TKO
4	(United States) Ty Flores	1
2	(Norway) Marthin Hamlet	1
3	(United States) Impa Kasanganay	KO

Finals
1	(United States) Josh Silveira	5
3	(United States) Impa Kasanganay	UD

=== 2023 PFL Welterweight playoffs ===
Semifinals
1	(Russia) Magomed Magomedkerimov	UD
5	(United States) Solomon Renfro*	3
2	(Brazil) Carlos Leal	3
3	(Sweden) Sadibou Sy	SD

Finals
1	(Russia) Magomed Magomedkerimov	SUB
3	(Sweden) Sadibou Sy	3

- Magomed Umalatov was originally scheduled to face Magomed Magomedkerimov but was unable to continue in the tournament. He was replaced by #5 ranked Solomon Renfro.

=== 2023 PFL Lightweight playoffs ===
Semifinals
1	(United States) Clay Collard	UD
4	(United States) Shane Burgos	3
2	(Canada) Olivier Aubin-Mercier	TKO
3	(Brazil) Bruno Miranda	2

Finals
1	(United States) Clay Collard	5
2	(Canada) Olivier Aubin-Mercier	UD

=== 2023 PFL Featherweight playoffs ===
Semifinals
1	(United States) Bubba Jenkins	2
4	(Peru) Jesus Pinedo	TKO
2	(Brazil) Gabriel Alves Braga	SD
5	(United States) Chris Wade*	3

Finals
4	(Peru) Jesus Pinedo	KO
2	(Brazil) Gabriel Alves Braga	3

- Movlid Khaybulaev was originally scheduled to face Gabriel Braga but was unable to continue in the tournament. He was replaced by #5 ranked Chris Wade.

=== 2023 PFL Women's Featherweight playoffs ===
Semifinals
1	(Brazil) Larissa Pacheco	TKO
4	(Ukraine) Olena Kolesnyk	1
2	(Russia) Marina Mokhnatkina	SUB
3	(United States) Amber Leibrock	1

Finals
1	(Brazil) Larissa Pacheco	UD
2	(Russia) Marina Mokhnatkina	5

Legend
(SD)	(Split Decision)
(UD)	(Unanimous Decision)
(MD)	(Majority Decision)
SUB	Submission
(T)KO	(Technical) Knock Out
L	Loss

== Standings ==
The PFL points system is based on results of the match. The winner of a fight receives 3 points. If the fight ends in a draw, both fighters will receive 1 point. A no-contest will be scored as a draw. The bonus for winning a fight in the first, second, or third round is 3 points, 2 points, and 1 point respectively. The bonus for winning in the third round requires a fight be stopped before 4:59 of the third round. No bonus point will be awarded if a fighter wins via decision. For example, if a fighter wins a fight in the first round, then the fighter will receive 6 total points. A decision win will result in three total points. If a fighter misses weight, the opponent (should they comply with weight limits) will receive 3 points due to a walkover victory, regardless of winning or losing the bout, with the fighter who missed weight being deducted 1 standings point; if the non-offending fighter subsequently wins with a stoppage, all bonus points will be awarded. A fighter who was unable to compete for any reason, will receive a 1-point penalty (-1 point in the standings). The fighters who made weight will not receive a walkover, but will earn points and contracted purse amounts based on their performance in the altered matchup.

Nine PFL fighters were suspended by the Nevada State Athletic Commission after failing drug tests; which included former UFC title challenger Thiago Santos and former PFL heavyweight champion Bruno Cappelozza. Additional fighters impacted by the suspensions are Krzysztof Jotko, Rizvan Kuniev, Mohammed Fakhreddine, Cezar Ferreira, and Will Fleury. Two featherweight season fighters, Alejandro Flores and Daniel Torres, were also suspended. In light of fighter suspensions, they were all removed from the season after the first round of bouts.

=== Heavyweight ===
Fighter	Wins	Draws	Losses	1st	2nd	3rd	Total Points (Note: The four fighters with most points advance to the playoffs)
(Russia) Denis Goltsov	2	0	0	2	0	0	12
(Brazil) Renan Ferreira	2	0	0	1	0	0	9 (Note: Received 3 points after PFL 2 result overturned)
(Brazil) Marcelo Nunes	1	0	1	1	0	0	6
(United States) Jordan Heiderman	1	0	0	1	0	0	6
(United States) Maurice Greene	1	0	1	0	1	0	5
(Brazil) Matheus Scheffel	1	0	1	0	0	0	3 (Note: Received 3 points after PFL 2 result overturned)
(Brazil) Danilo Marques	1	0	1	0	0	0	3
(Croatia) Ante Delija	1	0	0	0	0	0	3
(Cape Verde) Yorgan De Castro	0	0	2	0	0	0	0
(United States) Patrick Brady	0	0	1	0	0	0	0

=== Light Heavyweight ===
Fighter	Wins	Draws	Losses	1st	2nd	3rd	Total Points (Note: The four fighters with most points advance to the playoffs)
(United States) Josh Silveira	2	0	0	2	0	0	12
(Norway) Marthin Hamlet	2	0	0	1	0	0	9
(United States) Impa Kasanganay	1	0	0	0	1	0	5
(United States) Ty Flores	2	0	0	0	0	0	5
(United States) Andrew Sanchez	1	0	0	0	0	0	3
(Tonga) Sam Kei	0	0	2	0	0	0	0
(Brazil) Delan Monte	0	0	2	0	0	0	0
(United States) Taylor Johnson	0	0	1	0	0	0	0
(United States) Daniel Spohn	0	0	1	0	0	0	0
(United States) Tim Caron	0	0	1	0	0	0	0

=== Welterweight ===
Fighter	Wins	Draws	Losses	1st	2nd	3rd	Total Points (Note: The four fighters with most points advance to the playoffs)
(Russia) Magomed Magomedkerimov	2	0	0	2	0	0	12
(Brazil) Carlos Leal	2	0	0	1	1	0	11
(Sweden) Sadibou Sy	2	0	0	0	1	1	9
(Russia) Magomed Umalatov	2	0	0	1	0	0	9
(United States) Solomon Renfro	1	0	0	0	1	0	5
(Mexico) Nayib López	1	0	1	0	0	0	3
(Australia) Shane Mitchell	0	0	2	0	0	0	0
(Germany) David Zawada	0	0	2	0	0	0	0
(Jordan) Jarrah Al-Silawi	0	0	2	0	0	0	0
(Jamaica) Dilano Taylor	0	0	2	0	0	0	-1

=== Lightweight ===
Fighter	Wins	Draws	Losses	1st	2nd	3rd	Total Points (Note: The four fighters with most points advance to the playoffs)
(United States) Clay Collard	2	0	0	0	1	0	8
(Canada) Olivier Aubin-Mercier	2	0	0	0	0	1	7
(Brazil) Bruno Miranda	2	0	0	0	0	0	6
(United States) Shane Burgos	1	0	1	0	0	0	3
(Brazil) Natan Schulte	1	0	1	0	0	0	3
(Brazil) Raush Manfio	1	0	1	0	0	0	3
(Japan) Yamato Nishikawa	0	0	2	0	0	0	0
(Paraguay) Alexander Martinez	0	0	2	0	0	0	0
(United Kingdom) Stevie Ray	0	0	2	0	0	0	0
(Canada) Anthony Romero	0	0	1	0	0	0	0

=== Featherweight ===
Fighter	Wins	Draws	Losses	1st	2nd	3rd	Total Points (Note: The four fighters with most points advance to the playoffs)
(United States) Bubba Jenkins	2	0	0	1	0	0	9
(Brazil) Gabriel Alves Braga	2	0	0	1	0	0	9
(Russia) Movlid Khaybulaev	2	0	0	0	1	0	8
(Peru) Jesus Pinedo	1	0	1	1	0	0	6
(United States) Chris Wade	1	0	1	1	0	0	6
(United Kingdom) Brendan Loughnane	1	0	1	0	1	0	5
(Brazil) Marlon Moraes	0	0	2	0	0	0	0
(Japan) Ryoji Kudo	0	0	2	0	0	0	0
(United States) Tyler Diamond	0	0	1	0	0	0	0
(South Korea) Sung Bin Jo	0	0	1	0	0	0	0

=== Women's Featherweight ===
Fighter	Wins	Draws	Losses	1st	2nd	3rd	Total Points (Note: The four fighters with most points advance to the playoffs)
(Brazil) Larissa Pacheco	2	0	0	1	0	0	9
(Russia) Marina Mokhnatkina	2	0	0	0	1	0	8
(United States) Amber Leibrock	1	0	1	1	0	0	6
(Ukraine) Olena Kolesnyk	2	0	0	0	0	0	5
(United States) Aspen Ladd	1	0	1	0	1	0	5
(Canada) Julia Budd	1	0	1	0	0	0	3
(Brazil) Evelyn Martins	1	0	1	0	0	0	3
(Poland) Karolina Sobek	0	0	2	0	0	0	0
(Japan) Yoko Higashi	0	0	2	0	0	0	0
(Czech Republic) Martina Jindrová	0	0	2	0	0	0	0

== See also ==
- List of PFL events
- List of current PFL fighters
- 2023 in UFC
- 2023 in Bellator MMA
- 2023 in ONE Championship
- 2023 in Absolute Championship Akhmat
- 2023 in Konfrontacja Sztuk Walki
- 2023 in Rizin Fighting Federation
- 2023 in LUX Fight League
- 2023 in AMC Fight Nights
- 2023 in Brave Combat Federation
- 2023 in Road FC
- 2023 in Eagle Fighting Championship
- 2023 in Legacy Fighting Alliance
