= PFL Europe 2 =

PFL Europe 2 may refer to the following events from the Professional Fighters League:

- PFL Europe 2 (2023)
- PFL Europe 2 (2024)

== See also ==
- PFL (disambiguation)
