= PFL Europe 1 (2024) =

Mixed martial arts event

- The poster for PFL Europe 1
- Promotion: Professional Fighters League
- Date: March 7, 2024
- Venue: Accor Arena
- City: Paris, France

Event chronology
| PFL vs. Bellator | PFL Europe 1 | PFL 1 |

PFL Europe 1 was a mixed martial arts event produced by the Professional Fighters League that took place on March 7, 2024, at the Accor Arena in Paris, France.

== Background ==
The event marked the promotion's second visit to Paris and first since PFL Europe 3 (2023) in September 2023.

A welterweight bout between former two-time Glory Welterweight Champion Cédric Doumbé and Baissangour Chamsoudinov headlined the event.

== Results ==
Main card (DAZN)
| Weight class | | | | Method | Round | Time | Notes |
|---|---|---|---|---|---|---|---|
| Welterweight | Baissangour Chamsoudinov | def. | Cédric Doumbé | TKO (toe injury) | 3 | 1:21 |
| Welterweight | Abdoul Abdouraguimov | def. | Jack Grant | Decision (split) (30–27, 28–29, 29–28) | 3 | 5:00 |
| Welterweight | Ibrahim Mané | def. | Chequina Noso Pedro | Decision (split) (29–28, 28–29, 29–28) | 3 | 5:00 | (Note: 2024 PFL Europe Welterweight Quarter-Final) |
| Lightweight | Ignacio Capella | def. | Yazid Chouchane | KO (punch) | 2 | 2:31 | (Note: 2024 PFL Europe Lightweight Quarter-Final) |
| Lightweight | Jakub Kaszuba | def. | Kane Mousah | Decision (unanimous) (29–28, 29–28, 29–28) | 3 | 5:00 | (Note: 2024 PFL Europe Lightweight Quarter-Final) |
Preliminary card (DAZN)
| Welterweight | Daniele Miceli | def. | Yassin Najid | Technical Submission (Von Flue choke) | 1 | 0:27 | (Note: 2024 PFL Europe Welterweight Quarter-Final) |
| Heavyweight | Islem Masraf | def. | Mickaël Groguhe | KO (head kick and punches) | 1 | 0:10 |
| Lightweight | Patrick Habirora | def. | Claudio Pacella | Decision (unanimous) (30–27, 30–27, 29–28) | 3 | 5:00 |
| Lightweight | Connor Hughes | def. | Anatolij Baal | KO (punches) | 1 | 1:31 | (Note: 2024 PFL Europe Lightweight Quarter-Final) |
| Lightweight | Daniele Scatizzi | def. | Aleksandr Chizov | Submission (heel hook) | 1 | 1:59 | (Note: 2024 PFL Europe Lightweight Quarter-Final) |
| Welterweight | Florim Zendeli | def. | Tomasz Łangowski | Technical Submission (rear-naked choke) | 1 | 4:11 | (Note: 2024 PFL Europe Welterweight Quarter-Final) |
| Middleweight | Kevin Del | def. | Younes Najid | Submission (kneebar) | 1 | 1:10 |

== Brackets ==
=== Welterweight ===
Quarter-finals
(Poland) Tomasz Łangowski | 1r.
(Albania) Florim Zendeli | SUB
(France) Yassin Najid | 1r.
(Italy) Daniele Miceli | SUB
(Bulgaria) Marian Dimitrov
(Austria) Erhan Kartal
(The Gambia) Ibrahim Mané | SD
(Angola) Chequina Noso Pedro | 3r.

Semi-finals
(Albania) Florim Zendeli
(Italy) Daniele Miceli
(The Gambia) Ibrahim Mané

Final

=== Lightweight ===
Quarter-finals
(Poland) Jakub Kaszuba | UD
(England) Kane Mousah | 3r.
(Latvia) Aleksandr Chizov | 1r.
(Italy) Daniele Scatizzi | SUB
(France) Yazid Chouchane | 2r.
(Spain) Ignacio Capella | KO
(Germany) Anatolij Baal | 1r.
(England) Connor Hughes | KO

Semi-finals
(Poland) Jakub Kaszuba
(Italy) Daniele Scatizzi
(Spain) Ignacio Capella
(England) Connor Hughes

Final

== See also ==
- List of PFL events
- List of current PFL fighters
