= PFL 10 (2023) =

Mixed martial arts event

- The poster for PFL 10
- Promotion: Professional Fighters League
- Date: November 24, 2023
- Venue: The Anthem
- City: Washington, D.C., United States

Event chronology
PFL Europe 3	PFL 10	PFL Europe 4

The PFL 10 was a mixed martial arts event produced by the Professional Fighters League that took place on November 24, 2023, at The Anthem in Washington, D.C., United States. This was the finale of the playoffs for all 2023 divisions, with the winners getting a PFL World Championship and a $1 million cash prize.

== Background ==
The event marked the promotion's fourth visit to Washington, D.C. and first since PFL 10 (2018 season) in October 2018.

The event featured the six matchups for the $1 million dollar PFL World Championships in the 2023 season included a featherweight title bout between Jesus Pinedo and Gabriel Alves Braga in a rematch, a lightweight title bout between 2022 champion Olivier Aubin-Mercier and Clay Collard, a welterweight title bout between 2022 champion Sadibou Sy and 2018 champion Magomed Magomedkerimov, a light heavyweight bout between Josh Silveira and Impa Kasanganay, a heavyweight title bout between Denis Goltsov and Renan Ferreira, and a women's featherweight title bout between 2022 women's lightweight champion Larissa Pacheco and Marina Mokhnatkina.

A women's featherweight bout between 2019 and 2021 PFL Women's Lightweight Champion Kayla Harrison and former Bellator Women's Featherweight Champion Julia Budd was expected to take place at the event. However, Budd was removed from the fight because she "refused to fulfill her contractual obligation" and was replaced by Aspen Ladd at a catchweight of 150 pounds.

A featherweight bout between Chris Wade and Bubba Jenkins was scheduled at this event; however at weigh-ins, Wade came in at 148.4 pounds, which was 2.4 pounds north of the non-title. Jenkins turned down the catchweight bout and the bout was scrapped.

At weigh-ins, Ray Cooper III and Josh Blyden missed weight, coming in at 186.8 pounds, .8 pounds over the limit, and at 146.8 pounds, .8 pounds over the limit, respectively. Both were fined percentages of their purses which went to their opponents and the bouts proceeded at catchweights.

== Results ==
Main card (ESPN+ PPV)
Weight class				Method	Round	Time	Notes
Lightweight	Olivier Aubin-Mercier	def.	Clay Collard	Decision (unanimous) (49–46, 49–46, 49–46)	5	5:00	(Note: 2023 PFL World Lightweight Championship Tournament Final.)
Heavyweight	Renan Ferreira	def.	Denis Goltsov	TKO (punches)	2	0:26	(Note: 2023 PFL World Heavyweight Championship Tournament Final.)
Women's Featherweight	Larissa Pacheco	def.	Marina Mokhnatkina	Decision (unanimous) (49–46, 49–46, 49–46)	5	5:00	(Note: 2023 PFL Women's World Featherweight Championship Tournament Final.)
Welterweight	Magomed Magomedkerimov	def.	Sadibou Sy	Submission (guillotine choke)	3	1:17	(Note: 2023 PFL World Welterweight Championship Tournament Final.)
Light Heavyweight	Impa Kasanganay	def.	Josh Silveira	Decision (unanimous) (50–45, 50–45, 50–45)	5	5:00	(Note: 2023 PFL World Light Heavyweight Championship Tournament Final.)
Catchweight (150 lb)	Kayla Harrison	def.	Aspen Ladd	Decision (unanimous) (30–27, 30–27, 30–27)	3	5:00
Catchweight (187 lb)	Derek Brunson	def.	Ray Cooper III	Decision (unanimous) (30–27, 30–25, 30–25)	3	5:00	(Note: Cooper missed weight (186.8 lbs))
Preliminary card (ESPN+)
Featherweight	Jesus Pinedo	def.	Gabriel Alves Braga	TKO (punches)	3	0:58	(Note: 2023 PFL World Featherweight Championship Tournament Final.)
Lightweight	Biaggio Ali Walsh	def.	Joel Galarza Lopez	KO (punches)	2	1:24	(Note: Amateur bout.)
Bantamweight	Phil Caracappa	def.	Khai Wu	Decision (unanimous) (30–27, 29–28, 29–28)	3	5:00
Featherweight	Jesse Stirn	def.	Josh Blyden	Decision (unanimous) (29–28, 30–27, 30–27)	3	5:00	(Note: Blyden missed weight (146.8 lbs))

== Playoff brackets ==
=== 2023 PFL Heavyweight playoffs ===
Semifinals
1	(Russia) Denis Goltsov	SUB
4	(United States) Jordan Heiderman	1
2	(Brazil) Renan Ferreira	KO
5	(United States) Maurice Greene	1

Finals
1	(Russia) Denis Goltsov	2
2	(Brazil) Renan Ferreira	TKO

=== 2023 PFL Light Heavyweight playoffs ===
Semifinals
1	(United States) Josh Silveira	TKO
4	(United States) Ty Flores	1
2	(Norway) Marthin Hamlet	1
3	(United States) Impa Kasanganay	KO

Finals
1	(United States) Josh Silveira	5
3	(United States) Impa Kasanganay	UD

=== 2023 PFL Welterweight playoffs ===
Semifinals
1	(Russia) Magomed Magomedkerimov	UD
5	(United States) Solomon Renfro	3
2	(Brazil) Carlos Leal	3
3	(Sweden) Sadibou Sy	SD

Finals
1	(Russia) Magomed Magomedkerimov	SUB
3	(Sweden) Sadibou Sy	3

=== 2023 PFL Lightweight playoffs ===
Semifinals
1	(United States) Clay Collard	UD
4	(United States) Shane Burgos	3
2	(Canada) Olivier Aubin-Mercier	TKO
3	(Brazil) Bruno Miranda	2

Finals
1	(United States) Clay Collard	5
2	(Canada) Olivier Aubin-Mercier	UD

=== 2023 PFL Featherweight playoffs ===
Semifinals
1	(United States) Bubba Jenkins	2
4	(Peru) Jesus Pinedo	TKO
2	(Brazil) Gabriel Alves Braga	SD
5	(United States) Chris Wade	3

Finals
4	(Peru) Jesus Pinedo	TKO
2	(Brazil) Gabriel Alves Braga	3

=== 2023 PFL Women's Featherweight playoffs ===
Semifinals
1	(Brazil) Larissa Pacheco	TKO
4	(Ukraine) Olena Kolesnyk	1
2	(Russia) Marina Mokhnatkina	SUB
3	(United States) Amber Leibrock	1

Finals
1	(Brazil) Larissa Pacheco	UD
2	(Russia) Marina Mokhnatkina	5

Legend
(SD)	(Split Decision)
(UD)	(Unanimous Decision)
(MD)	(Majority Decision)
SUB	Submission
(T)KO	(Technical) Knock Out
L	Loss

== See also ==
- List of PFL events
- List of current PFL fighters
