= Jakub Kaszuba (fighter) =

Polish mixed martial arts (MMA) fighter (born 1995)

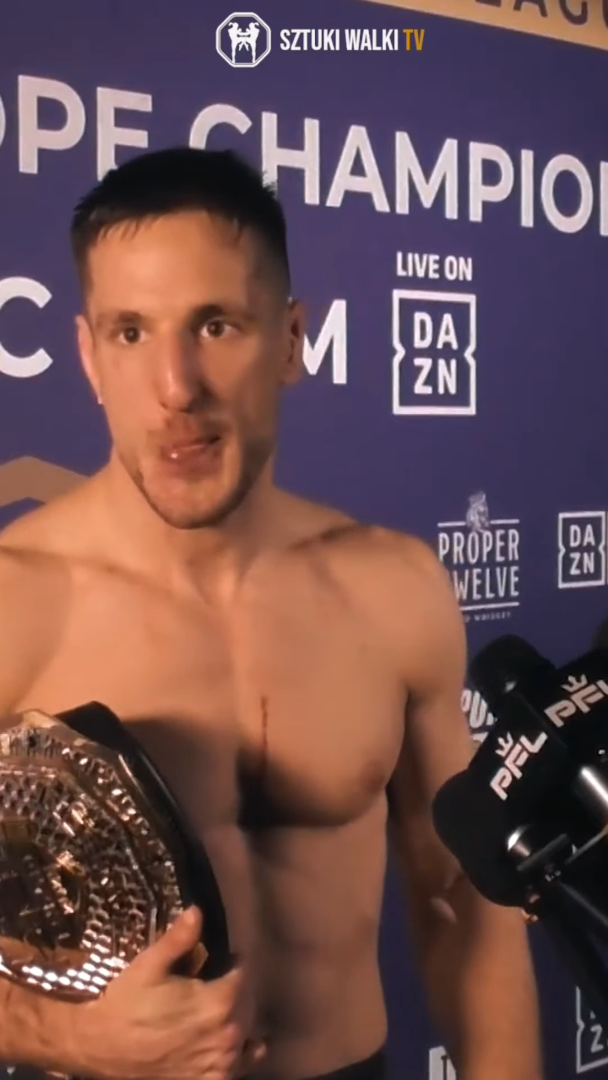
- Kaszuba in 2023
- Born: June 2, 1995 (age 31); Olsztyn, Poland
- Other names: The Boar; The Auditor
- Nationality: Polish
- Height: 5 ft 11 in (1.80 m)
- Weight: 154 lb (70 kg; 11.0 st)
- Division: Lightweight; Welterweight
- Style: Brazilian jiu-jitsu; karate; kickboxing; taekwondo
- Fighting out of: Jacksonville, Florida
- Team: Gracie Barra South Jax
- Years active: 2017–present

Mixed martial arts record
- Total: 16
- Wins: 16
- By knockout: 6
- By submission: 2
- By decision: 8
- Losses: 0

Other information
- Mixed martial arts record from Sherdog

Jakub Kaszuba (born June 2, 1995) is a Polish professional mixed martial artist. He currently competes in the lightweight division of the Professional Fighters League (PFL). He won the 2023 and 2024 PFL Europe Lightweight Championship.

== Background ==
Kaszuba was born in Olsztyn on June 2, 1995. He began to train in karate at the age of 7. A year later, he moved with his family to the United States. There, he trained extensively with his father, including taekwondo and kickboxing, in which he won the Florida championship at the age of 16. In September 2014, at the 3rd Polish Underground Cup held in Bochnia, in the Brazilian jiu-jitsu category, he finished in 2nd place in the -64 kg junior category.

== Mixed martial arts career ==
=== Early career ===
In 2015, Kaszuba switched to mixed martial arts, winning 5 amateur fights, mainly in the lightweight category (up to 70.3 kg/155 lb). Then he turned professional, joining a Florida-based promotion called Combat Night. He made his professional debut in this promotion on 1 April 2017 in the lightweight division, where he won by technical knockout (punches) in the third round against Joshua Timms. During his time in Combat Night, he had won all eight bouts, including November 5, 2022 bout at Combat Night: Duval, where Kaszuba defeated Nico Cocuccio by TKO to become the Combat Night lightweight champion.

=== Professional Fighters League ===
==== 2023 season ====
In February 2023, the Professional Fighters League (PFL) announced they had signed Kaszuba to take part in the lightweight tournament in the second PFL Europe event scheduled for July 8 in Berlin, entitled PFL Europe 2. In his PFL debut, Kaszuba faced Maxim Radu at the afformentioned PFL Europe 2. He won the bout by submission via rear-naked choke in the first round, after which he advanced to the semi-final of the lightweight tournament.

Kaszuba faced Dylan Tuke on September 30, 2023, at PFL Europe 3. He won the by unanimous decision, advancing to the final of the PFL Europe play-offs.

Kaszuba faced John Mitchell on December 8, 2023, at PFL Europe 4. He won the bout by second-round TKO to win the 2023 Lightweight tournament and the $100,000 collective prize, earning him a spot in the 2024 PFL season.

==== 2024 season ====
Kaszuba faced Kane Mousah on March 7, 2024, at PFL Europe 1. He won the bout by unanimous decision.

Heading to the Europe Lightweight Tournament semi-final, Kaszuba next faced Daniele Scatizzi at PFL Europe 3 on September 28, 2024. He won the fight via unanimous decision.

In the final fight at the PFL Europe Lightweight Tournament, Kaszuba faced Connor Hughes on December 14, 2024, at PFL Europe 4. He won the bout by knockout in the fourth round. Kaszuba thus won the European tournament for the second time and $100,000.

==== 2025–present ====
Kaszuba faced Sergio Cossio on August 1, 2025, at PFL 8. He won the bout by unanimous decision.

Kaszuba faced Natan Schulte on March 28, 2026, at PFL Pittsburgh: Eblen vs. Battle. He won the bout by unanimous decision.

Kaszuba was scheduled to face Gadzhi Rabadanov on August 22, 2026, at PFL Tampa. However, Kaszuba pulled out from the event and was replaced by Tracy Reeder.

== Championships and accomplishments ==
- Professional Fighters League
  - 2023 PFL Europe Lightweight Championship
  - 2024 PFL Europe Lightweight Championship
- Combat Night
  - Combat Night Lightweight Championship (One time)

== Mixed martial arts record ==
Professional record breakdown
16 matches	16 wins	0 losses
By knockout	6	0
By submission	2	0
By decision	8	0

Res.	Record	Opponent	Method	Event	Date	Round	Time	Location	Notes
Win	16–0	Natan Schulte	Decision (unanimous)	PFL Pittsburgh: Eblen vs. Battle	March 28, 2026	3	5:00	Moon Township, Pennsylvania, United States	
Win	15–0	Sergio Cossio	Decision (unanimous)	PFL 8 (2025)	August 1, 2025	3	5:00	Atlantic City, New Jersey, United States	
Win	14–0	Connor Hughes	TKO (elbows)	PFL Europe 4 (2024)	December 14, 2024	4	4:07	Décines-Charpieu, France	Won the 2024 PFL Europe Lightweight Tournament.
Win	13–0	Daniele Scatizzi	Decision (unanimous)	PFL Europe 3 (2024)	September 28, 2024	3	5:00	Glasgow, Scotland	2024 PFL Europe Lightweight Tournament Semifinal.
Win	12–0	Kane Mousah	Decision (unanimous)	PFL Europe 1 (2024)	March 7, 2024	3	5:00	Paris, France	2024 PFL Europe Lightweight Tournament Quarterfinal.
Win	11–0	John Mitchell	TKO (knees and punches)	PFL Europe 4 (2023)	December 8, 2023	2	3:07	Dublin, Ireland	Won the 2023 PFL Europe Lightweight Tournament.
Win	10–0	Dylan Tuke	Decision (unanimous)	PFL Europe 3 (2023)	September 30, 2023	3	5:00	Paris, France	2023 PFL Europe Lightweight Tournament Semifinal.
Win	9–0	Maxim Radu	Submission (rear-naked choke)	PFL Europe 2 (2023)	July 8, 2023	1	3:18	Berlin, Germany	2023 PFL Europe Lightweight Tournament Quarterfinal.
Win	8–0	Nico Cocuccio	TKO (punches)	Combat Night: Duval 1	November 5, 2022	2	2:33	Jacksonville, Florida, United States	Won the vacant Combat Night Lightweight Championship.
Win	7–0	Carlos Alexandre	Submission (rear-naked choke)	Combat Night Pro: Tallahassee 3	August 20, 2022	3	4:43	Tallahassee, Florida, United States	
Win	6–0	Timothy Teves	Decision (unanimous)	Combat Night Pro: Tallahassee 2	February 19, 2022	3	5:00	Tallahassee, Florida, United States	
Win	5–0	John Ortolani	TKO (punches)	Combat Night: Pro 19	December 12, 2020	2	4:59	Tallahassee, Florida, United States	
Win	4–0	John Marquez	Decision (unanimous)	Combat Night: Pro 15	November 9, 2019	3	5:00	Jacksonville, Florida, United States	Catchweight (160 lb) bout.
Win	3–0	Jayro Martinez	TKO (punches)	Combat Night: Pro 13	July 20, 2019	3	2:14	Tallahassee, Florida, United States	Lightweight debut.
Win	2–0	Javanis Ross	Decision (unanimous)	Combat Night: Pro 11	March 16, 2019	3	5:00	Jacksonville, Florida, United States	Catchweight (160 lb) bout.
Win	1–0	Joshua Timms	TKO (punches)	Combat Night: Pro 2	April 1, 2017	3	0:29	Sarasota, Florida, United States	Welterweight debut.

== See also ==
- List of current PFL fighters
- List of male mixed martial artists
