= Bubba Jenkins =

American wrestler and mixed martial arts fighter (born 1988)

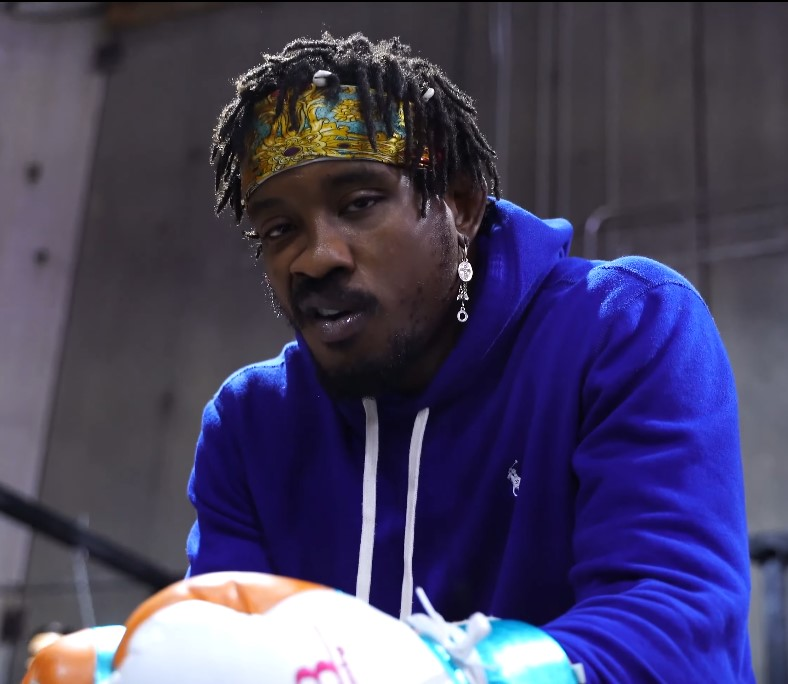
- Jenkins in 2021
- Born: February 5, 1988 (age 38); Frankfurt, Germany
- Other names: I'm A Bad Man
- Nationality: American
- Height: 5 ft 7 in (1.70 m)
- Weight: 145 lb (66 kg; 10.4 st)
- Division: Featherweight; Lightweight
- Reach: 70 in (178 cm)
- Style: Wrestling
- Fighting out of: Huntington Beach, California, U.S.
- Team: Kings MMA; Blackhouse MMA; American Top Team (former)
- Wrestling: NCAA Division I Wrestling
- Years active: 2011–present

Mixed martial arts record
- Total: 30
- Wins: 21
- By knockout: 6
- By submission: 5
- By decision: 10
- Losses: 9
- By knockout: 5
- By submission: 2
- By decision: 2

Other information
- University: Pennsylvania State University; Arizona State University
- Notable schools: Cox High School; First Colonial High School
- Website: bubbabadmanjenkins.com
- Mixed martial arts record from Sherdog

Bubba Jenkins (born February 5, 1988) is an American mixed martial artist and former amateur wrestler. He currently competes in the featherweight division. He has also notably competed for Bellator MMA, Absolute Championship Berkut, Professional Fighters League (PFL), and Brave Combat Federation, where he is a former champion.

As an amateur wrestler, Jenkins was a freestyle junior world champion and an NCAA Division I champion. He has also competed for Real American Freestyle (RAF) and worked for the company as a sports commentator.

== Wrestling ==
=== High school ===
Jenkins attended Cox High School in Virginia Beach, Virginia for three years before transferring his senior year to First Colonial High School, also in Virginia Beach. As a high school wrestler, he was a VHSL Group AAA wrestling state champion and a NHSCA senior national champion.

=== College ===
In 2006, Jenkins committed to the Penn State Nittany Lions.

==== 2006-07 ====
Freshman: Competing at 157 pounds, Jenkins went 23-12 during the regular season. He placed sixth at the Big Ten tournament with three victories and three defeats.

==== 2007-08 ====
Sophomore: Before the season started, Jenkins won a gold medal at the Junior World Championships in freestyle at 66 kilograms. Competing at 149 pounds, he downed the accomplished Jordan Burroughs in a close 3-2 match. He went 2–2 at the Big Tens, downing Lance Palmer twice and losing to Brent Metcalf and Josh Churella, placing fifth. At the NCAAs, he did exceptionally well, going 4-1 and becoming the runner-up to Metcalf.

==== 2008-09 ====
Junior: He finished the regular season with a 22–0 record. He went 2-0 at the Big Ten tournament to reach the final, but suffered an injury and was forced to forfeit and earn runner-up honors. At the NCAAs, Jenkins was affected by the injury and finished 0–2 at the tournament.

==== 2009-10 ====
Redshirt: Jenkins redshirted this season because of athletic and academic issues.

==== 2010-11 ====
Senior: When Cael Sanderson arrived as the new head coach at PSU, Jenkins did not feel comfortable with Sanderson's teaching and Sanderson felt uncomfortable with Jenkins' style. This caused him to transfer to Arizona State University. In his first and only year with the Sun Devils, Jenkins captured an NCAA title by pinning previously unbeaten Nittany Lion and future world champion and Olympic gold medalist David Taylor in the final. Jenkins graduated as an NCAA champion, two-time finalist, and two-time All-American.

=== Appearances post-career ===
==== 2013 ====
Jenkins wrestled two-time NCAA champion (2011 and 2013) Jordan Oliver in a folkstyle match on November 1–3, at the 2013 Who's Number One dual meet. He lost the match by points (2-8).

Jenkins was scheduled to wrestle against Kyle Dake in a freestyle match on December 1 at the 2013 Grapple at the Garden event. However, Dake pulled out due to an injury suffered while competing and was replaced by 2012 NCAA champion Frank Molinaro, in a folkstyle match instead. Jenkins defeated his former teammate by points (4-2).

==== 2020 ====
After 7 years of no competition, Jenkins faced highly competitive wrestler Jason Nolf in a freestyle match on October 20, as a headliner for the NLWC Event II. He was defeated by technical fall in the first period.

=== RAF ===
Jenkins was hired as a sports commentator for Real American Freestyle in 2025. He later competed for the promotion, losing to David Carr at RAF 06 on February 28, 2026.

== Mixed martial arts career ==
Jenkins made his mixed martial arts debut in the Lightweight division on December 2, 2011 at Tachi Palace Fights 11: Redemption. Jenkins defeated Josh Williams by submission TKO in the first round. Jenkins returned for his second fight at Tachi Palace Fights 12: Second Coming on March 9, 2010 He defeated Chris Gomez via rear-naked choke in the first round.

Bubba Jenkins is managed by Daniel A. Martinez of Di-Cypher & Associates.

=== Resurrection Fighting Alliance ===
One week before Bubba Jenkins defeated Chris Gomez at Tachi Palace Fights 12 - Second Coming, he signed an exclusive 6-fight deal with Resurrection Fighting Alliance (RFA).

On June 30, 2012, Jenkins made his promotional debut for the RFA against highly decorated amateur boxer Jesus Adame at RFA 3 - Stevenson vs. Cochrane. Jenkins quickly slammed Adame to the ground and submitted him via Rear Naked Choke at 1:08 of the first round.

=== The Ultimate Fighter 17: Coaching staff ===
On October 31, 2012, it was announced that Jenkins joined Jon Jones' coaching staff on the seventeenth season of the UFC produced reality television show The Ultimate Fighter. The first episode of The Ultimate Fighter: Team Jones vs. Team Sonnen premiered on Tuesday, January 22, 2013 at 8 ET/PT on FX Networks.

=== Bellator MMA ===
On May 31, 2013, Bellator MMA announced they had signed Jenkins to a long term promotional agreement and he will make his debut in the summer.

Jenkins took on Mike Barreras at Bellator 97. He won the fight via TKO in the second round.

Jenkins returned to the Bellator cage at Bellator 100 against LaRue Burley on September 20, 2013. He suffered the first defeat of his professional MMA career as he was stopped by Burley via strikes in the third round.

The following November, Jenkins would defeat Ian Rammel due to strikes in the third round at Bellator 109.

Jenkins then faced Sean Powers at Bellator 114 on March 28, 2014. Jenkins won via unanimous decision.

On July 25, 2014, Jenkins faced Poppies Martinez at Bellator 122. Jenkins defeated Martinez via strikes at 4:10 in the first round.

Jenkins faced Thiago Meller at Bellator 126 on September 26, 2014 in Phoenix, Arizona. He won the fight via unanimous decision.

After moving from the Bellator Lightweight division to Featherweight, Jenkins faced former WSOF Featherweight Champion Georgi Karakhanyan on January 16, 2015 at Bellator 132. He lost the fight via technical submission in the first round.

Jenkins faced Joe Wilk on June 26, 2015 at Bellator 139. He won the fight via TKO in the second round.

Jenkins faced Jordan Parsons on November 20, 2015 at Bellator 146. He won the fight via split decision.

Jenkins then faced Georgi Karakhanyan a rematch at Bellator 160 on August 26, 2016 at a catchweight of 150lbs. because Karakhanyan failed to make weight. Jenkins made the weight. He was favored to win the rematch, but Karakhanyan won, this time at 150lbs., via knock out the first minute into the first round.

=== Absolute Championship Berkut ===
After signed a contract with the ACB Jenkins faced with Ali Bagov on 11 March 2017 at ACB 54. He lost the fight by technical submission in the second round.

In the second fight he beat Diego Marlon on 23 September 2017 at ACB 70 via knockout in the third round.

=== Brave CF ===
On July 27, 2018 it was announced that Jenkins had signed a multi-fight contract with Brave Combat Federation. Jenkins made his promotional debut against the reigning featherweight champion Elias Boudegzdame at Brave CF 16 on September 21, 2018. Jenkins won the fight via unanimous decision and became the champion.

On July 25, 2019, Jenkins successfully defended his featherweight title by first-round TKO against Lucas Martins at Brave CF 24.

=== Professional Fighters League ===
==== 2021 season ====
In March 2020, Jenkins signed with Professional Fighters League. Jenkins faced former collegiate wrestling rival Lance Palmer in his promotional debut, on April 23, 2021 at PFL 1. He won the bout via unanimous decision.

Jenkins was scheduled to face Anthony Dizy at PFL 4 on June 10, 2021. However, on May 24, it was announced that Dizy had to pull out of the bout and was replaced by Bobby Moffett. Jenkins won the bout via unanimous decision.

Jenkins faced Chris Wade in the Semifinals off the Featherweight tournament on August 27, 2021 at PFL 9. He lost the bout via unanimous decision.

==== 2022 season ====
Jenkins was scheduled to face Sung Bin Jo on April 28, 2022 at PFL 2. After Jo Sungbin pulled out of the bout, he was replaced by Kyle Bochniak. He won the bout via unanimous decision.

Jenkins was scheduled to face Saba Bolaghi on June 24, 2022 at PFL 5. However Bolaghi pulled out of the bout and was replaced by Reinaldo Ekson. Jenkins won the bout via unanimous decision.

Jenkins faced Ryoji Kudo in the Semifinals off the Featherweight tournament on August 13, 2022 at PFL 8. He won the bout via rear-naked choke in the first round.

Jenkins faced Brendan Loughnane in the finals of the Featherweight tournament on November 25, 2022 at PFL 10. He lost the bout via TKO stoppage in the fourth round.

==== 2023 season ====
Jenkins started off the 2023 season in a rematch against Chris Wade on April 1, 2023 at PFL 1. He won the bout via unanimous decision.

Jenkins faced Sung Bin Jo on June 8, 2023 at PFL 4. He won the fight via a technical submission due to a rear-naked choke in the first round.

In the Featherweight semi-finals, Jenkins faced Jesus Pinedo in the main event at PFL 7 on August 4, 2023. At weigh-ins, Jesus Pinedo weighed in at 146.4 pounds, 0.4 pounds over the Featherweight limit. He was fined 20 percent of his purse, which went to his opponent Jenkins, and he started the bout with a one point subtraction. Jenkins went on to lose the bout via TKO in the second round.

Jenkins was scheduled to rematch Chris Wade on November 24, 2023 at PFL 10, however at weigh-ins, Wade came in at148.4 pounds, which was 2.4 pounds north of the non-title. Jenkins turned down the catchweight bout and the bout was scrapped.

==== 2024 season ====
Jenkins faced Kai Kamaka III on April 19, 2024 at PFL 3 (2024). He lost the bout via unanimous decision.

Jenkins next faced Gabriel Alves Braga at PFL 6 (2024) on June 28, 2024. At weigh-ins, Gabriel Alves Braga came in at 150.6 lbs, 4.6 pounds over the limit for featherweight. He was fined 20% of his purse and given a point deduction in the standings. He lost the fight via TKO due to arm injury in the second round.

==== Global Fight League ====
On December 11, 2024, it was announced that Jenkins was eligible to be drafted in the Global Fight League. However, he was not drafted for the 2025 season. In turn, in April 2025, it was reported that all GFL events were cancelled indefinitely.

== Championships and accomplishments ==
=== Collegiate wrestling ===
- National Collegiate Athletic Association
  - NCAA Division I All-American out of Pennsylvania State University (2008) and Arizona State University (2011)
  - NCAA Division I 149 lb: Runner-up out of Pennsylvania State University (2008)
  - NCAA Division I 157 lb: Champion out of Arizona State University (2011)
- Big Ten Conference
  - B1G 149 lb: Sixth placer out of Pennsylvania State University (2007)
  - B1G 149 lb: Runner-up out of Pennsylvania State University (2009)

== Mixed martial arts record ==
Professional record breakdown
30 matches	21 wins	9 losses
By knockout	7	5
By submission	4	2
By decision	10	2

Res.	Record	Opponent	Method	Event	Date	Round	Time	Location	Notes
Loss	21–9	Gabriel Alves Braga	TKO (arm injury)	PFL 6 (2024)	June 28, 2024	2	1:48	Sioux Falls, South Dakota, United States	Catchweight (150.6 lb) bout; Braga missed weight.
Loss	21–8	Kai Kamaka III	Decision (unanimous)	PFL 3 (2024)	April 19, 2024	3	5:00	Chicago, Illinois, United States	
Loss	21–7	Jesus Pinedo	TKO (punches)	PFL 7 (2023)	August 4, 2023	2	4:40	San Antonio, Texas, United States	2023 PFL Featherweight Tournament Semifinal; Pinedo missed weight (146.4 lb).
Win	21–6	Jo Sung-bin	Technical Submission (rear-naked choke)	PFL 4 (2023)	June 8, 2023	1	1:25	Atlanta, Georgia, United States	
Win	20–6	Chris Wade	Decision (unanimous)	PFL 1 (2023)	April 1, 2023	3	5:00	Las Vegas, Nevada, United States	
Loss	19–6	Brendan Loughnane	TKO (punches)	PFL 10 (2022)	November 25, 2022	4	2:38	New York City, New York, United States	2022 PFL Featherweight Tournament Final.
Win	19–5	Ryoji Kudo	Submission (rear-naked choke)	PFL 9 (2022)	August 20, 2022	1	1:49	London, England	2022 PFL Featherweight Tournament Semifinal.
Win	18–5	Reinaldo Ekson	Decision (unanimous)	PFL 5 (2022)	June 24, 2022	3	5:00	Atlanta, Georgia, United States	
Win	17–5	Kyle Bochniak	Decision (unanimous)	PFL 2 (2022)	April 28, 2022	3	5:00	Arlington, Texas, United States	
Loss	16–5	Chris Wade	Decision (unanimous)	PFL 9 (2021)	August 27, 2021	3	5:00	Hollywood, Florida, United States	2021 PFL Featherweight Tournament Semifinal.
Win	16–4	Bobby Moffett	Decision (unanimous)	PFL 4 (2021)	June 10, 2021	3	5:00	Atlantic City, New Jersey, United States	
Win	15–4	Lance Palmer	Decision (unanimous)	PFL 1 (2021)	April 23, 2021	3	5:00	Atlantic City, New Jersey, United States	
Win	14–4	Lucas Martins	TKO (punches)	Brave CF 24	July 25, 2019	1	2:48	London, England	Defended the Brave CF Featherweight Championship.
Win	13–4	Elias Boudegzdame	Decision (unanimous)	Brave CF 16	September 21, 2018	5	5:00	Abu Dhabi, United Arab Emirates	Won the Brave CF Featherweight Championship.
Win	12–4	Diego Marlon	KO (punches)	ACB 70	September 23, 2017	3	0:44	Sheffield, England	Catchweight (148 lb) bout.
Loss	11–4	Ali Bagov	Technical Submission (inverted triangle choke)	ACB 54	March 1, 2017	2	4:01	Manchester, England	Catchweight (160 lb) bout.
Loss	11–3	Georgi Karakhanyan	KO (punch)	Bellator 160	August 26, 2016	1	0:53	Anaheim, California, United States	Catchweight (149 lb) bout.
Win	11–2	Goiti Yamauchi	Decision (unanimous)	Bellator 151	March 4, 2016	3	5:00	Thackerville, Oklahoma, United States	
Win	10–2	Jordan Parsons	Decision (split)	Bellator 146	November 20, 2015	3	5:00	Thackerville, Oklahoma, United States	
Win	9–2	Joe Wilk	TKO (punches)	Bellator 139	June 26, 2015	2	1:00	Mulvane, Kansas, United States	
Loss	8–2	Georgi Karakhanyan	Technical Submission (guillotine choke)	Bellator 132	January 16, 2015	1	1:49	Temecula, California, United States	
Win	8–1	Thiago Meller	Decision (unanimous)	Bellator 126	September 26, 2014	3	5:00	Phoenix, Arizona, United States	
Win	7–1	Poppies Martinez	TKO (punches)	Bellator 122	July 25, 2014	1	4:10	Temecula, California, United States	Featherweight debut.
Win	6–1	Sean Powers	Decision (unanimous)	Bellator 114	March 28, 2014	3	5:00	West Valley City, Utah, United States	
Win	5–1	Ian Rammel	TKO (punches)	Bellator 109	November 22, 2013	3	2:38	Bethlehem, Pennsylvania, United States	
Loss	4–1	LaRue Burley	TKO (punches)	Bellator 100	September 20, 2013	3	3:40	Phoenix, Arizona, United States	
Win	4–0	Mike Barreras	TKO (punches)	Bellator 97	July 31, 2013	2	1:05	Rio Rancho, New Mexico, United States	
Win	3–0	Jesus Adame	Submission (rear-naked choke)	RFA 3	June 30, 2012	1	1:08	Kearney, Nebraska, United States	
Win	2–0	Chris Gomez	Submission (rear-naked choke)	Tachi Palace Fights 12	March 9, 2012	1	2:07	Lemoore, California, United States	
Win	1–0	Josh Williams	TKO (submission to punches)	Tachi Palace Fights 11	December 2, 2011	1	2:04	Lemoore, California, United States	Lightweight debut.

== NCAA record ==
NCAA Championships Matches
Res.	Record	Opponent	Score	Date	Event
2011 NCAA Championships (gold) at 157 lbs
Win	10-5	David Taylor	Fall	March 20, 2011	2011 NCAA Division I Wrestling Championships
Win	9-5	Jason Welch	4-1	March 20, 2011	2011 NCAA Division I Wrestling Championships
Win	8-5	Paul Young	4-3	March 20, 2011	2011 NCAA Division I Wrestling Championships
Win	7-5	Mark Lewandowski	Fall	March 20, 2011	2011 NCAA Division I Wrestling Championships
Win	6-5	Alex Medved	MD 16-5	March 20, 2011	2011 NCAA Division I Wrestling Championships
2009 NCAA Championships at 149 lbs
Loss	5-5	David Jauregui	MD 1-10	March 19, 2009	2009 NCAA Division I Wrestling Championships
Loss	5-4	Matt Fittery	6-12	March 19, 2009	2009 NCAA Division I Wrestling Championships
2008 NCAA Championships (silver) at 149 lbs
Loss	5-3	Brent Metcalf	8-14	March 22, 2008	2008 NCAA Division I Wrestling Championships
Win	5-2	Darrion Caldwell	12-8	March 22, 2008	2008 NCAA Division I Wrestling Championships
Win	4-2	J.P O'Connor	5-3	March 22, 2008	2008 NCAA Division I Wrestling Championships
Win	3-2	Ryan Lang	4-3	March 22, 2008	2008 NCAA Division I Wrestling Championships
Win	2-2	Bryce Saddoris	Major 15-5	March 22, 2008	2008 NCAA Division I Wrestling Championships
2007 NCAA Championships at 157 lbs
Loss	1-2	Seth Martin	Fall	March 15, 2007	2007 NCAA Division I Wrestling Championships
Loss	1-1	James Strouse	0-4	March 15, 2007	2007 NCAA Division I Wrestling Championships
Win	1-0	Michael Chandler	MD 15-3	March 15, 2007	2007 NCAA Division I Wrestling Championships

== See also ==
- List of male mixed martial artists
