= Jesus Pinedo =

Peruvian mixed martial arts fighter

- Born: June 22, 1996 (age 30); Callao, Peru
- Other names: El Mudo
- Height: 6 ft 0 in (1.83 m)
- Weight: 145 lb (66 kg; 10 st 5 lb)
- Division: Featherweight
- Reach: 74 in (188 cm)
- Fighting out of: Lima, Peru
- Team: Pitbull Martial Arts Center
- Years active: 2013–present

Mixed martial arts record
- Total: 35
- Wins: 26
- By knockout: 17
- By submission: 4
- By decision: 5
- Losses: 7
- By knockout: 3
- By decision: 4
- Draws: 1
- No contests: 1

Other information
- Mixed martial arts record from Sherdog

Jesus Pinedo (born June 22, 1996) is a Peruvian mixed martial artist who competes in the Featherweight division of Professional Fighters League (PFL). He won the 2023 PFL Featherweight Championship. In October 2023, Pinedo reached No. 10 in World Featherweight rankings according to Fight Matrix. As of January 27, 2026, he is #3 in the PFL featherweight rankings.

== Background ==
Jesus Pinedo closely associated with coach Iván Ibérico, a renowned MBA figure in Peru, and has maintained a strong bond since the age of 16–17. While martial arts have been a lifelong passion, the individual initially dabbled in various contact sports from the age of 5 or 6, sporadically engaging in disciplines such as judo and karate during vacations or brief periods throughout the year. Unlike his peers who favored soccer, Pinedo's inclination towards mixed martial arts became evident early on, steering their sporting trajectory in a distinct direction. He was involved in fighting in his youth, leading to his father putting him into pre-military boarding school.

== Mixed martial arts career ==
=== Early career ===
Pinedo's handlers embraced the baptism-by-fire approach, leading him to make his professional debut just under a month after his 17th birthday. On July 17, 2013, he showcased his skills by swiftly dispatching Luigi Dapello with first-round punches at a regional event. During his teenage years, Pinedo fearlessly stepped into the ring 14 times, amassing a commendable record of 9–4–1 in those early battles. His name, "El Mudo," has become synonymous with success, as he claimed titles in both the 300 Sparta and Inka Fighting Championship organizations. Pinedo's crowning moment came when he secured the IFC featherweight championship, forcing Joackim Pedro Neto Ferreira to tap out to a guillotine choke in the first round of their February 2018 clash. Just four months later, he added another feather to his cap by clinching the 300 Sparta featherweight title, unleashing a barrage of second-round punches that spelled the end for Carlos Alexadre.

=== Ultimate Fighting Championship ===
Pinedo made his UFC debut replacing an injured Claudio Puelles against Devin Powell on November 17, 2018 at UFC Fight Night 140, winning the fight via unanimous decision.

Pinedo once again replaced an injured fighter, this time Nasrat Haqparast, against John Makdessi on March 23, 2019, at UFC Fight Night 148, losing the fight via unanimous decision.

Days after the Peruvian fighter broke ties with the Iridium Sports agency, owned by well-known manager Jason House, the UFC let go of Pinedo.

=== Professional Fighters League ===
==== 2023 ====
After winning his next 4 bouts on the Peruvian regional scene all by stoppages, Pinedo made his PFL debut against Gabriel Alves Braga on April 1, 2023 at PFL 1, losing the close bout via split decision.

Pinedo faced Brendan Loughnane on June 8, 2023 at PFL 4. He won the fight via knockout early into the first round, becoming the first fighter to finish Loughnane in his MMA career.

In the Featherweight semi-finals, Pinedo faced Bubba Jenkins in the main event at PFL 7 on August 4, 2023. At weigh-ins, Jesus Pinedo weighed in at 146.4 pounds, 0.4 pounds over the Featherweight limit. He was fined 20 percent of his purse, which went to his opponent Jenkins, and he started the bout with a one point subtraction. Pinedo went on to win the bout via TKO in the second round.

Heading into the finals of the featherweight tournament, Pinedo rematched Gabriel Alves Braga on November 24, 2023, at PFL 10. He avenged the previous loss and won the bout by TKO stoppage at the beginning of the third round to win the 2023 PFL Featherweight Championship and $1 million collective dollar prize.

==== 2024 ====
Pinedo was scheduled to face Bellator Featherweight Champion Patrício Pitbull in a 3 round non-title crossover fight, on February 24, 2024, at PFL vs. Bellator. However, Pinedo pulled out a week before the fight with a back injury.

Pinedo was scheduled to face Jeremy Kennedy on November 29, 2024, at PFL 10. However, Pinedo withdrew for unknown reasons and was replaced by Gabriel Alves Braga.

==== 2025 ====
On February 12, 2025, the promotion officially revealed that Pinedo joined the 2025 PFL Featherweight Tournament.

In the opening round, he faced Ádám Borics at PFL 1 on April 3, 2025. He won the fight via TKO in the first round.

In the semifinals, Pinedo faced Gabriel Braga in a rubber match at PFL 5 (2025) on June 12, 2025. He won the fight via TKO in the first round.

In the final, Pinedo faced Movlid Khaybulaev on August 1, 2025, at PFL 8. He lost the bout via submission in the fifth round.

==== 2026 ====
Pinedo faced Salamat Isbulaev on February 7, 2026, at PFL Dubai: Nurmagomedov vs. Davis, and lost the bout via TKO in the first round.

Pinedo was scheduled to face Levy Saúl Marroquín on July 18, 2026, at PFL Austin, but Marroquín pulled out from the event and was replaced by Joey Ruquet. At the weigh-ins, Pinedo weighed in at 146.8 pounds, 0.8 pounds over the featherweight non-title fight limit and he was fined a percentage of his purse, which went to Ruquet. He won the fight via technical knockout in round one.

== Championships and accomplishments ==
=== Mixed martial arts ===
- Professional Fighters League
  - 2023 PFL Featherweight Championship
- Inka Fighting Championship
  - IFC Featherweight Championship (One time)
- 300 Sparta
  - 300S Featherweight Championship (One time)
- MMA Fighting
  - 2023 Second Team MMA All-Star

== Mixed martial arts record ==
Professional record breakdown
35 matches	26 wins	7 losses
By knockout	17	3
By submission	4	0
By decision	5	4
Draws	1	
No contests	1	

Res.	Record	Opponent	Method	Event	Date	Round	Time	Location	Notes
Win	26–7–1 (1)	Joey Ruquet	TKO (punches and elbows)	PFL Austin: Eblen vs. Kasanganay 2	July 18, 2026	1	4:50	Austin, Texas, United States	Catchweight (146.8 lb) bout; Pinedo missed weight.
Loss	25–7–1 (1)	Salamat Isbulaev	TKO (submission to elbows)	PFL Dubai: Nurmagomedov vs. Davis	February 7, 2026	1	4:57	Dubai, United Arab Emirates	
NC	25–6–1 (1)	Movlid Khaybulaev	NC (overturned)	PFL 8 (2025)	August 1, 2025	5	1:17	Atlantic City, New Jersey, United States	2025 PFL Featherweight Tournament Final. Originally a submission (arm-triangle choke) win for Khaybulaev; overturned after he tested positive for banned substance.
Win	25–6–1	Gabriel Braga	TKO (punches)	PFL 5 (2025)	June 12, 2025	1	1:16	Nashville, Tennessee, United States	2025 PFL Featherweight Tournament Semifinal.
Win	24–6–1	Ádám Borics	TKO (punches)	PFL 1 (2025)	April 3, 2025	1	3:43	Orlando, Florida, United States	2025 PFL Featherweight Tournament Quarterfinal.
Win	23–6–1	Gabriel Braga	TKO (punches)	PFL 10 (2023)	November 24, 2023	3	0:58	Washington, D.C., United States	Won the 2023 PFL Featherweight Tournament.
Win	22–6–1	Bubba Jenkins	TKO (punches)	PFL 7 (2023)	August 4, 2023	2	4:40	San Antonio, Texas, United States	2023 PFL Featherweight Tournament Semifinal; Pinedo missed weight (146.4 lb).
Win	21–6–1	Brendan Loughnane	KO (knee and punches)	PFL 4 (2023)	June 8, 2023	1	1:34	Atlanta, Georgia, United States	
Loss	20–6–1	Gabriel Braga	Decision (split)	PFL 1 (2023)	April 1, 2023	3	5:00	Las Vegas, Nevada, United States	
Win	20–5–1	Genison Lima	TKO (punches)	Inka FC 33	July 10, 2022	1	4:05	Lima, Peru	
Win	19–5–1	Elicardo Silva	KO (punches)	Arena Global 10	February 12, 2021	1	1:15	Rio de Janeiro, Brazil	
Win	18–5–1	Kaio Tavares	TKO (elbows and punches)	Inka FC 33	February 26, 2020	1	2:27	Lima, Peru	
Win	17–5–1	Jose Luis Alegre	TKO (punches)	Iquitos Combat Championship 6	October 19, 2019	2	2:37	Iquitos, Peru	Return to Featherweight.
Loss	16–5–1	John Makdessi	Decision (unanimous)	UFC Fight Night: Thompson vs. Pettis	March 23, 2019	3	5:00	Nashville, Tennessee, United States	
Win	16–4–1	Devin Powell	Decision (unanimous)	UFC Fight Night: Magny vs. Ponzinibbio	November 17, 2018	3	5:00	Buenos Aires, Argentina	Return to Lightweight.
Win	15–4–1	Carlos Alexandre	TKO (punches)	300 Sparta 26	June 15, 2018	2	3:13	Lima, Peru	Won the 300S Featherweight Championship.
Win	14–4–1	Joackim Neto	Submission (guillotine choke)	Inka FC 27	February 18, 2018	1	2:25	Lima, Peru	Won the IFC Featherweight Championship.
Win	13–4–1	Jefferson Angulo	Submission (triangle choke)	Extreme MMA 11	July 1, 2017	1	2:46	Cuenca, Ecuador	Lightweight bout.
Win	12–4–1	Alonso Verona	Submission (triangle choke)	Redemption Fighters 3	March 22, 2017	3	2:18	Lima, Peru	
Win	11–4–1	Guilherme Cadena	TKO (punches)	300 Sparta 12	August 31, 2016	1	3:04	Lima, Peru	
Win	10–4–1	Marcelino Cavalcante	TKO (punches)	300 Sparta 11	June 30, 2016	1	3:17	Lima, Peru	
Loss	9–4–1	Alonso Verona	KO (punches)	Inka FC: Warriors 5	December 16, 2015	1	0:09	Lima, Peru	For the IFC Featherweight Championship.
Win	9–3–1	Federico Gentiluomo	Decision (unanimous)	Arena Tour 7	September 19, 2015	3	5:00	Buenos Aires, Argentina	
Win	8–3–1	Cicero Coutinho	TKO (punches)	Inka FC: Warriors 4	July 17, 2015	1	1:37	Trujillo, Peru	
Win	7–3–1	Jonathan Ortega	TKO (punches)	Arena Tour 6	June 26, 2015	1		Cordoba, Argentina	
Win	6–3–1	Sidney Guzman	Submission (armbar)	Peru FC 19	December 3, 2014	1	3:49	Lima, Peru	
Win	5–3–1	Jack Guzman	TKO (punches)	Inka FC: Warriors 2	October 25, 2014	1	2:18	Lima, Peru	
Draw	4–3–1	Jose Zarauz	Draw (majority)	Peru FC 18	September 17, 2014	3	5:00	Lima, Peru	
Loss	4–3	Javier Oyarzabal	TKO (punches)	Arena Tour 3	August 15, 2014	2		Buenos Aires, Argentina	
Loss	4–2	Humberto Bandenay	Decision (split)	Inka FC 26	May 24, 2014	3	5:00	Lima, Peru	
Win	4–1	Victor Arata	Decision (unanimous)	Inka FC 25	April 16, 2014	3	5:00	Lima, Peru	
Win	3–1	Marlon Gonzales	Decision (unanimous)	300 Sparta 5	February 4, 2014	3	5:00	Lima, Peru	
Loss	2–1	Jose Manuel Guevara	Decision (unanimous)	300 Sparta 4	October 10, 2013	3	5:00	Lima, Peru	
Win	2–0	Miguel Morales	Decision (unanimous)	300 Sparta 3	September 16, 2013	3	5:00	Lima, Peru	
Win	1–0	Luigi Dapello	TKO (punches)	300 Sparta 2	July 17, 2013	1	2:23	Lima, Peru	

== See also ==
- List of current PFL fighters
- List of male mixed martial artists
