= PFL 7 (2023) =

Mixed martial arts event

- The poster for PFL 7
- Promotion: Professional Fighters League
- Date: August 4, 2023
- Venue: Boeing Center at Tech Port
- City: San Antonio, Texas, United States

Event chronology
PFL Europe 2	PFL 7	PFL 8

PFL 7 was a mixed martial arts event produced by the Professional Fighters League that took place on August 4, 2023, at the Boeing Center at Tech Port in San Antonio, Texas, United States. This marked the semi-final playoffs for the Featherweight and Light Heavyweight divisions.

== Background ==
The event was headlined by Bubba Jenkins facing off against Jesus Pinedo in an attempt to reach the featherweight finals. Pinedo secured his playoff spot after stunningly knocking out Brendan Loughnane, the 2022 PFL champion, in the first round. Jenkins, who lost his bid for the PFL title to Loughnane in 2022, aimed to make it to the finals again this August.

The featherweight bracket's other pairing was to involve former PFL champion Movlid Khaybulaev and Gabriel Braga, battling for a spot in this year's finals. However Khaybulaev pulled out due to undisclosed reasons and was replaced by Chris Wade.

In the light heavyweight division, Josh Silveira competed against Ty Flores, and Marthin Hamlet squared off with ex-UFC fighter Impa Kasanganay.

At weigh-ins, Jesus Pinedo weighed in at 146.4 pounds, 0.4 pounds over the Featherweight limit. He was fined 20 percent of his purse, which went to his opponent Jenkins, and he started the bout with a one point subtraction. Keoni Diggs weighed in at 156.4 pounds, 0.4 pounds over the Lightweight limit, leading him to being fined 20% of his purse which went to his opponent Elvin Espinoza.

== Results ==
Main card (ESPN / ESPN+)
Weight class				Method	Round	Time	Notes
Featherweight	Jesus Pinedo	def.	Bubba Jenkins	TKO (punches)	2	4:40	(Note: Semi-final bout of the PFL Featherweight playoffs. Pinedo missed weight (146.4 lbs))
Light Heavyweight	Josh Silveira	def.	Ty Flores	TKO (knees)	1	4:46	(Note: Semi-final bout of the PFL Light Heavyweight playoffs.)
Featherweight	Gabriel Alves Braga	def.	Chris Wade	Decision (split) (27–30, 30–27, 29–28)	3	5:00	(Note: Semi-final bout of the PFL Featherweight playoffs.)
Light Heavyweight	Impa Kasanganay	def.	Marthin Hamlet	KO (punches)	1	2:24	(Note: Semi-final bout of the PFL Light Heavyweight playoffs.)
Lightweight	Elvin Espinoza	def.	Keoni Diggs	Decision (unanimous) (29–28, 29–28, 29–28)	3	5:00	(Note: Diggs missed weight (156.4 lbs))
Preliminary card (ESPN+)
Welterweight	Thad Jean	def.	Ali Omar	TKO (punches)	1	1:54
Women's Flyweight	Lisa Mauldin	def.	Desiree Yanez	Submission (rear-naked choke)	1	3:05
Welterweight	Anthony Ivy	def.	Carson Hardman	Submission (rear-naked choke)	1	2:34
Women's Flyweight	Chelsea Hackett	def.	Ky Bennett	Submission (rear-naked choke)	2	4:42
Light Heavyweight	Billy Elekana	def.	Chuck Campbell	Decision (split) (28–29, 29–28, 29–28)	3	5:00

== Playoff brackets ==
=== 2023 PFL Light Heavyweight playoffs ===
Semifinals
1	(United States) Josh Silveira	TKO
4	(United States) Ty Flores	1
2	(Norway) Marthin Hamlet	1
3	(United States) Impa Kasanganay	KO

Finals
1	(United States) Josh Silveira
3	(United States) Impa Kasanganay

=== 2023 PFL Featherweight playoffs ===
Semifinals
1	(United States) Bubba Jenkins	2
4	(Peru) Jesus Pinedo	TKO
2	(Brazil) Gabriel Alves Braga	SD
5	(United States) Chris Wade	3

Finals
4	(Peru) Jesus Pinedo
2	(Brazil) Gabriel Alves Braga

Legend
(SD)	(Split Decision)
(UD)	(Unanimous Decision)
(MD)	(Majority Decision)
SUB	Submission
(T)KO	(Technical) Knock Out
L	Loss

== See also ==
- List of PFL events
- List of current PFL fighters
