= PFL Europe 4 (2023) =

Mixed martial arts event

- The poster for PFL Europe 4
- Promotion: Professional Fighters League
- Date: December 8, 2023
- Venue: 3Arena
- City: Dublin, Ireland

Event chronology
PFL 10	PFL Europe 4	PFL vs. Bellator

PFL Europe 4 was a mixed martial arts event produced by the Professional Fighters League that took place on December 8, 2023, at 3Arena in Dublin, Ireland.

== Background ==
The event featured the finals of four divisions in the PFL Europe 2023 season. A non-tournament lightweight bout between Andreeas Binder and Daniele Scatizzi was scheduled for the undercard but was cancelled.

== Results ==
Main card (DAZN)
Weight class				Method	Round	Time	Notes
Featherweight	Nathan Kelly	def.	Dimitry Solimeis	Submission (rear-naked choke)	1	4:47
Bantamweight	Khurshed Kakhorov	def.	Frans Mlambo	TKO (punches)	2	2:32	(Note: 2023 PFL Europe Bantamweight Final.)
Lightweight	Jakub Kaszuba	def.	John Mitchell	TKO (punches)	2	3:07	(Note: 2023 PFL Europe Lightweight Final.)
Lightweight	Dylan Tuke	def.	Yazid Chouchane	Submission (rear-naked choke)	2	2:36	(Note: 2024 PFL Europe Lightweight Qualifier.)
Women's Flyweight	Dakota Ditcheva	def.	Valentina Scatizzi	TKO (doctor stoppage)	1	5:00	(Note: 2023 PFL Europe Women's Flyweight Final.)
Light Heavyweight	Jakob Nedoh	def.	Simeon Powell	TKO (punches)	2	1:16	(Note: 2023 PFL Europe Light Heavyweight Final.)
Preliminary card (YouTube / DAZN)
Bantamweight	Weslley Maia	def.	Lewis McGrillen-Evans	Decision (unanimous) (29–28, 29–28, 29–28)	3	5:00	(Note: 2024 PFL Europe Bantamweight Qualifier)
Featherweight	Brett Johns	def.	David Tonatiuh Crol	TKO (punches)	3	3:09
Light Heavyweight	Tom Breese	def.	Cleiton Silva	Submission (rear-naked choke)	1	3:30	(Note: 2024 PFL Global League Qualifier.)
Bantamweight	Kikadze Bondo	def.	Dominique Wooding	Decision (unanimous) (29–26, 29–27, 29–27)	3	5:00	(Note: 2024 PFL Europe Bantamweight Qualifier.)
Lightweight	Connor Hughes	def.	Sebastian Santana Guedes	TKO (retirement)	1	5:00	(Note: 2024 PFL Europe Lightweight Qualifier.)
Amateur bouts
Flyweight	Nate Kelly	def.	Calum Seaton	Submission (anaconda choke)	2	0:51

== Brackets ==
=== Light Heavyweight ===
Quarter-finals
(Netherlands) Mohamed Amine	2r.
(England) Simeón Powell	SUB
(Spain) Abdellah Er-Ramy	TKO
(Romania) Mădălin Pîrvulescu	1r.
(Italy) Riccardo Nosiglia	1r.
(Slovenia) Jakob Nedoh	KO
(France) Anthony Salamone	TKO
(Spain) Daniel Ladero	1r.

Semi-finals
(England) Simeón Powell	UD
(Spain) Daniel Ladero (Note: Er-Ramy wasn not medically cleared and was replaced by Daniel Ladero)	3r.
(Slovenia) Jakob Nedoh	TKO
(France) Anthony Salamone	1r.

Final
(England) Simeón Powell	2r.
(Slovenia) Jakob Nedoh	TKO

=== Lightweight ===
Quarter-finals
(Latvia) Aleksandr Chizov (Note: Officially a Unanimous decision victory for Duque, Chizov advanced due to the weight miss by Duque)	DRAW
(Spain) Acoidan Duque	3r.
(Republic of Ireland) John Mitchell	UD
(France) Geysim Derouiche	3r.
(England) Connor Hughes	3r.
(Republic of Ireland) Dylan Tuke	UD
(Italy) Maxim Radu	1r.
(Poland) Jakub Kaszuba	SUB

Semi-finals
(France) Geysim Derouiche (Note: Chizov missed weight and was replaced by Geysim Derouiche)	3r.
(Republic of Ireland) John Mitchell	UD
(Republic of Ireland) Dylan Tuke	3r.
(Poland) Jakub Kaszuba	UD

Final
(Republic of Ireland) John Mitchell	2r.
(Poland) Jakub Kaszuba	TKO

=== Bantamweight ===
Quarter-finals
(Italy) Francesco Nuzzi	KO
Farbod Iran Nezhad	1r.
(South Africa) Frans Mlambo	MD
(Spain) Rachid Haz	3r.
(France) Moktar Benkaci	3r.
(Tajikistan) Khurshed Kakhorov	UD
(Sweden) Ali Taleb	TKO
(Switzerland) Kenji Bortoluzzi	1r.

Semi-finals
(France) Moktar Benkaci (Note: Francesco Nuzzi pulled out of the bout and was replaced by Moktar Benkaci)	3r.
(South Africa) Frans Mlambo	SD
(Tajikistan) Khurshed Kakhorov	UD
(Sweden) Ali Taleb	3r.

Final
(South Africa) Frans Mlambo	2r.
(Tajikistan) Khurshed Kakhorov	TKO

=== Women's Flyweight ===
Quarter-finals
(England) Dakota Ditcheva	SUB
(Sweden) Malin Hermansson	1r.
(Poland) Marta Waliczek	3r.
(Sweden) Cornelia Holm	SD
(Germany) Lorena Cubero	3r.
(Belgium) Griet Eeckhout	UD
(Italy) Valentina Scatizzi	SD
(Netherlands) Lizzy Gevers	3r.

Semi-finals
(England) Dakota Ditcheva	KO
(Sweden) Cornelia Holm	3r.
(Italy) Manuela Marconetto (Note: Griet Eeckhout pulled out of the bout and was replaced by Manuela Marconetto)	—
(Italy) Valentina Scatizzi	BYE (Note: Marconetto missed weight and Scatizzi therefore got a bye to the finals)

Final
(England) Dakota Ditcheva	TKO
(Italy) Valentina Scatizzi	1r.

== See also ==
- List of PFL events
- List of current PFL fighters
