= PFL 1 (2023) =

Professional Fighters League MMA event in 2023

- The poster for PFL 1
- Promotion: Professional Fighters League
- Date: April 1, 2023
- Venue: The Theater at Virgin Hotels
- City: Las Vegas, Nevada, United States

Event chronology
PFL Europe 1	PFL 1	PFL 2

The PFL 1 mixed martial arts event for the 2023 season of the Professional Fighters League was held on April 1, 2023, at The Theater at Virgin Hotels in Las Vegas, Nevada, United States. This marked the first regular-season event of the tournament and included fights in the Featherweight and Light Heavyweight divisions.

== Background ==
The first event of 2023 feature a bout between Brendan Loughnane and Marlon Moraes in the featherweight division. Meanwhile, Rob Wilkinson faced Thiago Santos, a former UFC title challenger, in the co-main event.

A light heavyweight bout between Omari Akhmedov and Will Fleury was expected to take place at the event. However, Akhmedov was forced to withdraw due to suffering an injury and was replaced by Krzysztof Jotko.

Sung Bin Jo was expected to face Jesus Pinedo. However, Jo was not medically cleared and was replaced by alternate Gabriel Alves Braga.

== Results ==
Main card (ESPN / ESPN+)
Weight class				Method	Round	Time	Notes
Featherweight	Brendan Loughnane	def.	Marlon Moraes	TKO (leg kicks)	2	1:11
Light Heavyweight	Rob Wilkinson	vs.	Thiago Santos	No Contest (overturned)	3	5:00	(Note: Originally a Decision (unanimous) win for Wilkinson; result overturned after Wilkinson failed a drug test)
Light Heavyweight	Will Fleury	vs.	Krzysztof Jotko	No Contest (overturned)	3	5:00	(Note: Originally a Decision (split) win for Fleury; result overturned after Fleury failed a drug test)
Featherweight	Movlid Khaybulaev	def.	Ryoji Kudo	Decision (unanimous) (30–27, 30–27, 30–27)	3	5:00
Featherweight	Bubba Jenkins	def.	Chris Wade	Decision (unanimous) (30–27, 30–27, 30–27)	3	5:00
Preliminary card (ESPN+)
Light Heavyweight	Marthin Hamlet	def.	Mohammed Fakhreddine	Submission (face crank)	1	1:05
Light Heavyweight	Joshua Silveira	def.	Sam Kei	Submission (rear-naked choke)	1	2:46
Featherweight	Alejandro Flores	vs.	Daniel Torres	No Contest (overturned)	3	5:00	(Note: Originally a Decision (unanimous) win for Flores; result overturned after Flores failed a drug test)
Featherweight	Gabriel Alves Braga	def.	Jesus Pinedo	Decision (split) (28–29, 29–28, 29–28)	3	5:00
Light Heavyweight	Ty Flores	def.	Delan Monte	Decision (unanimous) (29–28, 29–28, 29–27)	3	5:00
Light Heavyweight	Impa Kasanganay	def.	Cory Hendricks	Decision (unanimous) (29–28, 29–28, 30–27)	3	5:00

== Standings after event ==
The PFL points system is based on results of the match. The winner of a fight receives 3 points. If the fight ends in a draw, both fighters will receive 1 point. The bonus for winning a fight in the first, second, or third round is 3 points, 2 points, and 1 point respectively. The bonus for winning in the third round requires a fight be stopped before 4:59 of the third round. No bonus point will be awarded if a fighter wins via decision. For example, if a fighter wins a fight in the first round, then the fighter will receive 6 total points. A decision win will result in three total points. If a fighter misses weight, the opponent (should they comply with weight limits) will receive 3 points due to a walkover victory, regardless of winning or losing the bout; if the non-offending fighter subsequently wins with a stoppage, all bonus points will be awarded.

=== Light Heavyweight ===
Fighter	Wins	Draws	Losses	1st	2nd	3rd	Total Points (Note: The four fighters with most points advance to the playoffs)
(Norway) Marthin Hamlet	1	0	0	1	0	0	6
(United States) Josh Silveira	1	0	0	1	0	0	6
(United States) Ty Flores	1	0	0	0	0	0	3
(Australia) Rob Wilkinson	1	0	0	0	0	0	3
(Republic of Ireland) Will Fleury	1	0	0	0	0	0	3
(Poland) Krzysztof Jotko	0	0	1	0	0	0	0
(Brazil) Thiago Santos	0	0	1	0	0	0	0
(Brazil) Delan Monte	0	0	1	0	0	0	0
(Tonga) Sam Kei	0	0	1	0	0	0	0
(Lebanon) Mohammad Fakhreddine	0	0	1	0	0	0	0

=== Featherweight ===
Fighter	Wins	Draws	Losses	1st	2nd	3rd	Total Points (Note: The four fighters with most points advance to the playoffs)
(England) Brendan Loughnane	1	0	0	0	1	0	5
(United States) Bubba Jenkins	1	0	0	0	0	0	3
(Russia) Movlid Khaybulaev	1	0	0	0	0	0	3
(Mexico) Alejandro Flores	1	0	0	0	0	0	3
(Brazil) Gabriel Alves Braga	1	0	0	0	0	0	3
(Peru) Jesus Pinedo	0	0	1	0	0	0	0
(Austria) Daniel Torres	0	0	1	0	0	0	0
(Japan) Ryoji Kudo	0	0	1	0	0	0	0
(United States) Chris Wade	0	0	1	0	0	0	0
(Brazil) Marlon Moraes	0	0	1	0	0	0	0

== See also ==
- List of PFL events
- List of current PFL fighters
