= Dakota Ditcheva =

British Muay Thai fighter and mixed martial artist

- Born: Dakota Lili-Joa Ditcheva; 25 July 1998 (age 28); Sale, Greater Manchester, England
- Other names: Dangerous
- Nationality: British; Bulgarian
- Height: 5 ft 8 in (1.73 m)
- Weight: 125 lb (57 kg; 8 st 13 lb)
- Division: Flyweight
- Reach: 70 in (178 cm)
- Style: Muay Thai, Kickboxing
- Fighting out of: Manchester, England
- Team: Manchester Top Team; American Top Team
- Years active: 2012–present

Kickboxing record
- Total: 11
- Wins: 10
- Losses: 1

Mixed martial arts record
- Total: 16
- Wins: 16
- By knockout: 12
- By submission: 1
- By decision: 3
- Losses: 0

Other information
- Notable relatives: Lisa Howarth (mother)
- Mixed martial arts record from Sherdog

Dakota Lili-Joa Ditcheva (Bulgarian: Дакота Дичева; born 25 July 1998) is a British mixed martial artist and former Muay Thai fighter currently competing in the women's Flyweight division of the Professional Fighters League (PFL). As of January 27, 2026, she is #1 in the PFL women's flyweight rankings.

She was part of the British team at the 2016 International Federation of Muaythai Amateur World Championships in Jönköping, Sweden, winning gold. She is an overall three-time world champion in the junior divisions and Daily Mirror and Sport England Pride of Sports Young Sportsperson of the Year.

== Background ==
Born on 25 July 1998, in Sale, Greater Manchester, England, Dakota Ditcheva grew up in a family of martial artists. Her father, Ivo Ditchev, is Bulgarian, born in Samokov. Her mother, Lisa Howarth, a multiple-time world kickboxing champion, had influenced Dakota's interest in combat sports. Immersed in this environment from a young age, Dakota began her training in various martial arts disciplines, including kickboxing, Muay Thai, and later, Brazilian jiu-jitsu.

Before transitioning to professional mixed martial arts (MMA), Dakota competed in kickboxing and Muay Thai, winning championships in both disciplines. In May 2016, she represented Great Britain at the International Federation of Muaythai Associations (IFMA) World Championships, where she earned a gold medal in the female junior 57 kg division.

Dakota describes herself as having two nationalities, English and Bulgarian. She regularly flies a double English-Bulgarian flag and feels proud of both her backgrounds. She speaks a bit of Bulgarian and travels to the country several times per year to visit relatives.

Dakota is a lifelong fan of football club Manchester City.

== Mixed martial arts career ==
In April 2021, Dakota secured a first-round stoppage victory over fellow debutant Jenny Line at Cage Steel 25. Her second fight at Celtic Gladiator 30, five months later, saw a similar outcome, as she defeated Kerry Isom with a first-round TKO.

At UKFC 17, she secured victory in the first round against Patricia Borges. Her performance caught the attention of international promotions, leading her appearance at PAWFC 1 in Canada. There, she co-headlined the event against Simone da Silva, finishing the fight in the second round with ground strikes.

Dakota then headed to UAE Warriors 28. Facing another rising star, Paula Cristina, she secured a unanimous decision victory.

=== Professional Fighters League ===
In July 2022, it was announced that Ditcheva had signed with PFL.

During her PFL MMA debut at PFL 9 in London, Ditcheva overcame Hassana Gaber with a first-round TKO. At the PFL 10 preliminary card, she achieved a first-round knockout against Katherine Corogenes, marking her sixth knockout win in her professional career.

Ditcheva faced Malin Hermansson in the inaugural PFL Europe season on 25 March 2023 at PFL Europe 1. She won the bout in the first round, submitting Hermansson via rear-naked choke.

Ditcheva faced Cornelia Holm in the semifinals at PFL Europe 3 on 30 September 2023, defeating Holm via body punch KO in the third round.

In the PFL Europe Women's Flyweight final, Ditcheva faced Valentina Scatizzi at PFL Europe 4 on 8 December 2023. She won the fight via TKO between the first and second rounds after the cage-side doctor determined Scatizzi's eye was too swollen to continue.

Ditcheva faced Lisa Mauldin at PFL 1 on 4 April 2024 and won the bout by technical knockout by a knee to the body and punches.

Ditcheva faced Chelsea Hackett on 13 June 2024 at PFL 4. She won the fight via body punch TKO in the first round.

Ditcheva next faced Jena Bishop in the semi-finals of the 2024 Women's Flyweight tournament at PFL 7 on 2 August 2024, winning the bout via TKO in the first round.

In the final, Ditcheva faced Taila Santos on 29 November 2024, at PFL 10. She won the tournament and $1 million prize by technical knockout via body punches in the second round, being the first to finish Santos, and also becoming the youngest champion in PFL history and the first British female MMA world champion.

Ditcheva faced Sumiko Inaba on 19 July 2025, at PFL Champions Series 2. Despite breaking her left hand, she won the bout by unanimous decision.

Ditcheva was scheduled to face Denise Kielholtz in a flyweight bout at PFL Dubai: Nurmagomedov vs. Davis on 7 February 2026, but had to withdraw from the fight due to an injury. The bout was re-scheduled and took place on 31 July 2026, at PFL New York. Ditcheva won the bout via unanimous decision.

== Championships and accomplishments ==
=== Mixed martial arts ===
- Professional Fighters League
  - 2024 PFL Women's Flyweight Championship
  - 2023 PFL Europe Women's Flyweight Championship
- ESPN
  - 2024 Non-UFC Female Fighter of the Year
- MMA Junkie
  - 2024 Female Fighter of the Year
- LowKick MMA
  - 2024 Female Fighter of the Year
- Bloody Elbow
  - 2024 Breakout Star of the Year shared with Joaquin Buckley
- Combat Press
  - 2024 Female Fighter of the Year
- Cageside Press
  - 2022 Women's Flyweight Prospect of the Year
  - 2024 Female Fighter of the Year
- Uncrowned
  - 2024 Female Fighter of the Year
- MMA Mania
  - 2024 #5 Ranked Fighter of the Year
- MMA Fighting
  - 2022 Third Team MMA All-Star
  - 2023 Second Team MMA All-Star
  - 2024 First Team MMA All-Star

=== Muay Thai ===
- International Sport Kickboxing Association
  - 2016 ISKA Muay Thai British Super Atomweight (-50.5 kg) Championship
- International Federation of Muaythai Associations
  - 2016 IFMA World Muaythai Championships in Jönköping, Sweden (gold) Female Junior -57 kg

== Mixed martial arts record ==
Professional record breakdown
16 matches	16 wins	0 losses
By knockout	12	0
By submission	1	0
By decision	3	0

Res.	Record	Opponent	Method	Event	Date	Round	Time	Location	Notes
Win	16–0	Denise Kielholtz	Decision (unanimous)	PFL New York: Nurmagomedov vs. Colgan	31 July 2026	3	5:00	Elmont, New York, United States	
Win	15–0	Sumiko Inaba	Decision (unanimous)	PFL Champions Series 2	19 July 2025	3	5:00	Cape Town, South Africa	
Win	14–0	Taila Santos	TKO (punches to the body)	PFL 10 (2024)	29 November 2024	2	4:41	Riyadh, Saudi Arabia	Won the 2024 PFL Women's Flyweight Tournament.
Win	13–0	Jena Bishop	TKO (front kick to the body and punch)	PFL 7 (2024)	2 August 2024	1	3:54	Nashville, Tennessee, United States	2024 PFL Women's Flyweight Tournament Semifinal.
Win	12–0	Chelsea Hackett	TKO (punch to the body)	PFL 4 (2024)	13 June 2024	1	3:22	Uncasville, Connecticut, United States	
Win	11–0	Lisa Mauldin	TKO (knee to the body and punches)	PFL 1 (2024)	4 April 2024	1	3:54	San Antonio, Texas, United States	
Win	10–0	Valentina Scatizzi	TKO (doctor stoppage)	PFL Europe 4 (2023)	8 December 2023	1	5:00	Dublin, Ireland	Won the 2023 PFL Europe Women's Flyweight Tournament.
Win	9–0	Cornelia Holm	KO (punch to the body)	PFL Europe 3 (2023)	30 September 2023	3	2:55	Paris, France	2023 PFL Europe Women's Flyweight Tournament Semifinal.
Win	8–0	Malin Hermansson	Submission (rear-naked choke)	PFL Europe 1 (2023)	25 March 2023	1	3:52	Newcastle, England	2023 PFL Europe Women's Flyweight Tournament Quarterfinal.
Win	7–0	Katherine Corogenes	KO (punch)	PFL 10 (2022)	25 November 2022	1	4:20	New York City, New York, United States	
Win	6–0	Hassna Gaber	TKO (submission to knee to the body)	PFL 9 (2022)	20 August 2022	1	0:58	London, England	
Win	5–0	Paula Cristina	Decision (unanimous)	UAE Warriors 28	26 March 2022	3	5:00	Abu Dhabi, United Arab Emirates	Flyweight debut.
Win	4–0	Simone da Silva	TKO (punches)	Pallas Athena Women's FC 1	15 January 2022	2	3:43	Calgary, Alberta, Canada	
Win	3–0	Patricia Borges	TKO (elbows)	UK Fighting Championships 17	27 November 2021	1	3:58	Preston, England	Catchweight (130 lb) bout.
Win	2–0	Kerry Isom	TKO (punches)	Celtic Gladiator 30	12 September 2021	1	4:49	Blackburn, England	Catchweight (132 lb) bout.
Win	1–0	Jenny Line	TKO (elbows and knees)	Caged Steel 25	10 April 2021	1	2:04	Sheffield, England	Bantamweight debut.

== Muay Thai record ==
Professional Muay Thai record
10 Wins , 1 Loss
Date	Result	Opponent	Event	Location	Method	Round	Time
25-03-2017	Loss	Amy Pirnie	Yokkao 23 & 24	Bolton, Greater Manchester, England, United Kingdom	Decision	5	3:00
12-02-2017	Win	Kat Paton	Tanko Muay Thai League 1	Manchester, England, United Kingdom	TKO	1	2:00
25-06-2016	Win	Katia Pinto	Machines on Fire	St Helens, England, United Kingdom	Decision	5	3:00
14-05-2016	Win	Emma Bragg	The Tanko Main Event	Bolton, England, United Kingdom	TKO	2	
Wins the ISKA Muay Thai British 51kg Championship.
19-03-2016	Win	NN	Yokkao 17 & 18	Bolton, Greater Manchester, England, United Kingdom	TKO	1	
21-11-2015	Win	Myriame Djedidi	The Road to the Main Event	Ashton-under-Lyne, England, United Kingdom	Decision	5	2:00
24-04-2015	Win	Hongfah Kor. Jalanfak	Bangla Boxing Stadium	Phuket, Thailand	TKO (knee)	1	
21-03-2015	Win	Sophie Lowe	Yokkao 12 & Yokkao 13	England, United Kingdom	TKO (referee stoppage)		
22-11-2014	Win	Jennifer Gallagher	The Road to the Main Event	Ashton-under-Lyne, England, United Kingdom	Decision	5	1:30
01-11-2014	Win	Cory McKenna	2 Raw 2 Ready	Manchester, England, United Kingdom	Decision	5	2:00
Legend: Win Loss Draw/No contest Notes

== See also ==
- List of female mixed martial artists
- List of current PFL fighters
