= PFL 4 (2023) =

Mixed martial arts event

- The poster for PFL 4
- Promotion: Professional Fighters League
- Date: June 8, 2023
- Venue: Overtime Elite Arena
- City: Atlanta, Georgia, United States

Event chronology
PFL 3	PFL 4	PFL 5

PFL 4 was a mixed martial arts event produced by the Professional Fighters League that took place on June 8, 2023, at the Overtime Elite Arena in, Atlanta, Georgia, United States. This marked the fourth regular-season event of the tournament and included fights in the Featherweight and Light heavyweight divisions.

== Background ==
The 2023 PFL regular season continued on June 8, featuring featherweight and light heavyweight matches. After the first three events in Las Vegas, the series moves to Overtime Elite Arena in Atlanta, with live broadcasts on ESPN and ESPN+.

In the main event, 2022 featherweight champion Brendan Loughnane faced Jesus Pinedo. Loughnane started the 2023 season with a victory over Marlon Moraes, while Pinedo lost a close match to Gabriel Braga. Loughnane leads the featherweight standings with 5 points.

The co-main event, in the light heavyweight division, was to have 2022 champion Rob Wilkinson going against Will Fleury. Wilkinson won his first match of the season against former UFC title challenger Thiago Santos, while Fleury defeated Krzysztof Jotko.

However, a bevy of failed drug tests changed this card as nine PFL fighters were suspended by the Nevada State Athletic Commission included former UFC title challenger Thiago Santos, former PFL heavyweight champion Bruno Cappelozza, Krzystof Jotko, Rizvan Kuniev, Mohammed Fakhreddine, Cezar Ferreira, Will Fleury, Alejandro Flores, and Daniel Torres. In light of the recent suspensions, Ty Flores stepped in for Will Fleury to fight Rob Wilkinson in a light heavyweight match, but Wilkinson subsequently failed a drug test and was replaced by Dan Spohn; Tyler Diamond replaced Daniel Torres against Movlid Khaybulaev in a featherweight bout; Gabriel Braga replaced Alejandro Flores to fight Marlon Moraes in another featherweight bout; Taylor Johnson and UFC veteran Andrew Sanchez joined the light heavyweight season to replace the suspended fighters and faced each other; Impa Kasanganay and Tim Caron, new additions to the light heavyweight season, competed against each other; and a scheduled feature fight between Thiago Santos and Mohammed Fakhreddine was cancelled.

At weigh-ins, Ty Flores weighed in at 211.2 pounds, 5.2 pounds over the Light Heavyweight limit. He was fined 20% of his purse which went to his opponent Spohn and he was given a one point penalty in the standings and is also unable to win points in case he wins the bout.

== Results ==
Main card (ESPN / ESPN+)
Weight class				Method	Round	Time	Notes
Featherweight	Jesus Pinedo	def.	Brendan Loughnane	KO (knee and punches)	1	1:34
Featherweight	Movlid Khaybulaev	def.	Tyler Diamond	Submission (arm-triangle choke)	2	4:23
Light Heavyweight	Marthin Hamlet	def.	Sam Kei	Decision (unanimous) (29–28, 29–28, 29–28)	3	5:00
Featherweight	Bubba Jenkins	def.	Sung Bin Jo	Technical Submission (rear-naked choke)	1	1:25
Light Heavyweight	Josh Silveira	def.	Delan Monte	TKO (knee injury)	1	1:30
Preliminary card (ESPN+)
Featherweight	Gabriel Alves Braga	def.	Marlon Moraes	TKO (punches)	1	3:02
Light Heavyweight	Ty Flores	def.	Daniel Spohn	Decision (unanimous) (29–28, 29–28, 30–27)	3	5:00	(Note: Flores missed weight (211.2 lbs))
Featherweight	Chris Wade	def.	Ryoji Kudo	Technical Submission (guillotine choke)	1	4:15
Light Heavyweight	Impa Kasanganay	def.	Tim Caron	Submission (arm-triangle choke)	2	3:52
Light Heavyweight	Andrew Sanchez	def.	Taylor Johnson	Decision (split) (29–27, 27–29, 29–27)	3	5:00	(Note: Johnson was deducted 1 point in Round 1 for an illegal knee.)
Women's Featherweight	Abigail Montes	def.	Brandy Hester	TKO (punches)	1	3:06
Featherweight	Alexei Pergande	def.	Akeem Bashir	Submission (D'arce choke)	1	3:14

== Standings after event ==
The PFL points system is based on results of the match. The winner of a fight receives 3 points. If the fight ends in a draw, both fighters will receive 1 point. The bonus for winning a fight in the first, second, or third round is 3 points, 2 points, and 1 point respectively. The bonus for winning in the third round requires a fight be stopped before 4:59 of the third round. No bonus point will be awarded if a fighter wins via decision. For example, if a fighter wins a fight in the first round, then the fighter will receive 6 total points. A decision win will result in three total points. If a fighter misses weight, the opponent (should they comply with weight limits) will receive 3 points due to a walkover victory, regardless of winning or losing the bout; if the non-offending fighter subsequently wins with a stoppage, all bonus points will be awarded.

=== Light Heavyweight ===
Fighter	Wins	Draws	Losses	1st	2nd	3rd	Total Points (Note: The four fighters with most points advance to the playoffs)
(United States) Josh Silveira	2	0	0	2	0	0	12
(Norway) Marthin Hamlet	2	0	0	1	0	0	9
(United States) Impa Kasanganay	1	0	0	0	1	0	5
(United States) Ty Flores	2	0	0	0	0	0	3
(United States) Andrew Sanchez	1	0	0	0	0	0	3
(Tonga) Sam Kei	0	0	2	0	0	0	0
(Brazil) Delan Monte	0	0	2	0	0	0	0
(United States) Taylor Johnson	0	0	1	0	0	0	0
(United States) Daniel Spohn	0	0	1	0	0	0	0
(United States) Tim Caron	0	0	1	0	0	0	0

=== Featherweight ===
Fighter	Wins	Draws	Losses	1st	2nd	3rd	Total Points (Note: The four fighters with most points advance to the playoffs)
(United States) Bubba Jenkins	2	0	0	1	0	0	9
(Brazil) Gabriel Alves Braga	2	0	0	1	0	0	9
(Russia) Movlid Khaybulaev	2	0	0	0	1	0	8
(Peru) Jesus Pinedo	1	0	1	1	0	0	6
(United States) Chris Wade	1	0	1	1	0	0	6
(England) Brendan Loughnane	1	0	1	0	1	0	5
(Brazil) Marlon Moraes	0	0	2	0	0	0	0
(Japan) Ryoji Kudo	0	0	2	0	0	0	0
(United States) Tyler Diamond	0	0	1	0	0	0	0
(South Korea) Sung Bin Jo	0	0	1	0	0	0	0

== Reported payout ==
The following is the reported payout to the fighters as reported to the Georgia Athletic Commission. The amounts do not include sponsor money, discretionary bonuses, viewership points, or additional earnings.

- Jesus Pinedo: $30,000 (includes $15,000 win bonus) def. Brendan Loughnane: $50,000
- Movlid Khaybulaev: $100,000 (includes $50,000 win bonus) def. Tyler Diamond: $15,000
- Marthin Hamlet: $56,000 (includes $28,000 win bonus) def. Sam Kei: $10,000
- Bubba Jenkins: $100,000 (includes $50,000 win bonus) def. Sung Bin Jo: $13,000
- Josh Silveira: $62,000 (includes $31,000 win bonus) def. Delan Monte: $13,000
- Gabriel Braga: $22,000 (includes $11,000 win bonus) def. Marlon Moraes: $50,000
- Ty Flores: $30,000 (includes $15,000 win bonus) def. Dan Spohn: $20,000
- Chris Wade: $76,000 (includes $38,000 win bonus) def. Ryoji Kudo: $16,000
- Impa Kasanganay: $16,000 (includes $8,000 win bonus) def. Tim Caron: $10,000
- Andrew Sanchez: $36,000 (includes $18,000 win bonus) def. Taylor Johnson: $10,000
- Abigail Montes: $26,000 (includes $13,000 win bonus) def. Brandy Hester: $3,000
- Alexei Pergande: $12,000 (includes $6,000 win bonus) def. Akeem Bashir: $3,000

== See also ==
- List of PFL events
- List of current PFL fighters
