= PFL Europe 2 (2023) =

Professional Fighters League MMA event in 2023

- The poster for PFL Europe 2
- Promotion: Professional Fighters League
- Date: July 8, 2023
- Venue: Verti Music Hall
- City: Berlin, Germany

Event chronology
PFL 6	PFL Europe 2	PFL 7

The PFL Europe 2 mixed martial arts event for the 2023 season of the Professional Fighters League Europe was held on July 8, 2023, at the Verti Music Hall in Berlin, Germany. This was the sophomore event of the PFL Europe league, holding bouts in the Lightweight and Bantamweight divisions.

== Background ==
Starting in 2023 PFL Europe will feature young European MMA fighters, broadcast during prime local hours with all events staged in Europe. The format will follow the same as the regular PFL Season, with the winner receiving a $100,000 prize and a chance to earn a spot in the 2024 PFL regular season.

At weigh-ins, three fighters missed weight, Moktar Benkaci (136.5 lbs) came in half a pound over the limit for his fight against Khurshed Kakhorov, lightweight Acoidan Duque (159.1) clocked in 3.1 pounds over the lightweight cap, and Rachid El Hazoume Aamay was .3 pounds over the bantamweight max at 136.3 pounds.

== Results ==
Main Card (DAZN)
Weight class				Method	Round	Time	Notes
Bantamweight	Francesco Nuzzi	def.	Farbod Iran Nezhad	KO (head kick and punches)	1	1:52	(Note: Bantamweight Quarter-Final)
Bantamweight	Khurshed Kakhorov	def.	Moktar Benkaci	Decision (unanimous) (30–26, 30–26, 30–25)	3	5:00	(Note: Bantamweight Quarter-Final. Benkaci missed weight (136.5 lbs) and had a point deducted.)
Women's Flyweight	Griet Eeckhout	def.	Lorena Cubero	Decision (unanimous) (30–27, 30–27, 30–25)	3	5:00	(Note: Women's Flyweight Quarter-Final)
Bantamweight	Frans Mlambo	def.	Rachid Haz	Decision (majority) (29–27, 29–27, 28–28)	3	5:00	(Note: Bantamweight Quarter-Final. Haz missed weight (136.3 lbs) and had a point deducted.)
Bantamweight	Ali Taleb	def.	Kenji Bortoluzzi	TKO (punches)	1	3:26	(Note: Bantamweight Quarter-Final)
Lightweight	John Mitchell	def.	Geysim Derouiche	Decision (unanimous) (30–27, 30–27, 30–27)	3	5:00	(Note: Lightweight Quarter-Final)
Lightweight	Acoidan Duque	def.	Aleksandr Chizov	Decision (unanimous) (29–28, 29–28, 29–28)	3	5:00	(Note: Lightweight Quarter-Final. Duque missed weight (159.1 lbs) and had a point deducted)
Bantamweight	Lewis McGrillen-Evans	def.	Amrali Saydoshurov	KO (punch)	2	0:12
Lightweight	Dylan Tuke	def.	Connor Hughes	Decision (unanimous) (29–28, 29–28, 29–28)	3	5:00	(Note: Lightweight Quarter-Final)
Lightweight	Jakub Kaszuba	def.	Maxim Radu	Submission (rear-naked choke)	1	3:18	(Note: Lightweight Quarter-Final)
Lightweight	Anatolij Baal	def.	Sebas Santana Guedes	TKO (punches)	2	4:16
Women's Featherweight	Christina Breuer	def.	Ruby Mesu	TKO (punches and knees)	2	3:12

== Brackets ==
=== Lightweight ===
Quarter-finals
(Latvia) Aleksandr Chizov*	DRAW
(Spain) Acoidan Duque	3r.
(Republic of Ireland) John Mitchell	UD
(France) Geysim Derouiche	3r.
(England) Connor Hughes	3r.
(Republic of Ireland) Dylan Tuke	UD
(Italy) Maxim Radu	1r.
(Poland) Jakub Kaszuba	SUB

Semi-finals
(Latvia) Aleksandr Chizov
(Republic of Ireland) John Mitchell
(Republic of Ireland) Dylan Tuke
(Poland) Jakub Kaszuba

Final

- Officially a Unanimous decision victory for Duque, Chizov advanced due to the weight miss by Duque

=== Bantamweight ===
Quarter-finals
(Italy) Francesco Nuzzi	KO
Farbod Iran Nezhad	1r.
(South Africa) Frans Mlambo	MD
(Spain) Rachid Haz	3r.
(France) Moktar Benkaci	3r.
(Tajikistan) Khurshed Kakhorov	UD
(Sweden) Ali Taleb	TKO
(Switzerland) Kenji Bortoluzzi	1r.

Semi-finals
(Italy) Francesco Nuzzi
(South Africa) Frans Mlambo
(Tajikistan) Khurshed Kakhorov
(Sweden) Ali Taleb

Final

=== Women's Flyweight ===
Quarter-finals
(England) Dakota Ditcheva	SUB
(Sweden) Malin Hermansson	1r.
(Poland) Marta Waliczek	3r.
(Sweden) Cornelia Holm	SD
(Germany) Lorena Cubero	3r.
(Belgium) Griet Eeckhout	UD
(Italy) Valentina Scatizzi	SD
(Netherlands) Lizzy Gevers	3r.

Semi-finals
(England) Dakota Ditcheva
(Sweden) Cornelia Holm
(Belgium) Griet Eeckhout
(Italy) Valentina Scatizzi

Final

== See also ==
- List of PFL events
- List of current PFL fighters
