= PFL Europe 3 (2023) =

Mixed martial arts event

- The poster for PFL Europe 3
- Promotion: Professional Fighters League
- Date: September 30, 2023
- Venue: Zénith Paris
- City: Paris, France

Event chronology
PFL 9	PFL Europe 3	PFL 10

PFL Europe 3 was a mixed martial arts event produced by the Professional Fighters League that took place on September 30, 2023, at Zénith Paris in Paris, France.

== Background ==
The event was headlined by a welterweight bout between former two-time Glory Welterweight Champion Cédric Doumbé making his promotional debut against Jordan Zébo.

The card also host the semi-final bouts of PFL Europe's light heavyweight, lightweight, bantamweight and women's flyweight tournaments.

== Results ==
Main card (DAZN)
Weight class				Method	Round	Time	Notes
Welterweight	Cédric Doumbé	def.	Jordan Zébo	KO (punch)	1	0:09
Catchweight (180 lb)	Abdoul Abdouraguimov	def.	Brad Wheeler	Submission (rear-naked choke)	1	2:43
Light Heavyweight	Jakob Nedoh	def.	Anthony Salamone	TKO (punches)	1	1:35	(Note: Light Heavyweight Semi-Final)
Light Heavyweight	Simeon Powell	def.	Daniel Ladero	Decision (unanimous) (30–27, 30–27, 30–27)	3	5:00	(Note: Light Heavyweight Semi-Final)
Women's Flyweight	Dakota Ditcheva	def.	Cornelia Holm	KO (punch to the body)	3	2:55	(Note: Women's Flyweight Semi-Final)
Lightweight	Yazid Chouchane	def.	Henrique Madureira	Decision (unanimous) (30–27, 30–27, 30–27)	3	5:00
Catchweight (180 lb)	Laureano Staropoli	def.	Baba Boundjou Nadjombe	TKO (corner stoppage)	2	5:00
Bantamweight	Khurshed Kakhorov	def.	Ali Taleb	Decision (unanimous) (29–28, 29–27, 29–27)	3	5:00	(Note: Bantamweight Semi-Final)
Preliminary card (YouTube / DAZN)
Bantamweight	Frans Mlambo	def.	Moktar Benkaci	Decision (split) (29–28, 28–29, 29–28)	3	5:00	(Note: Bantamweight Semi-Final)
Lightweight	Jakub Kaszuba	def.	Dylan Tuke	Decision (unanimous) (29–28, 29–28, 30–27)	3	5:00	(Note: Lightweight Semi-Final)
Lightweight	John Mitchell	def.	Geysim Derouiche	Decision (unanimous) (30–27, 30–27, 30–27)	3	5:00	(Note: Lightweight Semi-Final)
Women's Flyweight	Shanelle Dyer	def.	Luisa Fernanda Cifuentes	Decision (unanimous) (30–27, 30–27, 30–27)	3	5:00

== Brackets ==
=== Light Heavyweight ===
Quarter-finals
(Netherlands) Mohamed Amine	2r.
(England) Simeón Powell	SUB
(Spain) Abdellah Er-Ramy	TKO
(Romania) Mădălin Pîrvulescu	1r.
(Italy) Riccardo Nosiglia	1r.
(Slovenia) Jakob Nedoh	KO
(France) Anthony Salamone	TKO
(Spain) Daniel Ladero	1r.

Semi-finals
(England) Simeón Powell	UD
(Spain) Daniel Ladero (Note: Er-Ramy wasn not medically cleared and was replaced by Daniel Ladero)	3r.
(Slovenia) Jakob Nedoh	TKO
(France) Anthony Salamone	1r.

Final
(England) Simeón Powell
(Slovenia) Jakob Nedoh

=== Lightweight ===
Quarter-finals
(Latvia) Aleksandr Chizov (Note: Officially a Unanimous decision victory for Duque, Chizov advanced due to the weight miss by Duque)	DRAW
(Spain) Acoidan Duque	3r.
(Republic of Ireland) John Mitchell	UD
(France) Geysim Derouiche	3r.
(England) Connor Hughes	3r.
(Republic of Ireland) Dylan Tuke	UD
(Italy) Maxim Radu	1r.
(Poland) Jakub Kaszuba	SUB

Semi-finals
(France) Geysim Derouiche (Note: Chizov missed weight and was replaced by Geysim Derouiche)	3r.
(Republic of Ireland) John Mitchell	UD
(Republic of Ireland) Dylan Tuke	3r.
(Poland) Jakub Kaszuba	UD

Final
(Republic of Ireland) John Mitchell
(Poland) Jakub Kaszuba

=== Bantamweight ===
Quarter-finals
(Italy) Francesco Nuzzi	KO
Farbod Iran Nezhad	1r.
(South Africa) Frans Mlambo	MD
(Spain) Rachid Haz	3r.
(France) Moktar Benkaci	3r.
(Tajikistan) Khurshed Kakhorov	UD
(Sweden) Ali Taleb	TKO
(Switzerland) Kenji Bortoluzzi	1r.

Semi-finals
(France) Moktar Benkaci (Note: Francesco Nuzzi pulled out of the bout and was replaced by Moktar Benkaci)	3r.
(South Africa) Frans Mlambo	SD
(Tajikistan) Khurshed Kakhorov	UD
(Sweden) Ali Taleb	3r.

Final
(South Africa) Frans Mlambo
(Tajikistan) Khurshed Kakhorov

=== Women's Flyweight ===
Quarter-finals
(England) Dakota Ditcheva	SUB
(Sweden) Malin Hermansson	1r.
(Poland) Marta Waliczek	3r.
(Sweden) Cornelia Holm	SD
(Germany) Lorena Cubero	3r.
(Belgium) Griet Eeckhout	UD
(Italy) Valentina Scatizzi	SD
(Netherlands) Lizzy Gevers	3r.

Semi-finals
(England) Dakota Ditcheva	KO
(Sweden) Cornelia Holm	3r.
(Italy) Manuela Marconetto (Note: Griet Eeckhout pulled out of the bout and was replaced by Manuela Marconetto)	—
(Italy) Valentina Scatizzi	BYE (Note: Marconetto missed weight and Scatizzi therefore got a bye to the finals)

Final
(England) Dakota Ditcheva
(Italy) Valentina Scatizzi

== See also ==
- List of PFL events
- List of current PFL fighters
