= PFL Europe 1 (2023) =

Professional Fighters League MMA event in 2023

- The poster for PFL Europe 1
- Promotion: Professional Fighters League
- Date: March 25, 2023
- Venue: Vertu Motors Arena
- City: Newcastle, England

Event chronology
PFL 10	PFL Europe 1	PFL 1

The PFL Europe 1 mixed martial arts event for the 2023 season of the Professional Fighters League Europe was held on March 25, 2023, at the Vertu Motors Arena in Newcastle, England. This was the inaugural event of the PFL Europe league, holding bouts in the Light Heavyweight and Women's Flyweight

== Background ==
Starting in 2023 PFL Europe will feature young European MMA fighters, broadcast during prime local hours with all events staged in Europe. The format will follow the same as the regular PFL Season, with the winner receiving a $100,000 prize and a chance to earn a spot in the 2024 PFL regular season.

At weigh-ins, Mafalda Carmona, who was supposed to fight Griet Eeckhout in the flyweight category, weighed in at 131.2 pounds, which was 5.2 pounds over the limit. Consequently, the fight was called off. Lewis Monarch weighed in at 157 pounds for his lightweight showcase bout against Ownsworth, exceeding the 156-pound limit by one pound. However, the bout went ahead with Monarch being penalized a certain percentage of his earnings.

== Results ==
Main Card (DAZN)
Weight class				Method	Round	Time	Notes
Light Heavyweight	Simeón Powell	def.	Mohamed Amine	Technical Submission (arm-triangle choke)	2	5:00	(Note: Light Heavyweight Quarter-Final)
Women's Flyweight	Dakota Ditcheva	def.	Malin Hermansson	Submission (rear-naked choke)	1	3:52	(Note: Women's Flyweight Quarter-Final)
Bantamweight	Lewis McGrillen-Evans	def.	Salih Kulucan	KO (punch)	1	2:33
Light Heavyweight	Jakob Nedoh	def.	Riccardo Nosiglia	KO (punches)	1	0:48	(Note: Light Heavyweight Quarter-Final)
Light Heavyweight	Anthony Salamone	def.	Daniel Ladero	TKO (punches)	1	2:19	(Note: Light Heavyweight Quarter-Final)
Women's Flyweight	Cornelia Holm	def.	Marta Waliczek	Decision (split) (29–28, 28–29, 29–28)	3	5:00	(Note: Women's Flyweight Quarter-Final)
Light Heavyweight	Abdellah Er-Ramy	def.	Mădălin Pîrvulescu	TKO (punches)	1	2:18	(Note: Light Heavyweight Quarter-Final)
Women's Flyweight	Valentina Scatizzi	def.	Lizzy Gevers	Decision (split) (30–27, 29–28, 28–29)	3	5:00	(Note: Women's Flyweight Quarter-Final)
Preliminary card (DAZN)
Bantamweight	Louis Lee Scott	def.	Sam Robinson	TKO (punches and head kick)	1	0:21
Lightweight	Oscar Ownsworth	def.	Lewis Monarch	Decision (split) (29–28, 29–28, 28–29)	3	5:00	(Note: Monarch missed weight (157 lb))

== Brackets ==
=== Light Heavyweight ===
Quarter-finals
(Netherlands) Mohamed Amine	2r.
(England) Simeón Powell	SUB
(Spain) Abdellah Er-Ramy	TKO
(Romania) Mădălin Pîrvulescu	1r.
(Italy) Riccardo Nosiglia	1r.
(Slovenia) Jakob Nedoh	KO
(France) Anthony Salamone	TKO
(Spain) Daniel Ladero	1r.

Semi-finals
(England) Simeón Powell
(Spain) Abdellah Er-Ramy
(Slovenia) Jakob Nedoh
(France) Anthony Salamone

Final

=== Women's Flyweight ===
Quarter-finals
(Italy) Valentina Scatizzi	SD
(Netherlands) Lizzy Gevers	3r.
(Poland) Marta Waliczek	3r.
(Sweden) Cornelia Holm	SD
(England) Dakota Ditcheva	SUB
(Sweden) Malin Hermansson	1r.
(Portugal) Mafalda Carmona
(Belgium) Griet Eeckhout

Semi-finals
(Italy) Valentina Scatizzi
(Sweden) Cornelia Holm
(England) Dakota Ditcheva

Final

== See also ==
- List of PFL events
- List of current PFL fighters
