= The Anthem (music venue) =

Music venue in Washington, D.C.

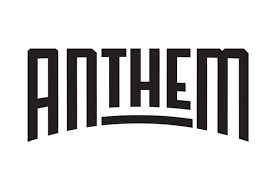

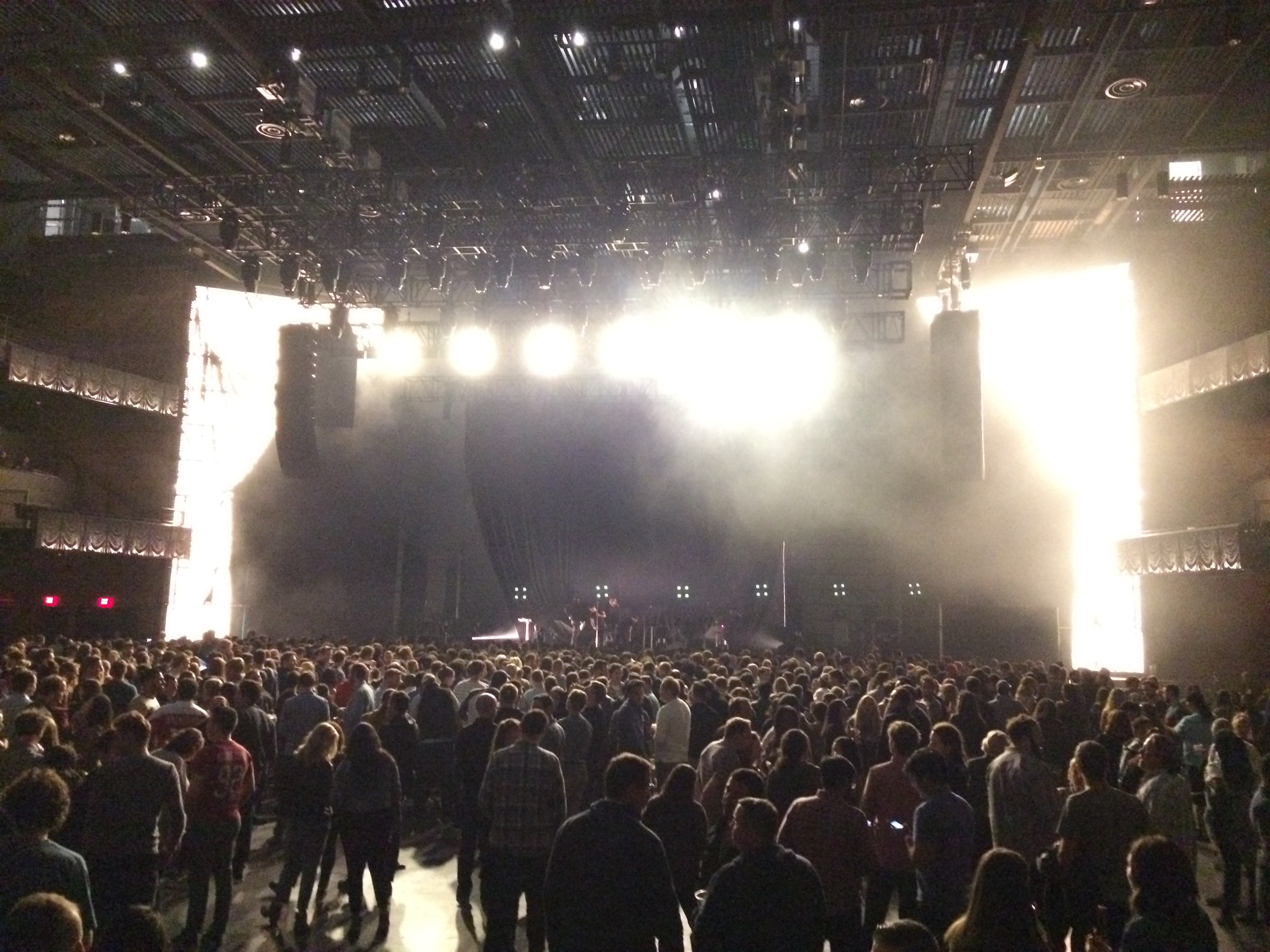
- The Anthem stage on October 16, 2017, before Phoenix's performance.
- Interactive map of The Anthem
- Address: 901 Wharf Street SW; Washington, D.C. 20024; United States
- Coordinates: 38.8801°N 77.0260°W
- Seating type: GA: Standing Room and Reserved Balcony Seating or Full Theatre Seating
- Capacity: 2,500–6,000 (variable) / Fully seated 2,300–3,200
- Type: Music venue, auditorium
- Events: Entertainment, convention center
- Public transit: Washington Metro at Waterfront at L'Enfant Plaza

Construction
- Opened: October 12, 2017; 8 years ago
- Cost: $60 million (US)

Website
- theanthemdc.com

The Anthem is a music venue and auditorium in the Southwest Waterfront neighborhood of Washington, D.C. The venue opened on October 12, 2017, with a performance opened by The Struts and headlined by the Foo Fighters. The Anthem is part of The Wharf, a comprehensive redevelopment of the Southwest Waterfront area.

The 57,000-square-foot venue, which cost $60 million (USD), has a movable stage and backdrop that allows capacity to vary from 2,500 to 6,000. Balconies are closer to the stage than most venues. The venue is operated by I.M.P., which also manages Washington's 9:30 Club and Lincoln Theatre and Maryland's Merriweather Post Pavilion. The Anthem also hosts conventions. The Anthem serves as the home venue to the DC Flight, a professional women's volleyball team competing in Major League Volleyball.

== Concerts ==
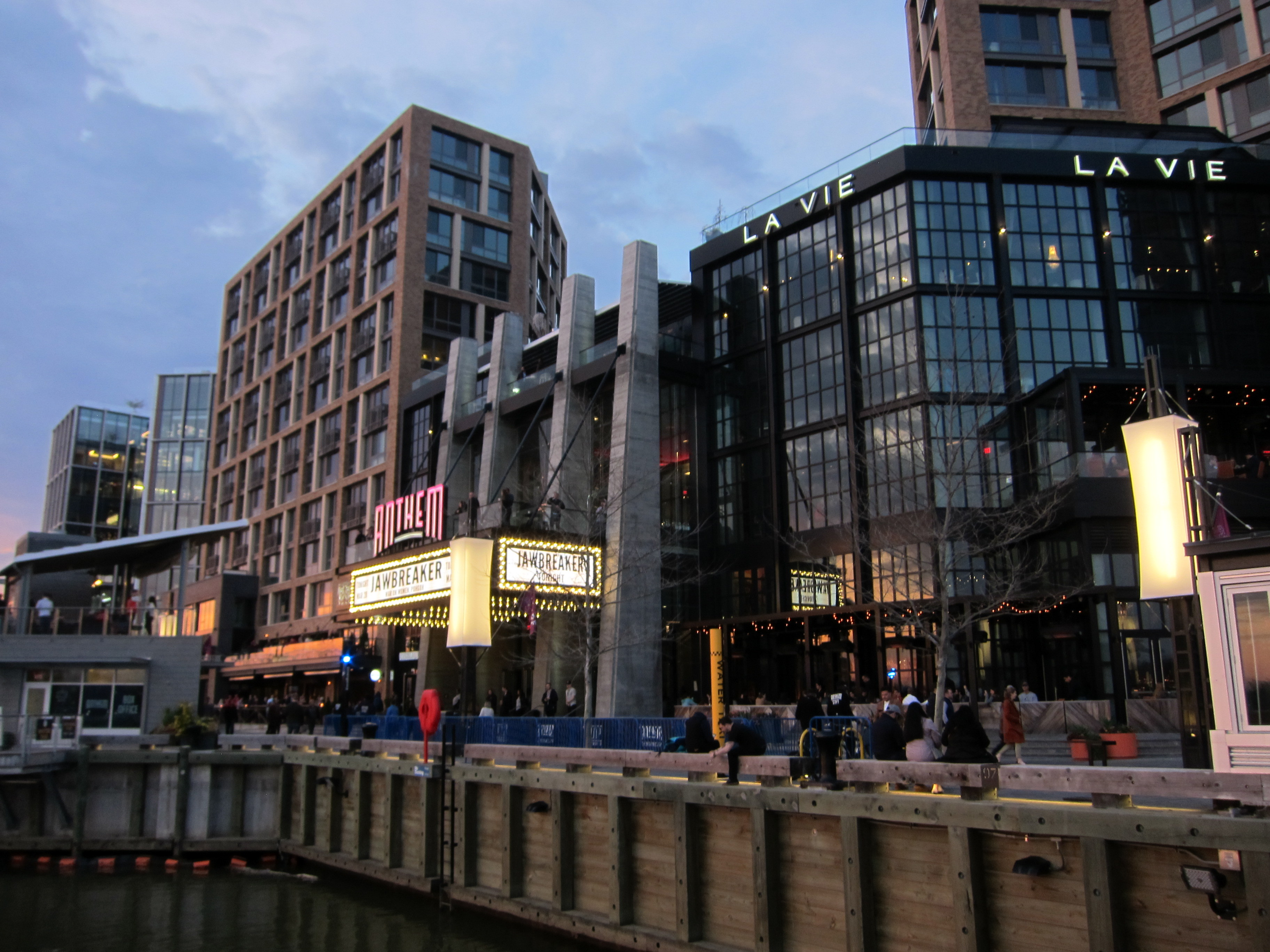
The Anthem is located along the riverfront of the Wharf in Southwest D.C.

In its first few months of operation, the venue hosted musical acts including AJR, Lorde, Meek Mill, The National, The War on Drugs, Greensky Bluegrass, GRiZ, Phoenix, Courtney Barnett & Kurt Vile, The Killers, Tegan and Sara, Erykah Badu, Bob Dylan, Judas Priest, Noel Gallagher, Queens of the Stone Age, David Byrne, LCD Soundsystem, Pentatonix, Fantasia Barrino, Thievery Corporation, Phil Lesh, Little Big Town, and Kraftwerk.

Jack White filmed Jack White: Kneeling At The Anthem D.C., his first concert film as a solo artist, at The Anthem on May 30, 2018. It was released exclusively on Amazon Prime Video on September 21, 2018, with an accompanying live EP on Amazon Music.
