= 2021 in Professional Fighters League =

- Genre: Sports
- Country of origin: United States

Original release
- Network: ESPN
- Release: April 23, 2021

This is a list of events and standings for the Professional Fighters League, a mixed martial arts organization based in the United States, for the 2021 season.

PFL's 2021 roster included 60 fighters competing across six weight classes. The late additions to the season were the welterweights Gleison Tibau, Alexey Kunchenko and Jason Ponet, featherweights Chris Wade and Anthony Dizy, women’s lightweights Kaitlin Young and Taylor Guardado and light heavyweight Nick Roehrick.

== 2021 world champions ==
Division	Upper weight limit	Champion	Date
Heavyweight	265 lb (120 kg; 18.9 st)	Bruno Cappelozza	October 27, 2021 (PFL 10)
Light Heavyweight	205 lb (93 kg; 14.6 st)	Antônio Carlos Júnior	October 27, 2021 (PFL 10)
Welterweight	170 lb (77 kg; 12 st)	Ray Cooper III	October 27, 2021 (PFL 10)
Lightweight	155 lb (70 kg; 11.1 st)	Raush Manfio	October 27, 2021 (PFL 10)
Women's Lightweight	155 lb (70 kg; 11.1 st)	Kayla Harrison	October 27, 2021 (PFL 10)
Featherweight	145 lb (66 kg; 10.5 st)	Movlid Khaybulaev	October 27, 2021 (PFL 10)

== Rule Changes ==
A fighter who is overweight on the scale at weigh-ins will be deducted one point in the standings in the PFL's season structure. In previous seasons, a fighter who missed weight could not earn any points even in a victory, but no standings points were actually taken away until now.

In 2021, the top four fighters per division after the regular season will make the playoffs, a number down from the eight who made the playoffs in men's divisions in previous seasons. The women's lightweight division will have the top four make the playoffs the way it did in 2019, the PFL's most recent season. The four athletes making the playoffs will advance directly to the semifinals in each division. There will be no quarterfinals, nor a situation where a fighter must win twice in a single night.

== Events ==
The first event of the 2021 PFL season will kick off on April 23, 2021. The prelims were broadcast on ESPN+, while the main card was broadcast on ESPN2. All of the regular season events were held in the Atlantic City, New Jersey, at the Ocean Casino Resort in a “bubble environment”. All fighters will undergo a 17-day quarantine period, as a precaution for COVID-19.

The trio of events constituting the season playoffs will be held at the Seminole Hard Rock Hotel & Casino Hollywood in Hollywood, Florida.

#	Event	Date	Venue	Location
10	PFL 10	October 27, 2021	Seminole Hard Rock Hotel & Casino Hollywood	Hollywood, Florida, United States
9	PFL 9	August 27, 2021	Seminole Hard Rock Hotel & Casino Hollywood	Hollywood, Florida, United States
8	PFL 8	August 19, 2021	Seminole Hard Rock Hotel & Casino Hollywood	Hollywood, Florida, United States
7	PFL 7	August 13, 2021	Seminole Hard Rock Hotel & Casino Hollywood	Hollywood, Florida, United States
6	PFL 6	June 25, 2021	Ocean Casino Resort	Atlantic City, New Jersey, United States
5	PFL 5	June 17, 2021	Ocean Casino Resort	Atlantic City, New Jersey, United States
4	PFL 4	June 10, 2021	Ocean Casino Resort	Atlantic City, New Jersey, United States
3	PFL 3	May 6, 2021	Ocean Casino Resort	Atlantic City, New Jersey, United States
2	PFL 2	April 29, 2021	Ocean Casino Resort	Atlantic City, New Jersey, United States
1	PFL 1	April 23, 2021	Ocean Casino Resort	Atlantic City, New Jersey, United States

== 2021 PFL Heavyweight playoffs ==
Semifinals
1	(Brazil) Bruno Cappelozza	TKO
4	(United States) Jamelle Jones	2
2	(Russia) Denis Goltsov	3
3	(Croatia) Ante Delija	UD

Finals
1	(Brazil) Bruno Cappelozza	UD
3	(Croatia) Ante Delija	5

Legend
(SD)	(Split Decision)
(UD)	(Unanimous Decision)
(MD)	(Majority Decision)
SUB	Submission
(T)KO	(Technical) Knock Out
L	Loss

== 2021 PFL Light Heavyweight playoffs ==
Semifinals
1	(Brazil) Antônio Carlos Júnior	UD
4	(Argentina) Emiliano Sordi	3
2	(Brazil) Cezar Ferreira	1
3	(Norway) Marthin Hamlet	TKO

Finals
1	(Brazil) Antônio Carlos Júnior	SUB
3	(Norway) Marthin Hamlet	1

Legend
(SD)	(Split Decision)
(UD)	(Unanimous Decision)
(MD)	(Majority Decision)
SUB	Submission
(T)KO	(Technical) Knock Out
L	Loss

== 2021 PFL Welterweight playoffs ==
Semifinals
5	(Sweden) Sadibou Sy*	3
4	(Russia) Magomed Magomedkerimov	UD
2	(Canada) Rory MacDonald	3
3	(United States) Ray Cooper III	UD

Finals
4	(Russia) Magomed Magomedkerimov	3
3	(United States) Ray Cooper III	KO

- João Zeferino was originally scheduled to face Magomed Magomedkerimov but was unable to continue in the tournament. He was replaced by #5 ranked Sadibou Sy.

Legend
(SD)	(Split Decision)
(UD)	(Unanimous Decision)
(MD)	(Majority Decision)
SUB	Submission
(T)KO	(Technical) Knock Out
L	Loss

== 2021 PFL Lightweight playoffs ==
Semifinals
1	(Tajikistan) Loik Radzhabov	UD
4	(Paraguay) Alexander Martinez	3
2	(United States) Clay Collard	3
3	(Brazil) Raush Manfio	UD

Finals
1	(Tajikistan) Loik Radzhabov	5
3	(Brazil) Raush Manfio	UD

Legend
(SD)	(Split Decision)
(UD)	(Unanimous Decision)
(MD)	(Majority Decision)
SUB	Submission
(T)KO	(Technical) Knock Out
L	Loss

== 2021 PFL Featherweight playoffs ==
Semifinals
1	(England) Brendan Loughnane	3
4	(Russia) Movlid Khaybulaev	SD
2	(United States) Chris Wade	UD
3	(United States) Bubba Jenkins	3

Finals
4	(Russia) Movlid Khaybulaev	UD
2	(United States) Chris Wade	5

Legend
(SD)	(Split Decision)
(UD)	(Unanimous Decision)
(MD)	(Majority Decision)
SUB	Submission
(T)KO	(Technical) Knock Out
L	Loss

== 2021 PFL Women's Lightweight playoffs ==
Semifinals
5	(Brazil) Mariana Morais	3
4	(United States) Taylor Guardado	SD
2	(United States) Kayla Harrison	TKO
3	(New Zealand) Genah Fabian	1

Finals
4	(United States) Taylor Guardado	2
2	(United States) Kayla Harrison	SUB

* Larissa Pacheco was originally scheduled to face Taylor Guardado but was unable to continue in the tournament. She was replaced by #5 ranked Mariana Morais.

Legend
(SD)	(Split Decision)
(UD)	(Unanimous Decision)
(MD)	(Majority Decision)
SUB	Submission
(T)KO	(Technical) Knock Out
L	Loss

== Standings ==
The PFL points system is based on results of the match. The winner of a fight receives 3 points. If the fight ends in a draw, both fighters will receive 1 point. A no-contest will be scored as a draw. The bonus for winning a fight in the first, second, or third round is 3 points, 2 points, and 1 point respectively. The bonus for winning in the third round requires a fight be stopped before 4:59 of the third round. No bonus point will be awarded if a fighter wins via decision. For example, if a fighter wins a fight in the first round, then the fighter will receive 6 total points. A decision win will result in three total points. If a fighter misses weight, the opponent (should they comply with weight limits) will receive 3 points due to a walkover victory, regardless of winning or losing the bout, with the fighter who missed weight being deducted 1 standings point; if the non-offending fighter subsequently wins with a stoppage, all bonus points will be awarded. A fighter who was unable to compete for any reason, will receive a 1-point penalty (-1 point in the standings). The fighters who made weight will not receive a walkover, but will earn points and contracted purse amounts based on their performance in the altered matchup.

=== Heavyweight ===
The heavyweight roster included the current PFL Heavyweight champion Ali Isaev, the former UFC Heavyweight champion Fabricio Werdum, the former Jungle Fight champion Bruno Cappelozza, former ACB champion Denis Goltsov, M-1 Global title challenger Ante Delija, UFC veteran Justin Willis, Renan Ferreira, Hatef Moeil, Brandon Sayles and Mohammed Usman.

Fighter	Wins	Draws	Losses	NCs	1st	2nd	3rd	Total Points (Note: The four fighters with most points advance to the playoffs)
♛ (Brazil) Bruno Cappelozza	2	0	0	0	2	0	0	12
♛ (Russia) Denis Goltsov	2	0	0	0	1	0	1	10
♛ (Croatia) Ante Delija	1	0	1	0	1	0	0	6
♛ (United States) Jamelle Jones	1	0	0	0	1	0	0	6
E (United States) Brandon Sayles	1	0	1	0	0	1	0	5
E (Brazil) Renan Ferreira	1	0	0	0	0	0	0	4
E (Brazil) Fabricio Werdum	0	0	0	1	0	0	0	1
E (United States) Muhammed DeReese	0	0	2	0	0	0	0	0
E (Brazil) Klidson Abreu	0	0	1	0	0	0	0	0
E (Samoa) Carl Seumanutafa	0	0	1	0	0	0	0	0
E (United States) Chandler Cole	0	0	1	0	0	0	0	0
E (Nigeria) Mohammed Usman	0	0	1	0	0	0	0	0

=== Light Heavyweight ===
The first nine light heavyweights announced for the 2021 season were the 2019 PFL champion Emiliano Sordi, the former UFC and Glory fighter Chris Camozzi, UFC veterans Cezar Ferreira, Jordan Johnson, Daniel Spohn and Tom Lawlor, Marthin Hamlet, Smealinho Rama and Jordan Young. Nick Roehrick was later added to the roster, while the former UFC middleweight Antônio Carlos Júnior joined the roster on March 6, 2021. PFL announced that Antônio Carlos Júnior will replace Jordan Johnson for the whole season. At the beginning of April, Smealinho Rama was replaced by Vinny Magalhães for the whole season. At weigh-ins of PFL 2, Vinny had to be taken to the hospital due to complications of his weight cut and was replaced by Askar Mozharov.

Fighter	Wins	Draws	Losses	1st	2nd	3rd	Total Points (Note: The four fighters with most points advance to the playoffs)
♛ (Brazil) Antônio Carlos Júnior	1	0	0	1	0	0	7
♛ (Brazil) Cezar Ferreira	1	0	1	1	0	0	6
♛ (Norway) Marthin Hamlet	1	0	1	0	1	0	5
♛ (Argentina) Emiliano Sordi	1	1	0	0	0	0	4
E (United States) Cory Hendricks	1	0	0	0	0	1	4
E (United States) Chris Camozzi	1	0	1	0	0	0	3
E (United States) Jordan Young	1	0	1	0	0	0	3
E (United States) Tom Lawlor	1	0	1	0	0	0	3
E (United States) Dan Spohn	0	1	1	0	0	0	1
E (Brazil) Vinny Magalhães	0	0	1	0	0	0	0

=== Welterweight ===
The first seven welterweights announced for the 2021 season were the 2019 PFL champion Ray Cooper III, former Bellator champion Rory MacDonald, PFL veteran Magomed Magomedkerimov, UFC veterans David Michaud and João Zeferino, Nikolai Aleksakhin and Sadibou Sy. Alexey Kunchenko was additionally announced for the 2021 season. Jason Ponet and former UFC Lightweight Gleison Tibau were later added on. After revealing a heart condition, David Michaud had to back out of the season and was replaced by Curtis Millender.

Sy replaced Zeferino because of an injury before the PFL semifinals.

Fighter	Wins	Draws	Losses	1st	2nd	3rd	Total Points (Note: The four fighters with most points advance to the playoffs)
E (Brazil) João Zeferino	2	0	0	0	1	0	8
♛ (Canada) Rory MacDonald	1	0	1	1	0	0	6
♛ (United States) Ray Cooper III	2	0	0	1	0	0	5
♛ (Russia) Magomed Magomedkerimov	1	0	0	1	0	0	5
♛ (Sweden) Sadibou Sy	1	0	0	0	0	0	4
E (Russia) Nikolay Aleksakhin	0	0	1	0	0	0	4
E (Brazil) Gleison Tibau	1	0	1	0	0	0	3
E (France) Jason Ponet	0	0	2	0	0	0	0
E (United States) Curtis Millender	0	0	2	0	0	0	0
E (Russia) Alexey Kunchenko	0	0	1	0	0	0	-1

=== Lightweight ===
The 2021 Lightweight roster included the two-time PFL Lightweight champion Natan Schulte, former UFC Lightweight champion Anthony Pettis, UFC veterans Olivier Aubin-Mercier, Clay Collard, Marcin Held and Johnny Case, as well as Akhmed Aliev, Joilton Lutterbach, Mikhail Odintsov and Loik Radzhabov. On April 7, 2021, Alexander Martinez replaced Johnny Case in the lightweight roster, after Case was charged with domestic battery.

Round 1 (PFL 1)
Weight class				Method	Round	Time	Notes
Lightweight	Alexander Martinez	def.	Loik Radzhabov	Decision (split) (29-28, 28-29, 30-27)	3	5:00
Lightweight	Akhmet Aliev	def.	Mikhail Odintsov	Decision (unanimous) (29-28, 29-28, 29-28)	3	5:00
Lightweight	Raush Manfio	def.	Joilton Lutterbach	Decision (split) (28-29, 29-28, 29-28)	3	5:00
Lightweight	Marcin Held	def.	Natan Schulte	Decision (unanimous) (29-28, 29-28, 29-28)	3	5:00
Lightweight	Clay Collard	def.	Anthony Pettis	Decision (unanimous) (29-27, 29-27, 29-28)	3	5:00
Round 2 (PFL 4 & PFL 6)
Lightweight	Loik Radzhabov	def.	Akhmet Aliev	TKO (punches)	1	0:27
Lightweight	Olivier Aubin-Mercier	def.	Marcin Held	Decision (unanimous) (30-27, 30-27, 30-27)	3	5:00
Lightweight	Natan Schulte	def.	Alexander Martinez	Decision (split) (28-29, 29-28, 29-28)	3	5:00
Lightweight	Clay Collard	def.	Joilton Lutterbach	Decision (split) (29-28, 28-29, 29-28)	3	5:00
Lightweight	Raush Manfio	def.	Anthony Pettis	Decision (split) (28-29, 29-28, 29-28)	3	5:00
Semifinals (PFL 7)
Lightweight	Loik Radzhabov	def.	Alexander Martinez	Decision (unanimous) (30-27, 30-27, 29-28)	3	5:00
Lightweight	Raush Manfio	def.	Clay Collard	Decision (unanimous) (29-28, 29-28, 29-28)	3	5:00
Final (PFL 10)
Lightweight	Raush Manfio	def.	Loik Radzhabov	Decision (unanimous) (48-46, 48-46, 49-46)	5	5:00	(Note: For the 2021 PFL Lightweight Championship.)
Non-tournament bouts
Lightweight	Christian Lohsen	def.	Jonas Flok	Decision (unanimous) (29-28, 29-28, 29-28)	3	5:00
Lightweight	Brandon Jenkins	def.	Jacob Kilburn	KO (flying knee)	1	2:56
Lightweight	Don Madge	def.	Nathan Williams	Submission (rear-naked choke)	2	2:15

Fighter	Wins	Draws	Losses	1st	2nd	3rd	Total Points (Note: The four fighters with most points advance to the playoffs)
♛ (Tajikistan) Loik Radzhabov	1	0	1	1	0	0	6
♛ (United States) Clay Collard	2	0	0	0	0	0	6
♛ (Brazil) Raush Manfio	2	0	0	0	0	0	6
♛ (Paraguay) Alexander Martinez	1	0	1	0	0	0	3
E (Brazil) Natan Schulte	1	0	1	0	0	0	3
E (Poland) Marcin Held	1	0	1	0	0	0	3
E (Russia) Akhmet Aliev	1	0	1	0	0	0	3
E (Canada) Olivier Aubin-Mercier	1	0	0	0	0	0	2
E (United States) Anthony Pettis	0	0	2	0	0	0	0
E (Brazil) Joilton Lutterbach	0	0	2	0	0	0	-1

=== Women's Lightweight ===
The women's 2021 roster included the 2019 PFL champion Kayla Harrison, Cindy Dandois, Genah Fabian, Olena Kolesnyk, Mariana Morais, Larissa Pacheco, Julija Pajic and Laura Sanchez. Kaitlin Young and Taylor Guardado rounded out the roster.

Pacheco was eliminated at the semifinals when she was two pounds over the lightweight limit.

Fighter	Wins	Draws	Losses	1st	2nd	3rd	Total Points (Note: The four fighters with most points advance to the playoffs)
E (Brazil) Larissa Pacheco	2	0	0	2	0	0	12
♛ (United States) Kayla Harrison	2	0	0	2	0	0	12
♛ (New Zealand) Genah Fabian	1	0	0	0	1	0	8
♛ (United States) Taylor Guardado	2	0	0	0	0	0	6
♛ (Brazil) Mariana Morais	1	0	1	0	0	0	3
E (United States) Kaitlin Young	1	0	1	0	0	0	3
E (Belgium) Cindy Dandois	0	0	2	0	0	0	0
E (United States) Laura Sanchez	0	0	2	0	0	0	0
E (Montenegro) Julija Pajić	0	0	2	0	0	0	0
E (Ukraine) Olena Kolesnyk	0	0	2	0	0	0	-1

=== Featherweight ===
Eight fighters were initially announced for the 2021 season. The two-time PFL champion Lance Palmer, UFC veteran Sheymon Moraes, Bellator veteran Bubba Jenkins, Tyler Diamond, Sung Bin Jo, Movlid Khaybulaev, Brendan Loughnane and Jason Soares. Chris Wade, who previously competed in the PFL Lightweight division, was added to the featherweight roster. Anthony Dizy was later added as well. Jason Soares was not medically cleared, hence he was replaced by Lazar Stojadinovic.

Fighter	Wins	Draws	Losses	1st	2nd	3rd	Total Points (Note: The four fighters with most points advance to the playoffs)
♛ (England) Brendan Loughnane	2	0	0	1	0	0	9
♛ (United States) Chris Wade	2	0	0	0	1	0	8
♛ (United States) Bubba Jenkins	2	0	0	0	0	0	6
♛ (Russia) Movlid Khaybulaev	2	0	0	0	0	0	6
E (Brazil) Sheymon Moraes	1	0	1	0	1	0	5
E (United States) Tyler Diamond	1	0	1	0	0	0	3
E (United States) Lance Palmer	0	0	2	0	0	0	0
E (United States) Bobby Moffett	0	0	1	0	0	0	0
E (Russia) Arman Ospanov	0	0	1	0	0	0	0
E (United States) Jesse Stirn	0	0	1	0	0	0	-1

♛ = Clinched playoff spot --- E = Eliminated

== See also ==
- List of PFL events
- List of current PFL fighters
- 2021 in UFC
- 2021 in Bellator MMA
- 2021 in ONE Championship
- 2021 in Absolute Championship Akhmat
- 2021 in Rizin Fighting Federation
- 2021 in Legacy Fighting Alliance
