= Genah Fabian =

New Zealand kickboxer

- Born: September 5, 1989 (age 37); Auckland, New Zealand
- Nationality: New Zealand
- Height: 6 ft 0 in (1.83 m)
- Weight: 155 lb (70 kg; 11.1 st)
- Division: Featherweight
- Reach: 74 in (188 cm)
- Style: Muay Thai
- Fighting out of: Auckland, New Zealand
- Team: City Kickboxing

Professional boxing record
- Total: 2
- Wins: 0
- Losses: 0
- Draws: 1
- No contests: 1

Kickboxing record
- Total: 9
- Wins: 7
- Losses: 2

Mixed martial arts record
- Total: 9
- Wins: 5
- By knockout: 3
- By decision: 2
- Losses: 4
- By knockout: 3
- By decision: 1

Other information
- Notable relatives: Eugene Bareman (cousin)
- Boxing record from BoxRec
- Mixed martial arts record from Sherdog

Genah Fabian (born September 5, 1989) is a New Zealand Combat Sports athlete competing in Muay Thai, Kickboxing, MMA and Boxing.

== Background ==
Fabian spent her early years living with her mother in West Auckland, before moving to Central Auckland to attend Auckland Girls Grammar in 2001.

Fabian’s mother is of Samoan and German descent, while her father is Māori, from Tainui."

As a youth, Fabian found early success on the athletics track qualifying for the junior Olympics as well as becoming a competitive rower when she lived in Australia. At 19, she moved to Sydney and was working at media organization News Limited, after finishing up in a sales and marketing role at Fairfax in New Zealand.

In 2011, Fabian was involved in a serious car accident which left her home bound for about three months in Sydney. After becoming depressed due to being home bound, a friend told her about going to a muay thai training camp in Thailand. There she fell in love with the sport and relocated to Thailand. Fabian's greatest achievement in sports so far is winning the WMC middleweight title.

She is a cousin of City Kickboxing head coach Eugene Bareman.

== Mixed martial arts career ==
=== Professional Fighters League ===
==== 2019 season ====
After picking up a win on the regional Australian scene in 2015, Fabian returned to MMA for the 2019 Professional Fighters League season. In her first bout, she faced Bobbi Jo Dalziel at PFL 1 on May 9, 2019. She lost the bout via unanimous decision.

Fabian faced Moriel Charneski on July 11, 2019, at PFL 4. She won the bout in the first round by dropping Moriel and finishing her on the ground.

Fabian was scheduled to face Kayla Harrison at PFL 7 on October 11, 2019, but Fabian was forced to pull out of the bout due to illness and issues with her weight cut.

==== 2021 season ====
Fabian made her return against Laura Sanchez at PFL 3 on May 6, 2021. She won the bout via unanimous decision.

Fabian faced Julija Pajić on June 25, 2021, at PFL 6. She won the bout in the second round after dropping Pajić with a head kick and then finishing her with punches.

Fabian faced Kayla Harrison in the Semifinals off the Women's Lightweight tournament on August 19, 2021, at PFL 8. She lost the fight via TKO in the first round.

==== 2022 season ====
Fabian faced Julia Budd on May 6, 2022 at PFL 3. At weigh-ins, Fabian missed weight for the bout, officially weighing in at 160.8 pounds, 4.8 pounds over the lightweight non-title fight limit. She was fined 20 percent of her purse, and was rendered ineligible to win playoff points. She was given a walkover loss, and was penalized one point in the PFL standings. Budd received a walkover win regardless of bout outcome. Despite this, Fabian won the bout on the scorecards of all three judges, improving her professional record to 5-2, despite officially losing the bout under the structure of the PFL.

Fabian faced Larissa Pacheco on July 1, 2022 at PFL 6. She lost the bout via TKO stoppage in the first round.

== Professional boxing fights ==
In March 2021, Fabian made her professional boxing debut against Ariane Nicholson. Due to an accidental headbutt, Nicholson received a bad cut which forced the referee to stop the fight, ending in a no contest. Fabian would have her second professional boxing fight on 14 September 2024 when she fought Trish Vaka on a David Nyika undercard. The fight would end in a Majority Decision Draw.

== Kickboxing record (Incomplete) ==
Kickboxing record (Incomplete)
7 wins (4 KOs), 2 losses, 0 draws
Date	Result	Opponent	Event	Location	Method	Round	Time	Record
2018-02-27	Win	(Canada) Charmaine Tweet		Oakland, United States	KO	2		
Wins the WMC World Middleweight (−66.0 kg/145 lb) Full Contact Championship.
2016-02-12	Win	(Australia) Stephanie Glew		Perth, Australia	Decision	5	3:00	
Wins the ISKA Australia Super Welterweight (−70.0 kg/154 lb) Muay Thai Championship.
2015-06-11	Loss	(Australia) Carleigh Crawford		Phuket, Thailand	Decision	5	3:00	
Legend: Win Loss Draw/No contest Notes

== Mixed martial arts record ==
Professional record breakdown
9 matches	5 wins	4 losses
By knockout	3	3
By decision	2	1

Res.	Record	Opponent	Method	Event	Date	Round	Time	Location	Notes
Loss	5–4	Jamie Edenden	TKO (punches)	HEX Fight Series 30	May 4, 2024	3	3:46	Auckland, New Zealand	Catchweight (165 lb) bout.
Loss	5–3	Larissa Pacheco	TKO (punches)	PFL 6 (2022)	July 1, 2022	1	2:39	Atlanta, Georgia, United States	
Win	5–2	Julia Budd	Decision (unanimous)	PFL 3 (2022)	May 6, 2022	3	5:00	Arlington, Texas, United States	Catchweight (160.8 lb) bout; Fabian missed weight.
Loss	4–2	Kayla Harrison	TKO (punches)	PFL 8 (2021)	August 19, 2021	1	4:01	Hollywood, Florida, United States	2021 PFL Women's Lightweight Tournament Semifinal.
Win	4–1	Julija Pajić	TKO (punches)	PFL 6 (2021)	June 25, 2021	2	4:16	Atlantic City, New Jersey, United States	
Win	3–1	Laura Sanchez	Decision (unanimous)	PFL 3 (2021)	May 6, 2021	3	5:00	Atlantic City, New Jersey, United States	
Win	2–1	Moriel Charneski	TKO (punches)	PFL 4 (2019)	July 11, 2019	1	1:42	Atlantic City, New Jersey, United States	
Loss	1–1	Bobbi-Jo Dalziel	Decision (unanimous)	PFL 1 (2019)	May 9, 2019	3	5:00	Uniondale, New York, United States	
Win	1–0	Jo Jo Obolevics	TKO (punches)	Bragging Rights 7: Resurrection	September 27, 2015	2	1:20	Madeley, Western Australia	

== Professional boxing record ==
2 fights	0 wins	0 losses
By knockout	0	0
By decision	0	0
Draws	1	
No contests	1	

No.	Result	Record	Opponent	Type	Round, time	Date	Location	Notes
2	Draw	0–0–1 (1 nc)	Trish Vaka	MD	4	14 Sep 2024	Viaduct Events Centre, Auckland, New Zealand	
1	NC	0–0 (1 nc)	Ariane Nicholson	NC	3 (6)	26 Mar 2021	Takapuna Rugby Football Club, Auckland, New Zealand	

== See also ==
- List of female mixed martial artists
