= PFL 2 (2024) =

Professional Fighters League MMA event in 2024

- The poster for PFL 2
- Promotion: Professional Fighters League
- Date: April 12, 2024
- Venue: The Theater at Virgin Hotels
- City: Las Vegas, Nevada, United States

Event chronology
PFL 1	PFL 2	PFL 3

The PFL 2 mixed martial arts event for the 2024 season of the Professional Fighters League was held on April 12, 2024, at The Theater at Virgin Hotels in Las Vegas, Nevada, United States. This marked the second regular-season event of the tournament and included fights in the Lightweight and Light Heavyweight divisions.

== Background ==
The event marked the promotion's sixteenth visit to Las Vegas and first since PFL 3 (2023) in April 2023.

A light heavyweight bout between former Bellator Light Heavyweight Champion Phil Davis and 2022 PFL light heavyweight winner Rob Wilkinson was expected to headline the event. However, Davis withdraw from the bout for unknown reason and was replaced by Tom Breese at the co-main event. As a result, a light heavyweight bout between 2023 PFL light heavyweight winner Impa Kasanganay and former LFA Light Heavyweight Champion Alex Polizzi was promoted to main event status.

The undercard also included the regular season, with the following fights being added as well:

- A lightweight bout between former Bellator Lightweight Champion Patricky Pitbull and Clay Collard.
- A lightweight bout between Mads Burnell and Michael Dufort.
- 2022 PFL welterweight winner Sadibou Sy made his a light heavyweight debut against Josh Silveira.
- The Ultimate Fighter: Brazil 3 heavyweight winner and 2021 PFL light heavyweight winner Antônio Carlos Júnior made his return from ACL injury against Simon Biyong in a light heavyweight bout.
- A light heavyweight bout between Dovletdzhan Yagshimuradov and 2023 PFL Europe light heavyweight winner Jakob Nedoh.
- A lightweight bout between former Bellator Lightweight Champion Brent Primus and Bruno Miranda.
- A lightweight bout between Gadzhi Rabadanov and Solomon Renfro.
- Jay Jay Wilson was expected to face Adam Piccolotti in a lightweight bout, but Wilson pulled out and was replaced by Elvin Espinoza, who scheduled to face Anthony Romero in an alternate bout at this event.

== Results ==
Main card (ESPN2 / ESPN+)
Weight class				Method	Round	Time	Notes
Light Heavyweight	Impa Kasanganay	def.	Alex Polizzi	TKO (punches)	1	3:39
Light Heavyweight	Rob Wilkinson	def.	Tom Breese	TKO (knee and punches)	1	1:10
Lightweight	Clay Collard	def.	Patricky Pitbull	TKO (punches)	2	1:32
Lightweight	Michael Dufort	def.	Mads Burnell	Submission (guillotine choke)	2	1:03
Light Heavyweight	Josh Silveira	def.	Sadibou Sy	TKO (finger injury)	1	1:40
Light Heavyweight	Antônio Carlos Júnior	def.	Simon Biyong	Submission (rear-naked choke)	1	4:34
Preliminary card (ESPN+)
Light Heavyweight	Dovletdzhan Yagshimuradov	def.	Jakob Nedoh	TKO (punches)	1	2:54
Lightweight	Brent Primus	def.	Bruno Miranda	Submission (rear-naked choke)	2	1:49
Lightweight	Gadzhi Rabadanov	def.	Solomon Renfro	Decision (unanimous) (29–28, 29–28, 29–28)	3	5:00
Lightweight	Elvin Espinoza	def.	Adam Piccolotti	KO (flying knee)	3	2:23
Heavyweight	Marcelo Nunes	def.	Jordan Heiderman	Submission (armbar)	1	2:40

== Standings after event ==
The PFL points system is based on results of the match. The winner of a fight receives 3 points. If the fight ends in a draw, both fighters will receive 1 point. The bonus for winning a fight in the first, second, or third round is 3 points, 2 points, and 1 point respectively. The bonus for winning in the third round requires a fight be stopped before 4:59 of the third round. No bonus point will be awarded if a fighter wins via decision. For example, if a fighter wins a fight in the first round, then the fighter will receive 6 total points. A decision win will result in three total points. If a fighter misses weight, the opponent (should they comply with weight limits) will receive 3 points due to a walkover victory, regardless of winning or losing the bout; if the non-offending fighter subsequently wins with a stoppage, all bonus points will be awarded.

=== Light heavyweight ===
Fighter	Wins	Draws	Losses	1st	2nd	3rd	Total Points (Note: The four fighters with most points advance to the playoffs)
(Australia) Rob Wilkinson	1	0	0	1	0	0	6
(United States) Josh Silveira	1	0	0	1	0	0	6
(Turkmenistan) Dovletdzhan Yagshimuradov	1	0	0	1	0	0	6
(United States) Impa Kasanganay	1	0	0	1	0	0	6
(Brazil) Antônio Carlos Júnior	1	0	0	1	0	0	6
(Cameroon) Simon Biyong	0	0	1	0	0	0	0
(United States) Alex Polizzi	0	0	1	0	0	0	0
(Slovenia) Jakob Nedoh	0	0	1	0	0	0	0
(Sweden) Sadibou Sy	0	0	1	0	0	0	0
(England) Tom Breese	0	0	1	0	0	0	0

=== Lightweight ===
Fighter	Wins	Draws	Losses	1st	2nd	3rd	Total Points (Note: The four fighters with most points advance to the playoffs)
(Canada) Michael Dufort	1	0	0	0	1	0	5
(United States) Clay Collard	1	0	0	0	1	0	5
(United States) Brent Primus	1	0	0	0	1	0	5
(Nicaragua) Elvin Espinoza	1	0	0	0	0	1	4
(Russia) Gadzhi Rabadanov	1	0	0	0	0	0	3
(United States) Solomon Renfro	0	0	1	0	0	0	0
(United States) Adam Piccolotti	0	0	1	0	0	0	0
(Brazil) Bruno Miranda	0	0	1	0	0	0	0
(Brazil) Patricky Pitbull	0	0	1	0	0	0	0
(Denmark) Mads Burnell	0	0	1	0	0	0	0

== See also ==
- List of PFL events
- List of current PFL fighters
