= PFL 4 (2019) =

Professional Fighters League MMA event in 2019

- The poster for PFL 4
- Promotion: Professional Fighters League
- Date: July 11, 2019
- Venue: Ocean Resort Casino
- City: Atlantic City, New Jersey

Event chronology
PFL 3	PFL 4	PFL 5

The PFL 4 mixed martial arts event for the 2019 season of the Professional Fighters League was held on July 11, 2019, at the Ocean Resort Casino in Atlantic City, New Jersey. This was the fourth regular season event of 2019 and include fights in the welterweight and women's lightweight divisions.

== Background ==
The day before the event a Women's Lightweight bout between Sarah Kaufman and Roberta Samad and a Welterweight bout between André Fialho and Zane Kamaka were both cancelled as Samad and Kamaka both missed weight for their respective bouts.

== Results ==
Main Card (ESPN2)
Weight class				Method	Round	Time	Notes
Welterweight	Magomed Magomedkerimov	def.	Chris Curtis	Decision (unanimous) (30-27, 30-27, 30-26)	3	5:00
Women's Lightweight	Kayla Harrison	def.	Morgan Frier	Submission (key lock)	1	3:35
Welterweight	João Zeferino	def.	Bojan Veličković	Decision (unanimous) (30-27, 30-27, 29-28)	3	5:00
Welterweight	John Howard	def.	Ray Cooper III	KO (punches)	1	3:23
Preliminary card (ESPN+)
Welterweight	Glaico França	def.	Sadibou Sy	TKO (punches)	3	4:29
Welterweight	David Michaud	def.	Handesson Ferreira	TKO (punches)	1	4:37
Women's Lightweight	Larissa Pacheco	def.	Bobbi-Jo Dalziel	Submission (armbar)	1	2:31
Women's Lightweight	Genah Fabian	def.	Moriel Charneski	TKO (punches)	1	1:42

== Standings After Event ==
The PFL points system is based on results of the match. The winner of a fight receives 3 points. If the fight ends in a draw, both fighters will receive 1 point. The bonus for winning a fight in the first, second, or third round is 3 points, 2 points, and 1 point respectively. The bonus for winning in the third round requires a fight be stopped before 4:59 of the third round. No bonus point will be awarded if a fighter wins via decision. For example, if a fighter wins a fight in the first round, then the fighter will receive 6 total points. A decision win will result in three total points. If a fighter misses weight, the opponent (should they comply with weight limits) will receive 3 points due to a walkover victory, regardless of winning or losing the bout; if the non-offending fighter subsequently wins with a stoppage, all bonus points will be awarded.

=== Welterweight ===
Fighter	Wins	Draws	Losses	1st	2nd	3rd	Total Points
♛ Glaico Franca	2	0	0	1	0	1	10
♛ Magomed Magomedkerimov	2	0	0	1	0	0	9
♛ Sadibou Sy	1	0	1	1	0	0	6
♛ John Howard	1	0	1	1	0	0	6
♛ David Michaud	1	0	1	1	0	0	6
♛ Ray Cooper III	1	0	1	0	1	0	5
♛ Chris Curtis	1	0	1	0	0	1	4
♛ André Fialho	1	0	1	0	0	0	3
E Handesson Ferreira	1	0	1	0	0	0	3
E João Zeferino	1	0	0	0	0	0	3
E Bojan Veličković	0	0	2	0	0	0	0
E Zane Kamaka	0	0	2	0	0	0	0

=== Women's Lightweight ===
Fighter	Wins	Draws	Losses	1st	2nd	3rd	Total Points
♛ Sarah Kaufman	2	0	0	1	0	0	9
♛ Kayla Harrison	2	0	0	1	0	0	9
♛ Genah Fabian	1	0	1	1	0	0	6
♛ Larissa Pacheco	1	0	1	1	0	0	6
E Bobbi-Jo Dalziel	1	0	0	0	0	0	3
E Roberta Samad	1	0	1	0	0	0	3
E Moriel Charneski	0	0	2	0	0	0	0
E Morgan Frier	0	0	2	0	0	0	0

♛ = Clinched playoff spot --- E = Eliminated

== See also ==
- List of PFL events
- List of current PFL fighters
