= PFL 3 (2022) =

Professional Fighters League MMA event in 2023

- The poster for PFL 3
- Promotion: Professional Fighters League
- Date: May 6, 2022
- Venue: Esports Stadium Arlington
- City: Arlington, Texas

Event chronology
PFL 2	PFL 3	PFL 4

The PFL 3 mixed martial arts event for the 2022 season of the Professional Fighters League was held on May 6, 2022, at the Esports Stadium Arlington in Arlington, Texas. It was the third regular season event of the tournament and included fights in the Women's Lightweight and Welterweight divisions.

== Background ==
The event will be headlined by a women's lightweight clash between the 2019 and 2021 champion Kayla Harrison and Bellator vet Marina Mokhnatkina. The co-main will feature a welterweight bout between 2019 and 2021 champion Ray Cooper III facing undefeated Magomed Umalatov. Umalatov would pull out of the bout and be replaced by former LFA Welterweight Champion Carlos Leal.

The remaining two fights of the main card will see lightweight bout between ex-UFC champ Anthony Pettis facing Bellator veteran Myles Price, while former Bellator Welterweight champion Rory MacDonald faces off against Bellator and ACA vet Brett Cooper.

A welterweight bout between Magomed Magomedkerimov and João Zeferino was scheduled for this event, however Magomedkerimov pulled out of the bout due to visa issues and was replaced by Dilano Taylor.

At weigh-ins, Ray Cooper III and Genah Fabian missed weight for their bouts. Cooper weighed in at 176.4 pounds, 5.4 pounds over the welterweight non-title fight limit. Fabian weighed in at 160.8 pounds, 4.8 pounds over the lightweight non-title fight limit. They were fined 20 percent of their purses, ineligible to win playoff points, given a walkover loss, and were penalized one point in the standings. Carlos Leal and Julia Budd received walkover wins regardless of bout outcome but are eligible to gain stoppage points.

== Results ==
Main Card (ESPN 2)
Weight class				Method	Round	Time	Notes
Women's Lightweight	Kayla Harrison	def.	Marina Mokhnatkina	Decision (unanimous) (30–27, 30–27, 30–27)	3	5:00
Catchweight (177 lbs)	Carlos Leal	def.	Ray Cooper III	Decision (unanimous) (30–26, 30–27, 29–27)	3	5:00	(Note: Cooper missed weight (176.4 lbs))
Lightweight	Anthony Pettis	def.	Myles Price	Submission (triangle choke)	1	4:17
Welterweight	Rory MacDonald	def.	Brett Cooper	Submission (rear-naked choke)	1	2:23
Women's Lightweight	Larissa Pacheco	def.	Zamzagul Fayzallanova	TKO (punches)	1	1:25
Preliminary card (ESPN+)
Welterweight	Dilano Taylor	def.	João Zeferino	Decision (split) (29–28, 28–29, 29–28)	3	5:00
Catchweight (161 lbs)	Genah Fabian	def.	Julia Budd	Decision (unanimous) (29–28, 29–28, 29–28)	3	5:00	(Note: Fabian missed weight (160.8 lbs))
Welterweight	Sadibou Sy	def.	Nikolai Aleksakhin	Decision (split) (29–28, 27-30, 29–28)	3	5:00
Welterweight	Jarrah Al Silawi	def.	Gleison Tibau	Decision (split) (30–27, 28–29, 29–28)	3	5:00
Women's Lightweight	Olena Kolesnyk	def.	Abigail Montes	Decision (split) (30–27, 28–29, 29–28)	3	5:00
Women's Lightweight	Martina Jindrová	def.	Vanessa Melo	Decision (unanimous) (30–27, 30–27, 30–27)	3	5:00

== Standings After Event ==
The PFL points system is based on results of the match. The winner of a fight receives 3 points. If the fight ends in a draw, both fighters will receive 1 point. The bonus for winning a fight in the first, second, or third round is 3 points, 2 points, and 1 point respectively. The bonus for winning in the third round requires a fight be stopped before 4:59 of the third round. No bonus point will be awarded if a fighter wins via decision. For example, if a fighter wins a fight in the first round, then the fighter will receive 6 total points. A decision win will result in three total points. If a fighter misses weight, the opponent (should they comply with weight limits) will receive 3 points due to a walkover victory, regardless of winning or losing the bout; if the non-offending fighter subsequently wins with a stoppage, all bonus points will be awarded.

=== Welterweight ===
Fighter	Wins	Draws	Losses	1st	2nd	3rd	Total Points (Note: The four fighters with most points advance to the playoffs)
Rory MacDonald	1	0	0	1	0	0	6
Carlos Leal	1	0	0	0	0	0	3
Dilano Taylor	1	0	0	0	0	0	3
Jarrah Al Silawi	1	0	0	0	0	0	3
Sadibou Sy	1	0	0	0	0	0	3
Nikolai Aleksakhin	0	0	1	0	0	0	0
Gleison Tibau	0	0	1	0	0	0	0
João Zeferino	0	0	1	0	0	0	0
Brett Cooper	0	0	1	0	0	0	0
Ray Cooper III	0	0	1	0	0	0	-1

=== Women's Lightweight ===
Fighter	Wins	Draws	Losses	1st	2nd	3rd	Total Points (Note: The four fighters with most points advance to the playoffs)
Larissa Pacheco	1	0	0	1	0	0	6
Kayla Harrison	1	0	0	0	0	0	3
Martina Jindrová	1	0	0	0	0	0	3
Olena Kolesnyk	1	0	0	0	0	0	3
Julia Budd	0	0	1	0	0	0	3
Abigail Montes	0	0	1	0	0	0	0
Vanessa Melo	0	0	1	0	0	0	0
Marina Mokhnatkina	0	0	1	0	0	0	0
Zamzagul Fayzallanova	0	0	1	0	0	0	0
Genah Fabian	1	0	0	0	0	0	-1

=== Lightweight ===
Fighter	Wins	Draws	Losses	1st	2nd	3rd	Total Points (Note: The eight fighters with most points advance to the playoffs)
Anthony Pettis	1	0	0	1	0	0	6
Raush Manfio	1	0	0	0	0	1	4
Clay Collard	1	0	0	0	0	0	3
Alex Martinez	1	0	0	0	0	0	3
Olivier Aubin-Mercier	1	0	0	0	0	0	3
Natan Schulte	0	0	1	0	0	0	0
Stevie Ray	0	0	1	0	0	0	0
Jeremy Stephens	0	0	1	0	0	0	0
Don Madge	0	0	1	0	0	0	0
Myles Price	0	0	1	0	0	0	0

== See also ==
- List of PFL events
- List of current PFL fighters
