= PFL 6 (2022) =

Professional Fighters League MMA event in 2022

- The poster for PFL 6
- Promotion: Professional Fighters League
- Date: July 1, 2022
- Venue: Overtime Elite Arena
- City: Atlanta, Georgia

Event chronology
PFL 5	PFL 6	PFL 7

The PFL 6 mixed martial arts event for the 2022 season of the Professional Fighters League was held on July 1, 2022, at the Overtime Elite Arena in Atlanta, Georgia. This marked the sixth regular season event of the tournament and included fights in the Women's Lightweight and Welterweight divisions.

== Background ==
The event was to be headlined by a women's lightweight clash between the 2019 and 2021 champion Kayla Harrison will face former Bellator Women's Featherweight Champion Julia Budd. However, a week before the event, Budd pulled out due to injury and was replaced by Kaitlin Young.

The co-main event featured former Bellator Welterweight champion Rory MacDonald face off against Sadibou Sy. The rest of the main card saw a welterweight bout between 2019 and 2021 champion Ray Cooper III against Bellator MMA and ACA vet Brett Cooper while Magomed Magomedkerimov was scheduled to face off against João Zeferino. At weigh-ins, Zeferino didn't weigh in and was replaced in his bout against Magomed Magomedkerimov by Dilano Taylor.

A welterweight bout between Gleison Tibau and Nikolai Aleksakhin was scheduled at this event, however Tibau pulled out of the bout and was replaced by Carlos Leal. After making weight, Aleksakhin withdrew from the bout due to complications. Leal receives a walkover win and 3 points in the welterweight standings.

== Results ==
Main Card (ESPN/ESPN+)
Weight class				Method	Round	Time	Notes
Women's Lightweight	Kayla Harrison	def.	Kaitlin Young	TKO (punches)	1	2:35
Welterweight	Sadibou Sy	def.	Rory MacDonald	Decision (unanimous) (30–27, 30–27, 29–28)	3	5:00
Welterweight	Ray Cooper III	def.	Brett Cooper	TKO (knees and punches)	1	0:24
Welterweight	Magomed Magomedkerimov	def.	Dilano Taylor	TKO (punches)	2	3:26
Women's Lightweight	Larissa Pacheco	def.	Genah Fabian	TKO (punches)	1	2:39
Welterweight	Magomed Umalatov	def.	Jarrah Al Silawi	KO (punch)	1	3:33
Preliminary card (ESPN+)
Women's Lightweight	Marina Mokhnatkina	def.	Abigail Montes	Decision (split) (30–27, 27–30, 30–27)	3	5:00
Women's Lightweight	Martina Jindrová	def.	Zamzagul Fayzallanova	TKO (punches)	1	4:04
Women's Lightweight	Olena Kolesnyk	def.	Vanessa Melo	Decision (unanimous) (30–27, 30–27, 30–27)	3	5:00

== Standings After Event ==
The PFL points system is based on results of the match. The winner of a fight receives 3 points. If the fight ends in a draw, both fighters will receive 1 point. The bonus for winning a fight in the first, second, or third round is 3 points, 2 points, and 1 point respectively. The bonus for winning in the third round requires a fight be stopped before 4:59 of the third round. No bonus point will be awarded if a fighter wins via decision. For example, if a fighter wins a fight in the first round, then the fighter will receive 6 total points. A decision win will result in three total points. If a fighter misses weight, the opponent (should they comply with weight limits) will receive 3 points due to a walkover victory, regardless of winning or losing the bout; if the non-offending fighter subsequently wins with a stoppage, all bonus points will be awarded.

=== Welterweight ===
Fighter	Wins	Draws	Losses	1st	2nd	3rd	Total Points (Note: The four fighters with most points advance to the playoffs)
(Canada) Rory MacDonald	1	0	1	1	0	0	6
(Sweden) Sadibou Sy	2	0	0	0	0	0	6
(Brazil) Carlos Leal	1	0	0	0	0	0	6
(Russia) Magomed Umalatov	1	0	0	1	0	0	6
(Russia) Magomed Magomedkerimov	1	0	0	0	1	0	5
(United States) Ray Cooper III	1	0	1	1	0	0	5
(United States) Dilano Taylor	1	0	1	0	0	0	3
(Jordan) Jarrah Al Silawi	1	0	1	0	0	0	3
(United States) Brett Cooper	0	0	1	0	0	0	0
(Russia) Nikolai Aleksakhin	0	0	1	0	0	0	0
(Brazil) Gleison Tibau	0	0	1	0	0	0	0
(Brazil) João Zeferino	0	0	1	0	0	0	-1

=== Women's Lightweight ===
Fighter	Wins	Draws	Losses	1st	2nd	3rd	Total Points (Note: The four fighters with most points advance to the playoffs)
(Brazil) Larissa Pacheco	2	0	0	2	0	0	12
(United States) Kayla Harrison	2	0	0	1	0	0	9
(Czech Republic) Martina Jindrová	2	0	0	1	0	0	9
(Ukraine) Olena Kolesnyk	2	0	0	0	0	0	6
(Russia) Marina Mokhnatkina	1	0	1	0	0	0	3
(Canada) Julia Budd	0	0	1	0	0	0	3
(Mexico) Abigail Montes	0	0	2	0	0	0	0
(Brazil) Vanessa Melo	0	0	2	0	0	0	0
(Kazakhstan) Zamzagul Fayzallanova	0	0	2	0	0	0	0
(United States) Kaitlin Young	0	0	1	0	0	0	0
(New Zealand) Genah Fabian	1	0	1	0	0	0	-1

== Reported payout ==
The following is the reported payout to the fighters as reported to the Georgia Athletic Commission. The amounts do not include sponsor money, discretionary bonuses, viewership points or additional earnings.

- Kayla Harrison: $500,000 ($500,000 show, no win bonus) def. Kaitlin Young: $20,000
- Sadibou Sy: $52,000 ($26,000 show + $26,000 win) def. Rory MacDonald: $250,000
- Ray Cooper: $200,000 ($150,000 show + $50,000 win) def. Brett Cooper: $20,000
- Magomed Magomedkerimov: $200,000 ($100,000 show + $100,000 win) def. Dilano Taylor: $13,000
- Larissa Pacheco: $48,000 ($24,000 show + $24,000 win) def. Genah Fabian: $20,000
- Magomed Umalatov: $32,000 ($16,000 show + $16,000 win) def. Jarrah Hussein: $56,000
- Marina Mokhnatkina: $32,000 ($16,000 show + $16,000 win) def. Abigail Montes: $13,000
- Martina Jindrova: $42,000 ($21,000 show + $21,000 win) def. Zamzagul Fayzallanova: $10,000
- Olena Kolesnyk: $22,000 ($11,000 show + $11,000 win) def. Vanessa Melo: $13,000

== See also ==
- List of PFL events
- List of current PFL fighters
