= Chris Curtis (fighter) =

American mixed martial artist (born 1987)

- Born: Christopher Alan Curtis; July 15, 1987 (age 39); Cincinnati, Ohio, U.S.
- Other names: The Action Man
- Height: 5 ft 10 in (1.78 m)
- Weight: 170 lb (77 kg; 12 st 2 lb)
- Division: Light Heavyweight; Middleweight; Welterweight
- Reach: 75 in (191 cm)
- Fighting out of: Las Vegas, Nevada, U.S.
- Team: Vision MMA (formerly); Son of Siam (until 2017); Team Quest (2015–2019); Syndicate MMA (2019–present); Xtreme Couture (2019–present)
- Rank: Purple belt in Brazilian Jiu-Jitsu
- Years active: 2009–present

Professional boxing record
- Total: 2
- Wins: 2
- By knockout: 1
- Losses: 0

Mixed martial arts record
- Total: 46
- Wins: 32
- By knockout: 17
- By submission: 1
- By decision: 14
- Losses: 13
- By knockout: 2
- By submission: 1
- By decision: 10
- No contests: 1

Other information
- Boxing record from BoxRec
- Mixed martial arts record from Sherdog

Christopher Alan Curtis (born July 15, 1987) is an American professional mixed martial artist and former boxer. He currently competes in the Welterweight division of the Ultimate Fighting Championship (UFC). A professional since 2009, he has also competed for the Professional Fighters League (PFL).

== Early life ==
Curtis was born and grew up in Cincinnati, Ohio. He has a sister and a brother. Despite aspirations of becoming a lawyer, he dropped out of school in pursuit of a career in mixed martial arts.

== Mixed martial arts career ==
=== Early career ===
Curtis amassed a record of 18–5 in the North American regional circuit while capturing Welterweight Championships in CES MMA, Z Promotions and Premier MMA Championship.

=== Dana White's Contender Series and first retirement ===
Curtis was then invited to face Sean Lally at Dana White's Contender Series 9 on June 12, 2018. He won the fight via third-round knockout but retired after he was not awarded a UFC contract.

Curtis would however return to fight for the vacant Z Promotions Middleweight title against Matt Dwyer on January 21, 2019, winning the bout via majority decision.

=== Professional Fighters League ===
On April 1, 2019, it was revealed that Curtis would be participating PFL 2019 season in the welterweight division. He was initially set to face PFL Season 2018 Middleweight Champion Louis Taylor at PFL 1 on May 9, 2019. However, Taylor was not able to get medically cleared and had to withdraw from the season, subsequently being replaced by André Fialho. Curtis won the bout via third-round knockout.

In the second regular season bout Curtis faced PFL Season 2018 Welterweight Champion Magomed Magomedkerimov at PFL 4 on July 11, 2019. He lost the fight via unanimous decision but advanced to the playoffs.

==== Playoffs, second and third retirement ====
In the quarterfinals Curtis faced Magomedkerimov in a rematch at PFL 7 on October 11, 2019. Again he lost the bout via unanimous decision, was eliminated from the season and retired from the sport.

However, after their bout Magomedkerimov fell ill and Curtis ended his retirement by stepping in to replace Magomedkerimov against Ray Cooper III in a semifinal bout. He lost the fight via second-round knockout and retired from the sport once again.

=== Return from retirement and other organizations ===
Curtis would, however, quickly return from retirement to defend his Z Promotions title in January 2020, defeating Darren Smith Jr. via corner stoppage at the end of the fourth.

On April 14, 2020, it was announced that Curtis had come out of retirement and signed a multi-fight contract with ARES FC. He was scheduled to make his promotional debut against Nassourdine Imavov at ARES FC 2 on April 3, 2020. However, the event was postponed due to the COVID-19 pandemic to take place on October 30, 2020, before being cancelled altogether.

Curtis was scheduled to face Austin Vanderford on November 5, 2020, at Bellator 251. However, Curtis had to pull out of the bout due to a positive COVID test and was replaced by Vinicius de Jesus.

Curtis faced Kyle Stewart on January 30, 2021, at XMMA 1. He won the bout via TKO in the third round.

After winning the next two bouts against Juan Ramon Grano Medina at iKon Fighting Federation 6 via first round TKO and Jarome Hatch at Fierce FC 15 via TKO stoppage in the third, Curtis faced Kenny Robertson on July 30, 2021, at XMMA 2. He won the bout via unanimous decision.

=== Ultimate Fighting Championship ===
Curtis was briefly expected to replace Deron Winn against Phil Hawes on day's notice at UFC on ESPN 26 on October 9, 2021, but Hawes ultimately declined the bout. Nevertheless, the bout was later rebooked to take place at UFC 268 on November 6, 2021. Curtis won the fight via first-round knockout.

Replacing Roman Dolidze on short notice, Curtis faced Brendan Allen on December 4, 2021, at UFC on ESPN: Font vs. Aldo. He won the fight via technical knockout in round two. The win earned him a Performance of the Night bonus award.

Curtis was then expected to face Dricus Du Plessis at UFC 273 on April 9, 2022. However, Curtis withdrew from the bout due to a wrist injury and was replaced by Anthony Hernandez.

Curtis then faced Rodolfo Vieira at UFC on ESPN: Tsarukyan vs. Gamrot on June 25, 2022. He won the fight via unanimous decision.

Curtis faced Jack Hermansson on July 23, 2022, at UFC Fight Night 208, replacing the injured Darren Till. He lost the fight via unanimous decision.

Curtis faced Joaquin Buckley on December 10, 2022, at UFC 282. He won the fight via technical knockout in round two. This fight earned him another Performance of the Night award.

Curtis faced Kelvin Gastelum on April 8, 2023, at UFC 287. He lost the bout via unanimous decision. This fight earned him the Fight of the Night award.

Curtis faced Nassourdine Imavov on June 10, 2023, at UFC 289. The bout ended in a no contest in the second round after an accidental clash of heads left Curtis unable to continue due to a severe cut above his eye.

Curtis was scheduled to face Anthony Hernandez at UFC Fight Night 227 on September 16, 2023. However, Curtis withdrew due to a rib injury and was replaced by Roman Kopylov.

Curtis faced Marc-André Barriault on January 20, 2024, at UFC 297. He won in a competitive bout by split decision.

Replacing Marvin Vettori, Curtis faced Brendan Allen in a rematch on April 6, 2024, at UFC Fight Night 240. Curtis lost the fight by split decision.

Curtis was scheduled to face Kevin Holland on October 5, 2024 at UFC 307. However, Curtis withdrew from the fight due to a foot fracture and was replaced by Roman Dolidze.

Curtis faced Roman Kopylov on January 11, 2025 at UFC Fight Night 249. In a competitive bout, he lost the fight by a head kick knockout with one second left in the third round. This fight earned him another Fight of the Night award.

Curtis faced Max Griffin in a return to the welterweight division on July 12, 2025 at UFC on ESPN 70. He won the fight by split decision.

Curtis faced Myktybek Orolbai on March 14, 2026 at UFC Fight Night 269. He lost the fight by unanimous decision.

Curtis is scheduled to face Geoff Neal on January 16, 2027 at UFC Fight Night 296.

== Personal life ==
Curtis has a son (born 2007) from a previous relationship. Curtis and his current spouse had their first child in October 2023.

== Championships and accomplishments ==
- Ultimate Fighting Championship
  - Performance of the Night (Two times) vs. Brendan Allen 1 and Joaquin Buckley
  - Fight of the Night (Two times) vs. Kelvin Gastelum and Roman Kopylov
  - UFC.com Awards
    - 2021: Ranked #4 Newcomer of the Year
- CES MMA
  - CES MMA Welterweight Championship (one time; former)
    - Two successful title defenses
- Z Promotions
  - Z Promotions Welterweight Championship (one time; former)
    - One successful title defense
  - Z Promotions Middleweight Championship (one time; former)
- Premier MMA Championship
  - PMMAC Welterweight Championship (one time; former)
- MMA Junkie
  - 2021 Comeback Fighter of the Year

== Mixed martial arts record ==
Professional record breakdown
46 matches	32 wins	13 losses
By knockout	17	2
By submission	1	1
By decision	14	10
No contests	1	

Res.	Record	Opponent	Method	Event	Date	Round	Time	Location	Notes
Loss	32–13 (1)	Myktybek Orolbai	Decision (unanimous)	UFC Fight Night: Emmett vs. Vallejos	March 14, 2026	3	5:00	Las Vegas, Nevada, United States	
Win	32–12 (1)	Max Griffin	Decision (split)	UFC on ESPN: Lewis vs. Teixeira	July 12, 2025	3	5:00	Nashville, Tennessee, United States	Return to Welterweight.
Loss	31–12 (1)	Roman Kopylov	TKO (head kick)	UFC Fight Night: Dern vs. Ribas 2	January 11, 2025	3	4:59	Las Vegas, Nevada, United States	Fight of the Night.
Loss	31–11 (1)	Brendan Allen	Decision (split)	UFC Fight Night: Allen vs. Curtis 2	April 6, 2024	5	5:00	Las Vegas, Nevada, United States	
Win	31–10 (1)	Marc-André Barriault	Decision (split)	UFC 297	January 20, 2024	3	5:00	Toronto, Ontario, Canada	
NC	30–10 (1)	Nassourdine Imavov	NC (accidental clash of heads)	UFC 289	June 10, 2023	2	3:04	Vancouver, British Columbia, Canada	Accidental clash of heads rendered Curtis unable to continue.
Loss	30–10	Kelvin Gastelum	Decision (unanimous)	UFC 287	April 8, 2023	3	5:00	Miami, Florida, United States	Fight of the Night.
Win	30–9	Joaquin Buckley	KO (punches)	UFC 282	December 10, 2022	2	2:49	Las Vegas, Nevada, United States	Performance of the Night.
Loss	29–9	Jack Hermansson	Decision (unanimous)	UFC Fight Night: Blaydes vs. Aspinall	July 23, 2022	3	5:00	London, England	
Win	29–8	Rodolfo Vieira	Decision (unanimous)	UFC on ESPN: Tsarukyan vs. Gamrot	June 25, 2022	3	5:00	Las Vegas, Nevada, United States	
Win	28–8	Brendan Allen	TKO (punches and knees)	UFC on ESPN: Font vs. Aldo	December 4, 2021	2	1:58	Las Vegas, Nevada, United States	Performance of the Night.
Win	27–8	Phil Hawes	KO (punches)	UFC 268	November 6, 2021	1	4:27	New York City, New York, United States	Return to Middleweight.
Win	26–8	Kenny Robertson	Decision (unanimous)	XMMA 2	July 30, 2021	3	5:00	Greenville, South Carolina, United States	Welterweight bout.
Win	25–8	Jarome Hatch	TKO (punches)	Fierce FC 15	May 14, 2021	3	1:30	West Valley City, Utah, United States	Light Heavyweight debut.
Win	24–8	Juan Ramon Grano Medina	TKO (punches)	iKon Fighting Federation 6	April 2, 2021	1	4:13	Los Mochis, Mexico	
Win	23–8	Kyle Stewart	TKO (punches)	XMMA 1	January 30, 2021	3	1:41	West Palm Beach, Florida, United States	Return to Middleweight.
Win	22–8	Darren Smith Jr.	TKO (corner stoppage)	Z Promotions Fight Night 12	January 25, 2020	4	5:00	Lethbridge, Alberta, Canada	Defended the Z Promotions Welterweight Championship.
Loss	21–8	Ray Cooper III	KO (punch)	PFL 7 (2019)	October 11, 2019	2	0:11	Las Vegas, Nevada, United States	2019 PFL Welterweight Tournament Semifinal.
Loss	21–7	Magomed Magomedkerimov	Decision (unanimous)	PFL 7 (2019)	October 11, 2019	2	5:00	Las Vegas, Nevada, United States	2019 PFL Welterweight Tournament Quarterfinal.
Loss	21–6	Magomed Magomedkerimov	Decision (unanimous)	PFL 4 (2019)	July 11, 2019	3	5:00	Atlantic City, New Jersey, United States	
Win	21–5	André Fialho	TKO (punches)	PFL 1 (2019)	May 9, 2019	3	4:17	Uniondale, New York, United States	Return to Welterweight.
Win	20–5	Matt Dwyer	Decision (majority)	Z Promotions Fight Night 9	January 25, 2019	5	5:00	Lethbridge, Alberta, Canada	Won the vacant Z Promotions Middleweight Championship.
Win	19–5	Sean Lally	TKO (hook kick and punches)	Dana White's Contender Series 9	June 12, 2018	3	1:37	Las Vegas, Nevada, United States	
Win	18–5	Jason Norwood	Decision (unanimous)	CES MMA 49	April 6, 2018	5	5:00	Lincoln, Rhode Island, United States	Defended the CES MMA Welterweight Championship.
Win	17–5	Peter Grajcar	Decision (unanimous)	Z Promotions Fight Night 5	September 9, 2017	5	5:00	Medicine Hat, Alberta, Canada	Won the Z Promotions Welterweight Championship.
Win	16–5	Portland Pringle III	TKO (punches)	Premier MMA Championship 3	May 27, 2017	4	4:22	Covington, Kentucky, United States	Won the vacant PMMAC Welterweight Championship.
Win	15–5	Will Santiago Jr.	TKO (knees and punches)	CES MMA 42	March 31, 2017	2	1:08	Lincoln, Rhode Island, United States	Defended the CES MMA Welterweight Championship.
Win	14–5	Leo Bercier	Decision (unanimous)	Final Fight Championship 24	June 3, 2016	3	5:00	Daytona Beach, Florida, United States	Catchweight (190 lb) bout.
Loss	13–5	Nah-Shon Burrell	Decision (unanimous)	CES MMA 34	April 1, 2016	5	5:00	Mashantucket, Connecticut, United States	Non-title bout; Burrell missed weight (176 lb).
Win	13–4	Gil de Freitas	TKO (submission to punches)	CES MMA 32	January 8, 2016	1	3:13	Lincoln, Rhode Island, United States	Won the CES MMA Welterweight Championship.
Win	12–4	Amaechi Oselukwue	Decision (unanimous)	Absolute Action MMA 44	October 24, 2015	3	5:00	Highland Heights, Kentucky, United States	Catchweight (180 lb) bout.
Win	11–4	Tyson Triplett	TKO (submission to punches)	Absolute Action MMA 42	April 24, 2015	3	5:00	Highland Heights, Kentucky, United States	Middleweight bout.
Loss	10–4	Belal Muhammad	Decision (unanimous)	Hoosier Fight Club 21	September 13, 2014	3	5:00	Valparaiso, Indiana, United States	Welterweight debut.
Win	10–3	Tiawan Howard	Submission (armbar)	Coveted FC 3	June 21, 2014	2	2:37	Mentor, Ohio, United States	Catchweight (180 lb) bout.
Win	9–3	Rex Harris	Decision (split)	PA Cage Fight 18	May 24, 2014	3	5:00	Kingston, Pennsylvania, United States	
Win	8–3	Ron Keslar	Decision (unanimous)	MMA Xtreme: Fists Will Fly	August 24, 2013	3	5:00	Evansville, Indiana, United States	
Loss	7–3	Forrest Petz	Decision (unanimous)	NAAFS: Fight Night in the Flats 9	June 1, 2013	3	5:00	Cleveland, Ohio, United States	
Win	7–2	Andrew Trace	Decision (unanimous)	Turf Wars 3	October 8, 2011	3	5:00	Florence, Kentucky, United States	
Win	6–2	Micah Bender	TKO (punches)	Rocktagon MMA 6	July 30, 2011	2	0:22	North Olmsted, Ohio, United States	
Loss	5–2	Tom Gallichio	Submission (rear-naked choke)	Xtreme Caged Combat: Reckless Abandon	May 20, 2011	3	2:08	Philadelphia, Pennsylvania, United States	
Win	5–1	Erick Jordan	KO (knee)	Spartan FC 6	December 10, 2010	2	2:21	Ashland, Kentucky, United States	
Win	4–1	Rob Nickerson III	KO (knee)	Absolute Action MMA 6	October 16, 2010	1	0:43	Florence, Kentucky, United States	
Win	3–1	Kevin Powers	TKO (punches)	Universal Cage Combat: Lights, Camera, Maximum Action	October 8, 2010	1	1:33	Lawrenceburg, Indiana, United States	
Win	2–1	Nah-Shon Burrell	Decision (unanimous)	Xtreme Caged Combat: Hostile Intent	October 1, 2010	3	5:00	Feasterville, Pennsylvania, United States	
Win	1–1	Ian Rammel	Decision (unanimous)	ICE Extreme Fighting 46	May 1, 2010	3	5:00	Forest Park, Ohio, United States	
Loss	0–1	Brandon Pinkston	Decision (split)	Revolution Fight League: Maximum Impact	June 27, 2009	3	5:00	Hammond, Indiana, United States	Middleweight debut.

== Professional boxing record ==
2 fights	2 wins	0 losses
By knockout	1	0
By decision	1	0

No.	Result	Record	Opponent	Type	Round, time	Date	Location	Notes
2	Win	2–0	(United States) Marcus Maulding	TKO	2 (4), 1:35	30 December 2016	(United States) B.O.O.M Fitness Center, Cincinnati, Ohio, US	
1	Win	1–0	(United States) Michael Davis	UD	4	29 January 2016	(United States) Highland Heights, Kentucky, US	

== See also ==
- List of current UFC fighters
- List of Dana White's Contender Series alumni
- List of male mixed martial artists
