= Sadibou Sy =

Swedish mixed martial arts fighter

- Born: November 27, 1986 (age 39); Stockholm, Sweden
- Other names: The Swedish Denzel
- Height: 6 ft 3 in (1.91 m)
- Weight: 185 lb (84 kg; 13 st 3 lb)
- Division: Light heavyweight Welterweight
- Reach: 80 in (203 cm)
- Fighting out of: Stockholm, Sweden
- Team: Xtreme Couture
- Years active: 2005-2012 (Kickboxing); 2013–present (MMA)

Mixed martial arts record
- Total: 29
- Wins: 17
- By knockout: 9
- By decision: 8
- Losses: 9
- By knockout: 3
- By submission: 3
- By decision: 3
- Draws: 2
- No contests: 1

Other information
- Mixed martial arts record from Sherdog

Sadibou Sy
Medal record

Representing Sweden

Muay Thai

World Championships
Gold medal – first place	2010 Bangkok	−86 kg
Silver medal – second place	2012 St. Petersburg	−86 kg

Kickboxing

World Championships
Silver medal – second place	2007 Coimbra	−86 kg
Gold medal – first place	2008 Phnom Penh	−86 kg
Gold medal – first place	2009 Olomouc	−86 kg
Gold medal – first place	2010 Alicante	−86 kg

European Championships
Gold medal – first place	2007 Szentes	−86 kg

Sadibou Sy (born November 27, 1986) is a Swedish mixed martial artist who competes in the Light Heavyweight division of the Professional Fighters League.

== Background ==
Sadibou Sy, a mixed martial artist with Senegalese roots, grew up in a large family with six siblings in Sweden. He initially played football before transitioning to martial arts when he was in his teens. Sy began training at Wasa Martial Arts Center, focusing on kickboxing and later competed in Thai boxing. From the age of 13 until February 2017, Sy only had between 20 and 40% vision. He was then fitted with contact lenses to alleviate the chronic inflammation he suffered from. The lenses gave him about 80% vision and since then, he says his progress has been "huge". Despite his vision problems, he started competing in martial arts at the age of 15.

Sy has worked various jobs throughout his career, but now focuses on training at the Martial Arts Lab in Östermalm, where he also works as a personal trainer. Sy's goal is to minimize his work commitments and concentrate on his MMA career, aiming to secure better pay and sponsorships.

== Muay Thai career ==
On October 13, 2012, Sy faced Corentin Jallon at Supremacy League in Stockholm, Sweden, for the vacant WKN Oriental rules Cruiserweight title. Sy won the fight by unanimous decision.

== Mixed martial arts career ==
=== Early career ===
Before transitioning to MMA, Sy won both the World Championship and World Championship (B) in Thai boxing in 2010. He also claimed the ISKA (International Sport Karate & Kickboxing Association) World Championship title in 2008 and 2010. Sy began his MMA career in Stockholm-based organization IRFA (International Ring Fight Arena) and amassed a 2–1 record before joining Superior Challenge. In his debut at SC 12, he defeated Englishman Carl Booth via first-round TKO. After two fights with other organizations, Sy returned to Superior Challenge with a 6–2 record. At SC 14, he gained widespread attention for his viral head-kick KO against Welshman David Round. Sy continued his winning streak at SC 16, defeating Greek fighter Nikos Sokolis with another first-round TKO.

=== Professional Fighters League ===
==== 2018 Season ====
Sadibou Sy, boasting a 6–2 record, joined the Professional Fighters League (PFL) with an ambitious goal of winning the top prize of one million USD. He debuted against UFC and Bellator veteran Bruno Santos at PFL 3, ultimately losing via unanimous decision. In his second fight of the 2018 season at PFL 7, Sy defeated Brazilian Caio Magalhães with a first-round head kick KO, securing his spot in the playoffs. During the playoffs at PFL 10, he faced Santos once again, resulting in a draw but advancing due to PFL tiebreaker rules, before being eliminated by German Abusupiyan Magomedov via unanimous decision.

==== 2019 Season ====
Starting the 2019 season at PFL 1, Sy began with a stunning 17-second liver kick KO victory over American David Michaud. However, he lost his next fight to Glaico França at PFL 4 via TKO in the third round. Despite the loss, Sy advanced to the playoffs at PFL 7 based on points.

He faced Ray Cooper III in the quarterfinals at PFL 7 on October 11, 2019, with the fight ending in a draw with Cooper advancing, due to PFL rules where the winner of the first round advances, which led to Sy's elimination from the 2019 playoffs.

==== 2021 Season ====
After the 2020 season was cancelled due to COVID, Sadibou returned at PFL 2 on April 29, 2021, against Nikolay Aleksakhin, with the bout ending in a no contest after an accidental eye poke in the second round led to Aleksakhin being unable to continue.

Sy faced Alexey Kunchenko at PFL 5 on June 17, 2021. He won the bout via unanimous decision.

Sy, replacing João Zeferino, faced Magomed Magomedkerimov in a Semi-Final match-up at PFL 7 on August 13, 2021. He lost the bout via unanimous decision.

==== 2022 Season ====
Sy rematched Nikolay Aleksakhin on May 6, 2022, at PFL 3, winning the close bout via split decision.

Sy faced Rory MacDonald on July 1, 2022, at PFL 6. In an upset, Sy won the bout via unanimous decision.

In the semi-finals at PFL 8, Sy faced Carlos Leal, winning the bout and advancing to the finals via unanimous decision.

At the finals on November 25, 2022, at PFL 10, Sy won the bout and the $1 million dollar cumulative prize via unanimous decision.

==== 2023 Season ====
Sy started off the 2023 season against Jarrah Al-Silawi on April 14, 2023. Sy won the bout via TKO after knocking out Al-Silawi with knee to the body followed up with punches.

Sy faced Shane Mitchell on June 23, 2023, at PFL 6. He won the fight via spinning wheel kick knockout in the third round.

In the semi-finals, Sy faced Carlos Leal at PFL 9 on August 23, 2023. At weigh-ins, Carlos Leal weighed in at 172 pounds, 1 pound over the Welterweight limit. Leal was fined 20 percent of his purse, which went to his opponent Sy, and started the bout with a one point subtraction. Sy won the fight via split decision to advance to the finals.

In the final, Sy faced Magomed Magomedkerimov on November 24, 2023, at PFL 10. He lost the fight via a guillotine choke submission in the third round.

==== 2024 Season ====
Moving up to Light Heavyweight, Sy started the 2024 season with a bout against Josh Silveira on April 12, 2024 at PFL 2. He lost the fight by technical knockout as a result of a finger injury.

Sy was expect to face Tom Breese on June 21, 2024, at PFL 5. However, Breese withdrew at the last minute and was replaced by Andrew Sanchez. Sy won the fight via TKO in the third round.

==== 2025 PFL World Tournament ====
On February 25, 2025, the promotion officially revealed that Sy joined the 2025 PFL Middleweight Tournament.

In the quarterfinal, Sy faced Dalton Rosta on April 18, 2025, at PFL 3. He lost the fight via brabo choke in round two.

== Championships and accomplishments ==
=== Mixed martial arts ===
- Professional Fighters League
  - 2022 PFL Welterweight Championship
- ESPN
  - 2023 All-Purpose Finish of the Year vs. Shane Mitchell at PFL 6

=== Kickboxing ===
- World Kickboxing Network
  - 2012 WKN European Championship (-88,6 kg)

== Mixed martial arts record ==
Professional record breakdown
29 matches	17 wins	9 losses
By knockout	9	3
By submission	0	3
By decision	8	3
Draws	2	
No contests	1	

Res.	Record	Opponent	Method	Event	Date	Round	Time	Location	Notes
Loss	17–9–2 (1)	Dalton Rosta	Submission (brabo choke)	PFL 3 (2025)	April 18, 2025	2	3:29	Orlando, Florida, United States	Return to Middleweight. 2025 PFL Middleweight Tournament Quarterfinal.
Win	17–8–2 (1)	Andrew Sanchez	TKO (punches)	PFL 5 (2024)	June 21, 2024	3	4:02	Salt Lake City, Utah, United States	
Loss	16–8–2 (1)	Josh Silveira	TKO (finger injury)	PFL 2 (2024)	April 12, 2024	1	1:40	Las Vegas, Nevada, United States	Light Heavyweight debut.
Loss	16–7–2 (1)	Magomed Magomedkerimov	Submission (guillotine choke)	PFL 10 (2023)	November 24, 2023	3	1:17	Washington, D.C., United States	2023 PFL Welterweight Tournament Final.
Win	16–6–2 (1)	Carlos Leal	Decision (split)	PFL 9 (2023)	August 23, 2023	3	5:00	New York City, New York, United States	2023 PFL Welterweight Tournament Semifinal; Leal missed weight (172 lb).
Win	15–6–2 (1)	Shane Mitchell	KO (spinning wheel kick)	PFL 6 (2023)	June 23, 2023	3	1:35	Atlanta, Georgia, United States	
Win	14–6–2 (1)	Jarrah Al-Silawi	TKO (knee to the body and punches)	PFL 3 (2023)	April 14, 2023	2	2:14	Las Vegas, Nevada, United States	
Win	13–6–2 (1)	Dilano Taylor	Decision (unanimous)	PFL 10 (2022)	November 25, 2022	5	5:00	New York City, New York, United States	Won the 2022 PFL Welterweight Tournament.
Win	12–6–2 (1)	Carlos Leal	Decision (unanimous)	PFL 8 (2022)	August 13, 2022	3	5:00	Cardiff, Wales	2022 PFL Welterweight Tournament Semifinal. Leal was deducted one point in round 3 due to a groin strike.
Win	11–6–2 (1)	Rory MacDonald	Decision (unanimous)	PFL 6 (2022)	July 1, 2022	3	5:00	Atlanta, Georgia, United States	
Win	10–6–2 (1)	Nikolay Aleksakhin	Decision (split)	PFL 3 (2022)	May 6, 2022	3	5:00	Arlington, Texas, United States	
Loss	9–6–2 (1)	Magomed Magomedkerimov	Decision (unanimous)	PFL 7 (2021)	August 13, 2021	3	5:00	Hollywood, Florida, United States	2021 PFL Welterweight Tournament Semifinal.
Win	9–5–2 (1)	Alexey Kunchenko	Decision (unanimous)	PFL 5 (2021)	June 17, 2021	3	5:00	Atlantic City, New Jersey, United States	
NC	8–5–2 (1)	Nikolay Aleksakhin	NC (accidental eye poke)	PFL 2 (2021)	April 29, 2021	2	1:56	Atlantic City, New Jersey, United States	Accidental eye poke rendered Aleksakhin unable to continue.
Draw	8–5–2	Ray Cooper III	Draw (unanimous)	PFL 7 (2019)	October 11, 2019	2	5:00	Las Vegas, Nevada, United States	2019 PFL Welterweight Tournament Quarterfinal. Eliminated via first round tiebreaker.
Loss	8–5–1	Glaico França	TKO (punches)	PFL 4 (2019)	July 11, 2019	3	4:29	Atlantic City, New Jersey, United States	
Win	8–4–1	David Michaud	TKO (body kick and punches)	PFL 1 (2019)	May 9, 2019	1	0:17	Uniondale, New York, United States	Return to Welterweight.
Loss	7–4–1	Abusupiyan Magomedov	Decision (unanimous)	PFL 10 (2018)	October 20, 2018	3	5:00	Washington, D.C., United States	2018 PFL Middleweight Tournament Semifinal.
Draw	7–3–1	Bruno Santos	Draw (majority)	PFL 10 (2018)	October 20, 2018	2	5:00	Washington, D.C., United States	2018 PFL Middleweight Tournament Quarterfinal. Advances via first round tiebreaker.
Win	7–3	Caio Magalhães	KO (head kick and punches)	PFL 7 (2018)	August 30, 2018	1	2:06	Atlantic City, New Jersey, United States	
Loss	6–3	Bruno Santos	Decision (unanimous)	PFL 3 (2018)	July 5, 2018	3	5:00	Washington, D.C., United States	
Win	6–2	Nikos Sokolis	TKO (punches)	Superior Challenge 16	December 2, 2017	1	3:43	Stockholm, Sweden	Welterweight bout.
Win	5–2	David Round	KO (head kick)	Superior Challenge 14	October 8, 2016	1	0:41	Stockholm, Sweden	Catchweight (176 lb) bout.
Loss	4–2	Zauri Maisuradze	TKO (punches)	Scandinavian Fight Nights 1	June 4, 2016	1	N/A	Stockholm, Sweden	
Win	4–1	Karol Linowski	Decision (unanimous)	PLMMA 67	May 21, 2016	3	5:00	Łomianki, Poland	Return to Middleweight.
Win	3–1	Carl Booth	TKO (kick to the body and punches)	Superior Challenge 12	May 16, 2015	1	2:07	Malmö, Sweden	Catchweight (176 lb) bout.
Win	2–1	Gábor Boráros	TKO (punches)	International Ring Fight Arena 7	November 22, 2014	2	4:37	Stockholm, Sweden	Welterweight debut.
Loss	1–1	Oskar Piechota	Submission (triangle choke)	International Ring Fight Arena 6	April 5, 2014	2	N/A	Stockholm, Sweden	
Win	1–0	Robert Bryczek	Decision (unanimous)	International Ring Fight Arena 5	October 19, 2013	3	5:00	Stockholm, Sweden	Middleweight debut.

== Muay Thai and kickboxing record ==
Professional Muay Thai and Kickboxing record
Date	Result	Opponent	Event	Location	Method	Round	Time
2012-12-01	Loss	(Canada) Simon Marcus	Muay Thai in America: In Honor of the King	Los Angeles, California, US	KO (left elbow)	3	1:07
2012-10-13	Win	(France) Corentin Jallon	Supremacy League	Stockholm, Sweden	Decision (Unanimous)	5	3:00
Wins the vacant WKN European Oriental Rules Cruiserweight title							
2009-09-26	Loss	(Sweden) Adam Lazarevic	Battle of Sweden II	Stockholm, Sweden	Decision (Split)	5	3:00
Legend: Win Loss Draw/No contest Notes

Amateur Muay Thai and Kickboxing record (incomplete)
Date	Result	Opponent	Event	Location	Method	Round	Time
2012-09-13	Loss	(Russia) Artem Vakhitov	2012 IFMA World Championships, Final	Saint Petersburg, Russia	Decision	4	2:00
Wins the 2012 IFMA World Championships -86 kg/189 lb Silver Medal.
2012-09-11	Win	(Uzbekistan) Jasur Mirzamukhamedov	2012 IFMA World Championships, Semi Finals	Saint Petersburg, Russia	Decision	4	2:00
2012-09-09	Win	(Ukraine) Sergej Papusha	2012 IFMA World Championships, Quarter Finals	Saint Petersburg, Russia	Decision	4	2:00
2010-12-03	Win	(Latvia) Ters Rinalds	2010 IFMA World Championships, Final	Bangkok, Thailand	KO	3	
Wins the 2010 IFMA World Championships B-class -86 kg/189 lb Gold Medal.
2009-08-	Win	(Czech Republic) Ondrej Srubek	2009 ISKA World Championships, Final	Olomouc, Czech Republic			
Wins the 2009 ISKA World Championships Oriental Rules -86 kg/189 lb Gold Medal.
2009-08-	Win	(Czech Republic) Filip Kollar	2009 ISKA World Championships, Final	Olomouc, Czech Republic			
Wins the 2009 ISKA World Championships Low Kick -86 kg/189 lb Gold Medal.
2007-12-	Loss	(Russia) Sergey Bogdan	2007 ISKA World Championships, Final	Coimbra, Portugal	Decision (2:1)	3	2:00
Wins the 2007 WAKO World Championships Full Contact -86 kg/189 lb Silver Medal.
2007-12-	Win	(Latvia) Mairis Briedis	2007 ISKA World Championships, Semifinals	Coimbra, Portugal	Decision (2:1)	3	2:00
2007-11-	Win	(Finland) Teppo Laine	2007 ISKA World Championships, Quarterfinals	Coimbra, Portugal	Decision (3:0)	3	2:00
2007-11-	Win	(Poland) Bogumil Polonski	2007 ISKA World Championships, First Round	Coimbra, Portugal	Decision (2:1)	3	2:00
Legend: Win Loss Draw/No contest Notes

== See also ==
- List of current PFL fighters
- List of male mixed martial artists
