= PFL 1 (2019) =

Professional Fighters League MMA event in 2019

- The poster for PFL 1
- Promotion: Professional Fighters League
- Date: May 9, 2019
- Venue: Nassau Coliseum
- City: Uniondale, New York

Event chronology
PFL 11	PFL 1	PFL 2

The PFL 1 mixed martial arts event for the 2019 season of the Professional Fighters League was held on May 9, 2019, at the Nassau Coliseum in Uniondale, New York. This was the first regular season event of the tournament and included fights in the welterweight and women's lightweight divisions.

== Background ==
Kayla Harrison was originally scheduled to face Svetlana Khautova in the main event. However, on May 6, it was announced that Khautova had pulled out of the bout due to injury and was replaced by Larissa Pacheco.

== Results ==
Main Card (ESPN 2)
Weight class				Method	Round	Time	Notes
Women's Lightweight	Kayla Harrison	def.	Larissa Pacheco	Decision (unanimous) (30-25, 30-27, 30-27)	3	5:00
Welterweight	Magomed Magomedkerimov	def.	John Howard	Submission (guillotine choke)	1	4:54
Welterweight	Ray Cooper III	def.	Zane Kamaka	Submission (rear-naked choke)	2	4:29
Women's Lightweight	Sarah Kaufman	def.	Morgan Frier	Submission (arm-triangle choke)	1	2:22
Welterweight	Sadibou Sy	def.	David Michaud	TKO (liver kick and punches)	1	0:17
Preliminary card (ESPN+)
Welterweight	Handesson Ferreira	def.	Bojan Veličković	Decision (unanimous) (30-27, 30-27, 30-27)	3	5:00
Women's Lightweight	Bobbi-Jo Dalziel	def.	Genah Fabian	Decision (unanimous) (30-27, 29-28, 29-28)	3	5:00
Welterweight	Glaico França	def.	Gamzat Khiramagomedov	Submission (rear-naked choke)	1	4:06
Welterweight	Chris Curtis	def.	André Fialho	TKO (punches)	3	4:17
Women's Lightweight	Roberta Samad	def.	Moriel Charneski	Decision (unanimous) (30-27, 30-27, 30-27)	3	5:00

== Standings After Event ==
The PFL points system is based on results of the match. The winner of a fight receives 3 points. If the fight ends in a draw, both fighters will receive 1 point. The bonus for winning a fight in the first, second, or third round is 3 points, 2 points, and 1 point respectively. The bonus for winning in the third round requires a fight be stopped before 4:59 of the third round. No bonus point will be awarded if a fighter wins via decision. For example, if a fighter wins a fight in the first round, then the fighter will receive 6 total points. A decision win will result in three total points. If a fighter misses weight, the opponent (should they comply with weight limits) will receive 3 points due to a walkover victory, regardless of winning or losing the bout; if the non-offending fighter subsequently wins with a stoppage, all bonus points will be awarded.

=== Welterweight ===
Fighter	Wins	Draws	Losses	1st	2nd	3rd	Total Points (Note: The eight fighters with most points advance to the playoffs)
Magomed Magomedkerimov	1	0	0	1	0	0	6
Sadibou Sy	1	0	0	1	0	0	6
Glaico Franca	1	0	0	1	0	0	6
Ray Cooper III	1	0	0	0	1	0	5
Chris Curtis	1	0	0	0	0	1	4
Handesson Ferreira	1	0	0	0	0	0	3
John Howard	0	0	1	0	0	0	0
Zane Kamaka	0	0	1	0	0	0	0
David Michaud	0	0	1	0	0	0	0
Bojan Veličković	0	0	1	0	0	0	0
Gamzat Khiramagomedov	0	0	1	0	0	0	0
André Fialho	0	0	1	0	0	0	0

=== Women's Lightweight ===
Fighter	Wins	Draws	Losses	1st	2nd	3rd	Total Points (Note: The four fighters with most points advance to the playoffs)
Sarah Kaufman	1	0	0	1	0	0	6
Roberta Samad	1	0	0	0	0	0	3
Kayla Harrison	1	0	0	0	0	0	3
Bobbi-Jo Dalziel	1	0	0	0	0	0	3
Genah Fabian	0	0	1	0	0	0	0
Moriel Charneski	0	0	1	0	0	0	0
Morgan Frier	0	0	1	0	0	0	0
Larissa Pacheco	0	0	1	0	0	0	0

== See also ==
- List of PFL events
- List of current PFL fighters
