= Magomed Magomedkerimov =

Russian mixed martial artist

- Born: Magomed Magomedkerimov; January 10, 1990 (age 36); Agvali, Dagestan ASSR, Russian SFSR, Soviet Union
- Native name: Магомед Магомедкеримов
- Nationality: Russian
- Height: 6 ft 1 in (1.85 m)
- Weight: 170 lb (77 kg; 12 st 2 lb)
- Division: Middleweight; Welterweight
- Reach: 73 in (185 cm)
- Fighting out of: Makhachkala, Russia
- Team: American Top Team
- Years active: 2008–2023

Mixed martial arts record
- Total: 41
- Wins: 35
- By knockout: 13
- By submission: 10
- By decision: 12
- Losses: 6
- By knockout: 1
- By submission: 3
- By decision: 2

Other information
- Mixed martial arts record from Sherdog

Magomed Malachevich Magomedkerimov (Russian: Магомед Малачевич Магомедкеримов; born 1 October 1990) is a Russian professional mixed martial artist who competed in the Welterweight division of Professional Fighters League (PFL).

== Early life ==
Magomed was born in the small Dagestani village of Agvali, with a population of just over 2,000. While in school, he trained in pankration, hand-to-hand combat, and Muay Thai, sports popular in the region. By graduation, he was determined to pursue a career in sports. At 17, he moved to Makhachkala and entered the Sports and Coaching Faculty at the Dagestan State Pedagogical University (DGPU). The following year, he began competing in various tournaments, including world championships.

With a solid foundation in pankration and striking disciplines, Magomedkerimov launched his professional MMA career in 2008. He also competed in world pankration championships in Portugal and Bulgaria, the Russian hand-to-hand combat championship, and the Kudo and Muay Thai championships in Dagestan. By 2010, he had secured three World Championship wins, one European title, a Eurasian Championship title, and several national and regional championships. In MMA, he won two out of his first three fights.

Magomed's native language is Avar, and he is also fluent in Russian. He graduated from DGPU in 2011 with a degree in Sports and Coaching.

== Mixed martial arts career ==
=== Early career ===
Magomed had his first professional fight against Vitaliy Kalynyuk at Trophy Feira 14, which took place on August 22, 2008, which he won via armbar in the first round. Two years later, in November 2010, Magomed fought Viktor Kuzmenko at M-1: Ukrainian Selection 2010 and won the fight with a rear naked choke. Later that same month, at ProFC- Union Nation Cup 10, Magomed faced Taras Pikhnyuk but lost the bout via a heel hook submission.

Since 2011, Magomed began devoting all his attention to developing a career in MMA. At first, he fought in local leagues, sometimes traveling outside the republic, and adding victories over Anatoly Tokov at League S-70: First Round, Gontarev Evgeny and others to his credit. And when his record was 10 wins and only 3 losses, the leaders of Fight Nights drew attention to the fighter. Having spent only one fight there against a little-known Brazilian, Magomedkerimov receives an invitation to the ACB, where he took part in the Grand Prix.

=== Absolute Championship Berkut ===
In the first round of the ACA Welterweight Grand Prix on March 9, 2014 at Absolute Championship Berkut - Grand Prix Berkut 2, Magomed faced Islam Yashaev, winning the bout 15 seconds into the bout due to doctor stoppage. In the Quarter-Finals, he would face Ibrahim Tibilov at Absolute Championship Berkut - Grand Prix Berkut 5, winning via unanimous decision, then winning his semi-final bout at Absolute Championship Berkut - Grand Prix Berkut 7 against Danyar Babakulov, winning by a second round TKO stoppage.

In the finals, Magomed faced Beslan Isaev on June 22, 2014 at Absolute Championship Berkut - Grand Prix Berkut 9, losing the bout via split decision.

=== Post ACB ===
After leaving ACB having failed to win the Grand Prix, Magomedkerimov garnered a 3-1 record on the regional scene, winning two of those bouts by first round submission, with the only loss being to future ONE Middleweight World Champion Vitaly Bigdash at ProFC 57 on March 29, 2015, getting submitted in the third round via rear-naked choke.

=== World Series of Fighting ===
At the end of 2016, he signs a contract with the WSOF. However, having one performance there against Bobby Cooper, and winning by a split decision of the judges, WSOF starts having problems and the company is bought out by new owners who are in no hurry to renew the contract with Magomed. Due to these delays, he was idle for almost 2 years, and as a result, he still got the opportunity to play in the league, only by that time it had been renamed the PFL.

=== Professional Fighters League ===
==== 2018 season ====
Magomed made his PFL debut on July 5, 2018, at PFL 3 against Herman Terrado, choking out Terrado at the end of the first round via rear-naked choke.

In his sophomore performance on August 16, 2018, at PFL 6, Magomed faced Bojan Veličkovic, winning the bout via unanimous decision and securing a spot in the playoffs.

On October 20, 2018, Magomedkerimov faced Pavel Kusch at PFL 10. He won the fight via unanimous decision to advance to the semifinals of the playoffs. In the semifinals, Magomedkerimov defeated Bojan Veličkovic in a rematch via technical knockout in the second round to advance to the Welterweight finals.

Magomedkerimov faced Ray Cooper III in the finals at PFL 11 on December 31, 2018. Magomed won the fight via a guillotine choke submission in the second round. In the process, he won the 2018 PFL Welterweight Tournament and $1 million dollar prize.

==== 2019 season ====
To start off the 2019 season on May 9, 2019 at PFL 1, Magomed faced John Howard, winning the bout via guillotine choke at the end of the first round.

In the second regular season bout Magomedkerimov faced Chris Curtis at PFL 4 on July 11, 2019. He won the fight via unanimous decision and advanced to the playoffs.

In the quarterfinals Magomedkerimov faced Curtis in a rematch at PFL 7 on October 11, 2019. Again he won the bout via unanimous decision, However, after their bout Magomedkerimov fell ill.

==== 2021 season ====
Magomedkerimov was scheduled to face João Zeferino on April 29, 2021 at PFL 2, however he was forced to pull out of the bout for unknown reasons.

Magomed faced Curtis Millinder at PFL 5 on June 17, 2021. Magomed won bout via ezekiel choke submission in the first round.

Magomedkerimov was rescheduled against João Zeferino in a Semi-Final match-up at PFL 7 on August 13, 2021, however Zeferino had to pull out and Sadibou Sy took his place. He won the bout via unanimous decision and advanced to the finals.

In finals, Magomed faced Ray Cooper III in rematch at PFL 10 on 27 October 2021. He lost bout after getting knocked out in the third round.

==== 2022 season ====
Magomedkerimov was once again rebooked against João Zeferino on May 6, 2022 at PFL 3, however Magomedkerimov pulled out of the bout due to visa issues and was replaced by Dilano Taylor.

For the fourth time, Magomedkerimov was scheduled to face off against João Zeferino at PFL 6 on July 1, 2022. At weigh-ins, Zeferino didn't weigh in and was replaced in his bout against Magomed Magomedkerimov by Dilano Taylor. Magomedkerimov won the bout via second round TKO stoppage.

Magomed faced Gleison Tibau on November 25, 2022 at PFL 10. He won fight via unanimous decision.

==== 2023 season ====
Magomed started off the 2023 season against Ben Egli on April 14, 2023 at PFL 3. He won the bout in the first round, getting a TKO stoppage via head kick.

Magomed faced David Zawada on June 23, 2023 at PFL 6. He won the fight via TKO in the first round.

In the semi-finals, Magomed was originally scheduled to face Magomed Umalatov at PFL 9 on August 23, 2023. However, Umalatov withdrew from the bout and was replaced by Solomon Renfro. Magomed won the fight by unanimous decision.

In the final, Magomed had a rematch with Sadibou Sy on November 24, 2023 at PFL 10. He won the fight via a guillotine choke submission in the third round to become a two-time PFL season champion. His guillotine choke victory, ultimately won the best finish of the year in PFL, as per fans' vote.

==== 2024 season ====
Magomed was scheduled to face Bellator welterweight champion Jason Jackson in a 3 round non-title crossover fight on February 24, 2024 at PFL vs. Bellator. However, Magomed withdrew from the bout due to injury in January 2024 and was replaced by PFL 2019 and 2021 winner Ray Cooper III.

== Championships and accomplishments ==
=== Mixed martial arts ===
- Professional Fighters League
  - 2018 PFL Welterweight Championship
  - 2023 PFL Welterweight Championship
- Fight Matrix
  - 2018 Comeback Fighter of the Year
- MMA Fighting
  - 2023 Third Team MMA All-Star

=== Pankration ===
- Winner of the 14th World Championship in pankration of Visei (Portugal), 2008;
- Winner of the World Championship in pankration in Omsk (Russia), November 13–16, 2009;
- Winner of the World Championship in Pankration in Varna (Bulgaria), October 5–09, 2010;
- Winner of the World Cup in Pankration in Baku (Azerbaijan) - 2009;
- Winner of the European Pankration Championship (Latvia) - 2009.

=== Army hand-to-hand combat ===
- Winner of the Czech Republic in hand-to-hand combat - 2008;
- Winner of the international tournament in hand-to-hand fighting, the Cup of “Kasptaysky Boksi” - 2008

=== Other ===
- Winner of the Thai Championship in Thai boxing - 2008;
- Winner of the Kudo EP Championship - 2008;
- Winner of the Eurasia hand-to-hand championship - 2009

== Personal life ==
Magomed is married and has two sons.

== Mixed martial arts record ==
Professional record breakdown
41 matches	35 wins	6 losses
By knockout	13	1
By submission	10	3
By decision	12	2

Res.	Record	Opponent	Method	Event	Date	Round	Time	Location	Notes
Win	35–6	Sadibou Sy	Submission (guillotine choke)	PFL 10 (2023)	November 24, 2023	3	1:17	Washington, D.C., United States	Won the 2023 PFL Welterweight Tournament.
Win	34–6	Solomon Renfro	Decision (unanimous)	PFL 9 (2023)	August 23, 2023	3	5:00	New York City, New York, United States	2023 PFL Welterweight Tournament Semifinal.
Win	33–6	David Zawada	TKO (punches)	PFL 6 (2023)	June 23, 2023	1	3:54	Atlanta, Georgia, United States	
Win	32–6	Ben Egli	TKO (head kick)	PFL 3 (2023)	April 14, 2023	1	1:03	Las Vegas, Nevada, United States	
Win	31–6	Gleison Tibau	Decision (unanimous)	PFL 10 (2022)	November 25, 2022	3	5:00	New York City, New York, United States	Catchweight (175 lb) bout.
Win	30–6	Dilano Taylor	TKO (punches)	PFL 6 (2022)	July 1, 2022	2	3:26	Atlanta, Georgia, United States	
Loss	29–6	Ray Cooper III	KO (punches)	PFL 10 (2021)	October 27, 2021	3	3:02	Hollywood, Florida, United States	2021 PFL Welterweight Tournament Final.
Win	29–5	Sadibou Sy	Decision (unanimous)	PFL 7 (2021)	August 13, 2021	3	5:00	Hollywood, Florida, United States	2021 PFL Welterweight Tournament Semifinal.
Win	28–5	Curtis Millender	Submission (Ezekiel choke)	PFL 5 (2021)	June 17, 2021	1	1:57	Atlantic City, New Jersey, United States	
Win	27–5	Chris Curtis	Decision (unanimous)	PFL 7 (2019)	October 11, 2019	3	5:00	Las Vegas, Nevada, United States	2019 PFL Welterweight Tournament Quarterfinal.
Win	26–5	Chris Curtis	Decision (unanimous)	PFL 4 (2019)	July 11, 2019	3	5:00	Atlantic City, New Jersey, United States	
Win	25–5	John Howard	Submission (guillotine choke)	PFL 1 (2019)	May 9, 2019	1	4:54	Uniondale, New York, United States	
Win	24–5	Ray Cooper III	Submission (guillotine choke)	PFL 11 (2018)	December 31, 2018	2	2:18	New York City, New York, United States	Won the 2018 PFL Welterweight Tournament.
Win	23–5	Bojan Veličković	TKO (punches)	PFL 10 (2018)	October 20, 2018	2	3:13	Washington, D.C., United States	2018 PFL Welterweight Tournament Semifinal.
Win	22–5	Pavel Kusch	Decision (unanimous)	PFL 10 (2018)	October 20, 2018	2	5:00	Washington, D.C., United States	2018 PFL Welterweight Tournament Quarterfinal.
Win	21–5	Bojan Veličković	Decision (unanimous)	PFL 6 (2018)	August 16, 2018	3	5:00	Atlantic City, New Jersey, United States	
Win	20–5	Herman Terrado	Technical Submission (rear-naked choke)	PFL 3 (2018)	July 5, 2018	1	4:54	Washington, D.C., United States	
Win	19–5	Bobby Cooper	Decision (split)	WSOF 33	October 7, 2016	3	5:00	Kansas City, Missouri, United States	
Win	18–5	Artem Shokalo	Decision (unanimous)	Kunlun Fight: Cage Fight Series 4	October 4, 2015	3	5:00	Astana, Kazakhstan	Middleweight bout.
Win	17–5	Sayfulla Yakubov	Submission (north-south choke)	Derbent FC 4	June 25, 2015	1	4:36	Derbent, Russia	Return to Welterweight.
Loss	16–5	Vitaly Bigdash	Submission (rear-naked choke)	ProFC 57: New Era	March 29, 2015	3	4:20	Rostov-on-Don, Russia	
Win	16–4	Khasankhon Baratov	Submission (arm-triangle choke)	Octagon Fighting Sensation 2	October 17, 2014	1	1:23	Yaroslavl, Russia	Return to Middleweight.
Loss	15–4	Beslan Isaev	Decision (split)	ACB 9	June 22, 2014	3	5:00	Grozny, Russia	2014 ACB Welterweight Grand Prix Final.
Win	15–3	Danyar Babakulov	TKO (punches)	ACB 7	May 18, 2014	2	1:57	Grozny, Russia	2014 ACB Welterweight Grand Prix Semifinal.
Win	14–3	Ibragim Tibilov	Decision (unanimous)	ACB 5	April 6, 2014	3	5:00	Grozny, Russia	2014 ACB Welterweight Grand Prix Quarterfinal.
Win	13–3	Islam Yashaev	TKO (doctor stoppage)	ACB 2	March 9, 2014	1	0:15	Grozny, Russia	2014 ACB Welterweight Grand Prix Round of 16.
Win	12–3	Weguimar Xavier	TKO (liver shot)	Fight Nights Global 22	December 7, 2014	2	2:20	Moscow, Russia	Return to Welterweight.
Win	11–3	Sayfulla Yakubov	Submission (north-south choke)	Way Of The Warrior 3	May 31, 2013	1	N/A	Tambov, Russia	
Win	10–3	Nikolay Karpachov	TKO (punches)	Emperor Fighting Championship 3	May 26, 2013	1	1:19	Yaroslavl, Russia	Return to Middleweight.
Win	9–3	Evgeny Gontarev	KO (punch)	Fight Riot 1	January 25, 2013	1	2:26	Voronezh, Russia]	Welterweight debut.
Win	8–3	Thiago Vella	TKO (punches)	Abu Dhabi Warriors 1	November 2, 2012	1	4:21	Abu Dhabi, United Arab Emirates	
Loss	7–3	Adam Khaliev	Decision (unanimous)	S-70: Plotforma Cup 2012	August 11, 2012	3	5:00	Sochi, Russia	S-70 Middleweight Tournament Final.
Win	7–2	Sergey Faustov	Submission (guillotine choke)	Derbent FC 3	July 13, 2012	1	3:30	Magaramkent, Russia	
Win	6–2	Stanislav Molodtsov	Decision (split)	S-70: Russian Grand Prix 2011 (Stage 4)	May 25, 2012	3	5:00	Moscow, Russia	S-70 Middleweight Tournament Semifinal.
Win	5–2	Anatoly Tokov	KO (punch)	S-70: Russian Grand Prix 2011 (Stage 1)	December 22, 2011	1	1:07	Volgograd, Russia	S-70 Middleweight Tournament Quarterfinal.
Loss	4–2	Bakhtiyar Abbasov	Submission (rear-naked choke)	ProFC 33	September 26, 2011	2	4:20	Derbent, Russia	ProFC Middleweight Tournament Final.
Win	4–1	Ratmir Karatsukov	TKO (punches)	ProFC 33	September 26, 2011	1	4:50	Derbent, Russia	ProFC Middleweight Tournament Semifinal.
Win	3–1	Sergey Shilov	KO (punches)	Pankration Cup Of Call 2011	February 12, 2011	2	0:47	Omsk, Russia	
Loss	2–1	Taras Pikhunyk	Submission (heel hook)	ProFC 20	November 21, 2010	1	3:25	Yerevan, Armenia	
Win	2–0	Viktor Kuzmenko	Submission (rear-naked choke)	M-1: Ukrainian Selection 2010	November 6, 2010	1	1:25	Kiev, Ukraine	
Win	1–0	Vitaly Kalynyuk	Submission (armbar)	Trofeu Feira 14	August 22, 2008	1	2:50	Viseu, Portugal	Middleweight debut.

== Freestyle wrestling record ==
Freestyle matches
Res.	Record	Opponent	Score	Date	Event	Location
Loss	0–1	(United States) Pat Downey	Pinfall	October 23, 2026	RAF 14	(United States) Las Vegas, Nevada

== See also ==
- List of male mixed martial artists
