= Ray Cooper III =

American mixed martial arts fighter (born 1993)

- Born: Raynald Cooper III; February 7, 1993 (age 33); Pearl City, Hawaii, U.S.
- Other names: Bradda Boy
- Height: 5 ft 7 in (1.70 m)
- Weight: 182 lb (83 kg; 13.0 st)
- Division: Middleweight (2023–present); Welterweight (2016–2022); Lightweight (2012–2016)
- Reach: 70 in (178 cm)
- Stance: Orthodox
- Fighting out of: Pearl City, Hawaii, U.S.
- Team: 808 Fight Team; Lion of Judah
- Years active: 2011–present

Mixed martial arts record
- Total: 42
- Wins: 27
- By knockout: 18
- By submission: 7
- By decision: 2
- Losses: 14
- By knockout: 4
- By submission: 5
- By decision: 5
- Draws: 1

Other information
- Mixed martial arts record from Sherdog

Raynald Cooper III (born February 7, 1993) is an American mixed martial artist who competes in the Middleweight division. A professional competitor since 2012, Cooper is most notable for his time in the Professional Fighters League (PFL), where he is a two-time Welterweight champion.

== Early life ==
Born and raised in Pearl City, Hawaii, Cooper got into many fights in the schoolyard, beginning to wrestle at the age of six and trained under the tutelage of his father, Ray Cooper Jr., a professional fighter. In Hawaii, Cooper was a three-time state champion wrestler and two-time Oahu Interscholastic Association champion, winning his last championship at 173 lbs. Upon graduating at the age of 18, he began his career in professional MMA, turning down a college scholarship to continue wrestling. Starting to train with his uncles Ronald Jhun and David “Kawika” Pa’aluhi, also fellow former fighters, and his father, Cooper was the first Cooper sibling, 6 of them in total, to skip college.

== Mixed martial arts career ==
=== Early career ===
Cooper began competing as an amateur in 2011, compiling a record of 3-0 before turning professional in 2012. He competed in promotions King of the Cage, Gladiator Challenge, X-1 and PXC. He compiled a record of 13-5 before being signed by the Professional Fighters League.

=== Professional Fighters League ===
On July 5, 2018, Cooper made his PFL debut at PFL 3 defeating former Strikeforce Middleweight Champion Jake Shields via technical knockout in the second round.

On August 16, 2018, Cooper defeated Pavel Kusch at PFL 6 in 18 seconds of the first round advancing to the playoffs.

On October 20, 2018, Cooper faced Jake Shields in a rematch at PFL 10. He won the fight via technical knockout in the first round to advance to the semifinals of the playoffs. In the semifinals, Cooper defeated Handesson Ferreira in a rematch via technical knockout to advance to the Welterweight finals.

Cooper faced Magomed Magomedkerimov in the finals at PFL 11 on December 31, 2018. Cooper lost the fight via a guillotine choke submission in the second round. Cooper said of the fight, “I left my neck out too much. I thought I was winning that fight, you know, I was pressing the action. I just left my neck out. He has some slick guillotines, he has some long arms."

Cooper re-entered the welterweight tournament in 2019, facing his cousin, Zane Kamaka on May 9, 2019 at PFL 1. He won the bout via rear-naked choke in the second round.

On July 11, 2019 at PFL 4, he faced John Howard, losing the bout after getting knocked out in the first round.

He faced Sadibou Sy in the quarterfinals at PFL 7 on October 11, 2019. The fight ended in a draw with Cooper advancing. In the semifinals at the same event, he faced Chris Curtis and won by knockout in the second round. Cooper faced David Michaud in the finals at PFL 10 on December 31, 2019. He won the fight via TKO in the second round to win the 2019 PFL Welterweight Tournament.

Cooper faced Jason Ponet on April 29, 2021 at PFL 2 as the start of the 2021 PFL Welterweight tournament. He won the bout with an arm-triangle choke in the first round.

Cooper faced Nikolay Aleksakhin at PFL 5 on June 17, 2021. He won the bout via unanimous decision.

Cooper faced Rory MacDonald in the Semifinals off the Welterweight tournament on August 13, 2021 at PFL 7. He won the bout via unanimous decision.

Cooper rematched Magomed Magomedkerimov in the Finals of the Welterweight tournament on 27 October 2021 at PFL 10. Cooper had previously faced Magomedkerimov in the finals of the 2018 tournament, losing the bout via guillotine in the second round. He won the bout this time tho via knockout in the third round, winning the 2021 PFL Welterweight Tournament and another $1 million dollar prize.

Cooper was scheduled to face Magomed Umalatov on May 6, 2022 at PFL 3. Umalatov would pull out of the bout and be replaced by former LFA Welterweight Champion Carlos Leal. At weigh-ins, Ray Cooper III missed weight for the bouts, weighing in at 176.4 pounds, 5.4 pounds over the welterweight non-title fight limit.He was fined 20 percent of their purses, ineligible to win playoff points, given a walkover loss, and was penalized one point in the standings In an upset, Cooper lost the bout via unanimous decision.

Cooper faced Brett Cooper on July 1, 2022 at PFL 6. He won the bout via TKO stoppage 24 seconds into the bout.

Cooper made his middleweight debut against Derek Brunson on November 24, 2023 at PFL 10. At weigh-ins, Cooper came in at 186.8 pounds, .8 pounds over the limit, leading him to being fined a percentage of his purse which went to Brunson and the bout was held at a catchweight. Cooper lost the fight by unanimous decision.

Returning to welterweight, Cooper replaced PFL welterweight champion Magomed Magomedkerimov to face Bellator welterweight champion Jason Jackson in a 182 pound catchweight bout at PFL vs. Bellator on February 24, 2024. He lost the bout by technical knockout in the second round.

Cooper faced Mukhamed Berkhamov on August 23, 2024 at PFL 9. He lost the fight via split decision.

== Personal life ==
Cooper has four younger brothers; Bronson, Blake, Baylen and Makoa. All won wrestling state titles as well, with Blake, now a mixed martial artist, winning three. Both Blake and Baylen wrestled for Warner Pacific University where they were NAIA national champions and All-Americans. He also has a younger sister named Makana who is currently competing in the Hawaii High School Girls Wrestling division. Even Cooper's wife is a former high school state wrestling champion.

Cooper and his wife Kelly have five children, with his last two children being twins.

== Championships and accomplishments ==
- Professional Fighters League
  - 2019 PFL Welterweight Championship
  - 2021 PFL Welterweight Championship
  - Fastest Knockout in PFL History (0:18) vs. Pavel Kusch
- Gladiator Challenge Fights
  - Gladiator Challenge Lightweight Championship (One time)
- Fight Matrix
  - 2018 Most Improved Fighter of the Year
- MMA Sucka
  - 2018 Upset of the Year vs. Jake Shields at PFL 10

== Mixed martial arts record ==
Professional record breakdown
42 matches	27 wins	14 losses
By knockout	18	4
By submission	7	5
By decision	2	5
Draws	1	

Res.	Record	Opponent	Method	Event	Date	Round	Time	Location	Notes
Win	27–14–1	Hidenari Saijo	KO (punch)	Lemino Shooto.10	November 8, 2026	1	2:34	Itoman, Japan	Return to Welterweight.
Win	26–14–1	Gláucio Eliziário	KO (punches)	Gamebred Bareknuckle MMA 9	April 10, 2026	1	2:18	Santo Domingo, Dominican Republic	Gamebred FC Lightweight Grand Prix Round of 16.
Loss	25–14–1	Fanil Rafikov	Decision (unanimous)	BetCity Fight Nights 132	December 20, 2025	3	5:00	Moscow, Russia	Return to Lightweight.
Loss	25–13–1	Darkhanbek Ergeshov	Submission (rear-naked choke)	Borroka Presents: XFC 53	September 20, 2025	2	3:04	Las Vegas, Nevada, United States	
Loss	25–12–1	Dante Schiro	TKO (elbows and punches)	Tuff-N-Uff 145	June 29, 2025	3	2:20	Las Vegas, Nevada, United States	
Loss	25–11–1	Mukhamed Berkhamov	Decision (split)	PFL 9 (2024)	August 23, 2024	3	5:00	Washington, D.C., United States	Return to Welterweight.
Loss	25–10–1	Jason Jackson	TKO (leg kick and punches)	PFL vs. Bellator	February 24, 2024	2	0:23	Riyadh, Saudi Arabia	Catchweight (182 lb) bout.
Loss	25–9–1	Derek Brunson	Decision (unanimous)	PFL 10 (2023)	November 24, 2023	3	5:00	Washington, D.C., United States	Middleweight debut; Cooper missed weight (186.8 lb).
Win	25–8–1	Brett Cooper	TKO (knees and punches)	PFL 6 (2022)	July 1, 2022	1	0:24	Atlanta, Georgia, United States	
Loss	24–8–1	Carlos Leal	Decision (unanimous)	PFL 3 (2022)	May 6, 2022	3	5:00	Arlington, Texas, United States	Catchweight (176.4 lb) bout; Cooper missed weight.
Win	24–7–1	Magomed Magomedkerimov	KO (punches)	PFL 10 (2021)	October 27, 2021	3	3:02	Hollywood, Florida, United States	Won the 2021 PFL Welterweight Tournament.
Win	23–7–1	Rory MacDonald	Decision (unanimous)	PFL 7 (2021)	August 13, 2021	3	5:00	Hollywood, Florida, United States	2021 PFL Welterweight Tournament Semifinal.
Win	22–7–1	Nikolay Aleksakhin	Decision (unanimous)	PFL 5 (2021)	June 17, 2021	3	5:00	Atlantic City, New Jersey, United States	Catchweight (171.8 lb) bout; Cooper missed weight.
Win	21–7–1	Jason Ponet	Submission (arm-triangle choke)	PFL 2 (2021)	April 29, 2021	1	1:23	Atlantic City, New Jersey, United States	
Win	20–7–1	David Michaud	TKO (punches)	PFL 10 (2019)	December 31, 2019	2	2:56	New York City, New York, United States	Won the 2019 PFL Welterweight Tournament.
Win	19–7–1	Chris Curtis	KO (punch)	PFL 7 (2019)	October 11, 2019	2	0:11	Las Vegas, Nevada, United States	2019 PFL Welterweight Tournament Semifinal.
Draw	18–7–1	Sadibou Sy	Draw (unanimous)	PFL 7 (2019)	October 11, 2019	2	5:00	Las Vegas, Nevada, United States	2019 PFL Welterweight Tournament Quarterfinal.
Loss	18–7	John Howard	KO (punches)	PFL 4 (2019)	July 11, 2019	1	3:23	Atlantic City, New Jersey, United States	
Win	18–6	Zane Kamaka	Submission (rear-naked choke)	PFL 1 (2019)	May 9, 2019	2	4:29	Uniondale, New York, United States	
Loss	17–6	Magomed Magomedkerimov	Submission (guillotine choke)	PFL 11 (2018)	December 31, 2018	2	2:18	New York City, New York, United States	2018 PFL Welterweight Tournament Final.
Win	17–5	Handesson Ferreira	TKO (punches)	PFL 10 (2018)	October 20, 2018	1	2:28	Washington, D.C., United States	2018 PFL Welterweight Tournament Semifinal.
Win	16–5	Jake Shields	TKO (punches)	PFL 10 (2018)	October 20, 2018	1	3:10	Washington, D.C., United States	2018 PFL Welterweight Tournament Quarterfinal.
Win	15–5	Pavel Kusch	TKO (punches)	PFL 6 (2018)	August 16, 2018	1	0:18	Atlantic City, New Jersey, United States	
Win	14–5	Jake Shields	TKO (punches)	PFL 3 (2018)	July 5, 2018	2	2:09	Washington, D.C., United States	
Loss	13–5	Handesson Ferreira	Decision (unanimous)	Capone's Productions: Mid-Pacific 5	November 18, 2017	3	5:00	Honolulu, Hawaii, United States	
Win	13–4	Charles Bennett	TKO (punches)	X-1 World Events 48	August 12, 2017	2	2:48	Honolulu, Hawaii, United States	Defended the X-1 Welterweight Championship.
Win	12–4	Jonathan Pico	Submission (rear-naked choke)	X-1 World Events 46	April 29, 2017	1	3:16	Kahului, Hawaii, United States	
Loss	11–4	Park Jun-yong	Submission (anaconda choke)	Pacific Xtreme Combat 56	March 25, 2017	1	N/A	Hagåtña, Guam	
Win	11–3	Matthew Colquhoun	KO (punch)	X-1 World Events 45	January 28, 2017	1	0:04	Honolulu, Hawaii, United States	Won the vacant X-1 Welterweight Championship.
Win	10–3	Zach Conn	KO (punches)	X-1 World Events 44	September 24, 2016	1	0:12	Honolulu, Hawaii, United States	Welterweight debut.
Win	9–3	Gabe Rivas	KO (punches)	Star Elite Cage Fighting 18	April 29, 2016	1	1:41	Waipahu, Hawaii, United States	
Win	8–3	Josh Drake	Submission (front choke)	Gladiator Challenge: Season's Beatings 2015	November 28, 2015	1	1:06	Rancho Mirage, California, United States	Won the vacant Gladiator Challenge Lightweight Championship.
Win	7–3	Adrian Bartree	KO (punch)	Gladiator Challenge: Showdown	August 15, 2015	1	0:34	Rancho Mirage, California, United States	
Win	6–3	David Douglas	TKO (punches)	Star Elite Cage Fighting 15	August 7, 2015	1	0:27	Waipahu, Hawaii, United States	
Win	5–3	Dave Mazany	Submission (rear-naked choke)	Star Elite Cage Fighting 13	March 20, 2015	2	1:24	Waipahu, Hawaii, United States	
Win	4–3	Jody Carter	TKO (punches)	Gladiator Challenge: Season's Beatings 2014	November 22, 2014	1	1:58	Rancho Mirage, California, United States	
Loss	3–3	Craig Jackson	TKO (punches)	Southside Boxing Club: War on the Valley Isle 3	November 8, 2014	1	2:25	Kahului, Hawaii, United States	
Loss	3–2	Danny Navarro	Submission (guillotine choke)	Gladiator Challenge: Payback	August 30, 2014	1	1:34	San Jacinto, California, United States	
Win	3–1	Nate Harris	Submission (guillotine choke)	Destiny MMA: Na Koa 5	May 3, 2014	1	2:52	Honolulu, Hawaii, United States	Submission of the Night.
Loss	2–1	Joey Gomez	Technical Submission (rear-naked choke)	Destiny MMA: Na Koa 3	April 6, 2013	1	2:21	Honolulu, Hawaii, United States	
Win	2–0	Adam Smith	Submission (rear-naked choke)	Destiny MMA: Na Koa 2	January 19, 2013	1	4:41	Honolulu, Hawaii, United States	
Win	1–0	Kani Correa	KO (punch)	KOTC: Ali'is	July 14, 2012	1	0:08	Honolulu, Hawaii, United States	Lightweight debut.

== See also ==
- List of male mixed martial artists
