= PFL 7 (2019) =

Professional Fighters League mixed martial arts event in 2019

- The poster for PFL 7
- Promotion: Professional Fighters League
- Date: October 11, 2019
- Venue: Mandalay Bay Events Center
- City: Las Vegas, Nevada

Event chronology
PFL 6	PFL 7	PFL 8

The PFL 7 mixed martial arts event for the 2019 season of the Professional Fighters League was held on October 11, 2019, at the Mandalay Bay Events Center in Las Vegas, Nevada.

== Background ==
The event was the seventh of the 2019 season and marked the start of the playoffs for the Welterweight and Women's Lightweight divisions.

Kayla Harrison was initially scheduled to face Genah Fabian at this event. However, Fabian missed weight and was replaced by Bobbi-Jo Dalziel.

== Results ==
Main Card (ESPN2)
Weight class				Method	Round	Time	Notes
Welterweight	David Michaud	def.	Glaico França	Decision (majority) (28-28, 29-28, 29-28)	3	5:00	(Note: Semi-final round bout of the 2019 PFL Welterweight playoffs.)
Welterweight	Ray Cooper III	def.	Chris Curtis	KO (punch)	2	0:11	(Note: Semi-final round bout of the 2019 PFL Welterweight playoffs.)
Women's Lightweight	Kayla Harrison	def.	Bobbi Jo Dalziel	Submission (armbar)	1	3:32	(Note: Semi-final round bout of the 2019 PFL Women's Lightweight playoffs.)
Women's Lightweight	Larissa Pacheco	def.	Sarah Kaufman	Decision (unanimous) (30-27, 30-27, 29-28)	3	5:00	(Note: Semi-final round bout of the 2019 PFL Women's Lightweight playoffs.)
Welterweight	David Michaud	def.	John Howard	Decision (unanimous) (20-18, 20-18, 20-18)	2	5:00	(Note: Quarterfinal round bout of the 2019 PFL Welterweight playoffs.)
Welterweight	Magomed Magomedkerimov	def.	Chris Curtis	Decision (unanimous) (20-17, 20-18, 20-18)	2	5:00	(Note: Quarterfinal round bout of the 2019 PFL Welterweight playoffs.)
Preliminary Card (ESPN+)
Welterweight	Glaico França	def.	André Fialho	Decision (majority) (20-18, 20-18, 19-19)	2	5:00	(Note: Quarterfinal round bout of the 2019 PFL Welterweight playoffs.)
Welterweight	Ray Cooper III	vs.	Sadibou Sy	Draw (unanimous) (19-19, 19-19, 19-19)	2	5:00	(Note: Quarterfinal round bout of the 2019 PFL Welterweight playoffs.)
Welterweight	Nikolay Aleksakhin	def.	Jesse Ronson	TKO (punches)	1	3:37	(Note: 2019 PFL Welterweight playoffs Alternate.)
Featherweight	Brendan Loughnane	def.	Matt Wagy	Decision (unanimous) (30-27, 30-26, 30-27)	3	5:00	(Note: Non-Playoff)

== 2019 PFL Welterweight playoffs ==
Quarterfinals
1	(Brazil) Glaico França	MD 2
8	(Portugal) André Fialho	L
4	(United States) John Howard	L
5	(United States) David Michaud	UD 2
2	(Russia) Magomed Magomedkerimov	UD 2
7	(United States) Chris Curtis	L
3	(Sweden) Sadibou Sy	L
6	(United States) Ray Cooper III	Draw 2

Semifinals
1	(Brazil) Glaico França
5	(United States) David Michaud	MD 3
7	(United States) Chris Curtis*	L
6	(United States) Ray Cooper III	KO 2

Finals
5	(United States) David Michaud	L
6	(United States) Ray Cooper III	TKO 2

*Magomed Magomedkerimov was originally scheduled to face Ray Cooper III but was unable to continue in the tournament. He was replaced by his quarterfinal opponent, Chris Curtis.

Legend
(SD)	(Split decision)
(UD)	(Unanimous decision)
(MD)	(Majority decision)
SUB	Submission
(T)KO	(Technical) knock out
L	Loss

== 2019 PFL Women's Lightweight playoffs ==
Semifinals
1	(Canada) Sarah Kaufman	L
4	(Brazil) Larissa Pacheco	UD 3
2	(United States) Kayla Harrison	SUB 1
5	(Canada) Bobbi Jo Dalziel*	L

Finals
4	(Brazil) Larissa Pacheco	L
2	(United States) Kayla Harrison	UD 5

* Genah Fabian was originally scheduled to face Kayla Harrison but was forced to pull out of the bout. She was replaced by Bobbi Jo Dalziel.

Legend
(SD)	(Split decision)
(UD)	(Unanimous decision)
(MD)	(Majority decision)
SUB	Submission
(T)KO	(Technical) knock out
L	Loss

== See also ==
- List of PFL events
- List of current PFL fighters
