= David Michaud =

American professional mixed martial artist

- Born: David Michaud; November 10, 1988 (age 37); Pine Ridge, South Dakota, United States
- Other names: Bulldawg
- Height: 5 ft 9 in (1.75 m)
- Weight: 170 lb (77 kg; 12 st 2 lb)
- Division: Welterweight; Lightweight
- Reach: 72 in (180 cm)
- Fighting out of: Glendale, Arizona, United States
- Team: MMA Lab
- Years active: 2009-present

Mixed martial arts record
- Total: 24
- Wins: 18
- By knockout: 9
- By submission: 5
- By decision: 4
- Losses: 6
- By knockout: 3
- By submission: 1
- By decision: 2

Other information
- University: South Dakota State University
- Mixed martial arts record from Sherdog

David Michaud (born November 10, 1988) is an American professional mixed martial artist currently competing in the Welterweight division. A professional competitor since 2009, he formerly competed for the Professional Fighters League, Legacy Fighting Alliance, the UFC and Titan FC.

== Background ==
Michaud, who is an Oglala Lakota Native American, was born and raised on the Pine Ridge Indian Reservation in Pine Ridge, South Dakota. Michaud competed in wrestling, football, and baseball at Pine Ridge High School. Michaud won All-State honors in football, was an All-Conference selection in baseball, and in wrestling, Michaud finished first for 189 lbs. his senior season and also had a second-place finish as a sophomore. Overall, he held an overall high school record of 91-19 and went 15-1 during his senior season. Michaud was also the valedictorian of his reservation high school graduating class and held a 4.0. Michaud originally went to South Dakota State University to play football, but eventually turned his attention to wrestling after competing in only two matches his freshman year. Michaud was also a standout academically.

== Mixed martial arts career ==
=== Early career ===
Michaud competed as a Light Heavyweight and Middleweight as an amateur, winning Ring Wars Championships in both divisions and compiling a record of 4-1. He began his amateur career at age 15.

Michaud then made his professional mixed martial arts debut in 2009 competing as a Welterweight in regional promotions across The Dakotas. Michaud compiled a record of 4-0, before auditioning for The Ultimate Fighter in 2012.

=== The Ultimate Fighter ===
Michaud appeared in the first episode of The Ultimate Fighter 16. Michaud lost via submission (arm-triangle choke) against Eddy Ellis during the entry round.

After TUF Michaud returned to the regional scene in The Dakotas, where he was able to string together a three-fight win streak, before being signed by the UFC.

=== Ultimate Fighting Championship ===
Michaud made his promotional debut, as a short notice replacement for an injured Danny Mitchell and faced Li Jingliang at UFC 173. Jingliang defeated Michaud split decision.

Michaud faced Garett Whiteley in a Lightweight bout on December 13, 2014 at UFC on Fox 13. Michaud won the fight via unanimous decision.

Michaud faced Olivier Aubin-Mercier on April 25, 2015 at UFC 186. He lost the fight via submission in the third round and was subsequently released from the promotion.

=== Post UFC ===
Michaud made his first appearance after his UFC release in April 2016 when he faced Chris Hugh at RFA 37. He won the fight via a guillotine choke submission in the first round. However, his streak was halted at Titan FC 39 in June 2016, where he fought Dhiego Lima for the Titan FC Welterweight Championship but lost via unanimous decision.

March 2017 brought a fresh wind as Michaud secured a knockout victory over Cody Wilson at EB: Beatdown 20 in the third round. He continued his winning ways against Jake Lindsey at Legacy Fighting Alliance Fight Night 1 in April 2017, where he won via TKO due to injury in the third round.

Michaud's path had a stumble when he lost to Ciro Rodrigues at Legacy Fighting Alliance 19 in August 2017, via TKO in the first round. He bounced back by defeating Tyler Milner at Sparta Combat League 63 in October 2017 with a submission win via rear-naked choke in the first round.

=== Bellator MMA/Legacy Fighting Alliance ===
A significant career move was announced in July 2018 when Michaud signed a contract with Bellator. He faced Corey Davis at Bellator 204 on August 17, 2018 and won the fight via knockout in the first round. Michaud continued this momentum against Fernando Gonzalez Trevino at Combate Americas- Mexico vs. USA in October 2018, earning a TKO victory in the second round.

Michaud faced future UFC fighter Christian Aguilera on February 2, 2019 at LFA 59. He won the bout via TKO in the second round.

=== Professional Fighters League ===
Michaud made his PFL debut against Sadibou Sy, however it was shortlived as he lost 17 seconds into the bout after a liver kick made him unable to continue. Michaud rebounded with a win over Handesson Ferreira at PFL 4 in July 2019, securing the victory via TKO in the first round. His winning streak continued at PFL 7 in October 2019 where he faced John Howard in the quarterfinals, winning the bout via unanimous decision. In the same event, he also faced Glaico França in the semifinals and won via majority decision. Michaud faced Ray Cooper III in the finals at PFL 10 on December 31, 2019. He lost the fight via TKO in the second round.

Michaud was set to face Rory MacDonald on April 29, 2021 at PFL 2 as the start of the 2021 PFL Welterweight tournament. On April 8, Michaud announced that he had to pull out of the bout due to medicals discovering a congenital heart condition, congenital bicuspid aortic valve with dilated aortic root, which put him at risk of aortic dissection. His future in MMA is also uncertain.

== Mixed martial arts record ==
Professional record breakdown
24 matches	18 wins	6 losses
By knockout	9	3
By submission	5	1
By decision	4	2
Draws	0	

Res.	Record	Opponent	Method	Event	Date	Round	Time	Location	Notes
Loss	18–6	Ray Cooper III	TKO (punches)	PFL 10 (2019)	December 31, 2019	2	2:56	New York City, New York, United States	2019 PFL Welterweight Tournament Final.
Win	18–5	Glaico França	Decision (majority)	PFL 7 (2019)	October 11, 2019	3	5:00	Las Vegas, Nevada, United States	2019 PFL Welterweight Tournament Semifinal.
Win	17–5	John Howard	Decision (unanimous)	PFL 7 (2019)	October 11, 2019	2	5:00	Las Vegas, Nevada, United States	2019 PFL Welterweight Tournament Quarterfinal.
Win	16–5	Handesson Ferreira	TKO (punches)	PFL 4 (2019)	July 11, 2019	1	4:37	Atlantic City, New Jersey, United States	
Loss	15–5	Sadibou Sy	TKO (body kick and punches)	PFL 1 (2019)	May 9, 2019	1	0:17	Uniondale, New York, United States	
Win	15–4	Christian Aguilera	TKO (punches)	LFA 59	February 1, 2019	1	4:14	Phoenix, Arizona, United States	
Win	14–4	Fernando Gonzalez Trevino	TKO (punches)	Combate Americas: Mexico vs. USA	October 13, 2018	2	1:07	Tucson, Arizona, United States	
Win	13–4	Corey Davis	KO (punches)	Bellator 204	August 17, 2018	1	1:42	Sioux Falls, South Dakota, United States	
Win	12–4	Tyler Milner	Submission (rear-naked choke)	Sparta Combat League 63	October 28, 2017	1	2:01	Rapid City, South Dakota, United States	
Loss	11–4	Ciro Rodrigues	TKO (punches)	LFA 19	August 18, 2017	1	1:57	Sioux Falls, South Dakota, United States	
Win	11–3	Jake Lindsey	TKO (injury)	LFA Fight Night 1	April 29, 2017	3	1:14	Sioux Falls, South Dakota, United States	
Win	10–3	Cody Wilson	KO (punch)	EB: Beatdown 20	March 18, 2017	3	0:15	New Town, North Dakota, United States	
Loss	9–3	Dhiego Lima	Decision (unanimous)	Titan FC 39	June 10, 2016	5	5:00	Coral Gables, Florida, United States	For the vacant Titan FC Welterweight Championship.
Win	9–2	Chris Hugh	Submission (guillotine choke)	RFA 37	April 15, 2016	1	1:44	Sioux Falls, South Dakota, United States	
Loss	8–2	Olivier Aubin-Mercier	Submission (rear-naked choke)	UFC 186	April 25, 2015	3	3:24	Montreal, Quebec, Canada	
Win	8–1	Garett Whiteley	Decision (unanimous)	UFC on Fox: dos Santos vs. Miocic	December 13, 2014	3	5:00	Phoenix, Arizona, United States	Lightweight debut.
Loss	7–1	Li Jingliang	Decision (split)	UFC 173	May 24, 2014	3	5:00	Las Vegas, Nevada, United States	
Win	7–0	Carey Vanier	Submission (guillotine choke)	Dakota FC 17	January 11, 2014	1	4:30	Fargo, North Dakota, United States	Catchweight (160 lb) bout.
Win	6–0	Ian Stonehouse	Submission (rear-naked choke)	Victory FC 2	November 2, 2013	2	3:00	Rapid City, South Dakota, United States	
Win	5–0	Mark Scudder	Decision (unanimous)	Victory FC: Rapid City Fight Night 1	June 1, 2013	3	5:00	Rapid City, South Dakota, United States	Catchweight (175 lb) bout.
Win	4–0	Derek Abram	TKO (punches)	Crowbar MMA: Rumble at the Fair	June 25, 2011	1	4:04	Grand Forks, North Dakota, United States	
Win	3–0	Cody Skidmore	TKO (punches)	Fury Fights: Battle in Brookings 8	October 3, 2009	1	0:42	Brookings, South Dakota, United States	
Win	2–0	Bryant Craven	Submission (kimura)	Eminent Domain Productions: Vindication	September 26, 2009	1	1:56	Rapid City, South Dakota, United States	
Win	1–0	Curtis Johnson	TKO (punches)	Fury Fights: Battle in Brookings 7	April 25, 2009	1	0:40	Brookings, South Dakota, United States	Welterweight debut.

== See also ==
- List of male mixed martial artists
