= André Fialho =

Portuguese mixed martial artist

- Born: André Fialho Mensurado; April 7, 1994 (age 32); Cascais, Portugal
- Height: 6 ft 0 in (1.83 m)
- Weight: 170 lb (77 kg; 12 st)
- Division: Welterweight
- Reach: 74 in (188 cm)
- Style: Boxing
- Stance: Orthodox
- Fighting out of: Deerfield Beach, Florida, U.S.
- Team: Kill Cliff FC
- Rank: Purple belt in Brazilian Jiu-Jitsu
- Years active: 2014–present

Mixed martial arts record
- Total: 29
- Wins: 17
- By knockout: 14
- By submission: 1
- By decision: 2
- Losses: 11
- By knockout: 7
- By submission: 1
- By decision: 3
- No contests: 1

Other information
- Mixed martial arts record from Sherdog

André Fialho Mensurado (born April 7, 1994) is a Portuguese mixed martial artist who competes in the Welterweight division. He is the former UAE Warriors champion and has also competed for the Ultimate Fighting Championship (UFC), PFL, Bellator and LFA.

== Background ==
As a teenager, Fialho was interested in football and was also an amateur boxing champion in his native country of Portugal, after being convinced to begin boxing by his father, who was a former boxer and founded his own gym in 2019.

However, after meeting a MMA coach when on holiday in the Algarve, he decided to focus solely on MMA. In 2015 he left for the United States of America in search of his dream, to be a professional MMA fighter.

== Mixed martial arts career ==
=== Bellator MMA ===
After winning 6 fights on the regional circuit, all by finish, Fialho made his Bellator debut against Manuel Meraz on February 26, 2016, at Bellator 150. He won the fight via TKO in just 29 seconds.

In his sophomore performance on May 14, 2016, at Bellator 154, Fialho faced Rick Reger and won the bout via TKO stoppage in the first round.

In his highest profile fight for the promotion, Fialho faced Chidi Njokuani at Bellator 167 on December 3, 2016. He lost the fight via knockout just 21 seconds into the first round.

Fialho faced A.J. Matthews at Bellator 181 on July 14, 2017. After a back-and-forth contest, in which both fighters were able to land significant strikes, hurting their opponent, ultimately Fialho won the bout via split decision.

Fialho was scheduled to face Brennan Ward on October 12, 2018, at Bellator 207. However on September 10, 2018, Ward notified the promotion that he will retire from MMA. Fialho was instead scheduled against Javier Torres. He won the close bout via majority decision.

=== Professional Fighters League ===
Fialho joined the PFL as a tournament replacement for PFL Season 2018 Middleweight Champion Louis Taylor at PFL 1 on May 9, 2019. As a result, he faced Chris Curtis. Fialho lost the bout via third-round knockout.

Fialho fought Glaico França at PFL 7 on October 11, 2019. He lost the bout via majority decision, but França tested positive for stanozolol and so the bout was overturned to a no contest.

=== Legacy Fighting Alliance and XMMA ===
Fialho faced Antonio dos Santos Jr. at LFA 92 on October 2, 2020. He lost the fight via unanimous decision.

Fialho fought former UFC fighter James Vick at XMMA 1 on January 30, 2021. Fialho won the fight by second-round technical knockout.

=== UAE Warriors ===
Fialho completed his time with the company with a 3–0 record. He debuted against Sang Hoon Yoo at UAE Warriors 20, winning the bout via TKO stoppage 18 seconds into the bout. He would then go on to defeat Lincoln Henrique at UAE Warriors 22 on September 4, 2021, collecting another first round TKO. He would then get booked against UFC vet Stefan Sekulic on October 29, 2021, at UAE Warriors 24. He would win the bout via TKO after dropping Sekulic with an elbow in the clinch and then finishing him on the ground.

=== Ultimate Fighting Championship ===
In his debut, Fialho fought Michel Pereira on short notice at UFC 270, on January 22, 2022. He lost the fight by unanimous decision.

Fialho next faced Miguel Baeza on April 16, 2022, at UFC on ESPN: Luque vs. Muhammad 2. He won the fight via technical knockout in round one. The win earned him a Performance of the Night bonus.

Fialho faced Cameron VanCamp on May 7, 2022, at UFC 274. He won the fight by knockout in round one. The win also earned Fialho his second consecutive Performance of the Night bonus award.

Fialho faced Jake Matthews on June 11, 2022, at UFC 275. He lost the bout via knockout in the second round.

Fialho faced Muslim Salikhov on November 19, 2022, at UFC Fight Night 215. He lost the bout via technical knockout in the third round.

Fialho faced Joaquin Buckley on May 20, 2023, at UFC Fight Night 223. He lost the fight via technical knockout in round two.

Fialho faced Tim Means on September 23, 2023, at UFC Fight Night 228. He lost the fight via technical knockout in round three. This fight earned him the Fight of the Night award.

Fialho was released by the UFC in October 2023.

=== Post-UFC ===
Fialho faced Jakhongir Jumaev at UAE Warriors 50 on May 18, 2024 and lost by knockout in the first round.

== Championships & accomplishments ==
=== Mixed martial arts ===
- Ultimate Fighting Championship
  - Fight of the Night (One time) vs. Tim Means
  - Performance of the Night (Two times) vs. Miguel Baeza and Cameron VanCamp
  - Tied for most bouts in a calendar year (5 bouts in 2022)
  - UFC.com Awards
    - 2022: Ranked #10 Newcomer of the Year
- Ice Cage
  - The inaugural Ice Cage Middleweight Champion
- MMA Fighting
  - 2022 First Team MMA All-Star

== Mixed martial arts record ==
Professional record breakdown
| 29 matches | 17 wins | 11 losses |
| By knockout | 14 | 7 |
| By submission | 1 | 1 |
| By decision | 2 | 3 |
| No contests | 1 | |

| Res. | Record | Opponent | Method | Event | Date | Round | Time | Location | Notes |
|---|---|---|---|---|---|---|---|---|---|
| Loss | 17–11 (1) | Brayan Aspegren | Decision (unanimous) | Ice Cage Fighting 8 | September 19, 2026 | 5 | 5:00 | Turku, Finland | Lost the ICF Middleweight Championship. |
| Loss | 17–10 (1) | Jordan Zébo | Submission (rear-naked choke) | Ares FC 42 | July 3, 2026 | 4 | 4:50 | Paris, France | For the Ares FC Welterweight Championship. |
| Win | 17–9 (1) | Olli Santalahti | TKO (retirement) | Ice Cage Fighting 7 | May 16, 2026 | 2 | 2:40 | Tampere, Finland | Middleweight debut. Won the inaugural ICF Middleweight Championship. |
| Loss | 16–9 (1) | Jakhongir Jumaev | KO (punches) | UAE Warriors 50 | May 18, 2024 | 1 | 2:23 | Abu Dhabi, United Arab Emirates | |
| Loss | 16–8 (1) | Tim Means | TKO (punches) | UFC Fight Night: Fiziev vs. Gamrot | September 23, 2023 | 3 | 1:15 | Las Vegas, Nevada, United States | Fight of the Night. |
| Loss | 16–7 (1) | Joaquin Buckley | TKO (head kick) | UFC Fight Night: Dern vs. Hill | May 20, 2023 | 2 | 4:15 | Las Vegas, Nevada, United States | |
| Loss | 16–6 (1) | Muslim Salikhov | TKO (spinning wheel kick and punches) | UFC Fight Night: Nzechukwu vs. Cuțelaba | November 19, 2022 | 3 | 1:03 | Las Vegas, Nevada, United States | |
| Loss | 16–5 (1) | Jake Matthews | KO (punches) | UFC 275 | June 11, 2022 | 2 | 2:24 | Kallang, Singapore | |
| Win | 16–4 (1) | Cameron VanCamp | KO (punch) | UFC 274 | May 7, 2022 | 1 | 2:35 | Phoenix, Arizona, United States | Performance of the Night. |
| Win | 15–4 (1) | Miguel Baeza | TKO (punches) | UFC on ESPN: Luque vs. Muhammad 2 | April 16, 2022 | 1 | 4:39 | Las Vegas, Nevada, United States | Performance of the Night. |
| Loss | 14–4 (1) | Michel Pereira | Decision (unanimous) | UFC 270 | January 22, 2022 | 3 | 5:00 | Anaheim, California, United States | |
| Win | 14–3 (1) | Stefan Sekulić | TKO (elbow and punches) | UAE Warriors 24 | October 29, 2021 | 1 | 1:53 | Abu Dhabi, United Arab Emirates | |
| Win | 13–3 (1) | Lincoln Henrique | KO (punches) | UAE Warriors 22 | September 4, 2021 | 1 | 4:47 | Abu Dhabi, United Arab Emirates | |
| Win | 12–3 (1) | Yoo Sang-hoon | TKO (punches) | UAE Warriors 20 | June 19, 2021 | 1 | 0:18 | Abu Dhabi, United Arab Emirates | |
| Win | 11–3 (1) | James Vick | TKO (punches) | XMMA: Vick vs Fialho | January 30, 2021 | 2 | 2:21 | West Palm Beach, Florida, United States | |
| Loss | 10–3 (1) | Antônio dos Santos Jr. | Decision (unanimous) | LFA 92 | October 2, 2020 | 3 | 5:00 | Park City, Kansas, United States | Catchweight (180 lb) bout. |
| NC | 10–2 (1) | Glaico França | NC (overturned) | PFL 7 (2019) | October 11, 2019 | 2 | 5:00 | Las Vegas, Nevada, United States | 2019 PFL Welterweight Tournament Quarterfinal. Originally a majority decision win for França; overturned after he tested positive for stanozolol. |
| Loss | 10–2 | Chris Curtis | TKO (punches) | PFL 1 (2019) | May 9, 2019 | 3 | 4:17 | Uniondale, New York, United States | |
| Win | 10–1 | Javier Torres | Decision (majority) | Bellator 207 | October 12, 2018 | 3 | 5:00 | Uncasville, Connecticut, United States | Catchweight (177 lb) bout. |
| Win | 9–1 | A.J. Matthews | Decision (split) | Bellator 181 | July 14, 2017 | 3 | 5:00 | Thackerville, Oklahoma, United States | |
| Loss | 8–1 | Chidi Njokuani | TKO (punches) | Bellator 167 | December 3, 2016 | 1 | 0:21 | Thackerville, Oklahoma, United States | Catchweight (175 lb) bout; Njokuani missed weight. |
| Win | 8–0 | Rick Reger | KO (punches) | Bellator 154 | May 14, 2016 | 1 | 2:11 | San Jose, California, United States | |
| Win | 7–0 | Manuel Meraz | KO (punches) | Bellator 150 | February 26, 2016 | 1 | 0:29 | Mulvane, Kansas, United States | |
| Win | 6–0 | Alvaro Sanches | KO (punches) | International Pro Combat 6 | January 26, 2015 | 1 | 0:53 | Estoril, Portugal | |
| Win | 5–0 | Carlos Antonio de Souza | TKO (punches) | Cage Fighters 4 | 30 November 2014 | 1 | 2:31 | Maia, Portugal | |
| Win | 4–0 | Giovanni Diniz | TKO (punches) | Cage Fighters 4 | 30 November 2014 | 1 | 1:00 | Maia, Portugal | |
| Win | 3–0 | Wanderson Silva | TKO (punches) | Cage Fighters 4 | 30 November 2014 | 2 | 1:52 | Maia, Portugal | |
| Win | 2–0 | Nuno Faria | Submission (rear-naked choke) | International Pro Combat 5 | November 2, 2014 | 1 | 3:17 | Estoril, Portugal | |
| Win | 1–0 | Henry Deiby Lima | TKO (punches) | Invictus Pro MMA League 1 | July 27, 2014 | 1 | 3:46 | Estoril, Portugal | |

== See also ==
- List of male mixed martial artists
