= PFL 9 (2023) =

Mixed martial arts event

- The poster for PFL 9
- Promotion: Professional Fighters League
- Date: August 23, 2023
- Venue: The Theater at Madison Square Garden
- City: New York City, New York, United States

Event chronology
PFL 8	PFL 9	PFL Europe 3

PFL 9 was a mixed martial arts event produced by the Professional Fighters League that took place on August 23, 2023, at The Theater at Madison Square Garden in New York City, New York, United States. This will mark off the playoffs for the Lightweight and Welterweight divisions.

== Background ==
The event was headlined by a lightweight playoff bout between Clay Collard facing off against Shane Burgos in an attempt to reach the lightweight final.

Magomed Magomedkerimov was originally scheduled to face Magomed Umalatov at this event. However, Umalatov withdrew from the bout and was replaced by Solomon Renfro.

At weigh-ins, Carlos Leal weighed in at 172 pounds, 1 pound over the Welterweight limit. Leal was fined 20 percent of his purse, which went to his opponent Sy, and started the bout with a one point subtraction. Caldone weighed in at 148.6 pounds, 2.6 pounds over the Featherweight limit, leading him to being fined 20% of his purse which went to his opponent Grimard.

== Results ==
Main card (ESPN / ESPN+)
Weight class				Method	Round	Time	Notes
Lightweight	Clay Collard	def.	Shane Burgos	Decision (unanimous) (29–28, 29–28, 29–28)	3	5:00	(Note: Semi-final bout of the PFL Lightweight playoffs.)
Lightweight	Olivier Aubin-Mercier	def.	Bruno Miranda	TKO (punches)	2	4:41	(Note: Semi-final bout of the PFL Lightweight playoffs.)
Welterweight	Sadibou Sy	def.	Carlos Leal	Decision (split) (28–29, 29–28, 29–28)	3	5:00	(Note: Semi-final bout of the PFL Welterweight playoffs. Leal missed weight (172 lbs))
Welterweight	Magomed Magomedkerimov	def.	Solomon Renfro	Decision (unanimous) (30–27, 30–27, 30–27)	3	5:00	(Note: Semi-final bout of the PFL Welterweight playoffs.)
Lightweight	Biaggio Ali Walsh	def.	Ed Davis	TKO (punches)	2	2:23	(Note: Amateur bout.)
Preliminary card (ESPN+)
Featherweight	Alexei Pergande	def.	Shawn Stefanelli	Decision (unanimous) (30–27, 30–27, 30–27)	3	5:00
Middleweight	Mostafa Rashed Neda	def.	Korey Kuppe	TKO (punches)	1	1:55
Women's Featherweight	Michelle Montague	def.	Abigail Montes	Submission (rear-naked choke)	2	3:38
Featherweight	Abdullah Al-Qahtani	def.	David Zelner	Decision (unanimous) (30–26, 30–26, 30–25)	3	5:00
Featherweight	John Caldone	def.	Nathaniel Grimard	TKO (punches)	1	2:32	(Note: Caldone missed weight (148.6 lbs))

== Playoff brackets ==
=== 2023 PFL Lightweight playoffs ===
Semifinals
1	(United States) Clay Collard	UD
4	(United States) Shane Burgos	3
2	(Canada) Olivier Aubin-Mercier	TKO
3	(Brazil) Bruno Miranda	2

Finals
1	(United States) Clay Collard
2	(Canada) Olivier Aubin-Mercier

=== 2023 PFL Welterweight playoffs ===
Semifinals
1	(Russia) Magomed Magomedkerimov	UD
5	(United States) Solomon Renfro	3
2	(Brazil) Carlos Leal	3
3	(Sweden) Sadibou Sy	SD

Finals
1	(Russia) Magomed Magomedkerimov
3	(Sweden) Sadibou Sy

Legend
(SD)	(Split Decision)
(UD)	(Unanimous Decision)
(MD)	(Majority Decision)
SUB	Submission
(T)KO	(Technical) Knock Out
L	Loss

== See also ==
- List of PFL events
- List of current PFL fighters
