= PFL 7 (2021) =

Professional Fighters League mixed martial arts event in 2021

- The poster for PFL 7
- Promotion: Professional Fighters League
- Date: August 13, 2021
- Venue: Seminole Hard Rock Hotel & Casino Hollywood
- City: Hollywood, Florida, United States

Event chronology
PFL 6	PFL 7	PFL 8

The PFL 7 mixed martial arts event for the 2021 season of the Professional Fighters League was held on August 13, 2021. This was the start of the playoffs for the Welterweight and Lightweight divisions. This event aired on ESPN2, with the prelims on ESPN+.

== Background ==
Rory MacDonald and Ray Cooper III headlined the first PFL playoff card, with the Welterweight and Lightweight playoffs holding their semifinal bouts. MacDonald made his third appearance with PFL cage, going 1-1 in the regular season, with his most recent outing being a highly controversial decision loss to Gleison Tibau. He took on the former PFL champion Cooper, who was 2-0 during the regular season in 2021.

The Lightweight bracket saw UFC and boxing veteran Clay Collard take on Raush Manfio while Loik Radzhabov and Alexander Martinez fought in the other lightweight semifinal.

Featured additions included a lightweight contest include two-time PFL champion Natan Schulte taking on 12-time UFC veteran Olivier Aubin-Mercier, as well as planned bout with Swedish PFL vet Sadibou Sy facing 28-time UFC veteran Gleison Tibau.

On August 4, it was announced that João Zeferino was out of his Semi-Final match-up against Magomed Magomedkerimov, with #5 ranked Sadibou Sy taking his place. Curtis Millender (replacing Sy) was then scheduled to face Gleison Tibau. Natan Schulte was also announced to have been scratched, with Olivier Aubin-Mercier now fighting Darrell Horcher. Lastly, Nikolay Aleksakhin was removed from his bout against Brett Cooper, with Cooper now facing Tyler Hill. On August 12, Millender was announced to have pulled out of the bout against Tibau, so Tibau instead faced Micah Terrill, while Magomed Umalatov faced Leandro Silva.

At weigh-ins, Darrell Horcher and Leandro Silva weighed in at 159.25 and 172.5 pounds, missing weight by 3.25 and 1.5 pounds respectively. The bouts proceeded at catchweight and they were fined 20% of their purses, which went to their opponents Olivier Aubin-Mercier and Magomed Umalatov respectively.

== Results ==
Main Card (ESPN 2)
Weight class				Method	Round	Time	Notes
Welterweight	Ray Cooper III	def.	Rory MacDonald	Decision (unanimous) (30-27, 30-27, 30-27)	3	5:00
Welterweight	Magomed Magomedkerimov	def.	Sadibou Sy	Decision (unanimous) (30-27, 30-27, 30-27)	3	5:00
Lightweight	Raush Manfio	def.	Clay Collard	Decision (unanimous) (29-28, 29-28, 29-28)	3	5:00
Lightweight	Loik Radzhabov	def.	Alexander Martinez	Decision (unanimous) (30-27, 30-27, 29-28)	3	5:00
Preliminary card (ESPN+)
Welterweight	Gleison Tibau	def.	Micah Terrill	Technical Submission (arm-triangle choke)	1	2:18
Catchweight (159.25 lb)	Olivier Aubin-Mercier	def.	Darrell Horcher	Decision (unanimous) (29-28, 30-26, 29-27)	3	5:00
Welterweight	Brett Cooper	def.	Tyler Hill	KO (punches)	1	2:32
Catchweight (172.5 lb)	Magomed Umalatov	def.	Leandro Silva	Decision (unanimous) (29-28, 29-28, 29-28)	3	5:00
Welterweight	Michael Lombardo	def.	Kyron Bowen	TKO (leg kicks)	1	3:42
Lightweight	Elvin Espinoza	def.	Hopeton Stewart	Technical Submission (rear-naked choke)	1	2:45

== 2021 PFL Welterweight playoffs ==
Semifinals
5	(Sweden) Sadibou Sy*	3
4	(Russia) Magomed Magomedkerimov	UD
2	(Canada) Rory MacDonald	3
3	(United States) Ray Cooper III	UD

Finals
4	(Russia) Magomed Magomedkerimov	3
3	(United States) Ray Cooper III	KO

- João Zeferino was originally scheduled to face Magomed Magomedkerimov but was unable to continue in the tournament. He was replaced by #5 ranked Sadibou Sy.

Legend
(SD)	(Split Decision)
(UD)	(Unanimous Decision)
(MD)	(Majority Decision)
SUB	Submission
(T)KO	(Technical) Knock Out
L	Loss

== 2021 PFL Lightweight playoffs ==
Semifinals
1	(Tajikistan) Loik Radzhabov	UD
4	(Paraguay) Alexander Martinez	3
2	(United States) Clay Collard	3
3	(Brazil) Raush Manfio	UD

Finals
1	(Tajikistan) Loik Radzhabov	5
3	(Brazil) Raush Manfio	UD

Legend
(SD)	(Split Decision)
(UD)	(Unanimous Decision)
(MD)	(Majority Decision)
SUB	Submission
(T)KO	(Technical) Knock Out
L	Loss

== See also ==
- List of PFL events
- List of current PFL fighters
