= PFL 6 (2021) =

Professional Fighters League mixed martial arts event in 2021

- The poster for PFL 6
- Promotion: Professional Fighters League
- Date: June 25, 2021
- Venue: Ocean Casino Resort
- City: Atlantic City, New Jersey, United States

Event chronology
PFL 5	PFL 6	PFL 7

The PFL 6 mixed martial arts event for the 2021 season of the Professional Fighters League was held on June 25, 2021. This was the third regular season event of the tournament and included fights in the Heavyweight and women's Lightweight divisions. This event was aired on ESPN2, with the prelims on ESPN+.

== Background ==
The event was headlined by Two-time Olympic gold medalist Kayla Harrison and Cindy Dandois.

The co-main was to be a bout between 2019 Professional Fighters League season Heavyweight Champion Ali Isaev against Renan Ferreira. Ali Isaev was forced to withdraw from the event after not being medically cleared to compete. Stepping in for Isaev to fight Renan Ferreira was PFL newcomer Stuart Austin. Austin however was pulled from the bout for unknown reasons and replaced by returning PFL fighter, Carl Seumanutafa.

A heavyweight bout between Ante Delija and Hatef Moeil was scheduled for this event. However, Moeil had to pull out and was replaced by Chandler Cole.

A bout between heavyweight alternates Klidson Abreu and Jamelle Jones also took place on the card.

A bout between Fabrício Werdum and Brandon Sayles was expected to take place at this event. However, Werdum had to pull out off the bout after suffering injuries from his last bout.

A lightweight bout between former UFC and WEC Lightweight champion Anthony Pettis and undefeated Alexander Martinez was expected to take place at PFL 4. However, Pettis withdrew due to illness and Martinez was scheduled to face Natan Schulte. Schulte's opponent Raush Manfio - who replaced an injured Mikhail Odintsov - faced Pettis at this event.

Movlid Khaybulaev and Lance Palmer were scheduled bouts at PFL 4 against Sheymon Moraes and Jesse Stirn respectively. However, both were pulled from their bouts and rescheduled against each other at this event.

At weigh-ins, Olena Kolesnyk came in at 157.6 lb, 1.6 pounds heavy for her lightweight bout against Larissa Pacheco. As a result, Kolesnyk was docked one point, fined 20 percent of her purse, lost one playoff point and was deemed ineligible to win playoff points should she prevail. Pacheco automatically earned three playoff points, with the ability to gain more by scoring a finish.

== Results ==
Main Card (ESPN 2)
Weight class				Method	Round	Time	Notes
Women's Lightweight	Kayla Harrison	def.	Cindy Dandois	Submission (armbar)	1	4:44
Lightweight	Raush Manfio	def.	Anthony Pettis	Decision (split) (28-29, 29-28, 29-28)	3	5:00
Featherweight	Movlid Khaybulaev	def.	Lance Palmer	Decision (unanimous) (29-28, 29-28, 29-28)	3	5:00
Heavyweight	Denis Goltsov	def.	Brandon Sayles	TKO (punches)	3	1:24
Preliminary card (ESPN+)
Heavyweight	Bruno Cappelozza	def.	Muhammed DeReese	TKO (punch and head kick)	1	2:21
Women's Lightweight	Larissa Pacheco	def.	Olena Kolesnyk	KO (punch)	1	4:48
Heavyweight	Ante Delija	def.	Chandler Cole	TKO (punches)	1	4:39
Women's Lightweight	Genah Fabian	def.	Julija Pajić	TKO (punches)	2	4:16
Heavyweight	Renan Ferreira	def.	Carl Seumanutafa	Decision (unanimous) (30-26, 30-26, 30-26)	3	5:00
Women's Lightweight	Taylor Guardado	def.	Laura Sanchez	Decision (unanimous) (30-27, 30-27, 30-27)	3	5:00
Women's Lightweight	Mariana Morais	def.	Kaitlin Young	Decision (split) (30-27, 28-29, 29-28)	3	5:00
Heavyweight	Jamelle Jones	def.	Klidson Abreu	KO (punches)	1	1:43

== Standings After Event ==
The PFL points system is based on results of the match. The winner of a fight receives 3 points. If the fight ends in a draw, both fighters will receive 1 point. The bonus for winning a fight in the first, second, or third round is 3 points, 2 points, and 1 point respectively. The bonus for winning in the third round requires a fight be stopped before 4:59 of the third round. No bonus point will be awarded if a fighter wins via decision. For example, if a fighter wins a fight in the first round, then the fighter will receive 6 total points. A decision win will result in three total points. If a fighter misses weight, the opponent (should they comply with weight limits) will receive 3 points due to a walkover victory, regardless of winning or losing the bout, with the fighter who missed weight being deducted 1 standings point; if the non-offending fighter subsequently wins with a stoppage, all bonus points will be awarded. A fighter who was unable to compete for any reason, will receive a 1-point penalty (-1 point in the standings). The fighters who made weight will not receive a walkover, but will earn points and contracted purse amounts based on their performance in the altered matchup.

=== Heavyweight ===
Fighter	Wins	Draws	Losses	NCs	1st	2nd	3rd	Total Points
♛ (Brazil) Bruno Cappelozza	2	0	0	0	2	0	0	12
♛ (Russia) Denis Goltsov	2	0	0	0	1	0	1	10
♛ (Croatia) Ante Delija	1	0	1	0	1	0	0	6
♛ (United States) Jamelle Jones	1	0	0	0	1	0	0	6
E (United States) Brandon Sayles	1	0	1	0	0	1	0	5
E (Brazil) Renan Ferreira	1	0	0	0	0	0	0	4
E (Brazil) Fabricio Werdum	0	0	0	1	0	0	0	1
E (United States) Muhammed DeReese	0	0	2	0	0	0	0	0
E (Brazil) Klidson Abreu	0	0	1	0	0	0	0	0
E (Samoa) Carl Seumanutafa	0	0	1	0	0	0	0	0
E (United States) Chandler Cole	0	0	1	0	0	0	0	0
E (Nigeria) Mohammed Usman	0	0	1	0	0	0	0	0

=== Lightweight ===
Fighter	Wins	Draws	Losses	1st	2nd	3rd	Total Points
♛ (Tajikistan) Loik Radzhabov	1	0	1	1	0	0	6
♛ (United States) Clay Collard	2	0	0	0	0	0	6
♛ (Brazil) Raush Manfio	2	0	0	0	0	0	6
♛ (Paraguay) Alexander Martinez	1	0	1	0	0	0	3
E (Brazil) Natan Schulte	1	0	1	0	0	0	3
E (Poland) Marcin Held	1	0	1	0	0	0	3
E (Russia) Akhmet Aliev	1	0	1	0	0	0	3
E (Canada) Olivier Aubin-Mercier	1	0	0	0	0	0	2
E (United States) Anthony Pettis	0	0	2	0	0	0	0
E (Brazil) Joilton Lutterbach	0	0	2	0	0	0	-1

=== Women's Lightweight ===
Fighter	Wins	Draws	Losses	1st	2nd	3rd	Total Points
E (Brazil) Larissa Pacheco	2	0	0	2	0	0	12
♛ (United States) Kayla Harrison	2	0	0	2	0	0	12
♛ (New Zealand) Genah Fabian	1	0	0	0	1	0	8
♛ (United States) Taylor Guardado	2	0	0	0	0	0	6
♛ (Brazil) Mariana Morais	1	0	1	0	0	0	3
E (United States) Kaitlin Young	1	0	1	0	0	0	3
E (Belgium) Cindy Dandois	0	0	2	0	0	0	0
E (United States) Laura Sanchez	0	0	2	0	0	0	0
E (Montenegro) Julija Pajić	0	0	2	0	0	0	0
E (Ukraine) Olena Kolesnyk	0	0	2	0	0	0	-1

=== Featherweight ===
Fighter	Wins	Draws	Losses	1st	2nd	3rd	Total Points
♛ (England) Brendan Loughnane	2	0	0	1	0	0	9
♛ (United States) Chris Wade	2	0	0	0	1	0	8
♛ (United States) Bubba Jenkins	2	0	0	0	0	0	6
♛ (Russia) Movlid Khaybulaev	2	0	0	0	0	0	6
E (Brazil) Sheymon Moraes	1	0	1	0	1	0	5
E (United States) Tyler Diamond	1	0	1	0	0	0	3
E (United States) Lance Palmer	0	0	2	0	0	0	0
E (United States) Bobby Moffett	0	0	1	0	0	0	0
E (Russia) Arman Ospanov	0	0	1	0	0	0	0
E (United States) Jesse Stirn	0	0	1	0	0	0	-1

♛ = Clinched playoff spot

E = Eliminated

== See also ==
- List of PFL events
- List of current PFL fighters
