= Shane Burgos =

American mixed martial artist

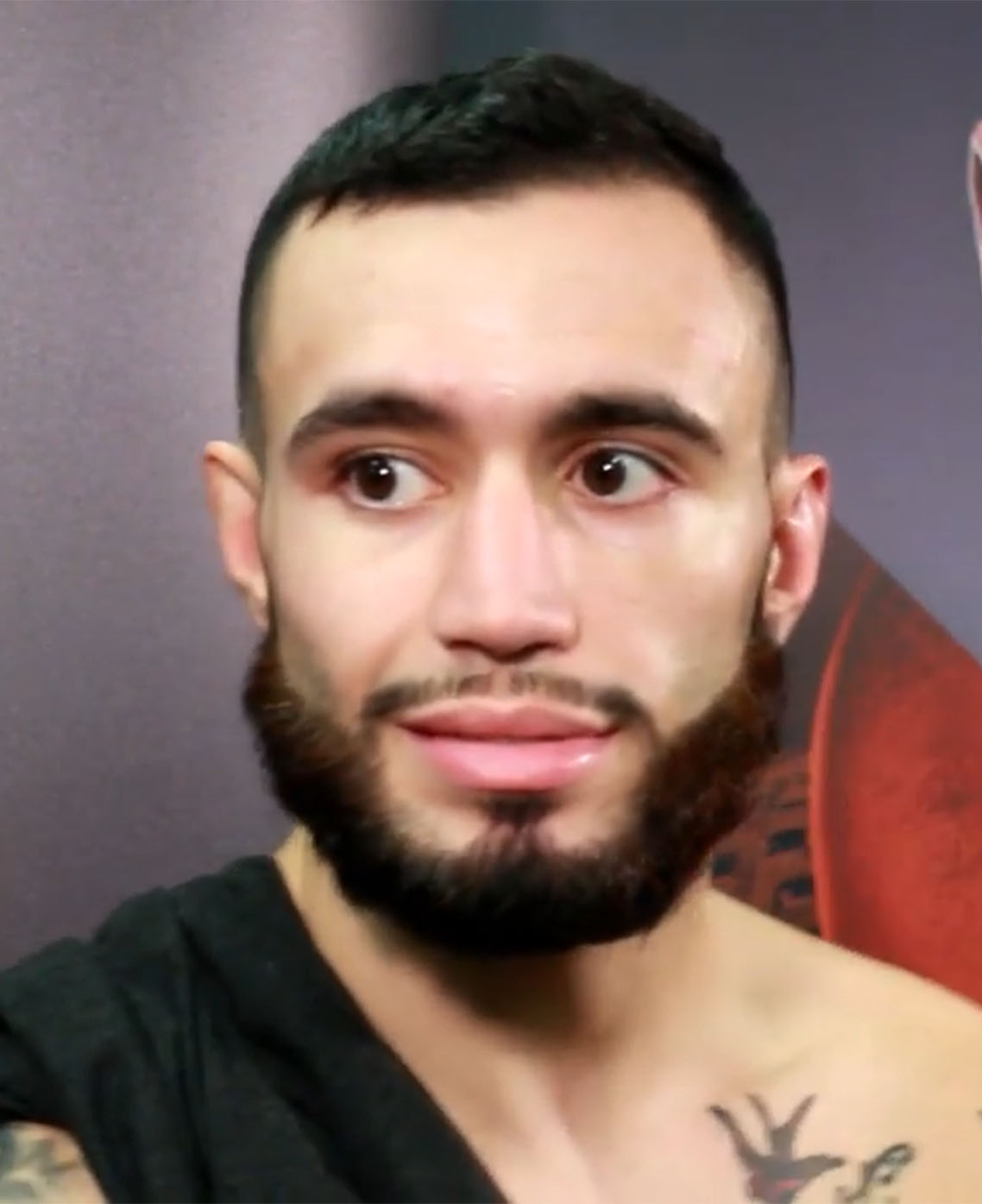
- Shane Burgos at UFC 230
- Born: March 19, 1991 (age 35) The Bronx, New York, U.S.
- Other names: Hurricane
- Height: 5 ft 11 in (1.80 m)
- Weight: 155 lb (70 kg; 11.1 st)
- Division: Lightweight; Featherweight
- Reach: 75 1/2 in (192 cm)
- Stance: Orthodox
- Fighting out of: Monroe, New York, United States
- Team: Tiger Schulmann
- Rank: Black belt in Tiger Schulmann's MMA
- Years active: 2013–present

Mixed martial arts record
- Total: 21
- Wins: 16
- By knockout: 5
- By submission: 5
- By decision: 6
- Losses: 5
- By knockout: 2
- By decision: 3

Other information
- Mixed martial arts record from Sherdog

Shane Burgos (born March 19, 1991) is an American professional mixed martial artist who currently competes in the Lightweight division. Burgos previously competed for Cage Fury Fighting Championships, Professional Fighters League (PFL), and the Ultimate Fighting Championship.

== Mixed martial arts career ==
=== Ultimate Fighting Championship ===
Burgos made his promotional debut on December 9, 2016 at UFC Fight Night 102 against Tiago Trator. He won the fight by unanimous decision.

Burgos's next fight came at UFC 210 against Charles Rosa. He won the fight via TKO in the third round. Both participants were awarded Fight of the Night for their performance.

He then faced Godofredo Pepey on July 22, 2017 at UFC on Fox 25. He won the fight by unanimous decision with scores of 30–26 (twice) and 29–28.

On January 20, 2018 at UFC 220, Burgos fought Calvin Kattar. He lost the fight via TKO in the third round. Subsequently, both participants were awarded the Fight of the Night bonus. This resulted in Burgos first loss.

Next, Burgos faced Kurt Holobaugh on November 3, 2018 at UFC 230. He won the fight via submission in round one.

Burgos next faced Cub Swanson on May 4, 2019 at UFC Fight Night 151. He won the fight via split decision.

Burgos's next and final fight of his prevailing contract was with Makwan Amirkhani on November 2, 2019 at UFC 244. He won the fight via TKO in the third round.

On March 29, 2020, news surfaced that after entertaining offers from various organizations, Burgos signed a new four-fight contract with the UFC.

Burgos faced Josh Emmett on June 20, 2020 at UFC on ESPN: Blaydes vs. Volkov. He lost the back-and-forth bout via unanimous decision. Subsequently, Burgos earned his third Fight of the Night bonus award.

Burgos was expected to face Hakeem Dawodu on January 24, 2021 at UFC 257. However, Dawodu was forced to withdraw from the bout, citing a shoulder injury. In turn, Burgos was removed from the card as well.

Burgos faced Edson Barboza on May 15, 2021 at UFC 262. Burgos lost the back-and-forth fight via knockout in the third round, experiencing a delayed reaction to being knocked out with a right cross. This fight earned Burgos the $75,000 Fight of the Night bonus award.

Burgos faced Billy Quarantillo on November 6, 2021 at UFC 268. Burgos won the fight via unanimous decision.

Burgos faced Charles Jourdain July 16, 2022, at UFC on ABC 3. He won the back-and-forth fight via majority decision.

=== Professional Fighters League ===
Following his fight with Jourdain, the last on his UFC contract, Burgos indicated he would test free agency. On August 15, 2022, Burgos announced he had signed with the Professional Fighters League (PFL).

Burgos was scheduled to face Marlon Moraes in his PFL debut on November 25, 2022 at PFL 10. However, Burgos withdrew from the bout due to an injury.

Moving up to Lightweight, Burgos started off the 2023 season against Olivier Aubin-Mercier on April 14, 2023 at PFL 3. He lost the bout via unanimous decision.

Burgos faced Yamato Nishikawa on June 23, 2023 at PFL 6. He won the fight by unanimous decision, but was eliminated from the PFL playoffs. However, after Natan Schulte and Raush Manfio were suspended for their bout, Burgos was allowed re-entry into the playoffs.

Burgos faced Clay Collard in the semi-finals of the lightweight tournament on August 23, 2023, at PFL 9. He lost the bout via unanimous decision thus marking the first time he was defeated in his home state.

On March 25, 2025, Burgos announced that he was a free agent.

== Championships and awards ==
- Ultimate Fighting Championship
  - Fight of the Night (Four times) vs. Charles Rosa, Calvin Kattar, Josh Emmett & Edson Barboza
  - UFC Honors Awards
    - 2020: President's Choice Fight of the Year Nominee vs. Josh Emmett
  - UFC.com Awards
    - 2018: Ranked #8 Fight of the Year vs. Calvin Kattar
    - 2020: Ranked #4 Fight of the Year vs. Josh Emmett
    - 2021: Ranked #6 Fight of the Year vs. Edson Barboza

== Mixed martial arts record ==
Professional record breakdown
21 matches	16 wins	5 losses
By knockout	5	2
By submission	5	0
By decision	6	3

Res.	Record	Opponent	Method	Event	Date	Round	Time	Location	Notes
Loss	16–5	Clay Collard	Decision (unanimous)	PFL 9 (2023)	August 23, 2023	3	5:00	New York City, New York, United States	2023 PFL Lightweight Tournament Semifinal.
Win	16–4	Yamato Nishikawa	Decision (unanimous)	PFL 6 (2023)	June 23, 2023	3	5:00	Atlanta, Georgia, United States	
Loss	15–4	Olivier Aubin-Mercier	Decision (unanimous)	PFL 3 (2023)	April 14, 2023	3	5:00	Las Vegas, Nevada, United States	Lightweight debut.
Win	15–3	Charles Jourdain	Decision (majority)	UFC on ABC: Ortega vs. Rodríguez	July 16, 2022	3	5:00	Elmont, New York, United States	
Win	14–3	Billy Quarantillo	Decision (unanimous)	UFC 268	November 6, 2021	3	5:00	New York City, New York, United States	
Loss	13–3	Edson Barboza	KO (punches)	UFC 262	May 15, 2021	3	1:16	Houston, Texas, United States	Fight of the Night.
Loss	13–2	Josh Emmett	Decision (unanimous)	UFC on ESPN: Blaydes vs. Volkov	June 20, 2020	3	5:00	Las Vegas, Nevada, United States	Fight of the Night.
Win	13–1	Makwan Amirkhani	TKO (punches)	UFC 244	November 2, 2019	3	4:32	New York City, New York, United States	
Win	12–1	Cub Swanson	Decision (split)	UFC Fight Night: Iaquinta vs. Cowboy	May 4, 2019	3	5:00	Ottawa, Ontario, Canada	
Win	11–1	Kurt Holobaugh	Submission (armbar)	UFC 230	November 3, 2018	1	2:11	New York City, New York, United States	
Loss	10–1	Calvin Kattar	TKO (punches)	UFC 220	January 20, 2018	3	0:32	Boston, Massachusetts, United States	Fight of the Night.
Win	10–0	Godofredo Pepey	Decision (unanimous)	UFC on Fox: Weidman vs. Gastelum	July 22, 2017	3	5:00	Uniondale, New York, United States	
Win	9–0	Charles Rosa	TKO (punches)	UFC 210	April 8, 2017	3	1:59	Buffalo, New York, United States	Fight of the Night.
Win	8–0	Tiago Trator	Decision (unanimous)	UFC Fight Night: Lewis vs. Abdurakhimov	December 9, 2016	3	5:00	Albany, New York, United States	
Win	7–0	Jacob Bohn	KO (punch)	CFFC 56	February 27, 2016	1	4:52	Philadelphia, Pennsylvania, United States	
Win	6–0	Terrell Hobbs	TKO (punches)	CFFC 45	February 7, 2015	1	4:03	Atlantic City, New Jersey, United States	
Win	5–0	Bill Algeo	Submission (rear-naked choke)	CFFC 42	October 25, 2014	2	2:35	Chester, Pennsylvania, United States	
Win	4–0	Donald Ooton	Submission (guillotine choke)	CFFC 35	April 26, 2014	1	3:10	Atlantic City, New Jersey, United States	
Win	3–0	Myron Baker	Submission (rear-naked choke)	CFFC 31	February 8, 2014	2	2:12	Atlantic City, New Jersey, United States	
Win	2–0	Ashure Elbanna	TKO (punches)	Ring of Combat 46	September 20, 2013	1	2:16	Atlantic City, New Jersey, United States	
Win	1–0	Ratioender Melo	Submission (rear-naked choke)	Xtreme Caged Combat: Vendetta	July 26, 2013	1	2:14	Philadelphia, Pennsylvania, United States	
