= PFL 5 =

PFL 5 may refer to the following events from the Professional Fighters League:

- PFL 5 (2018 season)
- PFL 5 (2019 season)
- PFL 5 (2021 season)
- PFL 5 (2022 season)
- PFL 5 (2023 season)
- PFL 5 (2024 season)

== See also ==
- PFL (disambiguation)
