= PFL 3 (2023) =

Professional Fighters League MMA event in 2023

- The poster for PFL 3
- Promotion: Professional Fighters League
- Date: April 14, 2023
- Venue: The Theater at Virgin Hotels
- City: Las Vegas, Nevada, United States

Event chronology
| PFL 2 | PFL 3 | PFL 4 |

The PFL 3 mixed martial arts event for the 2023 season of the Professional Fighters League was held on April 14, 2023, at The Theater at Virgin Hotels in Las Vegas, Nevada, United States. This marked the third regular-season event of the tournament and included fights in the Lightweight and Welterweight divisions.

== Background ==
The first round of the PFL regular season ended at this event, with Olivier Aubin-Mercier facing Shane Burgos, a free-agent acquisition in the lightweight division. In the welterweight division, Sadibou Sy met Jarrah Al-Silawi.

== Results ==
Main card (ESPN+)
| Weight class | | | | Method | Round | Time | Notes |
|---|---|---|---|---|---|---|---|
| Lightweight | Natan Schulte | def. | Stevie Ray | Decision (unanimous) (30–27, 30–27, 30–27) | 3 | 5:00 |
| Lightweight | Olivier Aubin-Mercier | def. | Shane Burgos | Decision (unanimous) (30–27, 30–27, 30–27) | 3 | 5:00 |
| Lightweight | Clay Collard | def. | Yamato Nishikawa | Decision (unanimous) (30–27, 30–27, 30–27) | 3 | 5:00 |
| Heavyweight | Denis Goltsov | def. | Cezar Ferreira | KO (punches) | 1 | 2:07 |
| Welterweight | Carlos Leal | def. | David Zawada | TKO (punches) | 1 | 2:25 |
| Welterweight | Magomed Umalatov | def. | Dilano Taylor | KO (punches) | 1 | 1:31 |
Postliminary card (ESPN2 / ESPN+)
| Welterweight | Sadibou Sy | def. | Jarrah Al-Silawi | TKO (knee to the body and punches) | 2 | 1:14 |
| Welterweight | Magomed Magomedkerimov | def. | Ben Egli | TKO (head kick) | 1 | 1:03 |
| Lightweight | Raush Manfio | def. | Alexander Martinez | Decision (unanimous) (29–28, 29–28, 30–27) | 3 | 5:00 |
| Welterweight | Nayib Lopez | def. | Shane Mitchell | Decision (unanimous) (29–27, 29–27, 29–27) | 3 | 5:00 | (Note: Lopez deducted one point for an illegal knee in round one.) |
| Lightweight | Bruno Miranda | def. | Ahmed Amir | Decision (unanimous) (30–27, 30–27, 30–27) | 3 | 5:00 |
| Welterweight | Zach Juusola | def. | Brandon Jenkins | Decision (unanimous) (29–28, 29–28, 29–27) | 3 | 5:00 |

== Standings after event ==
The PFL points system is based on results of the match. The winner of a fight receives 3 points. If the fight ends in a draw, both fighters will receive 1 point. The bonus for winning a fight in the first, second, or third round is 3 points, 2 points, and 1 point respectively. The bonus for winning in the third round requires a fight be stopped before 4:59 of the third round. No bonus point will be awarded if a fighter wins via decision. For example, if a fighter wins a fight in the first round, then the fighter will receive 6 total points. A decision win will result in three total points. If a fighter misses weight, the opponent (should they comply with weight limits) will receive 3 points due to a walkover victory, regardless of winning or losing the bout; if the non-offending fighter subsequently wins with a stoppage, all bonus points will be awarded.

=== Heavyweight ===
| Fighter | Wins | Draws | Losses | 1st | 2nd | 3rd | Total Points (Note: The four fighters with most points advance to the playoffs) |
|---|---|---|---|---|---|---|---|
| (Russia) Denis Goltsov | 1 | 0 | 0 | 1 | 0 | 0 | 6 |
| (Brazil) Bruno Cappelozza | 1 | 0 | 0 | 1 | 0 | 0 | 6 |
| (United States) Maurice Greene | 1 | 0 | 0 | 0 | 1 | 0 | 5 |
| (Brazil) Danilo Marques | 1 | 0 | 0 | 0 | 0 | 0 | 3 |
| (Russia) Rizvan Kuniev | 1 | 0 | 0 | 0 | 0 | 0 | 3 |
| (Brazil) Renan Ferreira | 0 | 0 | 1 | 0 | 0 | 0 | 0 |
| (Cape Verde) Yorgan De Castro | 0 | 0 | 1 | 0 | 0 | 0 | 0 |
| (Brazil) Marcelo Nunes | 0 | 0 | 1 | 0 | 0 | 0 | 0 |
| (Brazil) Matheus Scheffel | 0 | 0 | 1 | 0 | 0 | 0 | 0 |
| (Brazil) Cezar Ferreira | 0 | 0 | 1 | 0 | 0 | 0 | 0 |

=== Welterweight ===
| Fighter | Wins | Draws | Losses | 1st | 2nd | 3rd | Total Points (Note: The four fighters with most points advance to the playoffs) |
|---|---|---|---|---|---|---|---|
| (Russia) Magomed Umalatov | 1 | 0 | 0 | 1 | 0 | 0 | 6 |
| (Russia) Magomed Magomedkerimov | 1 | 0 | 0 | 1 | 0 | 0 | 6 |
| (Brazil) Carlos Leal | 1 | 0 | 0 | 1 | 0 | 0 | 6 |
| (Sweden) Sadibou Sy | 1 | 0 | 0 | 0 | 1 | 0 | 5 |
| (Mexico) Nayib López | 1 | 0 | 0 | 0 | 0 | 0 | 3 |
| (Australia) Shane Mitchell | 0 | 0 | 1 | 0 | 0 | 0 | 0 |
| (Jordan) Jarrah Al-Silawi | 0 | 0 | 1 | 0 | 0 | 0 | 0 |
| (Germany) David Zawada | 0 | 0 | 1 | 0 | 0 | 0 | 0 |
| (Jamaica) Dilano Taylor | 0 | 0 | 1 | 0 | 0 | 0 | 0 |
| (United States) Ben Egli | 0 | 0 | 1 | 0 | 0 | 0 | 0 |

=== Lightweight ===
| Fighter | Wins | Draws | Losses | 1st | 2nd | 3rd | Total Points (Note: The four fighters with most points advance to the playoffs) |
|---|---|---|---|---|---|---|---|
| (Canada) Olivier Aubin-Mercier | 1 | 0 | 0 | 0 | 0 | 0 | 3 |
| (United States) Clay Collard | 1 | 0 | 0 | 0 | 0 | 0 | 3 |
| (Brazil) Bruno Miranda | 1 | 0 | 0 | 0 | 0 | 0 | 3 |
| (Brazil) Natan Schulte | 1 | 0 | 0 | 0 | 0 | 0 | 3 |
| (Brazil) Raush Manfio | 1 | 0 | 0 | 0 | 0 | 0 | 3 |
| (Japan) Yamato Nishikawa | 0 | 0 | 1 | 0 | 0 | 0 | 0 |
| (Egypt) Ahmed Amir | 0 | 0 | 1 | 0 | 0 | 0 | 0 |
| (Paraguay) Alexander Martinez | 0 | 0 | 1 | 0 | 0 | 0 | 0 |
| (United States) Shane Burgos | 0 | 0 | 1 | 0 | 0 | 0 | 0 |
| (Scotland) Stevie Ray | 0 | 0 | 1 | 0 | 0 | 0 | 0 |

== See also ==
- List of PFL events
- List of current PFL fighters
