= Tiger Schulmann =

American martial artist and trainer

Daniel "Tiger" Schulmann
- Born: Daniel Schulmann; 1962 (age 63–64); New York City, United States
- Other names: Tiger
- Style: Kyokushin Karate & Mixed Martial Arts
- Team: Tiger Schulmann's Martial Arts

Daniel "Tiger" Schulmann (born July 2, 1962) is an American Kyokushin Karate and mixed martial arts trainer. Daniel Schulmann has trained many pro fighters including Jimmie Rivera, Lyman Good, Shane Burgos, Julio Arce, and Uriah Hall.

== Early life ==
Daniel Schulmann was born September 19, 1959 in New York City to a Jewish family. He began training in the martial arts in kyokushin karate at the age of six in New York City. He trained and competed throughout the United States, and internationally in Japan and Israel. As an adult, he has trained in grappling, boxing, kickboxing, and other martial arts disciplines.

== Professional career ==
Schulmann was the North American Mas Oyama Full-Contact Karate Champion for six consecutive years (1979–1984). In 1979, he was also the United States representative in the World Open Full-Contact Karate Championships in Tokyo. He was the youngest fighter, one of only eight fighters chosen nationwide. Schulmann was inducted into the North American Grappling Association Hall of Fame as a founding member in 2005 and the New Jersey Martial Arts Hall of Fame with the “Lifetime Achievement Award” in 2013.

== Tiger Schulmann's Martial Arts ==
Tiger Schulmann's Martial Arts (TSMA) has 55 schools in five states.

At TSMA, students are taught self-defense, including submission grappling (jiujitsu), and a hybrid style of kyokushin and kickboxing. Some TSMA students have competed in national MMA-style events such as in the UFC and for Bellator MMA.

In 2000, TSMA was fined $195,000 by the NY Attorney General for deceptive business practices.

The company is headquartered in Elmwood Park, New Jersey.
