= Movlid Khaybulaev =

Russian mixed martial artist

- Born: October 16, 1990 (age 36); Dagestan ASSR, Russian SFSR, Soviet Union
- Native name: Мовлид Хайбулаев
- Other names: Killer
- Nationality: Russian
- Height: 5 ft 6 in (1.68 m)
- Weight: 145 lb (66 kg; 10 st 5 lb)
- Division: Featherweight
- Reach: 70.0 in (178 cm)
- Fighting out of: Moscow, Russia
- Team: Fight Nights Team
- Years active: 2011–Present

Mixed martial arts record
- Total: 26
- Wins: 23
- By knockout: 6
- By submission: 3
- By decision: 14
- Losses: 0
- Draws: 1
- No contests: 2

Other information
- Mixed martial arts record from Sherdog

Movlid Khaybulaev (born October 16, 1990) is a Russian mixed martial artist who competes in the Featherweight division of the Professional Fighters League (PFL). He is a tournament champion in the promotion, winning the Featherweight Tournament in 2021. A professional competitor since 2011, he has competed also in Fight Nights Global, and ONE Championship.

== Personal life ==
Khaybulaev was born in the Republic of Dagestan, a republic of Russia situated in the North Caucasus region, along the Caspian Sea. Khaybulaev trains with former UFC Lightweight champion Khabib Nurmagomedov. Khaybulaev credits Nurmagomedov, as well as Nurmagomedov's father, Abdulmanap Nurmagomedov, who died due to COVID-19 complications in 2020, with inspiring him to compete in mixed martial arts.

Khaybulaev started with freestyle wrestling, but later the attention of the teenager switched to combat sambo. At the age of 16, Khaybulaev became the champion of the Southern Federal District in wrestling, and a year later, he secured the same result at the Russian Championship.

After, Khaybulaev entered the branch of the Law Academy under the Ministry of Justice of Russia, located in Makhachkala, in parallel with his studies. In 2009, again in the Southern Federal District, he took first place in the combat sambo championship, and after that he transitioned into mixed martial arts.

== Mixed martial arts career ==
=== Early career ===
In the same year, 2009, Khaybulaev took part in the Dagestan Mixed Fight Championship and, having won another big victory, met Abdulmanap Nurmagomedov. His first fight took place under the banners of ProFC, and in the fight, which took place in the format of 2 rounds of 5 minutes, the newcomer defeated Rustam Akhmarov.

In December of the same year, Khaybulaev participated in the MMA World Championship in Antalya, winning a gold medal at the event. After that, Khaybulaev got another victory among the pros and got the opportunity to fight in the Fight Nights league. The next three bouts took place there, with Khaybulaev picking up wins against Ruslan Yamanbaev, Alexander Panasyuk, and Vugar Bakhshiev.

By 2017, Khaybulaev had 11 victories in a row. After a quick finish in a fight with Paata Robakidze, his representatives came to the management of ONE Championship, and organized a fight for him in Malaysia against Herbert Burns at ONE: Throne of Tigers, Khaybulaev won the fight via unanimous decision.

Khaybulaev returned to Fight Nights, defeating Ilya Kurzanov in which he then signed a long-term contract with the PFL.

=== Professional Fighters League ===
==== 2019 season ====
During his May 2019 PFL debut at PFL 2 against Damon Jackson, Khaybulaev defeated Jackson via a flying knee in the first 10 seconds. He continued his streak of wins until his second fight with PFL at PFL 5, which ended in a majority draw against Andre Harrison.

During the 2019 Playoffs at PFL 8, Khaybulaev was knocked out by Daniel Pineda in 29 seconds of the first round. The result was later overturned to no contest after the Nevada State Athletic Commission suspended Pineda and fined him $12,500 after finding elevated testosterone levels from his bout with Khaybulaev on October 17, 2019.

After the 2020 PFL season was cancelled due to COVID, Khaybulaev competed at UAE Warriors 14 on November 27, 2020 against Zaka Fatullazade, submitting him in the first round with a rear-naked choke.

==== 2021 season ====
In 2021, Khaybulaev competed in his second PFL season. At PFL 1 (2021), he beat Lazar Stojadinovic to secure three points in the regular season. On June 25, 2021 at PFL 6, Khaybulaev beat 2019 featherweight champion Lance Palmer to secure three more points, bringing his season point total to six, thus securing him as the fourth seed in the featherweight bracket.

On August 13, 2021 Khaybulaev fought number one seed Brendan Loughnane in the 2021 PFL Playoffs at PFL 9 on August 27, 2021, edging out Loughnane with a split decision victory to clinch a spot in the 2021 PFL World Championships.

On October 27, 2021 at PFL 10, Khaybulaev faced off against Chris Wade for the 2021 PFL featherweight world title. Khaybulaev outperformed Wade for 5 rounds and won via unanimous decision to win the PFL Featherweight title and earned a $1 million collective prize.

In March 2022, PFL announced on Twitter that Khaybulaev was injured and would not be defending his crown in the 2022 season.

==== 2023 season ====
Khaybulaev started off the 2023 season against Ryoji Kudo on April 1, 2023 at PFL 1. He won the bout via unanimous decision.

Khaybulaev was scheduled to face Daniel Torres on June 8, 2023 at PFL 4. After Torres had failed a commission drug test and was pulled from the season, he was replaced by Tyler Diamond. Khaybulaev won the fight via an arm-triangle submission in the second round.

==== 2025 PFL Featherweight Tournament ====
After almost two-years hiatus, on February 12, 2025, the promotion officially revealed that Khaybulaev joined the 2025 PFL Featherweight Tournament. In the opening round, he faced Jeremy Kennedy.

In the quarterfinal, Khaybulaev faced Jeremy Kennedy on April 3, 2025, at PFL 1. He won the back-and-forth fight by split decision.

In the semifinal, Khaybulaev faced Kim Tae-kyun on June 12, 2025, at PFL 5. He won the fight via unanimous decision.

In the final, Khaybulaev faced Jesus Pinedo on August 1, 2025, at PFL 8. He won the bout via submission in the fifth round.

==== Doping ban and relinquishment of Featherweight Tournament Championship ====
On December 18, 2025, the United States Anti-Doping Agency (USADA) announced that Khaybulaev tested positive for recombinant human erythropoietin (rHuEPO, a synthetic form of EPO), and as a result was stripped by the PFL off his 2025 PFL Featherweight Tournament championship and the prize money associated with the win. Khaybulaev received a 12-month suspension from the USADA, retroactive to August 1, 2025, the date of his bout against Pinedo. Khaybulaev will be eligible to compete again on August 1, 2026.

Khaybulaev was scheduled to face Asaël Adjoudj on November 14, 2026, at PFL Returns to Dubai. However, the bout was removed from the event for unknown reasons.

== Championships and accomplishments ==
=== Mixed martial arts ===
- Professional Fighters League
  - 2021 PFL Featherweight Tournament Champion

== Mixed martial arts record ==
Professional record breakdown
26 matches	23 wins	0 losses
By knockout	6	0
By submission	3	0
By decision	14	0
Draws	1	
No contests	2	

Res.	Record	Opponent	Method	Event	Date	Round	Time	Location	Notes
NC	23–0–1 (2)	Jesus Pinedo	NC (overturned)	PFL 8 (2025)	August 1, 2025	5	1:17	Atlantic City, New Jersey, United States	Won the 2025 PFL Featherweight Tournament. Originally a submission (arm-triangle choke) win for Khaybulaev; overturned after he tested positive for a banned substance and stripped of the title on December 18, 2025.
Win	23–0–1 (1)	Kim Tae-kyun	Decision (unanimous)	PFL 5 (2025)	June 12, 2025	3	5:00	Nashville, Tennessee, United States	2025 PFL Featherweight Tournament Semifinal.
Win	22–0–1 (1)	Jeremy Kennedy	Decision (split)	PFL 1 (2025)	April 3, 2025	3	5:00	Orlando, Florida, United States	2025 PFL Featherweight Tournament Quarterfinal.
Win	21–0–1 (1)	Tyler Diamond	Submission (arm-triangle choke)	PFL 4 (2023)	June 8, 2023	2	4:23	Atlanta, Georgia, United States	
Win	20–0–1 (1)	Ryoji Kudo	Decision (unanimous)	PFL 1 (2023)	April 1, 2023	3	5:00	Las Vegas, Nevada, United States	
Win	19–0–1 (1)	Chris Wade	Decision (unanimous)	PFL 10 (2021)	October 27, 2021	5	5:00	Hollywood, Florida, United States	Won the 2021 PFL Featherweight Tournament.
Win	18–0–1 (1)	Brendan Loughnane	Decision (split)	PFL 9 (2021)	August 27, 2021	3	5:00	Hollywood, Florida, United States	2021 PFL Featherweight Tournament Semifinal.
Win	17–0–1 (1)	Lance Palmer	Decision (unanimous)	PFL 6 (2021)	June 25, 2021	3	5:00	Atlantic City, New Jersey, United States	
Win	16–0–1 (1)	Lazar Stojadinovic	Decision (unanimous)	PFL 1 (2021)	April 23, 2021	3	5:00	Atlantic City, New Jersey, United States	
Win	15–0–1 (1)	Zaka Fatullazade	Submission (rear-naked choke)	UAE Warriors 14	November 27, 2020	1	1:06	Abu Dhabi, United Arab Emirates	
NC	14–0–1 (1)	Daniel Pineda	NC (overturned by NSAC)	PFL 8 (2019)	October 17, 2019	1	0:29	Las Vegas, Nevada, United States	2019 PFL Featherweight Tournament Quarterfinal. Originally a TKO (punches) win for Pineda; overturned after he tested positive for a banned substance.
Draw	14–0–1	Andre Harrison	Draw (majority)	PFL 5 (2019)	July 25, 2019	3	5:00	Atlantic City, New Jersey, United States	
Win	14–0	Damon Jackson	KO (flying knee)	PFL 2 (2019)	May 23, 2019	1	0:10	Uniondale, New York, United States	
Win	13–0	Ilya Kurzanov	Decision (unanimous)	Fight Nights Global 77	October 17, 2017	3	5:00	Surgut, Russia	
Win	12–0	Herbert Burns	Decision (unanimous)	ONE: Throne of Tigers	February 10, 2017	3	5:00	Kuala Lumpur, Malaysia	
Win	11–0	Paata Robakidze	Submission (guillotine choke)	Fight Nights Global 53: Day 2	October 8, 2016	1	1:13	Moscow, Russia	
Win	10–0	Vugar Bakhshiev	TKO (elbows)	Fight Nights Global 48	May 26, 2016	3	3:47	Moscow, Russia	
Win	9–0	Alexander Panasyuk	TKO (punches)	Formula Fight 5	April 22, 2016	1	2:12	Moscow, Russia	Catchweight (150 lb) bout.
Win	8–0	Ruslan Yamanbaev	Decision (unanimous)	Fight Nights Global 44	February 26, 2016	3	5:00	Moscow, Russia	
Win	7–0	Vladimir Egoyan	TKO (flying knee)	Fight Nights Global 41	September 25, 2015	1	2:04	Makhachkala, Russia	
Win	6–0	Alexander Panasyuk	KO (punches)	Astrakhan MMA Federation: Battle on the Volga	May 8, 2015	1	1:36	Astrakhan, Russia	Lightweight bout.
Win	5–0	Dmitriy Korobeynikov	TKO (punches)	Fight Nights Global 33	September 25, 2015	2	4:13	Moscow, Russia	Catchweight (150 lb) bout.
Win	4–0	Ilya Kurzanov	Decision (split)	Fight Nights: Battle of Moscow 17	September 25, 2014	2	5:00	Moscow, Russia	Featherweight debut.
Win	3–0	Abdul-Rakhman Dudaev	Decision (unanimous)	Fight Nights: Battle of Moscow 16	July 11, 2014	2	5:00	Moscow, Russia	
Win	2–0	Akhal Aliev	Decision (unanimous)	Dictator FC 1	June 28, 2012	2	5:00	Moscow, Russia	
Win	1–0	Rustam Akhmarov	Decision (unanimous)	ProFC 36	October 11, 2011	2	5:00	Khasavyurt, Russia	Lightweight debut.

== See also ==
- List of male mixed martial artists
- List of undefeated mixed martial artists
