= PFL 9 (2021) =

Professional Fighters League mixed martial arts event in 2021

- The poster for PFL 9
- Promotion: Professional Fighters League
- Date: August 27, 2021
- Venue: Seminole Hard Rock Hotel & Casino Hollywood
- City: Hollywood, Florida, United States

Event chronology
PFL 8	PFL 9	PFL 10

The PFL 9 mixed martial arts event for the 2021 season of the Professional Fighters League was held on August 27, 2021. This was the third event of the playoffs with the Featherweight and Light Heavyweight divisions competing. This event aired on ESPN2, with the prelims airing on ESPN+.

== Background ==
The fight card marked the final playoff event with featherweights and light heavyweights competing in the playoff semifinals.

Headliners Brendan Loughnane and Movlid Khaybulaev met in a featherweight contest, each fighter looking for their first PFL Championship berth. Loughnane debuted in Season 2 with a pair of wins in one-off fights, while Khaybulaev fell short in the Season 2 quarterfinals after suffering a knockout loss against Daniel Pineda, who was later suspended for an anti-doping violation.

The other featherweight bracket saw the wrestling standout Bubba Jenkins, in his first PFL season, take on three-time PFL Playoff competitor Chris Wade and light heavyweights Cezar Ferreira and Marthin Hamlet met for a shot at fighting in the PFL Championship. The other light heavyweight bout saw Season 2 light heavyweight champ and No. 4 seed Emiliano Sordi take on UFC veteran Antônio Carlos Júnior.

At weigh-ins, Bobby Moffett weighed in at 148.2 pounds, missing weight by 2.2 pounds. The bout proceeded at catchweight and Moffett was fined a percentage of his purse, which went to Jason Knight.

== Results ==
Main Card (ESPN2)
Weight class				Method	Round	Time	Notes
Featherweight	Movlid Khaybulaev	def.	Brendan Loughnane	Decision (split) (30-27, 28-29, 29-28)	3	5:00
Featherweight	Chris Wade	def.	Bubba Jenkins	Decision (unanimous) (30-27, 30-27, 29-28)	3	5:00
Light Heavyweight	Antônio Carlos Júnior	def.	Emiliano Sordi	Decision (unanimous) (30-27, 29-28, 29-28)	3	5:00
Light Heavyweight	Marthin Hamlet	def.	Cezar Ferreira	TKO (leg injury)	1	0:13
Preliminary card (ESPN+)
Featherweight	Sheymon Moraes	def.	Lazar Stojadinovic	TKO (punches)	2	4:45
Light Heavyweight	Chris Camozzi	def.	Cory Hendricks	Decision (unanimous) (30-27, 30-27, 29-28)	3	5:00
Featherweight	Anthony Dizy	def.	Jesse Stirn	Decision (unanimous) (29-28, 29-28, 29-28)	3	5:00
Featherweight	Bobby Moffett	def.	Jason Knight	Decision (unanimous) (29-28, 29-28, 29-28)	3	5:00
Featherweight	Alejandro Flores	def.	Carl Deaton III	Decision (split) (29-28, 28-29, 29-28)	3	5:00
Lightweight	Brandon Jenkins	def.	Jacob Kilburn	KO (flying knee)	1	2:56

== 2021 PFL Light Heavyweight playoffs ==
Semifinals
1	(Brazil) Antônio Carlos Júnior	UD
4	(Argentina) Emiliano Sordi	3
2	(Brazil) Cezar Ferreira	1
3	(Norway) Marthin Hamlet	TKO

Finals
1	(Brazil) Antônio Carlos Júnior	SUB
3	(Norway) Marthin Hamlet	1

Legend
(SD)	(Split Decision)
(UD)	(Unanimous Decision)
(MD)	(Majority Decision)
SUB	Submission
(T)KO	(Technical) Knock Out
L	Loss

== 2021 PFL Featherweight playoffs ==
Semifinals
1	(England) Brendan Loughnane	3
4	(Russia) Movlid Khaybulaev	SD
2	(United States) Chris Wade	UD
3	(United States) Bubba Jenkins	3

Finals
4	(Russia) Movlid Khaybulaev	UD
2	(United States) Chris Wade	5

Legend
(SD)	(Split Decision)
(UD)	(Unanimous Decision)
(MD)	(Majority Decision)
SUB	Submission
(T)KO	(Technical) Knock Out
L	Loss

== See also ==
- List of PFL events
- List of current PFL fighters
