= Viktor Pešta =

Czech mixed martial arts fighter

- Born: 15 July 1990 (age 36); Příbram, Czechoslovakia (now Czech Republic)
- Other names: Takedown Machine; Poor Honza (Czech: Chudý Honza)
- Nationality: Czech
- Height: 6 ft 3 in (191 cm)
- Weight: 205 lb (93 kg; 14 st 9 lb)
- Division: Heavyweight (2010–2019, 2023-); Light Heavyweight (2020–2022)
- Reach: 77.0 in (196 cm)
- Stance: Orthodox
- Fighting out of: Prague, Czech Republic
- Team: Kill Cliff FC; Penta Gym Prague
- Years active: 2010–present

Mixed martial arts record
- Total: 28
- Wins: 19
- By knockout: 8
- By submission: 7
- By decision: 4
- Losses: 9
- By knockout: 6
- By submission: 1
- By decision: 2

Other information
- Website: http://www.viktorpesta.com
- Mixed martial arts record from Sherdog

Viktor Pešta (Czech pronunciation: [ˈvɪktor ˈpɛʃta]; born 15 July 1990) is a Czech mixed martial artist who competes in the Heavyweight division of Konfrontacja Sztuk Walki (KSW). He is currently ranked #6 in the KSW Heavyweight rankings.

Pešta was a Gladiator Championship Fighting Heavyweight Champion, WASO World Heavyweight Champion, Oktagon MMA Light heavyweight Champion and he competed in the Heavyweight division of the Ultimate Fighting Championship. He became historically the second UFC fighter from the Czech Republic, after Karlos Vemola.

== Mixed martial arts career ==
=== Early career ===
In 2006, Pešta started training Traditional Musado under the leadership of Vít Skalník. Traditional Musado is the civilian version of Musado, the close quarters combat system used by the Military of the Czech Republic. In 2008, he started training MMA under the leadership of Jiří Vesecký in the gym in Příbram, Bohemia.

Pešta moved to Prague to study at university and to pursue MMA career. In Prague, he began training in Penta Gym. He began amateur fighting at age of 18 and made his professional MMA debut in 2010.

His last fight in GCF was with longtime GCF Heavyweight Champion Lukáš Ťupa for the GFC Heavyweight Championship on 7 December 2013 at GCF 26: Fight Night. Pešta won in the first round by his signature move, strikes from the (side) mounted crucifix position and he became the new GCF Heavyweight Champion and #1 in Czech heavyweight rankings.

=== Ultimate Fighting Championship ===
Pešta became internationally well known for his website, letmebeyoursparringpartner.com. In February 2014, Pešta was offered a contract with the UFC.

Pešta made his debut against face fellow newcomer Ruslan Magomedov on 31 May 2014 at UFC Fight Night 41. He lost the fight via unanimous decision.

For his second fight with the promotion, Pešta faced touted newcomer Konstantin Erokhin on 24 January 2015 at UFC on Fox 14. Pešta won the fight by unanimous decision.

Pešta faced Derrick Lewis on 3 October 2015 at UFC 192. He lost the fight via TKO in the third round.

Pešta faced Marcin Tybura on 6 August 2016 at UFC Fight Night 92. He lost the fight via head kick KO in the second round.

Pešta was expected to face Damian Grabowski on 15 January 2017 at UFC Fight Night 103. However, Grabowski pulled out of the fight in late December for undisclosed reasons and was replaced by Alexey Oleynik. He lost the fight via submission in the first round.

In May 2017, Pešta was released from the company.

=== Fight Nights Global ===
He signed a contract with Fight Nights Global in the second part of year 2017 after one match at home organization XFN.

=== OKTAGON MMA ===
In 2019, Pešta signed with OKTAGON MMA and made his promotional debut against Mike Kyle at OKTAGON 13 on 27 July 2019. He won the fight via first-round submission.

He then challenged Michal Martínek for the OKTAGON MMA Heavyweight Championship at OKTAGON 15 on 9 November 2019. He lost the fight in the first round due to an injury.

==== Move down to Light Heavyweight ====
Pešta was expected to face Csaba Hocz at OKTAGON 16 on 26 September 2020. However, Pešta tested positive for COVID-19 and was replaced by Alexander Poppeck.

Pešta faced Ildemar Alcântara at OKTAGON 20 on 30 December 2020. He won the bout via TKO in the first round.

Pešta faced Riccardo Nosiglia at OKTAGON 24 on 29 May 2021. He won the bout via TKO after ground and pounding Nosiglia.

Pešta faced Stephan Puetz for the OKTAGON MMA Light Heavyweight Championship at OKTAGON 28 on 25 September 2021. He won the bout via doctor stoppage after the doctor ended the bout after the third round due to a nose injury.

=== Professional Fighters League ===
Pešta faced Omari Akhmedov on 23 April 2022 at PFL 1. He lost the bout after getting knocked out in first round.

Pešta faced Rob Wilkinson on 17 June 2022 at PFL 4. He lost the bout via TKO stoppage in the first round.

=== Konfrontacja Sztuk Walki ===
On 9 January 2023, it was announced that Pešta signed with KSW, with him making his debut at KSW 86: Wikłacz vs. Przybysz 4 on 16 September 2023 against Filip Stawowy, in a bout that saw him submit his opponent in the first round via rear-naked choke.

Pešta faced Szymon Bajor on 16 December 2023 at KSW 89: Bartosiński vs. Parnasse, losing the bout via split decision.

== Personal life ==
Pešta's signature move, the (side) mounted crucifix position, was nicknamed/called "Bába pod kořenem (English: The crone under the root)" by his fans, after the famous Czech TV Nova's report about an elderly woman who gets stuck for 11 hours under the root of a tree overnight, 50 meters away from her rented hut in the forest and her friends.

Poor Honza, Pešta's Czech nickname, is a Czech fairy tale hero, similar to the English Jack, the German Hans (or Hänsel) or the Russian Ivan.

== Championships and accomplishments ==
- OKTAGON MMA
  - 2021 OKTAGON MMA Light Heavyweight Champion
- World Association of Sporting Organizations
  - 2019 WASO World Heavyweight Champion
- Gladiator Championship Fighting
  - 2013 GCF Heavyweight Champion

== Mixed martial arts record ==
Professional record breakdown
| 28 matches | 19 wins | 9 losses |
| By knockout | 8 | 6 |
| By submission | 7 | 1 |
| By decision | 4 | 2 |

| Res. | Record | Opponent | Method | Event | Date | Round | Time | Location | Notes |
|---|---|---|---|---|---|---|---|---|---|
| Loss | 19–9 | Szymon Bajor | Decision (split) | KSW 89 | 16 December 2023 | 3 | 5:00 | Gliwice, Poland | |
| Win | 19–8 | Filip Stawowy | Submission (rear-naked choke) | KSW 86 | 16 September 2023 | 1 | 2:12 | Wrocław, Poland | Return to Heavyweight. Submission of the Night. |
| Loss | 18–8 | Rob Wilkinson | TKO (punches) | PFL 4 (2022) | 17 June 2022 | 1 | 3:03 | Atlanta, Georgia, United States | |
| Loss | 18–7 | Omari Akhmedov | KO (punches) | PFL 1 (2022) | 20 April 2022 | 1 | 1:25 | Arlington, Texas, United States | |
| Win | 18–6 | Stephan Püetz | TKO (doctor stoppage) | Oktagon 28 | 25 September 2021 | 3 | 5:00 | Prague, Czech Republic | Won the inaugural Oktagon Light Heavyweight Championship. |
| Win | 17–6 | Riccardo Nosiglia | TKO (punches) | Oktagon 24 | 29 May 2021 | 2 | 0:50 | Brno, Czech Republic | |
| Win | 16–6 | Ildemar Alcântara | TKO (punches) | Oktagon 20 | 30 December 2020 | 1 | 4:06 | Brno, Czech Republic | Light Heavyweight debut. |
| Loss | 15–6 | Michal Martínek | TKO (injury broken jaw) | Oktagon 15 | 9 November 2019 | 1 | 2:49 | Prague, Czech Republic | For the Oktagon Heavyweight Championship. |
| Win | 15–5 | Mike Kyle | Submission (rear-naked choke) | Oktagon 13 | 27 July 2019 | 1 | 1:59 | Prague, Czech Republic | Catchweight (212 lbs) bout. |
| Win | 14–5 | Ivan Vitasović | Submission (rear-naked choke) | Night of Warriors 15 | 6 April 2019 | 3 | 3:16 | Liberec, Czech Republic | Won the NOW Heavyweight Championship. |
| Loss | 13–5 | Alexander Emelianenko | TKO (punches) | RCC 3 | 9 July 2018 | 2 | 3:52 | Yekaterinburg, Russia | |
| Win | 13–4 | Alexander Gladkov | Decision (unanimous) | Fight Nights Global 84 | 2 March 2018 | 3 | 5:00 | Bratislava, Slovakia | |
| Win | 12–4 | Alexei Kudin | Submission (rear-naked choke) | Fight Nights Global 79 | 19 November 2017 | 1 | 4:52 | Penza, Russia | |
| Win | 11–4 | Michał Kita | TKO (punches) | X Fight Nights 3 | 25 June 2017 | 2 | 4:39 | Prague, Czech Republic | |
| Loss | 10–4 | Aleksei Oleinik | Submission (Ezekiel choke) | UFC Fight Night: Rodríguez vs. Penn | 15 January 2017 | 1 | 2:57 | Phoenix, Arizona, United States | |
| Loss | 10–3 | Marcin Tybura | KO (head kick) | UFC Fight Night: Rodríguez vs. Caceres | 6 August 2016 | 2 | 0:53 | Salt Lake City, Utah, United States | |
| Loss | 10–2 | Derrick Lewis | TKO (punches) | UFC 192 | 3 October 2015 | 3 | 1:15 | Houston, Texas, United States | |
| Win | 10–1 | Konstantin Erokhin | Decision (unanimous) | UFC on Fox: Gustafsson vs. Johnson | 24 January 2015 | 3 | 5:00 | Stockholm, Sweden | |
| Loss | 9–1 | Ruslan Magomedov | Decision (unanimous) | UFC Fight Night: Muñoz vs. Mousasi | 31 May 2014 | 3 | 5:00 | Berlin, Germany | |
| Win | 9–0 | Lukáš Ťupa | TKO (elbows) | Gladiator CF 26 | 7 December 2013 | 1 | 2:18 | Prague, Czech Republic | Won the GCF Heavyweight Championship. |
| Win | 8–0 | Yosef Ali Mohammad | Decision (result overturned by SMMAF) | Heroes Fighting 1 | 23 March 2013 | 3 | 5:00 | Halmstad, Sweden | Originally a split decision win for Mohammad; overturned later by SMMAF. |
| Win | 7–0 | Saša Lazić | TKO (punches) | Heroes Gate 9 | 28 December 2012 | 1 | 1:53 | Prague, Czech Republic | |
| Win | 6–0 | Christian Colombo | Submission (rear-naked choke) | European MMA 1: Casino Fight Night 2 | 15 September 2012 | 2 | 1:07 | Copenhagen, Denmark | |
| Win | 5–0 | Zoran Krpan | TKO (elbows) | Gladiator CF 12 | 11 May 2012 | 1 | 2:16 | Brno, Czech Republic | |
| Win | 4–0 | Lukáš Olejník | Submission (rear-naked choke) | Gladiator CF 8 | 10 February 2012 | 1 | 1:01 | Příbram, Czech Republic | |
| Win | 3–0 | Alexander Uhlíř | TKO (punches) | Noc Valecniku: Warrior Night 3 | 15 December 2011 | 1 | 3:59 | Kladno, Czech Republic | |
| Win | 2–0 | Štefan Krajčí | Decision (unanimous) | Gladiator CF 2 | 20 February 2011 | 3 | 5:00 | Mladá Boleslav, Czech Republic | |
| Win | 1–0 | Vít Mrákota | Submission (armbar) | Gladiator CF 1 | 5 December 2010 | 1 | 1:49 | Prague, Czech Republic | Heavyweight debut. |

=== Amateur record ===
| Res. | Record | Opponent | Method | Event | Date | Round | Time | Location | Notes |
|---|---|---|---|---|---|---|---|---|---|
| Loss | 1-1 | Josef Říha | Decision | Twins Cup - Czech National Championship in Thaiboxing and MMA | 23 May 2010 | 2 | 5:00 | Prague, Czech Republic | +96 kg weight class; |
| Win | 1-0 | Petr Horňák | Submission (guillotine choke) | Twins Cup - Czech National Championship in Thaiboxing and MMA | 28 March 2010 | 2 | N/A | Prague, Czech Republic | +96 kg weight class; |

== See also ==
- List of current KSW fighters
- List of male mixed martial artists
