= PFL 1 (2021) =

Professional Fighters League mixed martial arts event in 2021

- The poster for PFL 1
- Promotion: Professional Fighters League
- Date: April 23, 2021
- Venue: Ocean Casino Resort
- City: Atlantic City, New Jersey, United States
- Estimated viewers: 156,000

Event chronology
PFL 10	PFL 1	PFL 2

The PFL 1 mixed martial arts event for the 2021 season of the Professional Fighters League was held on April 23, 2021. This was the first regular season event of the tournament and included fights in the Featherweight and Lightweight divisions.

== Background ==
The event was headlined by a lightweight clash between the former UFC and WEC Lightweight champion Anthony Pettis and the UFC veteran Clay Collard. In the co-main event, the two-time PFL Lightweight tournament winner Natan Schulte faced the former Bellator Lightweight title challenger Marcin Held.

The remaining two fights of the main card were held in the featherweight division: former two-time PFL Featherweight champion Lance Palmer faced the 2011 NCAA Division I champion Bubba Jenkins and Movlid Khaybulaev was to face Jason Soares. However, Soares was removed from the PFL season and his fight against Movlid Khaibulaev after failing medicals. He was replaced by Lazar Stojadinovic.

A lightweight bout between Joilton Lutterbach and Olivier Aubin-Mercier was planned for this event, however Olivier pulled out due to injury and was replaced by Former Titan FC lightweight champion Raush Manfio. Olivier is expected to return in June.

Johnny Case was expected to face Loik Radzhabov at this event. However, due to an arrest, Case had to pull out and was replaced by Alexander Martinez.

At weigh-ins, Mikhail Odintsov weighed in at 156.4 pounds, missing weight by .4 pounds. He was fined 20 percent of his purse, ineligible to win playoff points, given a walkover loss, and was penalized one point in the standings. Akhmet Aliev received a walkover win regardless of bout outcome but is eligible to gain stoppage points.

== Results ==
Main Card (ESPN 2)
Weight class				Method	Round	Time	Notes
Lightweight	Clay Collard	def.	Anthony Pettis	Decision (unanimous) (29-27, 29-27, 29-28)	3	5:00
Lightweight	Marcin Held	def.	Natan Schulte	Decision (unanimous) (29-28, 29-28, 29-28)	3	5:00
Featherweight	Movlid Khaybulaev	def.	Lazar Stojadinovic	Decision (unanimous) (30-27, 30-27, 30-27)	3	5:00
Featherweight	Bubba Jenkins	def.	Lance Palmer	Decision (unanimous) (30-27, 30-27, 30-27)	3	5:00
Preliminary card (ESPN+)
Featherweight	Brendan Loughnane	def.	Sheymon Moraes	KO (punches)	1	2:55
Lightweight	Raush Manfio	def.	Joilton Lutterbach	Decision (split) (28-29, 29-28, 29-28)	3	5:00
Lightweight	Akhmet Aliev	def.	Mikhail Odintsov	Decision (unanimous) (29-28, 29-28, 29-28)	3	5:00
Featherweight	Chris Wade	def.	Anthony Dizy	Decision (unanimous) (29-28, 29-28, 29-28)	3	5:00
Featherweight	Tyler Diamond	def.	Sung Bin Jo	Decision (unanimous) (30-27, 30-27, 30-27)	3	5:00
Lightweight	Alexander Martinez	def.	Loik Radzhabov	Decision (split) (29-28, 28-29, 30-27)	3	5:00

== Standings After Event ==
The PFL points system is based on results of the match. The winner of a fight receives 3 points. If the fight ends in a draw, both fighters will receive 1 point. The bonus for winning a fight in the first, second, or third round is 3 points, 2 points, and 1 point respectively. The bonus for winning in the third round requires a fight be stopped before 4:59 of the third round. No bonus point will be awarded if a fighter wins via decision. For example, if a fighter wins a fight in the first round, then the fighter will receive 6 total points. A decision win will result in three total points. If a fighter misses weight, the opponent (should they comply with weight limits) will receive 3 points due to a walkover victory, regardless of winning or losing the bout, with the fighter who missed weight being deducted 1 standings point; if the non-offending fighter subsequently wins with a stoppage, all bonus points will be awarded. A fighter who was unable to compete for any reason, will receive a 1-point penalty (-1 point in the standings). The fighters who made weight will not receive a walkover, but will earn points and contracted purse amounts based on their performance in the altered matchup.

=== Lightweight ===
Fighter	Wins	Draws	Losses	1st	2nd	3rd	Total Points (Note: The four fighters with most points advance to the playoffs)
Akhmet Aliev	1	0	0	0	0	0	3
Clay Collard	1	0	0	0	0	0	3
Marcin Held	1	0	0	0	0	0	3
Raush Manfio	1	0	0	0	0	0	3
Alexander Martinez	1	0	0	0	0	0	3
Joilton Lutterbach	0	0	1	0	0	0	0
Anthony Pettis	0	0	1	0	0	0	0
Loik Radzhabov	0	0	1	0	0	0	0
Natan Schulte	0	0	1	0	0	0	0
Mikhail Odintsov	0	0	1	0	0	0	-1

=== Featherweight ===
Fighter	Wins	Draws	Losses	1st	2nd	3rd	Total Points (Note: The four fighters with most points advance to the playoffs)
Brendan Loughnane	1	0	0	1	0	0	6
Tyler Diamond	1	0	0	0	0	0	3
Bubba Jenkins	1	0	0	0	0	0	3
Movlid Khaybulaev	1	0	0	0	0	0	3
Chris Wade	1	0	0	0	0	0	3
Sung Bin Jo	0	0	1	0	0	0	0
Anthony Dizy	0	0	1	0	0	0	0
Sheymon Moraes	0	0	1	0	0	0	0
Lance Palmer	0	0	1	0	0	0	0
Lazar Stojadinovic	0	0	1	0	0	0	0

== See also ==
- List of PFL events
- List of current PFL fighters
