= Raush Manfio =

Brazilian mixed martial arts fighter

- Born: Raush Manfio Lourenco; November 3, 1991 (age 34); Porto Alegre, Brazil
- Other names: Cavalo de Guerra
- Height: 172 cm (5 ft 8 in)
- Weight: 70 kg (154 lb; 11 st 0 lb)
- Division: Lightweight; Featherweight
- Reach: 185 cm (73 in)
- Fighting out of: Porto Alegre, Rio Grande do Sul, Brazil
- Team: American Top Team; Team Nogueira
- Years active: 2011–present

Mixed martial arts record
- Total: 26
- Wins: 17
- By knockout: 8
- By decision: 9
- Losses: 9
- By knockout: 3
- By submission: 1
- By decision: 5

Other information
- Mixed martial arts record from Sherdog

Raush Manfio Lourenço (born November 3, 1991) is a Brazilian professional mixed martial artist who competes in the lightweight division. A professional since 2011, Manfio is most notable for winning the 2021 Professional Fighters League Lightweight tournament. Fight Matrix had him ranked a top 10 lightweight in the world in May 2022.

== Personal life ==
Manfio was born in Porto Alegre, Rio Grande do Sul, Brazil on November 3, 1991. Raush, a professional MMA fighter since 2011, initially lived a carefree lifestyle as a "playboy" in Brazil. After a setback in the TUF Brasil qualifiers, he sought improvement, joining American Top Team in Florida. Struggling with finances and unable to bring his wife initially, the church community stepped in to help, allowing her to join him. Despite early success in Titan FC, visa issues and financial struggles followed. Raush took odd jobs, learning construction skills, and faced setbacks, including a title loss. Frustratingly, he went without fights for three years, facing financial difficulties with a growing family. Despite contemplating a career change, Raush's wife, Michele, urged him to persist. The COVID-19 pandemic worsened their situation in 2020. Considering a shift away from fighting, Raush gave himself an ultimatum, planning to quit with his manager's encouragement. However, his manager insisted on one more month, supporting him financially and expressing belief in his potential championship. He was eventually signed as a late replacement for the PFL season.

Manfio is best friends with two-time PFL Lightweight champion Natan Schulte. Schulte is the godfather of Manfio’s daughter.

== Mixed martial arts career ==
Manfio began competing in professional MMA in 2011 in his native Brazil, with a win against Demetro Borges in Brazil's Valiant FC 8 promotion.

=== The Ultimate Fighter ===
In March 2015, it was announced that Manfio was one of the fighters selected to be on the UFC reality show The Ultimate Fighter: Brazil 4. Manfio was eliminated by eventual lightweight season winner Glaico França.

After losing on the Ultimate Fighter, He found his way to American Top Team with the support of MMA veteran Carlos Barreto, and it was during this time that he received a glimmer of hope from a friend's promise of sponsorship. It seemed like a lifeline to continue his journey in the U.S.

However, the promise of sponsorship turned out to be a mirage. With no money and no options, Manfio made a bold choice to leave the U.S. behind. But fate had other plans. As he lived in one of the apartments provided by ATT and befriended Adriano Moraes, a ONE Championship fighter, an unexpected opportunity presented itself. Moraes needed a cornerman for his fight in Myanmar, and Manfio stepped up.

That experience reignited Manfio's passion for fighting, and it was through Moraes' manager, Alex Davis, that he received an offer that changed his trajectory. A fight at Titan FC was on the table, and Manfio seized it.

He debuted in the United States at Titan FC in 2016. From November 2017 to June 2018, he held the role of Titan FC lightweight champion, after defeating Chazz Walton via knockout in the first round. He lost the title to Sidney Outlaw at Titan FC 50. However, a disappointing loss and inadequate compensation for his efforts forced him to take a job in construction to fund his work visa. Before signing with PFL, Manfio hadn't fought in three years and was working teaching MMA and as a janitor.

=== Professional Fighters League ===
==== 2021 Season ====
Manfio made his PFL debut as a short notice replacement for Olivier Aubin-Mercier against Joilton Lutterbach on April 23, 2021 at PFL 1. He won the bout via split decision.

After being initially booked as a short notice replacement for Mikhail Odintsov against his teammate Natan Schulte at PFL 4 on June 10, 2021, Manfio was later rebooked against Anthony Pettis at PFL 6 on June 25, 2021 after Pettis pulled out of his previous bout due to illness. Manfio won the close bout via split decision.

In the semi-finals of the Lightweight tournament, Manfio faced Clay Collard on August 13, 2021 at PFL 7. Manfio won the bout via unanimous decision.

Manfio faced Loik Radzhabov in the Finals of the Lightweight tournament on 27 October 2021 at PFL 10. He won the bout via unanimous decision, winning the 2021 PFL Lightweight Tournament and $1 million dollar prize.

In February 2021, YouTuber Jake Paul hired Manfio to spar with him in preparation for Paul's fight against former Bellator and ONE Welterweight Champion Ben Askren. As of 2022, Manfio trains at American Top Team in Coconut Creek, Florida.

==== 2022 Season ====
Manfio faced Don Madge on April 23, 2022 at PFL 1. In a comeback fashion, Manfio won the bout after dropping Madge in the third round and finishing with ground and pound.

Manfio faced Olivier Aubin-Mercier on June 17, 2022 at PFL 4. He lost the bout via unanimous decision.

==== 2023 Season ====
Manfio started off the 2023 season against Alex Martinez on April 14, 2023, at PFL 3. He won the bout via unanimous decision.

Manfio faced Natan Schulte on June 23, 2023 at PFL 6. Manfio lost via a unanimous decision in a fight that saw both men, who openly state to be best friends, refuse to engage. Following the fight, PFL suspended both fighters, saying in a statement that "All fighters in their PFL Fight Agreements agree to use their best efforts ... skills and abilities as a professional athlete to compete ... and defeat any opponent. It was very clear that Natan and Raush did not meet that contractual standard in yesterday’s bout."

On October 6, 2023, Manfio announced on his social media that he was no longer with PFL.

== Championships and accomplishments ==
=== Mixed martial arts ===
- Professional Fighters League
  - 2021 PFL Lightweight Championship
- Titan FC
  - Titan FC Lightweight Championship (One time)
    - One successful title defence
- MMA Junkie
  - 2021 Newcomer of the Year

== Mixed martial arts record ==
Professional record breakdown
26 matches	17 wins	9 losses
By knockout	8	3
By submission	0	1
By decision	9	5

Res.	Record	Opponent	Method	Event	Date	Round	Time	Location	Notes
Loss	17–9	Artem Reznikov	TKO (elbows)	ACA 192	September 14, 2025	3	3:18	Almaty, Kazakhstan	Welterweight debut.
Loss	17–8	Ayndi Umakhanov	KO (punches)	ACA 189	July 11, 2025	1	1:54	Grozny, Russia	
Loss	17–7	Bibert Tumenov	KO (punch)	ACA 182	December 14, 2024	1	3:20	Moscow, Russia	
Loss	17–6	Dan Moret	Submission (rear-naked choke)	XFC: Detroit Grand Prix 2	May 31, 2024	1	0:59	Detroit, Michigan, United States	
Loss	17–5	Natan Schulte	Decision (unanimous)	PFL 6 (2023)	June 23, 2023	3	5:00	Atlanta, Georgia, United States	
Win	17–4	Alexander Martinez	Decision (unanimous)	PFL 3 (2023)	April 14, 2023	3	5:00	Las Vegas, Nevada, United States	
Loss	16–4	Olivier Aubin-Mercier	Decision (unanimous)	PFL 4 (2022)	June 17, 2022	3	5:00	Atlanta, Georgia, United States	
Win	16–3	Don Madge	TKO (punches)	PFL 1 (2022)	April 20, 2022	3	2:42	Arlington, Texas, United States	
Win	15–3	Loik Radzhabov	Decision (unanimous)	PFL 10 (2021)	October 27, 2021	5	5:00	Hollywood, Florida, United States	Won the 2021 PFL Lightweight Tournament.
Win	14–3	Clay Collard	Decision (unanimous)	PFL 7 (2021)	August 13, 2021	3	5:00	Hollywood, Florida, United States	2021 PFL Lightweight Tournament Semifinal.
Win	13–3	Anthony Pettis	Decision (split)	PFL 6 (2021)	June 25, 2021	3	5:00	Atlantic City, New Jersey, United States	
Win	12–3	Joilton Lutterbach	Decision (split)	PFL 1 (2021)	April 23, 2021	3	5:00	Atlantic City, New Jersey, United States	
Loss	11–3	Sidney Outlaw	Decision (unanimous)	Titan FC 50	June 29, 2018	3	5:00	Fort Lauderdale, Florida, United States	Lost the Titan FC Lightweight Championship. Outlaw missed weight (159.9 lb) and was ineligible to win title.
Win	11–2	Lee Henry Lilly	Decision (unanimous)	Titan FC 48	February 16, 2018	3	5:00	Coral Gables, Florida, United States	Defended the Titan FC Lightweight Championship.
Win	10–2	Chazz Walton	KO (punch)	Titan FC 46	November 17, 2017	1	3:08	Pembroke Pines, United States	Won the Titan FC Lightweight Championship.
Win	9–2	Martin Brown	Decision (unanimous)	Titan FC 45	August 18, 2017	3	5:00	Pembroke Pines, Florida, United States	
Loss	8–2	Matt Frevola	Decision (unanimous)	Titan FC 43	January 21, 2017	3	5:00	Coral Gables, Florida, United States	
Win	8–1	Demarques Jackson	TKO (punches and elbows)	Titan FC 41	September 9, 2016	3	1:42	Coral Gables, Florida, United States	Return to Lightweight.
Win	7–1	Luis Zequeira	KO (knee)	Titan FC 39	June 10, 2016	2	4:52	Coral Gables, Florida, United States	Catchweight (150 lb) bout.
Win	6–1	Douglas Saraiva	TKO (doctor stoppage)	Gringo Super Fight 10	April 27, 2014	1	5:00	Nova Iguaçu, Brazil	Featherweight debut.
Win	5–1	Oton Jasse	Decision (unanimous)	Face to Face 6	January 21, 2014	3	5:00	Rio de Janeiro, Brazil	
Loss	4–1	Fernando dos Santos	Decision (unanimous)	Watch Out Combat Show 29	September 20, 2013	3	5:00	Rio de Janeiro, Brazil	
Win	4–0	Patrick Gomes Silva	Decision (unanimous)	Circuito Team Nogueira de MMA 3	May 24, 2013	3	5:00	Rio de Janeiro, Brazil	
Win	3–0	Tiago Rocha	TKO (punches)	Conquista Kombat Championship	November 17, 2012	2	0:53	Vitória da Conquista, Brazil	
Win	2–0	Marcilio Villas Boas	KO (knee)	Black Belt Fight	June 2, 2012	1	N/A	Vitória da Conquista, Brazil	
Win	1–0	Demetro Borges	KO (knee)	Valiant Fighters Championship 8	December 8, 2011	3	2:49	Ribeirão Preto, Brazil	Lightweight debut.

=== Mixed martial arts exhibition record ===
Exhibition record breakdown		
1 match	0 wins	1 loss
By submission	0	1

Res.	Record	Opponent	Method	Event	Date	Round	Time	Location	Notes
Loss	0–1	Glaico França	Submission (Rear-Naked Choke)	The Ultimate Fighter: Brazil 4	February 2, 2015	2	2:46	Las Vegas, United States	TUF: Brazil 4 house entry bout.

== See also ==
- List of male mixed martial artists
