= Bruno Cappelozza =

Brazilian mixed martial artist

- Born: Bruno Henrique Cappelozza; 20 May 1989 (age 37); Jaú, São Paulo, Brazil
- Height: 6 ft 2 in (1.88 m)
- Weight: 240 lb (109 kg; 17 st 2 lb)
- Division: Heavyweight; Light Heavyweight
- Reach: 79 in (201 cm)
- Fighting out of: Jau, Sao Paulo, Brazil
- Team: Corinthians MMA
- Years active: 2010–present

Mixed martial arts record
- Total: 25
- Wins: 17
- By knockout: 15
- By decision: 2
- Losses: 7
- By knockout: 2
- By submission: 3
- By decision: 1
- By disqualification: 1
- No contests: 1

Other information
- Mixed martial arts record from Sherdog

Bruno Henrique Cappelozza (born 20 May 1989) is a Brazilian mixed martial artist currently signed to the Professional Fighters League, where he competes in the heavyweight division. He is the 2021 PFL heavyweight world champion. Cappelozza has also competed in MMA promotions Rizin Fighting Federation and Jungle Fight.

== Early life ==
Cappelozza was born in Jaú, São Paulo, Brazil, where he first began to train in mixed martial arts. He commenced his martial arts journey at the age of 7, participating in disciplines such as karate, judo, and capoeira. Subsequently, he transitioned to Muay Thai, eventually making his debut in MMA.

== Mixed martial arts career ==
Cappelozza made his professional mixed martial arts debut in 2010, fighting for an MMA team owned by Brazilian soccer team Sport Club Corinthians Paulista, commonly called Corinthians. At Corinithians, Cappelozza trained with former Ultimate Fighting Championship middleweight champion Anderson Silva.

At the onset of the last decade, Cappelozza emerged as one of the promising talents in Brazilian MMA. Within his initial 10 bouts, he secured the Jungle Fight cruiserweight belt (up to 100 kg), later adding the light heavyweight belt (up to 93 kg) in 2016. Despite these achievements, his two international forays, both at Rizin Fighting Federation in Japan, ended in defeat. Notably, in July 2018, he faced future UFC Light Heavyweight champion Jiří Procházka on 28 July 2018, at Rizin 11, starting strong but ultimately succumbing to a knockout in 1 minute and 23 seconds.

Facing defeats and a series of injuries, Bruno found himself at a career crossroads. Sidelined for months due to hand, knee, and biceps surgeries, his return to the national scene was marred by opponents backing out at the last minute. Pressure from friends and family to reconsider his life direction intensified, especially as he, his wife Jéssica, and son David lived uncomfortably in his parents' house.

Bruno faced humiliation from friends and even lost some who were unsupportive. Despite his mother's suggestion to finish his physical education degree, he remained steadfast in pursuing his fighting career. During a challenging period, he crossed paths with Ronny Markes from Dominance MMA, becoming a sparring partner for Corey Anderson in the US. While the opportunity helped financially, it meant long separations from his family, causing deep emotional strain. In response to travel restrictions amid the new coronavirus pandemic, he opted to remain in Las Vegas for over eight months, which led to his opportunity to appear in the PFL Heavyweight season that commenced in April.

=== Professional Fighters League ===
==== 2021 Season ====
In 2020, Cappelozza signed with the Professional Fighters League and made his debut in the 2021 season.

Cappelozza debuted at PFL 3, scoring a 46-second KO of Ante Delija. He knocked out Muhammad DeReese in the first round of his next fight at PFL 6 to secure the No.1 seed in the 2021 PFL Playoffs.

In the Semifinals at PFL 8, Cappelozza stopped Jamelle Jones via second-round TKO to earn a place in the finals, opposite Delija, in a rematch from the 2021 PFL Regular Season.

In the PFL heavyweight championship bout at PFL 10, a back-and-forth battle with multiple knockdowns, Cappelozza defeated Delija by unanimous decision to become the 2021 PFL Heavyweight Champion.

Immediately following Cappelozza's championship win, he learned via phone that his father, Joao Cappelozza, died three days prior to the PFL Championship. His family withheld the information so he wouldn't be distracted while preparing for the fight.

==== 2022 Season ====
Cappelozza launched the 2022 season with a fight against Stuart Austin at PFL 2, which Cappeloza won in the first round with a knockout.

In June 2022, at PFL 5, Matheus Scheffel defeated Cappelozza via unanimous decision, in a surprising upset. Despite that loss, Cappelozza still advanced to the playoffs, due to his earlier KO. That fight was nominated for "Upset of the Year" in the World MMA Awards.

In July 2022, ESPN reported that Cappelozza would no longer compete in the PFL playoffs due to an undisclosed injury. He was replaced by Mattheus Scheffel in the semifinal fight against Denis Goltsov.

==== 2023 Season ====
Cappelozza started off the 2023 PFL season in a rematch against Matheus Scheffel on 7 April 2023, at PFL 2. He won the fight via TKO in the first round. On 9 May 2023, it was announced that Cappelozza had failed a commission drug test and was pulled from the season. At the NAC meeting that month, it was announced that Cappelozza was suspended 9 months for testing positive for Drostanolone and the victory was overturned to a no contest. He was eligible to return on 7 January 2024.

==== 2024 Season ====
Cappelozza faced former Bellator Light Heavyweight Champion Vadim Nemkov on 24 February 2024, at PFL vs. Bellator. He lost by arm-triangle submission in the second round.

Cappelozza was scheduled to face Sergei Bilostenniy on 4 April 2024 at PFL 1. However, a week before the event it was announced that he had pulled out.

On 13 August 2024, it was reported that Cappeloza had been suspended for clomiphene and its metabolite desethyl-clomifene as a result of a urine sample collected out-of-competition on 17 April 2024. He was given a 1 year suspension and will be eligible to compete again on 17 April 2025.

==== 2026 ====
After winning at the independent promotion, Cappelozza was scheduled to face Valentin Moldavsky on July 25, 2026, at PFL Washington DC. However, Cappelozza not compete at this event due to visa issues and the bout was moved to PFL Charlotte on August 7, 2026. Cappelozza won the fight via unanimous decision.

== Championships and accomplishments ==
=== Mixed martial arts ===
- Professional Fighters League
  - 2021 PFL Heavyweight Championship

== Mixed martial arts record ==
Professional record breakdown
25 matches	17 wins	7 losses
By knockout	15	2
By submission	0	3
By decision	2	1
By disqualification	0	1
No contests	1	

Res.	Record	Opponent	Method	Event	Date	Round	Time	Location	Notes
Win	17–7 (1)	Valentin Moldavsky	Decision (unanimous)	PFL Charlotte: Battle vs. Rosta	7 August 2026	3	5:00	Charlotte, North Carolina, United States	Return to Light Heavyweight.
Win	16–7 (1)	Rodrigo Duarte	TKO (retirement)	Falcon MMA 4	27 September 2025	1	4:06	Rio de Janeiro, Brazil	
Loss	15–7 (1)	Vadim Nemkov	Technical Submission (arm-triangle choke)	PFL vs. Bellator	24 February 2024	2	2:13	Riyadh, Saudi Arabia	
NC	15–6 (1)	Matheus Scheffel	NC (overturned)	PFL 2 (2023)	7 April 2023	1	2:15	Las Vegas, Nevada, United States	Originally a TKO (punches) win for Cappelozza; overturned after he tested positive for drostanolone.
Loss	15–6	Matheus Scheffel	Decision (unanimous)	PFL 5 (2022)	24 June 2022	3	5:00	Atlanta, Georgia, United States	
Win	15–5	Stuart Austin	TKO (punches)	PFL 2 (2022)	28 April 2022	1	4:24	Arlington, Texas, United States	
Win	14–5	Ante Delija	Decision (unanimous)	PFL 10 (2021)	27 October 2021	5	5:00	Hollywood, Florida, United States	Won the 2021 PFL Heavyweight Tournament.
Win	13–5	Jamelle Jones	TKO (punches)	PFL 8 (2021)	19 August 2021	2	1:33	Hollywood, Florida, United States	2021 PFL Heavyweight Tournament Semifinal.
Win	12–5	Muhammed DeReese	TKO (punch and head kick)	PFL 6 (2021)	25 June 2021	1	2:21	Atlantic City, New Jersey, United States	
Win	11–5	Ante Delija	KO (punches)	PFL 3 (2021)	6 May 2021	1	0:46	Atlantic City, New Jersey, United States	Return to Heavyweight.
Loss	10–5	Jiří Procházka	KO (punches)	Rizin 11	28 July 2018	1	1:23	Saitama, Japan	
Win	10–4	Lucas Rosa	TKO (punches)	Gladiator MMA 3	16 October 2017	1	3:02	Jaú, Brazil	
Win	9–4	Devani Martins Jr.	TKO (knee and punches)	Demolidor Fight 10	12 August 2017	1	0:07	Bauru, Brazil	Won the vacant DFMMA Light Heavyweight Championship.
Win	8–4	Klidson Abreu	TKO (punches)	Jungle Fight 87	21 May 2016	3	3:08	São Paulo, Brazil	Return to Light Heavyweight. Won the vacant Jungle Fight Light Heavyweight Championship.
Loss	7–4	Teodoras Aukštuolis	KO (punch)	Rizin World Grand Prix 2015: Part 1 - Saraba	29 December 2015	1	3:32	Saitama, Japan	Heavyweight debut. 2015 Rizin Heavyweight Grand Prix Quarterfinal.
Win	7–3	Francisco Sandro Bezerra	TKO (punches)	Jungle Fight 82	24 October 2015	1	4:17	São Paulo, Brazil	Won the vacant Jungle Fight 220 lbs Championship.
Win	6–3	Marco Talebi Paulo	KO (punches)	Gladiator MMA 2	18 July 2015	1	0:20	Jaú, Brazil	
Win	5–3	David Teixeira	TKO	Gladiator MMA 1	25 October 2014	2	N/A	Jaú, Brazil	
Win	4–3	Vagner Curió	TKO (punches)	Real Fight 9	15 June 2013	1	N/A	São José dos Campos, Brazil	
Loss	3–3	Emiliano Sordi	Submission (guillotine choke)	Jungle Fight 35	17 December 2011	1	0:34	Rio de Janeiro, Brazil	
Win	3–2	Dirlei Broenstrup	TKO (retirement)	Jungle Fight 32	10 September 2011	3	2:46	São Paulo, Brazil	
Win	2–2	Jackson Mora	KO (punches)	Jungle Fight 28	21 May 2011	1	4:28	Rio de Janeiro, Brazil	
Win	1–2	Marcelo Cruz	TKO (leg kicks and punches)	Jungle Fight 26	2 April 2011	3	1:53	São Paulo, Brazil	
Loss	0–2	Nelson Martins	DQ (illegal punches)	Jungle Fight 24	18 December 2010	1	1:58	Rio de Janeiro, Brazil	
Loss	0–1	João Paulo Pereira	Submission (arm-triangle choke)	Predador FC 17	11 December 2010	1	3:34	Jaú, Brazil	Light Heavyweight debut.

== See also ==
- List of current PFL fighters
- List of male mixed martial artists
