= PFL 2 (2019) =

Professional Fighters League MMA event in 2019

- The poster for PFL 2
- Promotion: Professional Fighters League
- Date: May 23, 2019
- Venue: Nassau Coliseum
- City: Uniondale, New York

Event chronology
PFL 1	PFL 2	PFL 3

The PFL 2 mixed martial arts event for the 2019 season of the Professional Fighters League was held on May 23, 2019, at the Nassau Coliseum in Uniondale, New York. This was the second regular season event of 2019 and included fights in the featherweight and lightweight divisions.

== Background ==
At the weigh-ins, Alexandre Bezerra and Alexandre de Almeida both missed weight for their featherweight bouts. As a result, both fighters were pulled from the card and their respective opponents - Jeremy Kennedy and Luis Rafael Laurentino - faced each other on the preliminary card.

Ramsey Nijem was expected to face Ronys Torres at this event. However, Torres failed his medical tests prior to the weigh-ins and the bout was cancelled. Nijem was awarded three points toward a potential playoff spot.

== Results ==
Main Card (ESPN+)
Weight class				Method	Round	Time	Notes
Featherweight	Lance Palmer	def.	Alex Gilpin	Decision (unanimous) (30-27, 30-27, 30-27)	3	5:00
Lightweight	Chris Wade	def.	Nate Andrews	Decision (unanimous) (30-27, 29-28, 29-28)	3	5:00
Featherweight	Andre Harrison	def.	Peter Petties	Decision (unanimous) (30-27, 30-27, 30-27)	3	5:00
Lightweight	Akhmet Aliev	def.	Carlos Silva	KO (punches)	1	2:24
Lightweight	Islam Mamedov	def.	Ylies Djiroun	Decision (split) (29-28, 28-29, 29-28)	3	5:00
Lightweight	Rashid Magomedov	def.	Loik Radzhabov	Decision (unanimous) (30-27, 30-27, 30-27)	3	5:00
Preliminary Card (ESPN 2)
Lightweight	Natan Schulte	def.	Yincang Bao	Submission (rear-naked choke)	1	3:03
Featherweight	Luis Rafael Laurentino	def.	Jeremy Kennedy	TKO (head kick and punches)	1	0:23
Featherweight	Movlid Khaybulaev	def.	Damon Jackson	KO (flying knee)	1	0:10
Featherweight	Gadzhi Rabadanov	def.	Steven Siler	Decision (unanimous) (30-27, 29-28, 30-27)	3	5:00

== Standings After Event ==
The point system consists of outcome based scoring and bonuses for an early win. Under the outcome based scoring system, the winner of a fight receives 3 points and the loser receives 0 points. If the fight ends in a draw, both fighters will receive 1 point. The bonus for winning a fight in the first, second, or third round is 3 points, 2 points, and 1 point respectively. For example, if a fighter wins a fight in the first round, then the fighter will receive 6 total points. If a fighter misses weight, then the fighter that missed weight will receive 0 points and his opponent will receive 3 points due to a walkover victory.

=== Featherweight ===
Fighter	Wins	Draws	Losses	1st	2nd	3rd	Total Points (Note: The eight fighters with most points advance to the playoffs)
Movlid Khaybulaev	1	0	0	1	0	0	6
Luis Rafael Laurentino	1	0	0	1	0	0	6
Andre Harrison	1	0	0	0	0	0	3
Lance Palmer	1	0	0	0	0	0	3
Gadzhi Rabadanov	1	0	0	0	0	0	3
Steven Siler	0	0	1	0	0	0	0
Alex Gilpin	0	0	1	0	0	0	0
Peter Petties	0	0	1	0	0	0	0
Jeremy Kennedy	0	0	1	0	0	0	0
Damon Jackson	0	0	1	0	0	0	0
Alexandre Bezerra	0	0	0	0	0	0	0
Alexandre de Almeida	0	0	0	0	0	0	0

=== Lightweight ===
Fighter	Wins	Draws	Losses	1st	2nd	3rd	Total Points (Note: The eight fighters with most points advance to the playoffs)
Akhmet Aliev	1	0	0	1	0	0	6
Natan Schulte	1	0	0	1	0	0	6
Rashid Magomedov	1	0	0	0	0	0	3
Chris Wade	1	0	0	0	0	0	3
Islam Mamedov	1	0	0	0	0	0	3
Ramsey Nijem	1	0	0	0	0	0	3
Ylies Djiroun	0	0	1	0	0	0	0
Nate Andrews	0	0	1	0	0	0	0
Loik Radzhabov	0	0	1	0	0	0	0
Yincang Bao	0	0	1	0	0	0	0
Carlos Silva	0	0	0	0	0	0	0
Ronys Torres	0	0	1	0	0	0	0

== See also ==
- List of PFL events
- List of current PFL fighters
