= PFL 1 (2022) =

Professional Fighters League MMA event in 2022

- The poster for PFL 1
- Promotion: Professional Fighters League
- Date: April 20, 2022
- Venue: Esports Stadium Arlington
- City: Arlington, Texas

Event chronology
PFL 10	PFL 1	PFL 2

The PFL 1 mixed martial arts event for the 2022 season of the Professional Fighters League was held on April 20, 2022 at the Esports Stadium Arlington in Arlington, Texas. This marked the first regular season event of the tournament and included fights in the Lightweight and Light Heavyweight divisions.

== Background ==
The event was headlined by a lightweight clash between Clay Collard and UFC veteran Jeremy Stephens, while 2021 champion Raush Manfio faces two-time UFC veteran Don Madge in the co-main event. The remaining two fights of the main card saw defending light heavyweight champion Antônio Carlos Júnior face off against Delan Monte, while 2019 champion Natan Schulte took on Olivier Aubin-Mercier.

A lightweight bout between former WEC and UFC Lightweight Champion Anthony Pettis and Bellator veteran Myles Price was scheduled for the event but the bout was later moved to PFL 3.

== Results ==
Main Card (ESPN/ESPN+)
Weight class				Method	Round	Time	Notes
Lightweight	Clay Collard	def.	Jeremy Stephens	Decision (unanimous) (30–27, 30–27, 30–27)	3	5:00
Lightweight	Raush Manfio	def.	Don Madge	TKO (punches)	3	2:42
Light Heavyweight	Antônio Carlos Júnior	def.	Delan Monte	Submission (brabo choke)	1	0:29
Lightweight	Olivier Aubin-Mercier	def.	Natan Schulte	Decision (split) (28–29, 29–28, 29–28)	3	5:00
Preliminary card (ESPN+)
Light Heavyweight	Cory Hendricks	def.	Emiliano Sordi	TKO (punches)	2	2:13
Lightweight	Alexander Martinez	def.	Stevie Ray	Decision (unanimous) (30–27, 29–28, 30–27)	3	5:00
Light Heavyweight	Marthin Hamlet	def.	Teodoras Aukštuolis	Decision (unanimous) (30-27, 30-27, 30-27)	3	5:00
Light Heavyweight	Omari Akhmedov	def.	Viktor Pešta	KO (punches)	1	1:25
Light Heavyweight	Rob Wilkinson	def.	Bruce Souto	TKO (punches)	2	0:46
Light Heavyweight	Simeon Powell	def.	Clinton Williams	KO (knee)	3	4:38

== Standings After Event ==
The PFL points system is based on results of the match. The winner of a fight receives 3 points. If the fight ends in a draw, both fighters will receive 1 point. The bonus for winning a fight in the first, second, or third round is 3 points, 2 points, and 1 point respectively. The bonus for winning in the third round requires a fight be stopped before 4:59 of the third round. No bonus point will be awarded if a fighter wins via decision. For example, if a fighter wins a fight in the first round, then the fighter will receive 6 total points. A decision win will result in three total points. If a fighter misses weight, the opponent (should they comply with weight limits) will receive 3 points due to a walkover victory, regardless of winning or losing the bout; if the non-offending fighter subsequently wins with a stoppage, all bonus points will be awarded.

=== Light Heavyweight ===
Fighter	Wins	Draws	Losses	1st	2nd	3rd	Total Points (Note: The four fighters with most points advance to the playoffs)
Antônio Carlos Júnior	1	0	0	1	0	0	6
Omari Akhmedov	1	0	0	1	0	0	6
Rob Wilkinson	1	0	0	0	1	0	5
Cory Hendricks	1	0	0	0	1	0	5
Marthin Hamlet	1	0	0	0	0	0	3
Teodoras Aukštuolis	0	0	1	0	0	0	0
Emiliano Sordi	0	0	1	0	0	0	0
Bruce Souto	0	0	1	0	0	0	0
Viktor Pešta	0	0	1	0	0	0	0
Delan Monte	0	0	1	0	0	0	0

=== Lightweight ===
Fighter	Wins	Draws	Losses	1st	2nd	3rd	Total Points (Note: The four fighters with most points advance to the playoffs)
Raush Manfio	1	0	0	0	0	1	4
Clay Collard	1	0	0	0	0	0	3
Alex Martinez	1	0	0	0	0	0	3
Olivier Aubin-Mercier	1	0	0	0	0	0	3
Natan Schulte	0	0	1	0	0	0	0
Stevie Ray	0	0	1	0	0	0	0
Jeremy Stephens	0	0	1	0	0	0	0
Don Madge	0	0	1	0	0	0	0
Anthony Pettis	0	0	0	0	0	0	0
Myles Price	0	0	0	0	0	0	0

== See also ==
- List of PFL events
- List of current PFL fighters
