= PFL 10 (2021) =

Professional Fighters League mixed martial arts event in 2021

- The poster for PFL 10
- Promotion: Professional Fighters League
- Date: October 27, 2021
- Venue: Seminole Hard Rock Hotel & Casino Hollywood
- City: Hollywood, Florida, United States

Event chronology
PFL 9	PFL 10	PFL 1

The PFL 10 mixed martial arts event for the 2021 season of the Professional Fighters League was held on October 27, 2021. This was the finale of the playoffs for all divisions, with the winners getting $1 million cash prize.

== Background ==
Kayla Harrison, a two-time Olympic gold medalist in judo and is seeking her second PFL championship, headlined the PFL event opposite Taylor Guardado, who emerged as an unexpected finalist in 2021. The event also featured five other finals matchups, with the winner of each weight class taking home PFL's trademark $1 million prize.

The five other championship bouts included a welterweight rematch between Ray Cooper III and Magomed Magomedkerimov, Movlid Khaybulaev versus UFC vet Chris Wade at featherweight, a heavyweight rematch between Ante Delija and Bruno Cappelozza, UFC vet Antônio Carlos Júnior taking on Marthin Hamlet at light heavyweight, and Loik Radzhabov rematching Raush Manfio at lightweight.

This PFL event featured the second MMA appearance of boxing champion Claressa Shields. Shields, who won her professional MMA debut in June, took on Mexico's Abigail Montes.

Former UFC middleweight Omari Akhmedov made a non-tournament appearance on the card. The 33-year-old Russian, who fought exclusively in the UFC from 2013 to 2021, faced Jordan Young on the night's undercard.

== Results ==
Main Card (ESPN2 and ESPN+)
Weight class				Method	Round	Time	Notes
Women's Lightweight	Kayla Harrison	def.	Taylor Guardado	Submission (armbar)	2	4:00	(Note: For the 2021 PFL Women's Lightweight Championship.)
Welterweight	Ray Cooper III	def.	Magomed Magomedkerimov	KO (punches)	3	3:02	(Note: For the 2021 PFL Welterweight Championship.)
Women's Lightweight	Abigail Montes	def.	Claressa Shields	Decision (split) (28-29, 29-28, 29-28)	3	5:00
Heavyweight	Bruno Cappelozza	def.	Ante Delija	Decision (unanimous) (49-45, 49-45, 48-46)	5	5:00	(Note: For the 2021 PFL Heavyweight Championship.)
Featherweight	Movlid Khaybulaev	def.	Chris Wade	Decision (unanimous) (50-45, 50-45, 50-45)	5	5:00	(Note: For the 2021 PFL Featherweight Championship.)
Preliminary card (ESPN+)
Light Heavyweight	Antônio Carlos Júnior	def.	Marthin Hamlet	Submission (rear-naked choke)	1	3:49	(Note: For the 2021 PFL Light Heavyweight Championship.)
Lightweight	Raush Manfio	def.	Loik Radzhabov	Decision (unanimous) (48-46, 48-46, 49-46)	5	5:00	(Note: For the 2021 PFL Lightweight Championship.)
Light Heavyweight	Jordan Young	def.	Omari Akhmedov	TKO (punches)	3	1:32
Women's Lightweight	Julia Budd	def.	Kaitlin Young	Decision (unanimous) (30-27, 30-27, 30-27)	3	5:00
Lightweight	Don Madge	def.	Nathan Williams	Submission (rear-naked choke)	2	2:15

== 2021 PFL Heavyweight playoffs ==
Semifinals
1	(Brazil) Bruno Cappelozza	TKO
4	(United States) Jamelle Jones	2
2	(Russia) Denis Goltsov	3
3	(Croatia) Ante Delija	UD

Finals
1	(Brazil) Bruno Cappelozza	UD
3	(Croatia) Ante Delija	5

Legend
(SD)	(Split Decision)
(UD)	(Unanimous Decision)
(MD)	(Majority Decision)
SUB	Submission
(T)KO	(Technical) Knock Out
L	Loss

== 2021 PFL Light Heavyweight playoffs ==
Semifinals
1	(Brazil) Antônio Carlos Júnior	UD
4	(Argentina) Emiliano Sordi	3
2	(Brazil) Cezar Ferreira	1
3	(Norway) Marthin Hamlet	TKO

Finals
1	(Brazil) Antônio Carlos Júnior	SUB
3	(Norway) Marthin Hamlet	1

Legend
(SD)	(Split Decision)
(UD)	(Unanimous Decision)
(MD)	(Majority Decision)
SUB	Submission
(T)KO	(Technical) Knock Out
L	Loss

== 2021 PFL Welterweight playoffs ==
Semifinals
5	(Sweden) Sadibou Sy*	3
4	(Russia) Magomed Magomedkerimov	UD
2	(Canada) Rory MacDonald	3
3	(United States) Ray Cooper III	UD

Finals
4	(Russia) Magomed Magomedkerimov	3
3	(United States) Ray Cooper III	KO

- João Zeferino was originally scheduled to face Magomed Magomedkerimov but was unable to continue in the tournament. He was replaced by #5 ranked Sadibou Sy.

Legend
(SD)	(Split Decision)
(UD)	(Unanimous Decision)
(MD)	(Majority Decision)
SUB	Submission
(T)KO	(Technical) Knock Out
L	Loss

== 2021 PFL Lightweight playoffs ==
Semifinals
1	(Tajikistan) Loik Radzhabov	UD
4	(Paraguay) Alexander Martinez	3
2	(United States) Clay Collard	3
3	(Brazil) Raush Manfio	UD

Finals
1	(Tajikistan) Loik Radzhabov	5
3	(Brazil) Raush Manfio	UD

Legend
(SD)	(Split Decision)
(UD)	(Unanimous Decision)
(MD)	(Majority Decision)
SUB	Submission
(T)KO	(Technical) Knock Out
L	Loss

== 2021 PFL Featherweight playoffs ==
Semifinals
1	(England) Brendan Loughnane	3
4	(Russia) Movlid Khaybulaev	SD
2	(United States) Chris Wade	UD
3	(United States) Bubba Jenkins	3

Finals
4	(Russia) Movlid Khaybulaev	UD
2	(United States) Chris Wade	5

Legend
(SD)	(Split Decision)
(UD)	(Unanimous Decision)
(MD)	(Majority Decision)
SUB	Submission
(T)KO	(Technical) Knock Out
L	Loss

== 2021 PFL Women's Lightweight playoffs ==
Semifinals
5	(Brazil) Mariana Morais	3
4	(United States) Taylor Guardado	SD
2	(United States) Kayla Harrison	TKO
3	(New Zealand) Genah Fabian	1

Finals
4	(United States) Taylor Guardado	2
2	(United States) Kayla Harrison	SUB

* Larissa Pacheco was originally scheduled to face Taylor Guardado but was unable to continue in the tournament. She was replaced by #5 ranked Mariana Morais.

Legend
(SD)	(Split Decision)
(UD)	(Unanimous Decision)
(MD)	(Majority Decision)
SUB	Submission
(T)KO	(Technical) Knock Out
L	Loss

== See also ==
- List of PFL events
- List of current PFL fighters
