= Chris Wade (fighter) =

American mixed martial arts fighter

- Born: Christopher Wade; September 30, 1987 (age 39); Oakwood, Illinois, U.S.
- Nickname: The Long Island Killer
- Height: 5 ft 9 in (1.75 m)
- Weight: 145 lb (66 kg; 10.4 st)
- Division: Featherweight; Lightweight
- Reach: 70.0 in (178 cm)
- Fighting out of: Islip, New York, U.S.
- Team: Long Island MMA; Studio 42 Kickboxing
- Rank: Brown belt in Brazilian Jiu-Jitsu under Gregg DePasquale
- Wrestling: NCAA Division III Wrestling
- Years active: 2011–2025

Mixed martial arts record
- Total: 33
- Wins: 23
- By knockout: 2
- By submission: 6
- By decision: 15
- Losses: 10
- By decision: 10

Other information
- Website: chriswademma.com
- Mixed martial arts record from Sherdog

Christopher Wade (born September 30, 1987) is an American former professional mixed martial artist, who competed in the Featherweight division. A professional competitor since 2011, Wade has also competed in the UFC and Professional Fighters League (PFL).

== Background ==
Wade was born on September 30, 1987, in Rockville Centre, New York. A talented wrestler, Wade attended Islip High School, where he was a state champion (140 lbs.) as well as a two-time Suffolk County finalist and a Suffolk County Champion. Wade continued his career at the collegiate level where he was a NJCAA National finalist for Nassau Community College, losing to future UFC Welterweight title challenger Colby Covington 15–3. As well, Wade was an NCAA Division III fifth-place finish for SUNY Oneonta. Wade also competed in amateur kickboxing, where was undefeated and held a title.

== Mixed martial arts career ==
=== Early career ===
Wade had an amateur MMA record of 2-0 before turning professional in 2011. Wade then compiled a professional record of 5-0 and won the Ring of Combat Lightweight Championship before being signed by the World Series of Fighting.

=== World Series of Fighting ===
Wade made his WSOF debut at WSOF 2 on March 23, 2013, against Russian prospect Azamat Dugulubgov. Wade lost the fight via unanimous decision.

=== Independent promotions ===
Wade returned to the local circuit and won both of his next two fights before being signed by the UFC.

=== Ultimate Fighting Championship ===
Wade made his promotional debut against Cain Carrizosa on August 30, 2014, at UFC 177. Wade won the fight via technical submission from a guillotine choke in the first round.

Wade faced Zhang Lipeng on January 18, 2015, at UFC Fight Night 59. Wade won the fight via unanimous decision.

Wade faced Christos Giagos on June 6, 2015, at UFC Fight Night 68. He won the fight by unanimous decision.

Wade was expected to face Olivier Aubin-Mercier on August 23, 2015, at UFC Fight Night 74. However, Wade pulled out of the fight in late July, after sustaining an injury, and he was replaced by Tony Sims.

Wade was expected to face Mairbek Taisumov on January 17, 2016, at UFC Fight Night 81, replacing an injured Beneil Dariush. Subsequently, Taisumov was pulled from the fight during the week leading to the event due to alleged visa issues, and he was replaced by promotional newcomer Mehdi Baghdad. Wade won the fight via submission in the first round.

Wade was expected to face Rashid Magomedov on May 8, 2016, at UFC Fight Night 87. However, Magomedov pulled out of the fight in early March, and he was replaced by Rustam Khabilov. Wade lost the fight via unanimous decision.

Wade next faced Islam Makhachev on September 17, 2016, at UFC Fight Night 94. He lost the fight via unanimous decision.

Wade faced Frankie Perez in a rematch on July 22, 2017, at UFC on Fox 25. He won the fight by unanimous decision with the score board of (29-28, 29–28, 30–27).

=== Professional Fighters League ===
Wade subsequently parted ways with UFC following the bout and signed a contract with PFL in early 2018.

==== PFL inaugural season ====
Wade made his promotional debut against Natan Schulte at PFL 2 on June 21, 2018. Wade lost the fight via unanimous decision.

Wade then faced Yuki Kawana at PFL 5 on August 2, 2018. He won the fight via first-round guillotine choke submission.

Wade advanced to the playoffs and faced Robert Watley in the opening round on October 13, 2018. Wade won the fight via majority decision and advanced to the semifinals.

In the semifinals, Wade faced Natan Schulte again in a split decision losing effort and was eliminated from the tournament.

==== PFL Season 2019 ====
In early 2019, it was announced that Wade will be participating in the PFL season 2019 lightweight tournament.

Wade's first appearance of the season took place against Nate Andrews at PFL 2 on May 23, 2019. He won the fight via unanimous decision.

Wade then faced Akhmet Aliev at PFL 5 on July 25, 2019. He won the fight via unanimous decision.

With two wins in the regular season, Wade advanced to the playoffs where he faced Nate Andrews in a rematch at PFL 8 on October 17, 2019. He won the fight via majority decision and advanced to the semifinals.

In the semifinal on the same day, Wade faced Loik Radzhabov and lost via unanimous decision and was eliminated from the tournament.

==== PFL Season 2021 ====
Wade returned to PFL for the 2021 season, moving down a weight class to featherweight.

Wade faced Anthony Dizy on April 23, 2021, at PFL 1. He won the bout via unanimous decision.

Wade faced Arman Ospanov at PFL 4 on June 10, 2021. He won the bout via knockout after landing a head kick and finishing Ospanov with punches in the second round.

Wade faced Bubba Jenkins in the Semifinals off the Featherweight tournament on August 27, 2021, at PFL 9. He won the bout via unanimous decision.

Wade faced Movlid Khaybulaev in the Finals of the Featherweight tournament on October 27, 2021, at PFL 10. He lost the bout via unanimous decision.

==== PFL Season 2022 ====
Wade faced Lance Palmer on April 28, 2022, at PFL 2. He won the bout via unanimous decision.

Wade faced Kyle Bochniak on June 24, 2022, at PFL 5. He won the bout via head kick and then ground and pound TKO in the first round.

Wade faced Brendan Loughnane in the Semifinals off the Featherweight tournament on August 20, 2022, at PFL 9. He lost the bout via unanimous decision.

==== PFL Season 2023 ====
Wade started off the 2023 season in a rematch against Bubba Jenkins on April 1, 2023, at PFL 1. He lost the bout via unanimous decision.

Wade faced Ryoji Kudo on June 8, 2023, at PFL 4. He won the fight via a technical submission due to a guillotine choke in the first round.

In the Featherweight semi-finals, Wade replaced 2021 PFL champion Movlid Khaybulaev against Gabriel Alves Braga at PFL 7 on August 4, 2023, losing the fight via split decision.

Wade was scheduled to rematch Bubba Jenkins on November 24, 2023 at PFL 10, however at weigh-ins, Wade came in at148.4 pounds, which was 2.4 pounds north of the non-title. Jenkins turned down the catchweight bout and the bout was scrapped.

Wade was scheduled to face Bubba Jenkins in a trilogy bout on November 24, 2023, at PFL 10. At the weigh-ins, Wade came in at 148.4 pounds, 2.4 pounds over the featherweight limit. As a results, Jenkins turned down the catchweight bout and the bout was scrapped.

On June 9, 2025, Wade announced his retirement from mixed martial arts competition.

== Mixed martial arts record ==
Professional record breakdown
33 matches	23 wins	10 losses
By knockout	2	0
By submission	6	0
By decision	15	10

Res.	Record	Opponent	Method	Event	Date	Round	Time	Location	Notes
Loss	23–10	Gabriel Alves Braga	Decision (split)	PFL 7 (2022)	August 4, 2023	3	5:00	San Antonio, Texas, United States	2023 PFL Featherweight Tournament Semifinal.
Win	23–9	Ryoji Kudo	Technical Submission (guillotine choke)	PFL 4 (2023)	June 8, 2023	1	4:15	Atlanta, Georgia, United States	
Loss	22–9	Bubba Jenkins	Decision (unanimous)	PFL 1 (2023)	April 1, 2023	3	5:00	Las Vegas, Nevada, United States	
Loss	22–8	Brendan Loughnane	Decision (unanimous)	PFL 9 (2022)	August 20, 2022	3	5:00	London, England	2022 PFL Featherweight Tournament Semifinal.
Win	22–7	Kyle Bochniak	TKO (head kick and punches)	PFL 5 (2022)	June 24, 2022	1	1:10	Atlanta, Georgia, United States	
Win	21–7	Lance Palmer	Decision (unanimous)	PFL 2 (2022)	April 28, 2022	3	5:00	Arlington, Texas, United States	
Loss	20–7	Movlid Khaybulaev	Decision (unanimous)	PFL 10 (2021)	October 27, 2021	5	5:00	Hollywood, Florida, United States	2021 PFL Featherweight Tournament Final.
Win	20–6	Bubba Jenkins	Decision (unanimous)	PFL 9 (2021)	August 27, 2021	3	5:00	Hollywood, Florida, United States	2021 PFL Featherweight Tournament Semifinal.
Win	19–6	Arman Ospanov	KO (head kick and punches)	PFL 4 (2021)	June 10, 2021	2	2:18	Atlantic City, New Jersey, United States	
Win	18–6	Anthony Dizy	Decision (unanimous)	PFL 1 (2021)	April 23, 2021	3	5:00	Atlantic City, New Jersey, United States	Featherweight debut.
Loss	17–6	Loik Radzhabov	Decision (unanimous)	PFL 8 (2019)	October 17, 2019	3	5:00	Las Vegas, Nevada, United States	2019 PFL Lightweight Tournament Semifinal.
Win	17–5	Nate Andrews	Decision (majority)	PFL 8 (2019)	October 17, 2019	2	5:00	Las Vegas, Nevada, United States	2019 PFL Lightweight Tournament Quarterfinal.
Win	16–5	Akhmet Aliev	Decision (unanimous)	PFL 5 (2019)	July 25, 2019	3	5:00	Atlantic City, New Jersey, United States	
Win	15–5	Nate Andrews	Decision (unanimous)	PFL 2 (2019)	May 23, 2019	3	5:00	Uniondale, New York, United States	
Loss	14–5	Natan Schulte	Decision (split)	PFL 9 (2018)	October 13, 2018	3	5:00	Long Beach, California, United States	2018 PFL Lightweight Tournament Semifinal.
Win	14–4	Robert Watley	Decision (majority)	PFL 9 (2018)	October 13, 2018	2	5:00	Long Beach, California, United States	2018 PFL Lightweight Tournament Quarterfinal.
Win	13–4	Yuki Kawana	Submission (guillotine choke)	PFL 5 (2018)	August 2, 2018	1	4:24	Uniondale, New York, United States	
Loss	12–4	Natan Schulte	Decision (unanimous)	PFL 2 (2018)	June 21, 2018	3	5:00	Chicago, Illinois, United States	
Win	12–3	Frankie Perez	Decision (unanimous)	UFC on Fox: Weidman vs. Gastelum	July 22, 2017	3	5:00	Uniondale, New York, United States	
Loss	11–3	Islam Makhachev	Decision (unanimous)	UFC Fight Night: Poirier vs. Johnson	September 17, 2016	3	5:00	Hidalgo, Texas, United States	
Loss	11–2	Rustam Khabilov	Decision (unanimous)	UFC Fight Night: Overeem vs. Arlovski	May 8, 2016	3	5:00	Rotterdam, Netherlands	
Win	11–1	Mehdi Baghdad	Submission (rear-naked choke)	UFC Fight Night: Dillashaw vs. Cruz	January 17, 2016	1	4:30	Boston, Massachusetts, United States	
Win	10–1	Christos Giagos	Decision (unanimous)	UFC Fight Night: Boetsch vs. Henderson	June 6, 2015	3	5:00	New Orleans, Louisiana, United States	
Win	9–1	Zhang Lipeng	Decision (unanimous)	UFC Fight Night: McGregor vs. Siver	January 18, 2015	3	5:00	Boston, Massachusetts, United States	
Win	8–1	Cain Carrizosa	Technical Submission (guillotine choke)	UFC 177	August 30, 2014	1	1:12	Sacramento, California, United States	
Win	7–1	Frankie Perez	Decision (split)	Ring of Combat 48	May 16, 2014	3	5:00	Atlantic City, New Jersey, United States	Defended the ROC Lightweight Championship.
Win	6–1	Pat DeFranco	Submission (rear-naked choke)	Ring of Combat 47	January 24, 2014	2	2:31	Atlantic City, New Jersey, United States	Won the ROC Lightweight Championship.
Loss	5–1	Azamat Dugulugbov	Decision (unanimous)	WSOF 2	March 23, 2013	3	5:00	Atlantic City, New Jersey, United States	Catchweight (160 lb) bout.
Win	5–0	Mike Medrano	Decision (unanimous)	Ring of Combat 43	January 24, 2013	3	4:00	Atlantic City, New Jersey, United States	
Win	4–0	Alfred Walker	Submission (guillotine choke)	Ring of Combat 42	September 14, 2012	1	0:59	Atlantic City, New Jersey, United States	
Win	3–0	Villi Bello	Decision (unanimous)	Ring of Combat 41	June 15, 2012	3	4:00	Atlantic City, New Jersey, United States	
Win	2–0	Maykon Santos	Decision (unanimous)	Ring of Combat 40	April 27, 2012	2	4:00	Atlantic City, New Jersey, United States	Lightweight debut.
Win	1–0	Vinicius Agudo	Decision (unanimous)	Ring of Combat 38	November 18, 2011	2	4:00	Atlantic City, New Jersey, United States	Welterweight debut.

== See also ==
- List of male mixed martial artists
