= PFL 4 (2022) =

Professional Fighters League MMA event in 2022

- The poster for PFL 4
- Promotion: Professional Fighters League
- Date: June 17, 2022
- Venue: Overtime Elite Arena
- City: Atlanta, Georgia

Event chronology
PFL 3	PFL 4	PFL 5

The PFL 4 mixed martial arts event for the 2022 season of the Professional Fighters League was held on June 17, 2022 at the Overtime Elite Arena in Atlanta, Georgia. This marked the fourth regular season event of the tournament and included fights in the Lightweight and Light Heavyweight divisions.

== Background ==
The event was headlined by a lightweight clash between Clay Collard and Alexander Martinez, while defending light heavyweight champion Antônio Carlos Júnior faces off against Bruce Souto in the co-main event. The remaining two fights off the main card include 2021 champion Raush Manfio taking on former UFC veteran Olivier Aubin-Mercier, while long-time UFC veteran Jeremy Stephens takes on Myles Price.

== Results ==
Main Card (ESPN/ESPN+)
Weight class				Method	Round	Time	Notes
Lightweight	Alexander Martinez	def.	Clay Collard	Decision (split) (29–28, 28–29, 29–28)	3	5:00
Light Heavyweight	Antônio Carlos Júnior	def.	Bruce Souto	Decision (unanimous) (30–27, 30–27, 30–27)	3	5:00
Lightweight	Olivier Aubin-Mercier	def.	Raush Manfio	Decision (unanimous) (30-27, 30-27, 29-28)	3	5:00
Lightweight	Jeremy Stephens	def.	Myles Price	Decision (split) (29-28, 29-28, 28-29)	3	5:00
Preliminary card (ESPN+)
Light Heavyweight	Omari Akhmedov	def.	Teodoras Aukštuolis	Technical Submission (arm-triangle choke)	2	2:50
Lightweight	Natan Schulte	def.	Marcin Held	Decision (unanimous) (30-27, 30-27, 29-28)	3	5:00
Light Heavyweight	Delan Monte	def.	Emiliano Sordi	TKO (punches)	1	1:32
Light Heavyweight	Rob Wilkinson	def.	Viktor Pešta	TKO (punches)	1	3:03
Light Heavyweight	Josh Silveira	def.	Marthin Hamlet	TKO (knee & punches)	1	3:27
Lightweight	Nate Jennerman	def.	Jake Childers	Submission (rear-naked choke)	2	2:00

== Standings After Event ==
The PFL points system is based on results of the match. The winner of a fight receives 3 points. If the fight ends in a draw, both fighters will receive 1 point. The bonus for winning a fight in the first, second, or third round is 3 points, 2 points, and 1 point respectively. The bonus for winning in the third round requires a fight be stopped before 4:59 of the third round. No bonus point will be awarded if a fighter wins via decision. For example, if a fighter wins a fight in the first round, then the fighter will receive 6 total points. A decision win will result in three total points. If a fighter misses weight, the opponent (should they comply with weight limits) will receive 3 points due to a walkover victory, regardless of winning or losing the bout; if the non-offending fighter subsequently wins with a stoppage, all bonus points will be awarded.

=== Light Heavyweight ===
Fighter	Wins	Draws	Losses	1st	2nd	3rd	Total Points (Note: The four fighters with most points advance to the playoffs)
(Australia) Rob Wilkinson	2	0	0	1	1	0	11
(Russia) Omari Akhmedov	2	0	0	1	1	0	11
(Brazil) Antônio Carlos Júnior	2	0	0	1	0	0	9
(Brazil) Delan Monte	1	0	1	1	0	0	6
(United States) Josh Silveira	1	0	0	1	0	0	6
(United States) Cory Hendricks	1	0	0	0	1	0	5
(Norway) Marthin Hamlet	1	0	1	0	0	0	3
(Brazil) Bruce Souto	0	0	2	0	0	0	0
(Lithuania) Teodoras Aukštuolis	0	0	2	0	0	0	0
(Argentina) Emiliano Sordi	0	0	2	0	0	0	0
(Czech Republic) Viktor Pešta	0	0	2	0	0	0	0

=== Lightweight ===
Fighter	Wins	Draws	Losses	1st	2nd	3rd	Total Points (Note: The four fighters with most points advance to the playoffs)
(United States) Anthony Pettis	1	0	0	1	0	0	6
(Canada) Olivier Aubin-Mercier	2	0	0	0	0	0	6
(Paraguay) Alex Martinez	2	0	0	0	0	0	6
(Brazil) Raush Manfio	1	0	1	0	0	1	4
(Brazil) Natan Schulte	1	0	1	0	0	0	3
(United States) Clay Collard	1	0	1	0	0	0	3
(United States) Jeremy Stephens	1	0	1	0	0	0	3
(Scotland) Stevie Ray	0	0	1	0	0	0	0
(South Africa) Don Madge	0	0	1	0	0	0	0
(Poland) Marcin Held	0	0	1	0	0	0	0
(Republic of Ireland) Myles Price	0	0	2	0	0	0	0

== Reported payout ==
The following is the reported payout to the fighters as reported to the Georgia Athletic Commission. The amounts do not include sponsor money, discretionary bonuses, viewership points or additional earnings.

- Alex Martinez: $38,000 ($19,000 show + $19,000 win) def. Clay Collard: $28,000
- Antonio Carlos Junior: $98,000 ($49,000 show + $49,000 win) def. Bruce Souto: $10,000
- Olivier Aubin-Mercier: $54,000 ($27,000 show + $27,000 win) def. Raush Manfio: $27,000
- Jeremy Stephens: $200,000 ($100,000 show + $100,000 win) def. Myles Price: $12,000
- Omari Akhmedov: $206,000 ($103,000 show + $103,000 win) def. Teodoras Aukstuolis: $15,000
- Nathan Schulte: $150,000 ($75,000 show + $75,000 win) def. Marcin Held: $26,000
- Delan Kimura: $20,000 ($10,000 show + $10,000 win) def. Emiliano Sordi: $53,000
- Rob Wilkinson: $32,000 ($16,000 show + $16,000 win) def. Viktor Pesta: $18,000
- Josh Silveira: $50,000 ($25,000 show + $25,000 win) def. Marthin Hamlet: $16,000
- Nate Jennerman: $16,000 ($8,000 show + $8,000 win) def. Jacob Childers: $8,000

== See also ==
- List of PFL events
- List of current PFL fighters
