= Bobby Moffett =

American mixed martial arts fighter

- Born: June 1, 1990 (age 36); Harvey, Illinois, U.S.
- Other names: The Wolfman
- Height: 5 ft 10 in (1.78 m)
- Weight: 145 lb (66 kg; 10 st 5 lb)
- Division: Lightweight; Featherweight
- Reach: 74 in (188 cm)
- Fighting out of: Homewood, Illinois, U.S.
- Team: The MMA Lab (2016–2019); Fight Ready (2019–present)
- Trainer: Eddie Cha
- Rank: Black belt in Brazilian Jiu-Jitsu under Leo Valdes
- Years active: 2013–present

Mixed martial arts record
- Total: 24
- Wins: 17
- By knockout: 1
- By submission: 10
- By decision: 6
- Losses: 6
- By knockout: 1
- By decision: 5
- No contests: 1

Other information
- Mixed martial arts record from Sherdog

Bobby Moffett (born June 1, 1990) is an American mixed martial artist (MMA) who competes in the Featherweight division. A professional since 2013, he has also competed for the UFC, PFL, RFA, and LFA.

== Background ==
Moffett started training in karate when he was young and competed in wrestling since third grade and throughout high school. Moffett learned jiu-jitsu not long after to fulfill his dream to be a fighter after watching The Ultimate Fighter.

== Mixed martial arts career ==
=== Early career ===
After compiling an amateur record of 6–0, Moffett started his professional MMA career in 2013. He fought under various promoters in the southern region of United States, notably Resurrection Fighting Alliance (RFA) and Legacy Fighting Alliance (LFA). He amassed a record of 12–3 prior participated in Dana White's Tuesday Night Contender Series.

=== Dana White's Tuesday Night Contender Series ===
Moffett appeared in Dana White's Contender Series 16 web-series program, facing Jacob Kilburn on July 10, 2018. He won the fight via unanimous decision and earned a UFC contract.

=== Ultimate Fighting Championship ===
Soon after he was signed in UFC, Moffett made his debut on November 10, 2018, at UFC Fight Night: Korean Zombie vs. Rodríguez, against Chas Skelly. He won the fight via a controversial technical submission. Subsequently, Skelly appealed to the Colorado Office of Combative Sports on grounds of referee error regarding the stoppage. Eventually on June 24, 2020, Skelly announced on his social media account that the results was overturned to no contest.

His next fight came on March 23, 2019, at UFC Fight Night: Thompson vs. Pettis against Bryce Mitchell. He lost the fight via unanimous decision. This fight earned both the Fight of the Night award.

Moffett faced Enrique Barzola on August 10, 2019, at UFC Fight Night: Shevchenko vs. Carmouche 2. He lost the fight via split decision. With this loss, he was subsequently released by the UFC.

=== Professional Fighters League ===
Moffett, as a replacement for Anthony Dizy, faced Bubba Jenkins at PFL 4 on June 10, 2021. He lost the bout via unanimous decision.

Moffett faced Jason Knight on August 27, 2021, at PFL 9. At weigh-ins, Moffett weighed in at 148.2 pounds, missing weight by 2.2 pounds. The bout proceeded at catchweight and Moffett was fined a percentage of his purse, which went to Jason Knight. He won the bout via unanimous decision.

=== Return to regional circuit ===
Moffett faced Charles Cheeks III at Fury FC 57 on February 11, 2022. He won the bout via unanimous decision.

Moffett faced Austin Wourms on November 4, 2022, at Freedom Fight Night 3, winning the bout via brabo choke in the first round.

Moffett then faced Daniel Soto in the main event of Ringside Union Fighting 4 on April 22, 2024. He won the fight via rear-naked choke in just 22 seconds.

== Personal life ==
Bobby and his wife Yulissa have a daughter.

== Championships and accomplishments ==
- Ultimate Fighting Championship
  - Fight of the Night (one time) vs. Bryce Mitchell
- Warrior Xtreme Cagefighting
  - WXC Featherweight Championship (one time; former)

== Mixed martial arts record ==
Professional record breakdown
24 matches	17 wins	6 losses
By knockout	1	1
By submission	10	0
By decision	6	5
No contests	1	

Res.	Record	Opponent	Method	Event	Date	Round	Time	Location	Notes
Win	17–6 (1)	Daniel Soto	Submission (rear-naked choke)	RUF MMA 54	April 22, 2023	1	0:22	Phoenix, Arizona, United States	Lightweight debut.
Win	16–6 (1)	Austin Wourms	Submission (brabo choke)	Freedom Fight Night 3	November 4, 2022	1	3:12	Phoenix, Arizona, United States	Catchweight (150 lb) bout.
Win	15–6 (1)	Charles Cheeks III	Decision (unanimous)	Fury FC 57	February 11, 2022	3	5:00	Humble, Texas, United States	
Win	14–6 (1)	Jason Knight	Decision (unanimous)	PFL 9 (2021)	August 27, 2021	3	5:00	Hollywood, Florida, United States	Catchweight (148.2 lb) bout; Moffett missed weight.
Loss	13–6 (1)	Bubba Jenkins	Decision (unanimous)	PFL 4 (2021)	June 10, 2021	3	5:00	Atlantic City, New Jersey, United States	
Loss	13–5 (1)	Enrique Barzola	Decision (split)	UFC Fight Night: Shevchenko vs. Carmouche 2	August 10, 2019	3	5:00	Montevideo, Uruguay	
Loss	13–4 (1)	Bryce Mitchell	Decision (unanimous)	UFC Fight Night: Thompson vs. Pettis	March 23, 2019	3	5:00	Nashville, Tennessee, United States	Fight of the Night.
NC	13–3 (1)	Chas Skelly	NC (overturned)	UFC Fight Night: The Korean Zombie vs. Rodríguez	November 10, 2018	2	2:43	Denver, Colorado, United States	Originally a submission (brabo choke) win for Moffett; overturned after Skelly appealed the loss due to a controversial referee call.
Win	13–3	Jacob Kilburn	Submission (Brabo choke)	Dana White's Contender Series 16	August 7, 2018	2	1:02	Las Vegas, Nevada, United States	
Win	12–3	Johnathon Jackson	Submission (Brabo choke)	V3 Fights 69	June 16, 2018	2	1:02	Memphis, Tennessee, United States	
Win	11–3	Enrique Gonzalez	Decision (unanimous)	V3 Fights 60	April 14, 2018	3	5:00	Hammond, Indiana, United States	
Loss	10–3	Thanh Le	TKO (punches)	LFA 31	January 19, 2018	2	0:55	Phoenix, Arizona, United States	For the interim LFA Featherweight Championship.
Win	10–2	Nate Jennerman	Decision (unanimous)	LFA 20	December 3, 2017	3	5:00	Prior Lake, Minnesota, United States	
Win	9–2	T.J. Brown	Decision (split)	RFA 46	December 3, 2016	3	5:00	Branson, Missouri, United States	
Loss	8–2	Raoni Barcelos	Decision (unanimous)	RFA 39	June 17, 2016	5	5:00	Hammond, Indiana, United States	For the RFA Featherweight Championship.
Win	8–1	Caleb Williams	Submission (arm-triangle choke)	Hoosier Fight Club 27	February 6, 2016	2	4:46	Michigan City, Indiana, United States	
Win	7–1	Dan Moret	Decision (unanimous)	RFA 24	March 6, 2015	3	5:00	Prior Lake, Minnesota, United States	
Win	6–1	David Harris	Submission (arm-triangle choke)	Warrior Xtreme Cagefighting 55	February 7, 2015	2	1:19	Southgate, Michigan, United States	Won the vacant WXC Featherweight Championship.
Win	5–1	Scott Marckini	TKO (corner stoppage)	Hoosier Fight Club 22	November 8, 2014	1	5:00	Valparaiso, Indiana, United States	
Loss	4–1	Kenny Jordan	Decision (unanimous)	Hoosier Fight Club 21	September 13, 2014	3	5:00	Villa Park, Illinois, United States	
Win	4–0	Pedro Velasco	Submission (rear-naked choke)	American Predator FC 16	April 5, 2014	1	1:44	Villa Park, Illinois, United States	
Win	3–0	Terry House Jr.	Submission (brabo choke)	Hoosier Fight Club 19	February 8, 2014	1	3:25	Valparaiso, Indiana, United States	
Win	2–0	Drew Morais	Submission (choke)	American Predator FC 14	October 5, 2013	1	1:04	McCook, Illinois, United States	Catchweight (150 lb) bout.
Win	1–0	Julian Collins	Submission (brabo choke)	American Predator FC 11	July 22, 2013	1	1:21	McCook, Illinois, United States	Featherweight debut.

== See also ==
- List of current PFL fighters
- List of male mixed martial artists
