= PFL 6 (2023) =

Mixed martial arts event in Georgia, US

- The poster for PFL 6
- Promotion: Professional Fighters League
- Date: June 23, 2023
- Venue: Overtime Elite Arena
- City: Atlanta, Georgia, United States

Event chronology
PFL 5	PFL 6	PFL Europe 2

PFL 6 was a mixed martial arts event produced by the Professional Fighters League that took place on June 23, 2023, at the Overtime Elite Arena in, Atlanta, Georgia, United States. This marked the sixth regular-season event of the tournament and included fights in the Lightweight and Welterweight divisions.

== Background ==
This event was headlined by returning 2022 Lightweight Champion Olivier Aubin-Mercier facing debutant Anthony Romero and 2022 Welterweight Champion Sadibou Sy facing off against Shane Mitchell.

A welterweight bout between Cedric Doumbé and Jarrah Al-Silawi was scheduled for this event. However, Cedric had to pull out of the bout due to a wrist injury and was replaced by Zach Juusola. Juusola was later replaced by Solomon Renfro.

At weigh-ins, Dilano Taylor weighed in at 171.2 pounds, 0.2 pounds over the Welterweight limit. He was fined 20 percent of his purse which went to his opponent Carlos Leal and he was given a one-point penalty in the standings. Brahyan Zurcher also missed weight for his featherweight bout against Mike Bardsley, weighing in at 146.8 pounds and forfeited 20 percent of his purse to Bardsley.

== Results ==
Main card (ESPN / ESPN+)
Weight class				Method	Round	Time	Notes
Lightweight	Olivier Aubin-Mercier	def.	Anthony Romero	KO (knee)	3	0:28
Welterweight	Sadibou Sy	def.	Shane Mitchell	KO (spinning wheel kick)	3	1:35
Lightweight	Shane Burgos	def.	Yamato Nishikawa	Decision (unanimous) (30–26, 30–26, 30–26)	3	5:00
Welterweight	Magomed Magomedkerimov	def.	David Zawada	TKO (punches)	1	3:54
Welterweight	Magomed Umalatov	def.	Nayib López	Decision (unanimous) (30–27, 30–27, 29–27)	3	5:00
Lightweight	Clay Collard	def.	Stevie Ray	TKO (punches)	2	1:04
Preliminary card (ESPN+)
Welterweight	Carlos Leal	def.	Dilano Taylor	KO (punches)	2	1:13	(Note: Taylor missed weight (171.2 lbs))
Lightweight	Natan Schulte	def.	Raush Manfio	Decision (unanimous) (30–27, 30–27, 29–28)	3	5:00
Lightweight	Bruno Miranda	def.	Alex Martinez	Decision (split) (28–29, 29–28, 29–28)	3	5:00
Welterweight	Solomon Renfro	def.	Jarrah Al-Silawi	KO (punches)	2	1:44
Featherweight	Brahyan Zurcher	def.	Mike Bardsley	TKO (punch)	2	4:45	(Note: Zurcher missed weight (146.8 lbs))
Featherweight	Abdullah Al-Qahtani	def.	Lamar Brown	Submission (rear-naked choke)	1	1:35

== Standings after event ==
The PFL points system is based on the results of the match. The winner of a fight receives 3 points. If the fight ends in a draw, both fighters will receive 1 point. The bonus for winning a fight in the first, second, or third round is 3 points, 2 points, and 1 point respectively. The bonus for winning in the third round requires a fight to be stopped before 4:59 of the third round. No bonus point will be awarded if a fighter wins via decision. For example, if a fighter wins a fight in the first round, then the fighter will receive 6 total points. A decision win will result in three total points. If a fighter misses weight, the opponent (should they comply with weight limits) will receive 3 points due to a walkover victory, regardless of winning or losing the bout; if the non-offending fighter subsequently wins with a stoppage, all bonus points will be awarded.

=== Welterweight ===
Fighter	Wins	Draws	Losses	1st	2nd	3rd	Total Points (Note: The four fighters with most points advance to the playoffs)
♛ (Russia) Magomed Magomedkerimov	2	0	0	2	0	0	12
♛ (Brazil) Carlos Leal	2	0	0	1	1	0	11
♛ (Sweden) Sadibou Sy	2	0	0	0	1	1	9
♛ (Russia) Magomed Umalatov	2	0	0	1	0	0	9
E (United States) Solomon Renfro	1	0	0	0	1	0	5
E (Mexico) Nayib López	1	0	1	0	0	0	3
E (Australia) Shane Mitchell	0	0	2	0	0	0	0
E (Germany) David Zawada	0	0	2	0	0	0	0
E (Jordan) Jarrah Al-Silawi	0	0	2	0	0	0	0
E (Jamaica) Dilano Taylor	0	0	2	0	0	0	-1

=== Lightweight ===
Fighter	Wins	Draws	Losses	1st	2nd	3rd	Total Points (Note: The four fighters with most points advance to the playoffs)
♛ (United States) Clay Collard	2	0	0	0	1	0	8
♛ (Canada) Olivier Aubin-Mercier	2	0	0	0	0	1	7
♛ (Brazil) Bruno Miranda	2	0	0	0	0	0	6
♛ (United States) Shane Burgos	1	0	1	0	0	0	3
E (Brazil) Natan Schulte	2	0	0	0	0	0	3
E (Brazil) Raush Manfio	1	0	1	0	0	0	3
E (Japan) Yamato Nishikawa	0	0	2	0	0	0	0
E (Paraguay) Alexander Martinez	0	0	2	0	0	0	0
E (Scotland) Stevie Ray	0	0	2	0	0	0	0
E (Canada) Anthony Romero	0	0	1	0	0	0	0

== Reported payout ==
The following is the reported payout to the fighters as reported to the Georgia Athletic Commission. The amounts do not include sponsor money, discretionary bonuses, viewership points, or additional earnings.

- Olivier Aubin-Mercier: $100,000 (includes $50,000 win bonus) def. Anthony Romero: $15,000
- Sadibou Sy: $100,000 (includes $50,000 win bonus) def. Shane Mitchell: $10,000
- Shane Burgos: $100,000 (no win bonus) def. Yamato Nishikawa: $18,000
- Magomed Magomedkerimov: $100,000 (includes $50,000 win bonus) def. David Zawada: $20,000
- Magomed Umalatov: $86,000 (includes $43,000 win bonus) def. Nayib Lopez: $16,000
- Clay Collard: $62,000 (includes $31,000 win bonus) def. Stevie Ray: $50,000
- Carlos Leal: $32,000 (includes $16,000 win bonus) def. Dilano Taylor: $20,000
- Natan Schulte: $100,000 (includes $50,000 win bonus) def. Raush Manfio: $30,000
- Bruno Miranda: $26,000 (includes $13,000 win bonus) def. Alex Martinez: $22,000
- Solomon Renfro: $20,000 (includes $10,000 win bonus) def. Jarrah Al-Silawi: $50,000
- Brahyan Zurcher: $19,000 (includes $9,500 win bonus) def. Mike Bardsley: $3,000
- Abdullah Al-Qahtani: $40,000 (includes $20,000 win bonus) def. Lamar Brown: $3,000

== See also ==
- List of PFL events
- List of current PFL fighters
