= Natan Schulte =

Brazilian mixed martial arts fighter

- Born: Natan Silveira Schulte; February 20, 1992 (age 34); Joinville, Brazil
- Other names: Russo
- Height: 5 ft 10 in (1.78 m)
- Weight: 155 lb (70 kg; 11 st 1 lb)
- Division: Lightweight
- Reach: 69 in (175 cm)
- Fighting out of: Joinville, Santa Catarina, Brazil
- Team: American Top Team
- Years active: 2011–present

Mixed martial arts record
- Total: 33
- Wins: 26
- By knockout: 4
- By submission: 10
- By decision: 12
- Losses: 6
- By knockout: 1
- By submission: 1
- By decision: 4
- Draws: 1

Other information
- Mixed martial arts record from Sherdog

Natan Silveira Schulte (born February 20, 1992) is a Brazilian mixed martial artist who competes in the Lightweight division. He has previously competed in the Professional Fighters League, where he won the 2019 and 2018 PFL Lightweight Seasons. As of August 21, 2026, he is #9 in the PFL lightweight rankings.

== Background ==
Natan Schulte was born in Joinville, where he has family, and started training at the age of 14 in the city after constant bullying. His first professional fight was in 2011, but before that he had already fought more than 40 amateur fights, between muay thai, kickboxing and jiu-jitsu.

He was two-time champion of Santa Catarina and, at age 17, Brazilian champion. He even represented Brazil at the World Cup, in Serbia, but did not win the title.

== Mixed martial arts career ==
=== Early career ===
Schulte began his professional MMA career in Brazil, where after winning his debut and losing his next two bouts, he rebounded to win his next 5 bouts and joined XFC International, an international promotion with a popular TV deal in Brazil and frequent live events. Shortly after joining XFCi, Schulte won the season one lightweight tournament. After winning a bout back on the Brazilian regionals, he faced Islam Mamedov at WSOF 35, on May 21, 2016, where he lost the bout at the end of the second round by the way of armbar submission.

=== Professional Fighters League ===
==== 2018 Season ====
After WSOF became PFL, Natan made his return his promotional debut against Chris Wade at PFL 2 on June 21, 2018, winning the bout via unanimous decision.

In his second fight in the tournament, Schulte was scheduled to face Brian Foster on August 2, 2018 at PFL 5, however Foster was forced to pull out and replaced by Jason High. He lost the fight via technical submission due to a rear-naked choke in the first round.

In the playoffs, Schulte was pitted against Johnny Case at PFL 9 on October 13, 2018. The bout ended in a majority draw, but Schulte advanced to the semi-finals and Case was eliminated from the tournament.

In the semifinals, Schulte faced Chris Wade again, winning the bout in a split decision and advancing to the tournament finals.

In the finals of the $1 million collective tournament, Schulte faced Rashid Magomedov at PFL 11 on December 31, 2018, winning the back-and-forth bout by a unanimous decision.

==== 2019 Season ====
Making his first appearance of the 2019 season on May 23, 2019 at PFL 2, Schulte submitted Yincang Bao by the way of rear-naked choke in the first round.

Schulte was expected to face Ramsey Nijem on July 25, 2019 at PFL 5, but Nijem could not make weight and was disqualified and removed from the card. Jesse Ronson replaced him and Schulte won the bout via unanimous decision.

In the quarter-finals of the tournament on October 17, 2019 at PFL 8, Schulte faced Ramsey Nijem, chocking him out in the first round with a rear-naked choke.

Advancing to the semi-finals, Schulte faced Akhmed Aliev in the same night, once again choking out his opponent, this time in the second round via arm-triangle choke.

In the finals on December 31, 2019 at PFL 10, Schulte faced Loik Radzhabov, winning the close bout and the tournament via unanimous decision.

==== 2021 Season ====
After a year off due to the cancellation of the 2020 season due to COVID, Schulte made his return against Marcin Held on April 23, 2021 at PFL 1. He lost the bout via unanimous decision.

Schulte was originally set to face Mikhail Odintsov on June 20, 2021 at PFL 4, however Odintsov pulled out of the bout due to injury and was replaced by Raush Manfio, in turn after bout cancellations on the card, Schulte was instead booked against undefeated Alexander Martinez. Schulte won the close bout via split decision.

==== 2022 Season ====
To start off the 2022 LW season, Schulte faced eventual 2022 Champion Olivier Aubin-Mercier on April 23, 2022 at PFL 1. He lost the close bout via split decision.

In the second regular season bout, Schulte faced Marcin Held on June 17, 2022 at PFL 4. He won the bout via unanimous decision, but didn't have enough points to advance to the playoffs.

Schulte faced Jeremy Stephens on November 25, 2022 at PFL 10. Schulte won the bout in the second round, submitting Stephens by arm-triangle choke.

==== 2023 season ====
Schulte faced Stevie Ray on April 14, 2023 at PFL 3. He won the fight via unanimous decision.

Schulte faced Raush Manfio on June 23, 2023 at PFL 6. Schulte won via a unanimous decision in a fight that saw both men, who openly state to be best friends, refuse to engage. Following the fight, PFL suspended both fighters, saying in a statement that "All fighters in their PFL Fight Agreements agree to use their best efforts ... skills and abilities as a professional athlete to compete ... and defeat any opponent. It was very clear that Natan and Raush did not meet that contractual standard in yesterday’s bout."

==== 2026 ====
After almost 3-years hiatus, Schulte faced Jakub Kaszuba on March 28, 2026, at PFL Pittsburgh. He lost the fight via unanimous decision.

Schulte faced Makkasharip Zaynukov on August 22, 2026, at PFL Tampa. He won the bout via unanimous decision.

== Championships and accomplishments ==
- Professional Fighters League
  - 2019 PFL Lightweight Championship
  - 2018 PFL Lightweight Championship
- Xtreme Fighting Championships
  - Xtreme Fighting Championships Season 1 Lightweight Tournament

== Mixed martial arts record ==
Professional record breakdown
33 matches	26 wins	6 losses
By knockout	4	1
By submission	10	1
By decision	12	4
Draws	1	

Res.	Record	Opponent	Method	Event	Date	Round	Time	Location	Notes
Win	26–6–1	Makkasharip Zaynukov	Decision (unanimous)	PFL Tampa: Cyborg vs. Vieira	August 22, 2026	3	5:00	Tampa, Florida, United States	
Loss	25–6–1	Jakub Kaszuba	Decision (unanimous)	PFL Pittsburgh: Eblen vs. Battle	March 28, 2026	3	5:00	Moon Township, Pennsylvania, United States	
Win	25–5–1	Raush Manfio	Decision (unanimous)	PFL 6 (2023)	June 23, 2023	3	5:00	Atlanta, Georgia, United States	
Win	24–5–1	Stevie Ray	Decision (unanimous)	PFL 3 (2023)	April 14, 2023	3	5:00	Las Vegas, Nevada, United States	
Win	23–5–1	Jeremy Stephens	Submission (arm-triangle choke)	PFL 10 (2022)	November 25, 2022	2	1:32	New York City, New York, United States	
Win	22–5–1	Marcin Held	Decision (unanimous)	PFL 4 (2022)	June 17, 2022	3	5:00	Atlanta, Georgia, United States	
Loss	21–5–1	Olivier Aubin-Mercier	Decision (split)	PFL 1 (2022)	April 20, 2022	3	5:00	Arlington, Texas, United States	
Win	21–4–1	Alex Martinez	Decision (split)	PFL 4 (2021)	June 10, 2021	3	5:00	Atlantic City, New Jersey, United States	
Loss	20–4–1	Marcin Held	Decision (unanimous)	PFL 1 (2021)	April 23, 2021	3	5:00	Atlantic City, New Jersey, United States	
Win	20–3–1	Loik Radzhabov	Decision (unanimous)	PFL 10 (2019)	December 31, 2019	5	5:00	New York City, New York, United States	Won the 2019 PFL Lightweight Tournament.
Win	19–3–1	Akhmed Aliev	Technical Submission (arm-triangle choke)	PFL 8 (2019)	October 17, 2019	2	2:26	Las Vegas, Nevada, United States	2019 PFL Lightweight Tournament Semifinal.
Win	18–3–1	Ramsey Nijem	Technical Submission (rear-naked choke)	PFL 8 (2019)	October 17, 2019	1	0:52	Las Vegas, Nevada, United States	2019 PFL Lightweight Tournament Quarterfinal.
Win	17–3–1	Jesse Ronson	Decision (unanimous)	PFL 5 (2019)	July 25, 2019	3	5:00	Atlantic City, New Jersey, United States	
Win	16–3–1	Yincang Bao	Submission (rear-naked choke)	PFL 2 (2019)	May 23, 2019	1	3:03	Uniondale, New York, United States	
Win	15–3–1	Rashid Magomedov	Decision (unanimous)	PFL 11 (2018)	December 31, 2018	5	5:00	New York City, New York, United States	Won the 2018 PFL Lightweight Tournament.
Win	14–3–1	Chris Wade	Decision (split)	PFL 9 (2018)	October 13, 2018	3	5:00	Long Beach, California, United States	2018 PFL Lightweight Tournament Semifinal.
Draw	13–3–1	Johnny Case	Draw (majority)	PFL 9 (2018)	October 13, 2018	2	5:00	Long Beach, California, United States	2018 PFL Lightweight Tournament Quarterfinal.
Win	13–3	Jason High	Technical Submission (rear-naked choke)	PFL 5 (2018)	August 2, 2018	1	4:18	Uniondale, New York, United States	
Win	12–3	Chris Wade	Decision (unanimous)	PFL 2 (2018)	June 21, 2018	3	5:00	Chicago, Illinois, United States	
Loss	11–3	Islam Mamedov	Submission (armbar)	WSOF 35	March 18, 2017	2	4:56	Verona, New York, United States	
Win	11–2	Henerson Duarte	Decision (unanimous)	Max Fight 18	May 21, 2016	3	5:00	Varginha, Brazil	
Win	10–2	Igor Egorov	Submission (rear-naked choke)	XFC International 9	March 14, 2015	1	3:58	São Paulo, Brazil	
Win	9–2	Gláucio Eliziário	Decision (unanimous)	XFC International 5	June 7, 2014	3	5:00	São Paulo, Brazil	Won the XFCI Lightweight Tournament.
Win	8–2	Gilson Lomanto	TKO (punches)	XFC International 4	April 26, 2014	1	4:28	São Paulo, Brazil	XFCI Lightweight Tournament Semifinals.
Win	7–2	Giovanny Arroyo	TKO (punches)	XFC International 1	February 8, 2014	3	2:26	Osasco, Brazil	XFCI Lightweight Tournament Quarterfinals.
Win	6–2	Rodrigo Basile	Submission (guillotine choke)	Nitrix Champion Fight 17	November 3, 2013	1	0:33	Balneário Camboriú, Brazil	Catchweight (158 lb) bout.
Win	5–2	Daniel Hoffmann	Submission (guillotine choke)	Nitrix Champion Fight 15	August 10, 2013	1	1:15	Joinville, Brazil	
Win	4–2	Sergio Barbosa	Submission (guillotine choke)	Paranaguá Extreme Combate 1	July 6, 2013	2	0:51	Paranaguá, Brazil	
Win	3–2	Marcos Schmitz	TKO (punches)	Blufight MMA 4	April 7, 2013	3	3:55	Blumenau, Brazil	
Win	2–2	Josimar Cardoso	Submission (guillotine choke)	Bad Boy Fight Challenge 1	July 15, 2012	2	2:28	São José, Brazil	
Loss	1–2	Pedro Gostinski Junior	TKO (doctor stoppage)	Nitrix Champion Fight 11	May 5, 2012	2	5:00	Joinville, Brazil	
Loss	1–1	Yuri Maia	Decision (unanimous)	X-Fest 5	April 14, 2012	3	5:00	Porto Alegre, Brazil	
Win	1–0	Piero Severo	TKO (front kick and punches)	Monster Black Combat 1	December 12, 2011	2	1:58	Rio Grande, Brazil	Lightweight debut.

== See also ==
- List of male mixed martial artists
