= PFL =

PFL may refer to:

== Sport ==
- Professional Fighters League, an American mixed martial arts league
- Peel Football League, an Australian rules football league
- Pioneer Football League, an NCAA Division I FCS football conference
- Professional Futsal League, an American sports league
- Philippines Football League, an association football league in the Philippines
- Polish Football League, an American football league in Poland

=== Professional Football League ===
- First Professional Football League (Bulgaria)
- Professional Football League of Ukraine
- Russian Professional Football League
- TT Pro League, formerly the Professional Football League of Trinidad and Tobago
- Uzbekistan Super League

== Science ==
- Pyruvate formate lyase, an enzyme important in the regulation of anaerobic glucose metabolism
- Positive feedback loop

== Language ==
- PFL, ISO 639-3 language code for the Palatine German language
- People-first language

== Organisations ==
- Perth Freight Link, transport route for trucks to access Fremantle port starting at Muchea in Western Australia.
- Pacific Forum Line, a shipping alliance located in Nauru
- Partido da Frente Liberal (Liberal Front Party), a Brazilian political party
- Popular Front of Latvia, a former Latvian political party
- Priests for Life, an American-based Roman Catholic anti-abortion organization

== Other ==
- Paid Family Leave (California), a California law that extends unemployment disability compensation
- Pre-fader listen, a sound mixer function used for making a Fade (audio engineering)
- Purfleet railway station, Thurrock, Essex, England (National Rail station code PFL)
