= PFL 5 (2022) =

Professional Fighters League MMA event in 2022

- The poster for PFL 5
- Promotion: Professional Fighters League
- Date: June 24, 2022
- Venue: Overtime Elite Arena
- City: Atlanta, Georgia

Event chronology
| PFL 4 | PFL 5 | PFL 6 |

The PFL 5 mixed martial arts event for the 2022 season of the Professional Fighters League was held on June 24, 2022 at the Overtime Elite Arena in Atlanta, Georgia. This marked the fifth regular season event of the tournament and included fights in the Heavyweight and Featherweight divisions.

== Background ==
In the main event, 2021 heavyweight champion Bruno Cappelozza faced Matheus Scheffel, with Cappelozza having his second headlining bout of the season following his first-round TKO victory 2022 PFL 2. The co-main event featured a lightweight bout between former UFC lightweight champion Anthony Pettis and fellow UFC veteran Stevie Ray. The rest of the main card saw former UFC vets Chris Wade and Kyle Bochniak facing off in a featherweight bout while heavyweights Renan Ferreira and Klidson Abreu met in a second round bout.

Stuart Austin, Ali Isaev, Jamelle Jones, Saba Bolaghi, Boston Salmon all pulled out of their respective bouts, with the matchups being reorganized and Shelton Graves, Maurice Greene, Juan Adams, Reinaldo Ekson, Ago Huskić stepping in to replace them.

== Results ==
Main Card (ESPN/ESPN+)
| Weight class | | | | Method | Round | Time | Notes |
|---|---|---|---|---|---|---|---|
| Heavyweight | Matheus Scheffel | def. | Bruno Cappelozza | Decision (unanimous) (29–28, 29–28, 29–28) | 3 | 5:00 |
| Lightweight | Stevie Ray | def. | Anthony Pettis | Submission (body triangle) | 2 | 3:57 |
| Heavyweight | Klidson Abreu | vs. | Renan Ferreira | NC (overturned) | 3 | 5:00 | (Note: Originally a Decision (unanimous) (30–27, 30–27, 30–27) win for Abreu; overturned after he tested positive for a banned substance.) |
| Featherweight | Chris Wade | def. | Kyle Bochniak | TKO (head kick & punches) | 1 | 1:10 |
| Heavyweight | Ante Delija | def. | Shelton Graves | Decision (unanimous) (29–27, 29–27, 29–27) | 3 | 5:00 | (Note: Graves deducted one point in round 2 for a headbutt.) |
| Featherweight | Bubba Jenkins | def. | Reinaldo Ekson | Decision (unanimous) (30–27, 30–27, 30–27) | 3 | 5:00 |
| Heavyweight | Denis Goltsov | def. | Maurice Greene | Decision (unanimous) (30–27, 30–27, 30–27) | 3 | 5:00 |
Preliminary card (ESPN+)
| Featherweight | Lance Palmer | def. | Sheymon Moraes | Decision (unanimous) (29–28, 29–28, 30–27) | 3 | 5:00 |
| Heavyweight | Juan Adams | def. | Sam Kei | TKO (punches) | 2 | 2:30 |
| Featherweight | Ryoji Kudo | def. | Alejandro Flores | KO (punch) | 1 | 2:52 |
| Featherweight | Brendan Loughnane | def. | Ago Huskić | Decision (unanimous) (29–28, 29–28, 30–27) | 3 | 5:00 |

== Standings After Event ==
The PFL points system is based on results of the match. The winner of a fight receives 3 points. If the fight ends in a draw, both fighters will receive 1 point. The bonus for winning a fight in the first, second, or third round is 3 points, 2 points, and 1 point respectively. The bonus for winning in the third round requires a fight be stopped before 4:59 of the third round. No bonus point will be awarded if a fighter wins via decision. For example, if a fighter wins a fight in the first round, then the fighter will receive 6 total points. A decision win will result in three total points. If a fighter misses weight, the opponent (should they comply with weight limits) will receive 3 points due to a walkover victory, regardless of winning or losing the bout; if the non-offending fighter subsequently wins with a stoppage, all bonus points will be awarded.

=== Heavyweight ===
| Fighter | Wins | Draws | Losses | 1st | 2nd | 3rd | Total Points (Note: The four fighters with most points advance to the playoffs) |
|---|---|---|---|---|---|---|---|
| (Russia) Denis Goltsov | 2 | 0 | 0 | 1 | 0 | 0 | 9 |
| (Croatia) Ante Delija | 2 | 0 | 0 | 0 | 1 | 0 | 8 |
| (Brazil) Renan Ferreira | 1 | 0 | 1 | 1 | 0 | 0 | 6 |
| (Brazil) Bruno Cappelozza | 1 | 0 | 1 | 1 | 0 | 0 | 6 |
| (Brazil) Klidson Abreu | 2 | 0 | 0 | 0 | 0 | 0 | 6 |
| (United States) Juan Adams | 1 | 0 | 0 | 0 | 1 | 0 | 5 |
| (Brazil) Matheus Scheffel | 1 | 0 | 1 | 0 | 0 | 0 | 3 |
| (Tonga) Sam Kei | 0 | 0 | 1 | 0 | 0 | 0 | 0 |
| (United States) Shelton Graves | 0 | 0 | 1 | 0 | 0 | 0 | 0 |
| (United States) Maurice Greene | 0 | 0 | 1 | 0 | 0 | 0 | 0 |
| (Israel) Adam Keresh | 0 | 0 | 1 | 0 | 0 | 0 | 0 |
| (United States) Cody Goodale | 0 | 0 | 1 | 0 | 0 | 0 | 0 |
| (United States) Jamelle Jones | 0 | 0 | 1 | 0 | 0 | 0 | 0 |
| (England) Stuart Austin | 0 | 0 | 1 | 0 | 0 | 0 | 0 |

=== Lightweight ===
| Fighter | Wins | Draws | Losses | 1st | 2nd | 3rd | Total Points (Note: The eight fighters with most points advance to the playoffs) |
|---|---|---|---|---|---|---|---|
| (United States) Anthony Pettis | 1 | 0 | 1 | 1 | 0 | 0 | 6 |
| (Canada) Olivier Aubin-Mercier | 2 | 0 | 0 | 0 | 0 | 0 | 6 |
| (Paraguay) Alex Martinez | 2 | 0 | 0 | 0 | 0 | 0 | 6 |
| (Scotland) Stevie Ray | 1 | 0 | 1 | 0 | 1 | 0 | 5 |
| (Brazil) Raush Manfio | 1 | 0 | 1 | 0 | 0 | 1 | 4 |
| (Brazil) Natan Schulte | 1 | 0 | 1 | 0 | 0 | 0 | 3 |
| (United States) Clay Collard | 1 | 0 | 1 | 0 | 0 | 0 | 3 |
| (United States) Jeremy Stephens | 1 | 0 | 1 | 0 | 0 | 0 | 3 |
| (Republic of Ireland) Myles Price | 0 | 0 | 2 | 0 | 0 | 0 | 0 |
| (Poland) Marcin Held | 0 | 0 | 1 | 0 | 0 | 0 | 0 |
| (South Africa) Don Madge | 0 | 0 | 1 | 0 | 0 | 0 | 0 |

=== Featherweight ===
| Fighter | Wins | Draws | Losses | 1st | 2nd | 3rd | Total Points (Note: The four fighters with most points advance to the playoffs) |
|---|---|---|---|---|---|---|---|
| (United States) Chris Wade | 2 | 0 | 0 | 0 | 0 | 0 | 9 |
| (Japan) Ryoji Kudo | 1 | 0 | 1 | 1 | 0 | 0 | 6 |
| (United States) Bubba Jenkins | 2 | 0 | 0 | 0 | 0 | 0 | 6 |
| (England) Brendan Loughnane | 2 | 0 | 0 | 0 | 0 | 0 | 6 |
| (Brazil) Sheymon Moraes | 1 | 0 | 1 | 0 | 0 | 0 | 3 |
| (United States) Lance Palmer | 1 | 0 | 1 | 0 | 0 | 0 | 3 |
| (Mexico) Alejandro Flores | 1 | 0 | 1 | 0 | 0 | 0 | 3 |
| (United States) Kyle Bochniak | 0 | 0 | 2 | 0 | 0 | 0 | 0 |
| (Bosnia and Herzegovina) Ago Huskić | 0 | 0 | 1 | 0 | 0 | 0 | 0 |
| (Brazil) Reinaldo Ekson | 0 | 0 | 1 | 0 | 0 | 0 | 0 |
| (United States) Boston Salmon | 0 | 0 | 1 | 0 | 0 | 0 | 0 |
| (Germany) Saba Bolaghi | 0 | 0 | 1 | 0 | 0 | 0 | 0 |

== Reported payout ==
The following is the reported payout to the fighters as reported to the Georgia Athletic Commission. The amounts do not include sponsor money, discretionary bonuses, viewership points or additional earnings.

- Matheus Scheffel: $20,000 ($10,000 show + $10,000 win) def. Bruno Cappelozza: $40,000
- Stevie Ray: $80,000 ($40,000 show + $40,000 win) def. Anthony Pettis: $750,000
- Klidson Abreu: $42,000 ($21,000 show + $21,000 win) def. Renan Ferreira: $19,000
- Chris Wade: $70,000 ($35,000 show + $35,000 win) def. Kyle Bochniak: $15,000
- Ante Delija: $66,000 ($33,000 show + $33,000 win) def. Shelton Graves: $10,000
- Bubba Jenkins: $98,000 ($49,000 show + $49,000) def. Reinaldo Ekson: $10,000
- Denis Goltsov: $70,000 ($35,000 show + $35,000 win) def. Maurice Greene: $18,000
- Lance Palmer: $170,000 ($85,000 show + $85,000 win) def. Sheymon Moraes: $29,000
- Juan Adams: $16,000 ($8,000 show + $8,000 win) def. Sam Kei: $10,000
- Ryoji Kudo: $26,000 ($13,000 show + $13,000 win) def. Alejandro Flores: $26,000
- Brendan Loughnane: $170,000 ($85,000 show + $85,000 win) def. Ago Huskic: $10,000

== Aftermath ==
On September 23, it was announced that the Georgia Athletic and Entertainment Commission overturned the result of the bout between Klidson Abreu and Renan Ferreira to a no contest, after Abreu failed a drug test for unspecified substances. Klidson and his team contended that the positive was due to prescribed antibiotics for a leg laceration.

== See also ==
- List of PFL events
- List of current PFL fighters
