= 2026 in Absolute Championship Akhmat =

Mixed martial arts events

Information
- First date: January 16, 2026

The year 2026 is the 14th year in the history of the Absolute Championship Akhmat, a mixed martial arts promotion based in Russia.

== List of events ==
#	Event	Date	Venue	Location
1	ACA 198: Omarov vs. Suleymanov 2	Jan 9, 2026	Sport Hall Colosseum	Grozny, Russia
2	ACA 199: Frolov vs. Emeev	Jan 16, 2026	Basket-Hall Krasnodar	Krasnodar, Russia
3	ACA 200: Gasanov vs. Tumenov	Feb 6, 2026	Megasport Sport Palace	Moscow, Russia
4	ACA 201: Silva vs. Podlesniy	Mar 27, 2026	Falcon Club Arena	Minsk, Belarus
5	ACA 202: Johnson vs. Kornilov	Apr 11, 2026	Yubileyny Sports Palace	Saint Petersburg, Russia
6	ACA 203: Gaforov vs. Akopyan	May 8, 2026	Humo Arena	Tashkent, Uzbekistan
7	ACA 204: Shlemenko vs. Dipchikov	Jun 19, 2026	G-Drive Arena	Omsk, Russia
8	ACA 205: Magomedov vs. Gasanov	Jul 17, 2026	Almaty Arena	Almaty, Kazakhstan
9	ACA 206: Vakhaev vs. Aliakbari	Aug 15, 2026	CSKA Arena	Moscow, Russia
10	ACA 207: Goncharov vs. Almeida	Sep 12, 2026	Basket-Hall Krasnodar	Krasnodar, Russia
11	ACA 208: Abdulvakhabov vs. Tibau	Oct 4, 2026	Sport Hall Colosseum	Grozny, Russia
12	ACA 209: Frolov vs. Odilov	Oct 30, 2026	Palace of Tennis and Water Sports Complex	Dushanbe, Tajikistan
13	ACA 210: Myrzabekov vs. Tumenov	Dec 4, 2026	Zhashtyk Arena	Bishkek, Kyrgyzstan
14	ACA 211: Emeev vs. Shlemenko	Dec 25, 2026	KSK Arena	Saint Petersburg, Russia

== ACA 198: Omarov vs. Suleymanov 2 ==
ACA 198: Omarov vs. Suleymanov 2
- Promotion: Absolute Championship Akhmat
- Date: January 9, 2026
- Venue: Sport Hall Colosseum
- City: Grozny, Russia

ACA 198: Omarov vs. Suleymanov 2 was a mixed martial arts event promoted by Absolute Championship Akhmat that took place on January 9, 2026, in Grozny, Russia.

=== Background ===
A ACA Featherweight Championship rematch between current champion Islam Omarov and former champion Alikhan Suleymanov headlined the event. They previously competed at ACA 160 in July 2023, where Omarov won the title via second round TKO.

An interim ACA Lightweight Championship bout between Daud Shaikhaev and Herdeson Batista served as the co-main event.

=== Bonus awards ===
The following fighters received $20,000 bonus. The other finishes received $5,000 additional bonuses.

- Fight of the Night: Khalid Satuev ($50,000) vs. Nikolay Aleksakhin ($20,000)
- Performance of the Night: Islam Omarov and Sulim Batalov

=== Results ===
Main card
Weight class				Method	Round	Time	Notes
Featherweight	Islam Omarov (c)	def.	Alikhan Suleymanov	Submission (guillotine choke)	1	3:14	(Note: For the ACA Featherweight Championship.)
Lightweight	Daud Shaikhaev	def.	Herdeson Batista	Decision (unanimous) (49–46, 49–46, 48–47)	5	5:00	(Note: For the interim ACA Lightweight Championship.)
Light Heavyweight	Sulim Batalov	def.	Asylzhan Bakhytzhanuly	KO (punches)	1	2:04
Bantamweight	Tomáš Deák	def.	Rasul Albaskhanov	Decision (unanimous) (29–28, 29–28, 29–28)	3	5:00
Bantamweight	Kairat Akhmetov	def.	Mansur Khatuev	Decision (split) (29–28, 28–29, 29–28)	3	5:00
Preliminary card
Welterweight	Khalid Satuev	def.	Nikolay Aleksakhin	Decision (majority) (29–29, 30–27, 29–27)	3	5:00
Featherweight	Yusup-Khadzhi Zubariev	def.	Carlos Augusto da Silva	Decision (unanimous) (30–26, 30–26, 30–27)	3	5:00
Light Heavyweight	Arbi Agujev	def.	Manas Imarov	TKO (punches)	1	0:57
Lightweight	Furkat Komilov	def.	Imam Vitakhanov	Decision (unanimous) (29–28, 29–28, 29–28)	3	5:00
Bantamweight	Chermen Gobaev	def.	Murad Kalamov	Decision (unanimous) (29–28, 30–27, 30–27)	3	5:00
Featherweight	Shamil Boraev	def.	Kamal Mamedov	Decision (unanimous) (30–27, 30–27, 30–27)	3	5:00	(Note: Boraev missed weight (149.2 lb).)
Lightweight	Valery Dashkevich	def.	Akhmed Magomedov	Decision (unanimous) (29–28, 30–27, 30–27)	3	5:00
Flyweight	Ramzan Suleymanov	def.	Kholmurod Nurmatov	Submission (arm-triangle choke)	2	0:58

== ACA 199: Frolov vs. Emeev ==
ACA 199: Frolov vs. Emeev
- Promotion: Absolute Championship Akhmat
- Date: January 16, 2026
- Venue: Basket-Hall Krasnodar
- City: Krasnodar, Russia

ACA 199: Frolov vs. Emeev is an upcoming mixed martial arts event promoted by Absolute Championship Akhmat that will take place on January 16, 2026, in Krasnodar, Russia.

=== Background ===
A lightweight bout between Alexey Polpudnikov and Rasul Magomedov was scheduled to headline the event. At the weigh-ins, Polpudnikov weighed in at 73,75 kg, 2,45 kg over the limit. As a results, the bout has been officially cancelled by ACA president Magomed Bibulatov, citing Polpudnikov's serious violation of regulations during the weigh-in.

A middleweight bout between Artem Frolov and UFC veteran Ramazan Emeev was originally scheduled to headline the event, but the bout was shifted to the co-main event instead. After the main event was cancelled, the bout was promoted to new headliner.

=== Bonus awards ===
The following fighters received $20,000 bonus. The other finishes received $5,000 additional bonuses.

- Fight of the Night: No bonus awarded.
- Performance of the Night: Altynbek Mamashov and Magomed Sardalov

=== Results ===
Main card
Weight class				Method	Round	Time	Notes
Middleweight	Ramazan Emeev	def.	Artem Frolov	Decision (unanimous) (30–26, 30–26, 30–26)	3	5:00
Lightweight	Abdul-Rakhman Temirov	def.	Mukhamed Kokov	Decision (unanimous) (30–27, 30–27, 30–27)	3	5:00	(Note: Kokov missed weight (159.3 lb).)
Heavyweight	Zaur Gadzhiev	def.	Vadim Ogar	Decision (unanimous) (30–27, 30–27, 30–27)	3	5:00
Featherweight	Zhora Ayvazyan	def.	Bagdos Olzhabay	Decision (unanimous) (30–27, 30–27, 30–27)	3	5:00
Featherweight	Gleb Khabibullin	def.	Bagama Nikabagamaev	Decision (unanimous) (29–28, 29–28, 30–27)	3	5:00
Preliminary card
Middleweight	Edil Esengulov	def.	Murad Abdulaev	TKO (elbows and punches)	3	4:07
Flyweight	Saygid Abdulaev	def.	Astemir Nagoev	Decision (unanimous) (30–27, 30–27, 29–28)	3	5:00
Middleweight	Altynbek Mamashov	def.	Chris Honeycutt	TKO (knee and punches)	2	0:29
Featherweight	Shamil Basaev	def.	Nikolay Galochkin	Decision (unanimous) (30–27, 30–27, 30–27)	3	5:00
Lightweight	Ali Suleymanov	def.	Tamerlan Temirov	Decision (unanimous) (30–27, 30–27, 30–27)	3	5:00	(Note: Temirov missed weight (159 lb).)
Welterweight	Herbert Batista	def.	Oganes Voskanyan	Decision (split) (29–28, 28–29, 30–27)	3	5:00
Featherweight	Magomed Sardalov	def.	Evgeny Bondarev	TKO (punches)	2	1:47
Featherweight	Radzhab Ramazanov	def.	Gegam Manavazyan	Submission (rear-naked choke)	1	3:41	(Note: Ramazanov missed weight (149 lb).)
Welterweight	Ayndi Umakhanov	def.	Amazasp Martirosyan	TKO (punches)	2	0:52
Featherweight	Alexander Treskin	def.	Luis Rafael Laurentino	Decision (split) (30–27, 28–29, 29–28)	3	5:00
Welterweight	Tagir Magomedov	def.	Joseilton Santos	TKO (punches)	3	3:46

== ACA 200: Gasanov vs. Tumenov ==
ACA 200: Gasanov vs. Tumenov
- Promotion: Absolute Championship Akhmat
- Date: February 6, 2026
- Venue: Megasport Sport Palace
- City: Moscow, Russia

ACA 200: Gasanov vs. Tumenov was a mixed martial arts event promoted by Absolute Championship Akhmat that took place on February 6, 2026, in Moscow, Russia.

=== Background ===
A ACA Middleweight Championship bout between current champion Magomedrasul Gasanov and former two-time ACA Welterweight Champion Albert Tumenov headlined the event.

In addition, a ACA Flyweight Championship bout between current champion Azamat Pshukov and Anatoliy Kondratyev served as the co-main event.

=== Bonus awards ===
The following fighters received $20,000 bonus. The other finishes received $5,000 additional bonuses.

- Fight of the Night: No bonus awarded.
- Performance of the Night: Anatoliy Kondratyev, Bibert Tumenov, Alimardan Abdykaarov and Yusup-Khadzhi Zubariev

=== Results ===
Main card
Weight class				Method	Round	Time	Notes
Middleweight	Magomedrasul Gasanov (c)	def.	Albert Tumenov	Decision (unanimous) (50–45, 50–45, 50–45)	5	5:00	(Note: For the ACA Middleweight Championship.)
Flyweight	Anatoliy Kondratyev	def.	Azamat Pshukov (c)	TKO (punches)	1	2:45	(Note: For the ACA Flyweight Championship.)
Welterweight	Iskandar Mamadaliev	def.	Ali Bagov	Decision (split) (28–29, 29–28, 29–28)	3	5:00	(Note: Mamadaliev missed weight (175.7 lb).)
Lightweight	Bibert Tumenov	def.	Aleksandr Grozin	TKO (punches)	1	2:31
Featherweight	Alimardan Abdykaarov	def.	Saifulla Dzhabrailov	KO (punches)	1	2:02
Preliminary card
Lightweight	Yusup-Khadzhi Zubariev	def.	Artem Reznikov	Decision (unanimous) (29–28, 29–27, 29–27)	3	5:00
Heavyweight	Anton Vyazigin	def.	Carlos Felipe	Decision (unanimous) (30–27, 30–27, 30–27)	3	5:00
Featherweight	Maharbek Karginov	def.	Bekhruz Zugurov	Decision (unanimous) (30–27, 30–27, 30–27)	3	5:00	(Note: Karginov missed weight (149.4 lb).)
Welterweight	Aslanbek Kodzhaev	def.	Vitaly Slipenko	Decision (unanimous) (29–28, 29–28, 29–28)	3	5:00
Light Heavyweight	Ruslan Gabaraev	def.	Grigor Matevosyan	Decision (unanimous) (30–27, 30–27, 30–27)	3	5:00
Light Heavyweight	Ruslan Shamilov	def.	Rene Pessoa	Technical Submission (rear-naked choke)	1	4:59
Welterweight	Rasul Magomedov	def.	Alexey Polpudnikov	Decision (unanimous) (30–27, 29–28, 29–28)	3	5:00
Featherweight	Said Khatiev	def.	Kurban Taygibov	TKO (ankle injury)	2	4:13
Lightweight	Bogdan Plutakhin	def.	Davlatmand Chuponov	TKO (punches)	2	4:17
Heavyweight	Daniil Matsola	def.	Denis Smoldarev	TKO (punches)	1	1:07
Welterweight	Shadid Abdurazakov	def.	Ali Mashrapov	Submission (guillotine choke)	2	2:09

== ACA 201: Silva vs. Podlesniy ==
ACA 201: Silva vs. Podlesniy
- Promotion: Absolute Championship Akhmat
- Date: March 27, 2026
- Venue: Falcon Club Arena
- City: Minsk, Belarus

ACA 201: Silva vs. Podlesniy was a mixed martial arts event promoted by Absolute Championship Akhmat that took place on March 27, 2026, in Minsk, Belarus.

=== Background ===
A ACA Bantamweight Championship bout between current champion Josiel Silva and Alexander Podlesniy headlined the event.

=== Bonus awards ===
The following fighters received $20,000 bonus. The other finishes received $5,000 additional bonuses.

- Fight of the Night: Sergey Starodub ($20,000) vs. Evgeny Erokhin ($10,000)
- Performance of the Night: Erivan Pereira

=== Results ===
Main card
Weight class				Method	Round	Time	Notes
Bantamweight	Josiel Silva (c)	vs.	Alexander Podlesniy	No Contest (accidental eye poke)	2	2:53	(Note: For the ACA Bantamweight Championship. Accidental eye poke rendered Silva unable to continue.)
Heavyweight	Kirill Grishenko	def.	Klidson Abreu	Decision (unanimous) (29–28, 29–28, 29–28)	3	5:00
Lightweight	Sidney Outlaw	def.	Davi Ramos	Decision (unanimous) (30–27, 30–27, 30–27)	3	5:00
Featherweight	Rustam Kerimov	def.	David Dzhibilov	Decision (unanimous) (30–27, 30–27, 30–27)	3	5:00
Lightweight	Felipe Froes	def.	Vladislav Mishkevich	Decision (unanimous) (29–28, 30–27, 30–27)	3	5:00	(Note: Froes missed weight (157.8 lb).)
Preliminary card
Welterweight	Erivan Pereira	def.	Ruslan Kolodko	KO (head kick)	2	3:02
Light Heavyweight	Sergey Starodub	def.	Evgeny Erokhin	Submission (rear-naked choke)	2	3:57
Light Heavyweight	Sergey Chmel	def.	Manas Imarov	KO (knees and punches)	3	4:05
Featherweight	Alexander Kovalev	def.	Kamal Mamedov	Decision (unanimous) (30–27, 30–27, 30–27)	3	5:00
Welterweight	Ewerton Polaquini	def.	Mikhail Dolgov	Decision (unanimous) (29–28, 29–28, 29–28)	3	5:00
Welterweight	Dmitriy Zasinets	def.	Michel Silva	Decision (unanimous) (29–28, 29–28, 29–28)	3	5:00
Bantamweight	Mhitar Barseghyan	def.	Vazha Tsiptauri	Decision (split) (29–28, 28–29, 29–28)	3	5:00

== ACA 202: Johnson vs. Kornilov ==
ACA 202: Johnson vs. Kornilov
- Promotion: Absolute Championship Akhmat
- Date: April 12, 2026
- Venue: Yubileyny Sports Palace
- City: Saint Petersburg, Russia

ACA 202: Johnson vs. Kornilov was a mixed martial arts event promoted by Absolute Championship Akhmat that took place on April 12, 2026, in Saint Petersburg, Russia.

=== Background ===
A heavyweight bout between former ACA Heavyweight Champion Tony Johnson and Kirill Kornilov headlined the event.

=== Bonus awards ===
The following fighters received $20,000 bonus. The other finishes received $5,000 additional bonuses.

- Fight of the Night: Eduard Vartanyan ($20,000) vs. Uzair Abdurakov ($10,000)
- Performance of the Night: Khadis Ibragimov and Altynbek Mamashov

=== Results ===
Main card
Weight class				Method	Round	Time	Notes
Heavyweight	Kirill Kornilov	def.	Tony Johnson	Decision (unanimous) (50–45, 50–45, 50–44)	5	5:00
Welterweight	Eduard Vartanyan	def.	Uzair Abdurakov	Submission (rear-naked choke)	3	2:04
Bantamweight	Renat Ondar	def.	Osimkhon Rakhmonov	Decision (split) (29–28, 28–29, 29–28)	3	5:00
Heavyweight	Khadis Ibragimov	def.	Daniil Matsola	KO (punches)	1	1:00
Light Heavyweight	Asylzhan Bakhytzhanuly	def.	Maxim Grishin	Decision (unanimous) (30–27, 29–28, 29–28)	3	5:00
Preliminary card
Welterweight	Andrei Koshkin	def.	Vinicius Cruz	Decision (unanimous) (30–27, 29–28, 29–28)	3	5:00
Lightweight	Pavel Gordeev	def.	Brent Primus	Decision (unanimous) (30–27, 30–27, 30–27)	3	5:00
Bantamweight	Tomáš Deák	def.	Hayk Kazaryan	Decision (unanimous) (30–27, 29–28, 29–28)	3	5:00
Heavyweight	Anton Vinnikov	def.	Hamdy Abdelwahab	Decision (unanimous) (30–27, 30–27, 30–27)	3	5:00
Featherweight	Khafiz Sakibekov	def.	Daniel Oliveira	TKO (knee injury)	3	0:28
Welterweight	Oleg Dadonov	def.	Lincoln Puig	Decision (unanimous) (30–27, 30–27, 30–27)	3	5:00
Welterweight	Elias Silvério	def.	Evgeny Galochkin	Decision (unanimous) (29–28, 29–28, 29–28)	3	5:00
Middleweight	Altynbek Mamashov	def.	Ivan Bogdanov	KO (punch)	1	3:42
Light Heavyweight	Caio Bittencourt	def.	Artem Dushenko	Submission (heel hook)	1	1:30
Welterweight	Aslanbek Kodzaev	def.	Alexander Grebnev	Decision (unanimous) (30–27, 30–27, 30–27)	3	5:00

== ACA 203: Gaforov vs. Akopyan ==
ACA 203: Gaforov vs. Akopyan
- Promotion: Absolute Championship Akhmat
- Date: May 8, 2026
- Venue: Humo Arena
- City: Tashkent, Uzbekistan

ACA 203: Gaforov vs. Akopyan was a mixed martial arts event promoted by Absolute Championship Akhmat that took place on May 8, 2026, in Tashkent, Uzbekistan.

=== Background ===
The event marked the promotion's debut in Uzbekistan.

A flyweight title eliminator bout between Azam Gaforov and Aren Akopyan headlined the event.

=== Bonus awards ===
The following fighters received $20,000 bonus. The other finishes received $5,000 additional bonuses.

- Fight of the Night: Oyatullo Muminov ($20,000) vs. Azatbek Kochorov ($10,000)
- Performance of the Night: Ali Abdulkhalikov

=== Results ===
Main card
Weight class				Method	Round	Time	Notes
Flyweight	Aren Akopyan	def.	Azam Gaforov	Decision (unanimous) (49–46, 49–46, 50–45)	5	5:00	(Note: ACA Flyweight title eliminator.)
Catchweight (194 lb)	Faridun Odilov	def.	Dauren Ermekov	Decision (unanimous) (30–27, 30–27, 29–28)	3	5:00
Flyweight	Firdavs Zaripov	def.	Kholmurod Nurmatov	Submission (rear-naked choke)	2	2:14	(Note: Nurmatov missed weight (129.4 lb).)
Featherweight	Alimardan Abdykarov	def.	Dzhambulat Selimkhanov	Decision (unanimous) (30–27, 30–27, 29–28)	3	5:00
Middleweight	Edil Esengulov	def.	Ibragim Magomedov	Submission (arm-triangle choke)	3	3:41
Preliminary card
Lightweight	Ali Abdulkhalikov	def.	Amir Elzhurkaev	KO (punches)	1	2:58
Heavyweight	Zumso Zuraev	def.	Klidson Abreu	Submission (arm-triangle choke)	1	3:40
Lightweight	Alikhan Musaev	def.	Furkat Komilov	Decision (unanimous) (29–28, 29–28, 30–27)	3	5:00
Lightweight	Nemat Abdrashitov	def.	Apti Bimarzaev	Decision (unanimous) (29–28, 29–28, 29–28)	3	5:00
Flyweight	Emomakhdi Orzuzoda	def.	Anvar Abdullaev	Decision (unanimous) (30–27, 30–27, 29–28)	3	5:00
Lightweight	Mehdi Dakaev	def.	Nikita Podkovalnikov	Submission (rear-naked choke)	2	3:12
Featherweight	Sharif Kushaev	def.	Ali AlQaisi	Decision (unanimous) (29–28, 29–28, 29–28)	3	5:00
Featherweight	Shamil Boraev	def.	Shergazy Kenjebekov	Decision (unanimous) (29–28, 29–28, 30–27)	3	5:00	(Note: Boraev missed weight (151.7 lb).)
Welterweight	Tagir Magomedov	def.	Alexey Kunchenko	Decision (split) (29–28, 28–29, 30–27)	3	5:00
Bantamweight	Mekhroch Mamadshoev	def.	Dzhaddal Alibekov	Decision (split) (29–28, 28–29, 29–28)	3	5:00
Flyweight	Oyatullo Muminov	def.	Azatbek Kochorov	Decision (unanimous) (29–28, 29–28, 29–28)	3	5:00
Featherweight	Khasan Dadalov	def.	Kazakbai Tilenov	Submission (arm-triangle choke)	1	4:17

== ACA 204: Shlemenko vs. Dipchikov ==
ACA 204: Shlemenko vs. Dipchikov
- Promotion: Absolute Championship Akhmat
- Date: June 19, 2026
- Venue: G-Drive Arena
- City: Omsk, Russia

ACA 204: Shlemenko vs. Dipchikov was a mixed martial arts event promoted by Absolute Championship Akhmat that took place on June 19, 2026, in Omsk, Russia.

=== Background ===
The event marked the promotion's first visit to Omsk.

A middleweight bout between Ramazan Emeev and former Bellator Middleweight World Champion Alexander Shlemenko was scheduled to headline the event. However, Emeev withdrew from his bout due to suffering an injury and was replaced by Nikola Dipchikov.

=== Bonus awards ===
The following fighters received $20,000 bonus. The other finishes received $5,000 additional bonuses.

- Fight of the Night: No bonus awarded.
- Performance of the Night: Ruslan Shamilov, Sulim Batalov and Nashkho Galaev

=== Results ===
Main card
Weight class				Method	Round	Time	Notes
Middleweight	Alexander Shlemenko	def.	Nikola Dipchikov	Submission (rear-naked choke)	2	2:39
Heavyweight	Evgeniy Goncharov	def.	Khadis Ibragimov	Decision (unanimous) (30–27, 30–27, 29–28)	3	5:00
Welterweight	Alexey Shurkevich	def.	Chersi Dudaev	TKO (punches)	1	3:21
Heavyweight	Anton Vyazigin	def.	Mukhomad Vakhaev	TKO (retirement)	1	5:00
Middleweight	Ruslan Shamilov	def.	Dmitry Aryshev	TKO (punches)	2	1:36
Preliminary card
Featherweight	Gleb Khabibulin	vs.	Aleksandr Grozin	Draw (split) (28–29, 29–28, 29–29)	3	5:00	(Note: Grozin missed weight (149.3 lb).)
Lightweight	Alexander Matmuratov	def.	Magomed Sulumov	Decision (unanimous) (29–28, 29–28, 29–28)	3	5:00
Light Heavyweight	Sulim Batalov	def.	Leonardo Silva	KO (punch)	1	3:33
Middleweight	Artem Frolov	def.	Mark Hulme	TKO (punches)	2	3:18
Light Heavyweight	Shamil Abdulaev	def.	Ruslan Gabaraev	Decision (unanimous) (29–28, 29–28, 30–27)	3	5:00
Welterweight	Nikolay Aleksakhin	def.	Oganes Voskanyan	Decision (unanimous) (29–28, 29–28, 29–28)	3	5:00
Featherweight	Nashkho Galaev	def.	Vicente Vargas	KO (flying knee)	1	1:59
Middleweight	Vladimir Vasilyev	def.	Vladislav Yankovskiy	Decision (unanimous) (30–27, 30–27, 30–27)	3	5:00
Bantamweight	Eldar Munapov	def.	Vyacheslav Svischev	Submission (rear-naked choke)	1	3:48
Lightweight	Alexander Treskin	def.	Valeriy Dashkevich	Decision (unanimous) (29–28, 29–28, 29–28)	3	5:00
Lightweight	Tamerlan Temirov	def.	Akhmed Magomedov	Decision (split) (28–29, 30–27, 29–28)	3	5:00	(Note: Temirov missed weight (157.8 lb).)

== ACA 205: Magomedov vs. Gasanov ==
ACA 205: Magomedov vs. Gasanov
- Promotion: Absolute Championship Akhmat
- Date: July 17, 2026
- Venue: Almaty Arena
- City: Almaty, Kazakhstan

ACA 205: Magomedov vs. Gasanov was a mixed martial arts event promoted by Absolute Championship Akhmat that took place on July 17, 2026, in Almaty, Kazakhstan.

=== Background ===
The event marked the promotion's fifth visit to Almaty and first since ACA 192 in September 2025.

A ACA Light Heavyweight Championship bout between current two-time champion Muslim Magomedov and Elmar Gasanov headlined the event.

A ACA Bantamweight Championship bout between current champion Josiel Silva and Renat Ondar served as the co-main event.

=== Bonus awards ===
The following fighters received $20,000 bonus. The other finishes received $5,000 additional bonuses.

- Fight of the Night: No bonus awarded.
- Performance of the Night: Salamu Abdurakhmanov and Edil Esengulov

=== Results ===
Main card
Weight class				Method	Round	Time	Notes
Light Heavyweight	Muslim Magomedov (c)	def.	Elmar Gasanov	Decision (split) (47–48, 49–47, 48–47)	5	5:00	(Note: For the ACA Light Heavyweight Championship.)
Bantamweight	Josiel Silva (c)	def.	Renat Ondar	Decision (unanimous) (50–45, 49–46, 49–46)	5	5:00	(Note: For the ACA Bantamweight Championship.)
Lightweight	Artem Reznikov	vs.	Zaur Gadzhiev	Draw (split) (28–29, 29–28, 29–29)	3	5:00	(Note: Reznikov missed weight (161.4 lb).)
Middleweight	Dauren Ermekov	def.	Rene Pessoa	Submission (rear-naked choke)	2	2:58
Light Heavyweight	Asylzhan Bakhytzhanuly	def.	Vitaly Bigdash	Decision (unanimous) (29–28, 29–28, 29–28)	3	5:00
Light Heavyweight	Salamu Abdurakhmanov	def.	Caio Bittencourt	KO (punches)	1	4:55
Preliminary card
Middleweight	Edil Esengulov	def.	Abdul-Rahman Dzhanaev	TKO (punches)	1	2:04
Featherweight	Shamil Basaev	def.	Bagdos Olzhabay	TKO (punches)	1	0:32	(Note: Olzhabay missed weight (149.2 lb).)
Featherweight	Mehdi Baydulaev	def.	Gadzhimurad Aliev	Submission (rear-naked choke)	1	4:19
Bantamweight	Mansur Khatuev	def.	German Barsegyan	Submission (guillotine choke)	1	0:24
Welterweight	Khalid Satuev	def.	Elias Silvério	Decision (unanimous) (29–28, 29–28, 29–28)	3	5:00
Lightweight	Akhmed Gakiev	def.	Zhasulan Akimzhanov	Decision (majority) (29–28, 29–28, 29–29)	3	5:00
Bantamweight	Magomed Sardalov	def.	Erasyl Shukataev	Decision (unanimous) (29–28, 29–28, 29–28)	3	5:00
Featherweight	Turpal Gediev	def.	Nurbek Abdykadyrov	Submission (brabo choke)	2	2:14

== ACA 206: Vakhaev vs. Aliakbari ==
ACA 206: Vakhaev vs. Aliakbari
- Promotion: Absolute Championship Akhmat
- Date: August 15, 2026
- Venue: CSKA Arena
- City: Moscow, Russia

ACA 206: Vakhaev vs. Aliakbari was a mixed martial arts event promoted by Absolute Championship Akhmat that took place on August 15, 2026, in Moscow, Russia.

=== Background ===
A ACA Heavyweight Championship bout between current two-time champion Alikhan Vakhaev and Amir Aliakbari headlined the event.

A ACA Lightweight Championship bout between current champion Daud Shaikhaev and Bibert Tumenov was scheduled to serve as co-headline the event. However, for unknown reasons, the bout was never materialized.

=== Bonus awards ===
The following fighters received $20,000 bonus. The other finishes received $5,000 additional bonuses (the exception of Alikhan Suleymanov and Viskhan Kadirov didn’t receive their finish bonuses due to both missed weight in their bout).

- Fight of the Night: No bonus awarded.
- Performance of the Night: Alikhan Vakhaev, Osimkhon Rakhmonov and Vener Galiev

=== Results ===
Main card
Weight class				Method	Round	Time	Notes
Heavyweight	Alikhan Vakhaev (c)	def.	Amir Aliakbari	KO (punches)	1	3:38	(Note: For the ACA Heavyweight Championship.)
Middleweight	Faridun Odilov	def.	Altynbek Mamashov	Decision (unanimous) (29–28, 29–28, 29–28)	3	5:00
Bantamweight	Osimkhon Rakhmonov	def.	Tomáš Deák	KO (punch)	3	4:45
Bantamweight	Mekhroch Mamadshoev	def.	Pavel Vitruk	Decision (unanimous) (30–27, 30–27, 30–27)	3	5:00
Featherweight	Zhora Ayvazyan	def.	Yusup-Khadzhi Zubariev	Decision (unanimous) (30–27, 30–27, 30–27)	3	5:00
Preliminary card
Featherweight	Viskhan Kadirov	def.	Kafiz Sakibekov	KO (punches)	1	2:14	(Note: Kadirov missed weight (160.8 lb).)
Welterweight	Vitaliy Slipenko	def.	Michael Graves	TKO (leg injury)	1	5:00
Lightweight	Sidney Outlaw	def.	Rasul Magomedov	Submission (rear-naked choke)	2	3:16
Featherweight	Alikhan Suleymanov	def.	Denis Silva	TKO (knee and punches)	1	1:24	(Note: Suleymanov missed weight (149.4 lb).)
Lightweight	Vener Galiev	def.	Felipe Froes	KO (punches)	1	4:59
Welterweight	Erivan Pereira	def.	Artem Damkovsky	Decision (split) (29–28, 28–29, 29–28)	3	5:00
Lightweight	Pavel Gordeev	def.	Amirkhan Adaev	TKO (punches and elbows)	2	2:24
Featherweight	Saifullah Dzhabrailov	def.	Enrique Barzola	TKO (punches)	1	1:22

== ACA 207: Goncharov vs. Almeida ==
ACA 207: Goncharov vs. Almeida
- Promotion: Absolute Championship Akhmat
- Date: September 12, 2026
- Venue: Basket-Hall Krasnodar
- City: Krasnodar, Russia

ACA 207: Goncharov vs. Almeida was a mixed martial arts event promoted by Absolute Championship Akhmat that took place on September 12, 2026, in Krasnodar, Russia.

=== Background ===
A ACA Welterweight Championship bout between current champion Zhakshylyk Myrzabekov and former two-time champion Albert Tumenov was reportedly scheduled to headline the event. However, the bout was never materialized for unknown reasons.

A heavyweight bout between former two-time ACA Heavyweight Champion Evgeniy Goncharov and Jailton Almeida headlined the event.

=== Bonus awards ===
The following fighters received $20,000 bonus. The other finishes received $5,000 additional bonuses.

- Performance of the Night: Khasan Dadalov and Denis Maher

=== Results ===
Main card
Weight class				Method	Round	Time	Notes
Heavyweight	Evgeniy Goncharov	def.	Jailton Almeida	Decision (unanimous) (29–28, 29–28, 29–28)	3	5:00
Heavyweight	Kirill Kornilov	def.	Khadis Ibragimov	TKO (retirement)	2	5:00
Welterweight	Andrei Koshkin	def.	Herdeson Batista	Decision (split) (29–28, 28–29, 29–28)	3	5:00
Welterweight	Alexey Polpudnikov	def.	Mukhamed Kokov	TKO (punches)	2	3:36
Catchweight (161 lb)	Lucas Nascimento Almeida	def.	Vadim Ogar	Decision (unanimous) (29–28, 30–27, 30–27)	3	5:00
Preliminary card
Lightweight	Bogdan Plutakhin	def.	Nemat Abdrashitov	KO (punch)	2	2:01
Featherweight	Khasan Dadalov	def.	Bagama Nikabagamaev	KO (flying knee and punches)	1	3:50	(Note: Nikabagamaev missed weight (149.4 lb).)
Heavyweight	Anton Vinnikov	vs.	Arash Sadeghi	Draw (split) (27–30, 29–27, 28–28)	3	5:00
Catchweight (214 lb)	Arbi Aguev	def.	Evgeny Egemberdiev	Decision (unanimous) (30–27, 30–27, 29–28)	3	5:00
Bantamweight	Chermen Gobaev	def.	Akhmed Musakaev	Decision (unanimous) (29–28, 29–28, 29–28)	3	5:00	(Note: Musakaev missed weight (138.2 lb).)
Welterweight	Denis Maher	def.	Shamil Ramazanov	TKO (knee and punches)	2	4:37
Featherweight	Nikolai Galochkin	def.	Gegam Manavazyan	Submission (rear-naked choke)	1	1:45	(Note: Manavazyan missed weight (149.2 lb).)
Welterweight	Hacran Dias	def.	Ibragim Kantaev	Technical Submission (rear-naked choke)	1	4:32
Welterweight	Michel Silva	def.	Muslim Ibragimov	TKO (punch to the body)	1	4:18
Bantamweight	Murad Kalamov	def.	Ruslan Abiltarov	Submission (rear-naked choke)	2	4:11
Bantamweight	Sharapudin Magomedov	def.	Albert Misikov	Decision (unanimous) (30–27, 30–27, 30–27)	3	5:00	(Note: Misikov missed weight (141.4 lb).)

== ACA 208: Abdulvakhabov vs. Tibau ==
ACA 208: Abdulvakhabov vs. Tibau
- Promotion: Absolute Championship Akhmat
- Date: October 4, 2026
- Venue: Sport Hall Colosseum
- City: Grozny, Russia

ACA 208: Abdulvakhabov vs. Tibau was a mixed martial arts event promoted by Absolute Championship Akhmat that took place on October 4, 2026, in Grozny, Russia.

=== Background ===
A ACA Lightweight Championship bout between current champion Daud Shaikhaev and Bibert Tumenov was scheduled to serve as event headliner. The bout was originally scheduled to take place at ACA 206 in August, but the bout was never materialized for unknown reasons. In turn, the bout was cancelled during the event due to Shaikhaev's health issues.

As a result, a welterweight bout between former two-time ACA Lightweight Champion Abdul-Aziz Abdulvakhabov and Gleison Tibau was elevated to the new main event.

=== Bonus awards ===
The following fighters received $20,000 bonus. The other finishes received $5,000 additional bonuses.

- Fight of the Night: Dzhambulat Selimkhanov vs. Kurban Taygibov
- Performance of the Night: Adlan Ibragimov

=== Results ===
Main card
Weight class				Method	Round	Time	Notes
Welterweight	Abdul-Aziz Abdulvakhabov	def.	Gleison Tibau	Decision (unanimous) (29–28, 30–27, 29–28)	3	5:00
Featherweight	Abdul-Rakhman Dudaev	def.	Vicente Vargas	Decision (unanimous) (29–28, 30–27, 30–27)	3	5:00
Featherweight	Dzhambulat Selimkhanov	def.	Kurban Taygibov	Decision (unanimous) (30–27, 30–27, 30–27)	3	5:00
Light Heavyweight	Adlan Ibragimov	def.	Sergey Starodub	KO (punch)	3	0:21
Preliminary card
Catchweight (140 lb)	Alexander Podlesniy	def.	Rustam Kerimov	Decision (unanimous) (29–28, 29–28, 29–28)	3	5:00
Middleweight	Abdul-Rakhman Dzhanaev	def.	Mikhail Dolgov	Decision (unanimous) (29–28, 29–28, 29–28)	3	5:00
Heavyweight	Kirill Grishenko	def.	Daniil Matsola	Decision (unanimous) (29–28, 29–28, 30–27)	3	5:00
Lightweight	Magomed Sulumov	def.	Sheymon Moraes	Decision (unanimous) (29–28, 30–27, 30–27)	3	5:00
Welterweight	Herbert Batista	def.	Uzair Abdurakov	Decision (unanimous) (29–28, 29–28, 29–28)	3	5:00
Featherweight	Timur Valiev	def.	Shamil Boraev	Submission (kneebar)	2	1:47
Bantamweight	Francisco Figueiredo	def.	Yunus Evloev	TKO (elbows)	3	0:58
Middleweight	Mark Hulme	def.	Murad Abdulaev	Decision (unanimous) (30–27, 30–27, 30–27)	3	5:00
Flyweight	Umalat Israpilov	def.	Kurban Gadzhiev	Decision (unanimous) (29–28, 29–28, 29–28)	3	5:00	(Note: Israpilov missed weight (129.3 lb).)
Lightweight	Imam Vitakhanov	def.	Magnus Kelly Conrado	KO (punches)	1	1:42
Light Heavyweight	Husein Kushagov	def.	Evgeny Erokhin	Decision (unanimous) (29–28, 29–28, 29–28)	3	5:00
Lightweight	Ali Suleymanov	def.	Murad Khasaev	Decision (unanimous) (30–27, 30–27, 30–26)	3	5:00
Early preliminary card
Light Heavyweight	Magomed Malsagov	def.	Artur Astakhov	Decision (unanimous) (30–27, 30–27, 30–27)	3	5:00
Lightweight	Renan Oliveira	def.	Tamerlan Ashakhanov	Decision (unanimous) (29–28, 29–28, 29–28)	3	5:00
Flyweight	Vazha Tsiptauri	def.	Ramzan Suleymanov	KO (head kick and punches)	1	0:44	(Note: Suleymanov missed weight (128.6 lb).)
Bantamweight	Asvad Akhmadov	def.	Murat Fakov	Decision (unanimous) (29–28, 29–28, 29–28)	3	5:00
Bantamweight	Islam Geroev	def.	Alan Gomes de Castro	Decision (unanimous) (29–28, 29–28, 30–27)	3	5:00

== ACA 209: Frolov vs. Odilov ==
ACA 209: Frolov vs. Odilov
- Promotion: Absolute Championship Akhmat
- Date: October 30, 2026
- Venue: Palace of Tennis and Water Sports Complex
- City: Dushanbe, Tajikistan

ACA 209: Frolov vs. Odilov was a mixed martial arts event promoted by Absolute Championship Akhmat that took place on October 30, 2026, in Dushanbe, Tajikistan.

=== Background ===
The event marked the promotion's fourth visit to Dushanbe and first since before it was rebranded promotion at ACB 68 in August 2017.

A middleweight bout between Artem Frolov and Faridun Odilov headlined the event.

=== Bonus awards ===
The following fighters received $20,000 bonus. The other finishes received $5,000 additional bonuses.

- Fight of the Night: Bektur Zhenishbek Uulu vs. Oyatullo Muminov
- Performance of the Night: Felipe Bunes and Kuat Khamitov

=== Results ===
Main card
Weight class				Method	Round	Time	Notes
Middleweight	Faridun Odilov	def.	Artem Frolov	Decision (unanimous) (30–27, 30–27, 30–27)	3	5:00
Flyweight	Felipe Bunes	def.	Azam Gaforov	Submission (twister)	1	4:13	(Note: Gaforov missed weight (129.4 lb).)
Featherweight	Bekhruz Zukhurov	def.	Viskhan Kadirov	TKO (punches)	1	1:28
Welterweight	Kuat Khamitov	def.	Alexey Makhno	TKO (punches)	2	0:44
Flyweight	Firdavs Zaripov	def.	Vagiz Ismagilov	Submission (rear-naked choke)	1	1:25
Preliminary card
Lightweight	Alikhan Musaev	def.	Jahongir Saidjamolov	TKO (punches)	2	2:36
Lightweight	Kafiz Sakibekov	def.	Nikita Podkovalnikov	Decision (unanimous) (30–27, 30–27, 30–27)	3	5:00
Catchweight (150 lb)	Tural Ragimov	def.	Nashkho Galaev	Decision (unanimous) (29–28, 29–27, 29–28)	3	5:00	(Note: Ragimov missed weight (151 lb).)
Heavyweight	Klidson Abreu	def.	Hamdy Abdelwahab	Decision (unanimous) (30–26, 30–26, 30–26)	3	5:00	(Note: Abdelwahab was deducted one point in round 3 due to knee to groin.)
Flyweight	Bektur Zhenishbek Uulu	def.	Oyatullo Muminov	Decision (unanimous) (29–28, 29–28, 29–28)	3	5:00
Bantamweight	Hayk Kazaryan	def.	Eldar Munapov	Decision (split) (29–28, 28–29, 29–28)	3	5:00
Flyweight	Emomakhdi Orzuzoda	def.	Kholmurod Nurmatov	Decision (unanimous) (30–27, 30–27, 30–27)	3	5:00
Bantamweight	Bakhtovar Yunusov	def.	Saidyokub Kakhramonov	Decision (unanimous) (30–27, 30–27, 30–26)	3	5:00
Flyweight	Akhmed Khamzaev	def.	Mustafa Ashurzoda	Submission (rear-naked choke)	1	3:26
Welterweight	Sayed Safarmamadov	def.	Ali Mashrapov	TKO (doctor stoppage)	1	5:00
Lightweight	Nizambek Abdrashitov	def.	Shadid Abdurazakov	Decision (unanimous) (29–28, 30–27, 29–28)	3	5:00
Welterweight	Mamurzhon Khamdamov	def.	Ivan Soloviev	TKO (punches)	2	3:52

== ACA 210: Myrzabekov vs. Tumenov ==
ACA 210: Myrzabekov vs. Tumenov
- Promotion: Absolute Championship Akhmat
- Date: December 4, 2026
- Venue: Zhashtyk Arena
- City: Bishkek, Kyrgyzstan

ACA 210: Myrzabekov vs. Tumenov is an upcoming mixed martial arts event promoted by Absolute Championship Akhmat that is scheduled to take place on December 4, 2026, in Bishkek, Kyrgyzstan.

=== Background ===
The event will mark the promotion's debut in Kyrgyzstan.

A ACA Welterweight Championship bout between current champion Zhakshylyk Myrzabekov and former two-time champion Albert Tumenov is scheduled to headline the event. The bout was originally scheduled to headline at ACA 207 in September, but the bout was never materialized for unknown reasons.

A ACA Featherweight Championship bout between Alimardan Abdykaarov and Makharbek Karginov is scheduled to serve as the co-main event. They previously competed in August 2025 at ACA 190, where Karginov won by unanimous decision.

=== Fight card ===
Main card
Weight class				Method	Round	Time	Notes
Welterweight	Zhakshylyk Myrzabekov (c)	vs.	Albert Tumenov				(Note: For the ACA Welterweight Championship.)
Featherweight	Alimardan Abdykaarov	vs.	Makharbek Karginov				(Note: For the vacant ACA Featherweight Championship.)
Middleweight	Edil Esengulov	vs.	Ruslan Shamilov
Middleweight	Altynbek Mamashov	vs.	Ibragim Magomedov
Welterweight	Vinicius Cruz	vs.	Khalid Satuev
Preliminary card
Lightweight	Nemat Abdrashitov	vs.	Olzhas Eskaraev
Bantamweight	Azatbek Kochorov	vs.	Aivaz Aidinov
Light Heavyweight	Asylzhan Bakhytzhanuly	vs.	Alexey Butorin
Featherweight	Shergazy Kenjebekov	vs.	Dzhaddal Alibekov
Featherweight	Kazakbai Tilenov	vs.	Turpal Gediev
Bantamweight	Kairat Akhmetov	vs.	Ruslan Kasymaly Uulu

== See also ==
- List of current ACA fighters
- 2026 in UFC
- 2026 in ONE Championship
- 2026 in Professional Fighters League
- 2026 in Konfrontacja Sztuk Walki
- 2026 in Legacy Fighting Alliance
- 2026 in Rizin Fighting Federation
- 2026 in LUX Fight League
- 2026 in Oktagon MMA
- 2026 in Brave Combat Federation
- 2026 in Cage Warriors
- 2026 in UAE Warriors
