= Kyle Bochniak =

American MMA fighter

- Born: February 5, 1987 (age 39); Gloucester, Massachusetts, United States
- Other names: Crash
- Height: 5 ft 7 in (1.70 m)
- Weight: 145 lb (66 kg; 10.4 st)
- Division: Featherweight
- Reach: 70.0 in (178 cm)
- Fighting out of: Boston, Massachusetts, United States
- Team: Broadway Jiu-Jitsu; North Andover BJJ
- Rank: Black Belt in Brazilian Jiu-Jitsu
- Years active: 2014–present

Mixed martial arts record
- Total: 18
- Wins: 11
- By knockout: 2
- By submission: 2
- By decision: 7
- Losses: 7
- By knockout: 1
- By decision: 6

Amateur record
- Total: 6
- Wins: 5
- Losses: 1

Other information
- Mixed martial arts record from Sherdog

Kyle Bochniak (born February 5, 1987) is an American mixed martial artist currently competing in the Featherweight division. A professional competitor since 2014, he has competed in the Ultimate Fighting Championship, Professional Fighters League (PFL), and CES MMA.

Bochniak also runs his own gym, North Andover BJJ, which he opened in January 2023.

== Background ==
Bochniak associated with the wrong crowd when he was growing up where he was drinking excessively and engaging in substance abuse activities. His unhealthy habits led him to drop out of school, and he was in a coma for a week due to overdosing on prescription pills. Bochniak eventually ended up in jail where he found out his father, who left his mother when Bochniak was two, was in the next cell from his. Bochniak realized he did not want to end up like his father, so he made a pledge with the judge with a heartfelt arraignment speech. The judge granted Bochniak five year probation of his offense where he was transferred to Hartford, Connecticut. In Hartford, Bochniak started learning welding and eventually landed a job as a welder. He later stumbled into Broadway Jiu-Jitsu where he started his journey to be a mixed martial artist, which turned his life around.

Today I celebrate a decade of sobriety and staying out of trouble. I’d be lying if I said it was easy. Not sure what’s more important sometimes... either to look back on my past or look forward to the future. One thing you’ll hear in the halls a lot is, “one day at a time” or better yet, “one minute at a time.” These two phrases stuck with me when I heard them for the first time at a very young age. I wouldn’t say I’m a changed man just a different way of thinking. Once you stop blaming the world for life going to shit and realize you had a choice all along it becomes a little bit easier. I know some people get dealt with a less to sub-par life but still, there’s always a choice. I wasn’t going to post anything today because it’s my personal life but I remembered this one day when I heard a man speak in an AA meeting once, “If there’s one person in this room that is hearing me and that I could potentially save from a life of shit and misery then that’s all that counts.” I hope someone heard me. Things will never be easy but they can be worth it. God bless.

== Mixed martial arts career ==
=== Early career ===
He began training in mixed martial arts in 2010 and starting competing in amateur fights a year later. After compiling a record of 5–1 as an amateur, he started fighting professionally in 2014.

Bochniak compiled an undefeated record of 6–0 on the regional circuit, competing exclusively for CES MMA in nearby Rhode Island. He was signed by the UFC in early 2016.

=== Ultimate Fighting Championship ===
Bochniak made his promotional debut on January 17, 2016, as a short notice replacement for Jimy Hettes against Charles Rosa at UFC Fight Night 81. Despite knocking Rosa down in the first round, Bochniak lost the fight via unanimous decision.

Bochniak returned to face Enrique Barzola on August 27, 2016, at UFC on Fox 21. He won the fight via split decision.

Bochniak was expected to face Godofredo Pepey on March 11, 2017, at UFC Fight Night 106. However, both fighters pulled out of the fight during the week leading up to the event citing injuries and the bout was scrapped.

Bochniak faced Jeremy Kennedy on July 22, 2017, at UFC on Fox 25. He lost the fight via unanimous decision.

Bochniak faced Brandon Davis on January 20, 2018, at UFC 220. He won the fight via unanimous decision.

Bochniak faced Zabit Magomedsharipov on April 7, 2018, at UFC 223. He lost the fight by unanimous decision. The fight earned him a Fight of the Night bonus.

Bochniak faced Hakeem Dawodu on December 8, 2018, at UFC 231. He lost the fight via split decision.

Bochniak faced promotional newcomer Sean Woodson on October 18, 2019, at UFC on ESPN: Reyes vs. Weidman. He lost the fight via unanimous decision.

On January 9, 2020, it was announced that Bochniak was released by UFC.

=== Post-UFC career ===
Bochniak was scheduled to face Jonathan Gary in a featherweight bout at CES MMA 61 on April 24, 2020. However, the event was postponed indefinitely due to the COVID-19 pandemic.

Bochniak was then scheduled to fight Tim Teves at Taura MMA 11 on October 30, 2020. However, the bout was cancelled due to an unknown reason.

Bochniak then faced Caio Uruguai at XMMA 1 on January 30, 2021. He won the fight via unanimous decision.

Bochniak was scheduled to face Derek Campos at XMMA 2 on July 30, 2021. However Campos withdrew due to injury and was replaced by Marcus Brimage. He won the fight via unanimous decision.

Bochniak faced Carlton Minus on April 2, 2022, at XMMA 4. He won the bout via split decision.

=== Professional Fighters League ===
Bochniak, replacing Sung Bin Jo, faced Bubba Jenkins on April 28, 2022, at PFL 2. He lost the bout via unanimous decision.

Bochniak faced Chris Wade on June 24, 2022, at PFL 5. He lost the bout via head kick and then ground and pound TKO in the first round.

== Championships and accomplishments ==
- Ultimate Fighting Championship
  - Fight of the Night (One time) vs. Zabit Magomedsharipov
  - UFC.com Awards
    - 2018: Ranked #10 Fight of the Year vs. Zabit Magomedsharipov

== Mixed martial arts record ==
Professional record breakdown
18 matches	11 wins	7 losses
By knockout	2	1
By submission	2	0
By decision	7	6

Res.	Record	Opponent	Method	Event	Date	Round	Time	Location	Notes
Loss	11–7	Chris Wade	TKO (head kick and punches)	PFL 5	June 24, 2022	1	1:10	Atlanta, Georgia, United States	
Loss	11–6	Bubba Jenkins	Decision (unanimous)	PFL 2	April 28, 2022	3	5:00	Arlington, Texas, United States	
Win	11–5	Carlton Minus	Decision (split)	XMMA 4: Black Magic	April 2, 2022	3	5:00	New Orleans, Louisiana, United States	
Win	10–5	Marcus Brimage	Decision (unanimous)	XMMA 2: Saunders vs. Nijem	July 30, 2021	3	5:00	Greenville, South Carolina, United States	
Win	9–5	Caio Uruguai	Decision (unanimous)	XMMA: Vick vs Fialho	January 30, 2021	3	5:00	West Palm Beach, Florida, United States	
Loss	8–5	Sean Woodson	Decision (unanimous)	UFC on ESPN: Reyes vs. Weidman	October 18, 2019	3	5:00	Boston, Massachusetts, United States	
Loss	8–4	Hakeem Dawodu	Decision (split)	UFC 231	December 8, 2018	3	5:00	Toronto, Ontario, Canada	
Loss	8–3	Zabit Magomedsharipov	Decision (unanimous)	UFC 223	April 7, 2018	3	5:00	Brooklyn, New York, United States	Fight of the Night.
Win	8–2	Brandon Davis	Decision (unanimous)	UFC 220	January 20, 2018	3	5:00	Boston, Massachusetts, United States	
Loss	7–2	Jeremy Kennedy	Decision (unanimous)	UFC on Fox: Weidman vs. Gastelum	July 22, 2017	3	5:00	Uniondale, New York, United States	
Win	7–1	Enrique Barzola	Decision (split)	UFC on Fox: Maia vs. Condit	August 27, 2016	3	5:00	Vancouver, British Columbia, Canada	
Loss	6–1	Charles Rosa	Decision (unanimous)	UFC Fight Night: Dillashaw vs. Cruz	January 17, 2016	3	5:00	Boston, Massachusetts, United States	
Win	6–0	Taylor Trahan	Submission (rear-naked choke)	CES MMA 32	January 8, 2016	1	3:58	Lincoln, Rhode Island, United States	Catchweight (150 lbs) bout.
Win	5–0	Dominic Warr	KO (punch)	CES MMA 28	March 13, 2015	1	1:49	Lincoln, Rhode Island, United States	
Win	4–0	Tom English	Decision (unanimous)	CES MMA 27	January 30, 2015	3	5:00	Lincoln, Rhode Island, United States	
Win	3–0	Ruslan Khubejashvili	Decision (unanimous)	CES MMA 26	October 10, 2014	3	5:00	Lincoln, Rhode Island, United States	Featherweight debut.
Win	2–0	Marius Enache	TKO (punches)	CES MMA 22	March 14, 2014	2	1:44	Lincoln, Rhode Island, United States	Lightweight debut.
Win	1–0	Peter Bertucci	Submission (rear-naked choke)	CES MMA 21	January 24, 2014	1	1:05	Lincoln, Rhode Island, United States	Catchweight (150 lbs) bout.

== See also ==
- List of male mixed martial artists
