= Klidson Abreu =

Brazilian mixed martial artist (born 1992)

- Born: 24 December 1992 (age 33); Manaus, Amazonas, Brazil
- Other names: White Bear
- Height: 6 ft 0 in (183 cm)
- Weight: 258 lb (117 kg; 18 st 6 lb)
- Division: Light heavyweight Heavyweight
- Reach: 74 in (188 cm)
- Fighting out of: Curitiba, Parana, Brazil
- Team: Evolução Thai MMA; Gracie Barra
- Years active: 2011–present

Mixed martial arts record
- Total: 29
- Wins: 18
- By knockout: 5
- By submission: 10
- By decision: 3
- Losses: 9
- By knockout: 4
- By submission: 1
- By decision: 4
- No contests: 2

Other information
- Mixed martial arts record from Sherdog

Klidson Abreu (born 24 December 1992) is a Brazilian mixed martial artist competing in the Heavyweight division. He formerly competed in the Ultimate Fighting Championship (UFC) and Professional Fighters League (PFL).

== Mixed martial arts career ==
=== Early career ===
Abreu compiled a professional mixed martial arts record of 14-2 fighting within the Brazilian regional MMA circuit as well as in Paraguay, United Arab Emirates and Russia for over 7 years winning various regional MMA titles before signing for UFC in January 2019.

=== Ultimate Fighting Championship ===
Abreu made his UFC debut at light heavyweight against Magomed Ankalaev on 23 February 2019 at UFC Fight Night: Błachowicz vs. Santos. He lost the fight via unanimous decision.

Abreu then faced Sam Alvey on 20 July 2019 at UFC on ESPN: dos Anjos vs. Edwards. He won the fight via unanimous decision.

Abreu next faced Shamil Gamzatov on 9 November 2019 at UFC Fight Night: Magomedsharipov vs. Kattar. He lost the fight via split decision.

Abreu was initially targeted to face Gadzhimurad Antigulov on 13 June 2020 at UFC Kazakhstan. Subsequently, the Kazakhstan event was later cancelled due to the COVID-19 pandemic. As a result, Abreu was rescheduled to face Jamahal Hill on 30 May 2020 at UFC on ESPN: Woodley vs. Burns. He initially lost the fight via technical knockout in the first round, but the fight was later overturned on 3 September because Hill tested positive for marijuana.

On 10 August 2020, it was announced that the UFC released him.

=== Professional Fighters League ===
On 1 June 2021, it was announced that Abreu was signed by the PFL and he made his debut on 25 June 2021 at PFL 6 against Jamelle Jones. He lost the bout after being knocked out in the first round.

Klidson was scheduled to face Ali Isaev on April 28, 2022, at PFL 2. However, Isaev pulled out of the bout and was replaced by Adam Keresh. He won the bout via unanimous decision.

Klidson faced Renan Ferreira on June 24, 2022, at PFL 5. In an upset, Klidson won the bout via unanimous decision. The Georgia Athletic and Entertainment Commission overturned the result of the bout to a no contest, after Abreu failed a drug test for unspecified substances. Klidson and his team contended that the positive was due to prescribed antibiotics for a leg laceration.

== Championships and accomplishments ==
- Brave Combat Federation
  - Brave CF Light Heavyweight Championship (One time)
    - One successful title defence
- Samurai Fight Combat
  - Samurai FC Heavyweight Championship (One time)

== Mixed martial arts record ==
Professional record breakdown
29 matches	18 wins	9 losses
By knockout	5	4
By submission	10	1
By decision	3	4
No contests	2	

Res.	Record	Opponent	Method	Event	Date	Round	Time	Location	Notes
Win	18–9 (2)	Hamdy Abdelwahab	Decision (unanimous)	ACA 209	October 31, 2026	3	5:00	Dushanbe, Tajikistan	Abdelwahab was deducted one point in round 3 due to knee to groin.
Loss	17–9 (2)	Zumso Zuraev	Submission (arm-triangle choke)	ACA 203	May 8, 2026	1	3:40	Tashkent, Uzbekistan	
Loss	17–8 (2)	Kirill Grishenko	Decision (unanimous)	ACA 201	March 27, 2026	3	5:00	Minsk, Belarus	
Loss	17–7 (2)	Arash Sadeghi	TKO (elbows and punches)	ACA 194	October 23, 2025	2	3:32	Dubai, United Arab Emirates	
Win	17–6 (2)	Adam Bogatyrev	TKO (leg injury)	ACA 191	September 5, 2025	1	0:19	Krasnodar, Russia	
Loss	16–6 (2)	Mukhamad Vakhaev	Decision (unanimous)	ACA 182	December 14, 2024	3	5:00	Moscow, Russia	
NC	16–5 (2)	Renan Ferreira	NC (overturned)	PFL 5 (2022)	June 24, 2022	3	5:00	Atlanta, Georgia, United States	Originally a unanimous decision win for Abreu; overturned after he tested positive for banned substances.
Win	16–5 (1)	Adam Keresh	Decision (unanimous)	PFL 2 (2022)	April 28, 2022	3	5:00	Arlington, Texas, United States	
Loss	15–5 (1)	Jamelle Jones	KO (punches)	PFL 6 (2021)	June 25, 2021	1	1:43	Atlantic City, New Jersey, United States	Return to Heavyweight.
NC	15–4 (1)	Jamahal Hill	NC (overturned)	UFC on ESPN: Woodley vs. Burns	May 30, 2020	1	1:51	Las Vegas, Nevada, United States	Originally a TKO (knee to the body and punches) win for Hill; overturned after he tested positive for marijuana.
Loss	15–4	Shamil Gamzatov	Decision (split)	UFC Fight Night: Magomedsharipov vs. Kattar	November 9, 2019	3	5:00	Moscow, Russia	
Win	15–3	Sam Alvey	Decision (unanimous)	UFC on ESPN: dos Anjos vs. Edwards	July 20, 2019	3	5:00	San Antonio, Texas, United States	
Loss	14–3	Magomed Ankalaev	Decision (unanimous)	UFC Fight Night: Błachowicz vs. Santos	February 23, 2019	3	5:00	Prague, Czech Republic	
Win	14–2	Anton Vyazigin	Submission (straight armbar)	M-1 Challenge 99	November 17, 2018	2	3:16	Nazran, Russia	Heavyweight bout.
Win	13–2	Viktor Nemkov	Submission (rear-naked choke)	RCC 3	July 9, 2018	2	1:02	Yekaterinburg, Russia	
Win	12–2	Matt Baker	Submission (rear-naked choke)	Brave CF 11	April 13, 2018	1	3:01	Belo Horizonte, Brazil	Defended the Brave CF Light Heavyweight Championship.
Win	11–2	Timo Feucht	Submission (armbar)	Brave CF 8	August 12, 2017	2	4:01	Curitiba, Brazil	Won the inaugural Brave CF Light Heavyweight Championship.
Win	10–2	Artur Guseinov	Submission (rear-naked choke)	Brave CF 4	March 31, 2017	1	3:42	Abu Dhabi, United Arab Emirates	
Win	9–2	Leonardo Silva de Oliveira	TKO (doctors stoppage)	Jungle Fight 90	September 3, 2016	3	1:58	São Paulo, Brazil	
Loss	8–2	Bruno Cappelozza	TKO (punches)	Jungle Fight 87	May 21, 2016	3	3:08	São Paulo, Brazil	Light heavyweight debut. For the vacant Jungle Fight Light Heavyweight Championship.
Win	8–1	Johnny Walker	Submission (rear-naked choke)	Samurai FC 12	October 10, 2015	2	3:10	Curitiba, Brazil	Won the vacant Samurai FC Heavyweight Championship.
Win	7–1	Morris Albert Lins	TKO (punches)	Sierra Fighting Championship 1	August 22, 2015	1	1:06	Orleans, Brazil	
Loss	6–1	Peterson Leite	TKO (punches)	Extreme Fighter 6	December 13, 2014	3	4:16	Pedro Juan Caballero, Paraguay	
Win	6–0	Eli Reger Schablatura Pinto	Submission	West Combat 1	November 9, 2013	1	1:55	Marechal Cândido Rondon, Brazil	
Win	5–0	Alex Junius	Submission (rear-naked choke)	Mr. Fighter Combat	June 8, 2013	2	4:10	Toleno, Brazil	
Win	4–0	Matheus Scheffel	Submission (rear-naked choke)	Beltrao Combat 2	November 10, 2012	1	0:46	Morretes, Brazil	
Win	3–0	Ari Souza	KO (punches)	Ring of Fire 4	August 28, 2012	1	3:02	Presidente Venceslau, Brazil	
Win	2–0	Jose Rodolfo Goncalves Firmino	TKO	Beltrao Combat 1	May 19, 2012	1	0:40	Francisco Beltrao, Brazil	
Win	1–0	Jeferson Miranda	Submission	Cruzeiro Combat 1	November 13, 2011	1	N/A	Cruzeiro do Iguaçu, Brazil	Heavyweight debut.

== See also ==
- List of male mixed martial artists
