= Julio Arce =

American mixed martial artist

- Born: October 27, 1989 (age 37); Miami, Florida, United States
- Height: 5 ft 7 in (1.70 m)
- Weight: 147 lb (67 kg; 10 st 7 lb)
- Division: Featherweight; Bantamweight
- Reach: 70 in (178 cm)
- Fighting out of: Queens, New York, United States
- Team: Team Tiger Schulmann
- Rank: 2nd degree black belt in MMA under Daniel "Tiger" Schulmann
- Years active: 2012–present

Mixed martial arts record
- Total: 29
- Wins: 22
- By knockout: 7
- By submission: 5
- By decision: 10
- Losses: 7
- By knockout: 1
- By submission: 1
- By decision: 5

Other information
- Mixed martial arts record from Sherdog

Julio Arce (born October 27, 1989) is an American mixed martial artist. He currently compete in the Featherweight division of the Professional Fighters League. Arce competed in the Bantamweight division in the UFC.

== Background ==
Arce was born in Florida but moved to Colombia as a child, returning stateside around the age of ten. He graduated from Benjamin N. Cardozo High School and got his associate degree in business afterwards.

At fourteen and weighing 200 pounds, Arce joined Team Tiger Schulmann combat gym to lose weight. He started training, competed in kickboxing, and won the New York Golden Gloves championship in 2011 in boxing prior to transitioning to MMA in 2012.

== Mixed martial arts career ==
=== Early career ===
Arce started his professional MMA career in 2012 and fought most of his fights in Ring of Combat promotion and he was the bantamweight and featherweight champion. He amassed a record of 8–1 before signed by UFC.

=== Dana White's Contender Series ===
Arce appeared in Dana White's Contender Series 5 web series program. He faced Peter Petties and won the fight via technical knockout. Even with the win, Arce was not awarded a UFC contract at that event. However, he was later signed by the UFC on short notice to replace an injured Charles Rosa at UFC 220.

=== Ultimate Fighting Championship ===
Arce made his UFC debut on January 20, 2018, against Dan Ige, replacing an injured Charles Rosa at UFC 220. He won the fight via unanimous decision with the scoreboard of (30-27, 30–27, 29–28).

His next fight came on June 1, 2018, at UFC Fight Night 131 against Daniel Teymur. He won the fight via a rear-naked choke in the third round.

Arce faced Sheymon Moraes on November 3, 2018, at UFC 230. He lost the fight via split decision.

Arce faced Julian Erosa on May 18, 2019, at UFC Fight Night 152. He won the fight via knockout in the third round.

Arce faced Hakeem Dawodu on November 2, 2019, at UFC 244. He lost the fight by a split decision.

Arce was expected to face Timur Valiev on a bantamweight bout on February 6, 2021, at UFC Fight Night 184. However, Arce was removed from the event in late January due to undisclosed reasons and replaced by Martin Day.

Arce faced Andre Ewell on July 24, 2021, at UFC on ESPN: Sandhagen vs. Dillashaw. He won in the second round via technical knockout.

Arce faced Song Yadong on November 13, 2021, at UFC Fight Night 197. He lost the fight via technical knockout in round two.

As the first fight of his new four-fight contract, Arce faced Daniel Santos on April 9, 2022, at UFC 273. At the weigh-ins, Arce weighed in at 136.5 pounds, half a pound over the bantamweight non-title fight limit. The bout proceeded at a catchweight and he forfeited 20% of his purse which went to Santos. He won the bout via unanimous decision.

Arce faced Montel Jackson on November 12, 2022, at UFC 281. He lost the fight via unanimous decision.

Arce was scheduled to face Cody Garbrandt on March 4, 2023, at UFC 285. However, Arce withdrew in late January due to a knee injury and was replaced by Trevin Jones.

Arce faced Herbert Burns on March 30, 2024, at UFC on ESPN 54. At the weigh ins, Arce weighed in at 147.25 pounds, one and a quarter pounds over the featherweight non-title fight limit. His bout proceeded at catchweight and he was fined 20 percent of his purse which went to his opponent Burns. Arce won the fight via technical knockout in round two.

=== Global Fight League ===
On January 24, 2025, it was announced that Arce had parted ways with the UFC and signed with the Global Fight League. However, in April 2025, it was reported that all GFL events were cancelled indefinitely.

=== Professional Fighters League ===
After winning two fight in the independent promotion, Arce made his PFL debut against Alexei Pergande on March 28, 2026, at PFL Pittsburgh. He lost the fight via unanimous decision.

Arce faced Caolán Loughran on July 18, 2026, at PFL Austin. He won the fight via unanimous decision.

== Championships and accomplishments ==
=== Mixed martial arts ===
- Ultimate Fighting Championship
  - Highest takedown defense percentage in UFC history (96.2%)
- Ring of Combat
  - Ring of Combat Bantamweight Champion (one time; former)
    - Three successful title defenses
  - Right of Combat Featherweight Champion (one time; former)
    - Two successful title defenses

=== Boxing ===
- Golden Gloves
  - Golden Gloves 2011 Champion

== Personal life ==
Arce is a head instructor at the Tiger Schulmann’s Bayside location in Queens, NY.

== Mixed martial arts record ==
Professional record breakdown
29 matches	22 wins	7 losses
By knockout	7	1
By submission	5	1
By decision	10	5

Res.	Record	Opponent	Method	Event	Date	Round	Time	Location	Notes
Win	22–7	Caolán Loughran	Decision (unanimous)	PFL Austin: Eblen vs. Kasanganay 2	July 18, 2026	3	5:00	Austin, Texas, United States	
Loss	21–7	Alexei Pergande	Decision (unanimous)	PFL Pittsburgh: Eblen vs. Battle	March 28, 2026	3	5:00	Moon Township, Pennsylvania, United States	
Win	21–6	Wilson Reis	KO (punch)	Victory Fighting League: Clash of the Champions	October 24, 2025	1	2:00	New York City, New York, United States	
Win	20–6	Sheymon Moraes	Decision (unanimous)	Victory Fighting League: Battle of the Burroughs	August 15, 2025	3	5:00	New York City, New York, United States	
Win	19–6	Herbert Burns	TKO (punches)	UFC on ESPN: Blanchfield vs. Fiorot	March 30, 2024	2	2:00	Atlantic City, New Jersey, United States	Return to Featherweight; Arce missed weight (147.25 lb). Burns was deducted one point in round 1 due to repeated illegal groin strikes.
Loss	18–6	Montel Jackson	Decision (unanimous)	UFC 281	November 12, 2022	3	5:00	New York City, New York, United States	
Win	18–5	Daniel Santos	Decision (unanimous)	UFC 273	April 9, 2022	3	5:00	Jacksonville, Florida, United States	Catchweight (136.5 lb) bout; Arce missed weight.
Loss	17–5	Song Yadong	TKO (head kick and punches)	UFC Fight Night: Holloway vs. Rodríguez	November 13, 2021	2	1:35	Las Vegas, Nevada, United States	
Win	17–4	Andre Ewell	TKO (punches)	UFC on ESPN: Sandhagen vs. Dillashaw	July 24, 2021	2	3:45	Las Vegas, Nevada, United States	Return to Bantamweight.
Loss	16–4	Hakeem Dawodu	Decision (split)	UFC 244	November 2, 2019	3	5:00	New York City, New York, United States	
Win	16–3	Julian Erosa	KO (head kick)	UFC Fight Night: dos Anjos vs. Lee	May 18, 2019	3	1:49	Rochester, New York, United States	
Loss	15–3	Sheymon Moraes	Decision (split)	UFC 230	November 3, 2018	3	5:00	New York City, New York, United States	
Win	15–2	Daniel Teymur	Submission (rear-naked choke)	UFC Fight Night: Rivera vs. Moraes	June 1, 2018	3	2:55	Utica, New York, United States	
Win	14–2	Dan Ige	Decision (unanimous)	UFC 220	January 20, 2018	3	5:00	Boston, Massachusetts, United States	
Win	13–2	Peter Petties	TKO (punches)	Dana White's Contender Series 5	August 8, 2017	2	2:39	Las Vegas, Nevada, United States	
Win	12–2	Tim Dooling	Decision (unanimous)	Ring of Combat 59	June 2, 2017	3	5:00	Atlantic City, New Jersey, United States	Defended the Ring of Combat Featherweight Championship.
Win	11–2	Frank Buenafuente	Submission (rear-naked choke)	Ring of Combat 58	February 24, 2017	2	3:59	Atlantic City, New Jersey, United States	Defended the Ring of Combat Featherweight Championship.
Win	10–2	Frank Buenafuente	Decision (unanimous)	Ring of Combat 57	November 18, 2016	3	5:00	Atlantic City, New Jersey, United States	Won the Ring of Combat Featherweight Championship.
Win	9–2	Francisco Isata	Submission (rear-naked choke)	Cage Fury FC 60	August 6, 2016	2	3:16	Atlantic City, New Jersey, United States	Featherweight debut.
Loss	8–2	Brian Kelleher	Submission (guillotine choke)	Ring of Combat 54	March 4, 2016	3	0:18	Atlantic City, New Jersey, United States	For the Ring of Combat Bantamweight Championship.
Loss	8–1	Brian Kelleher	Decision (majority)	Ring of Combat 52	September 25, 2015	3	5:00	Atlantic City, New Jersey, United States	Lost the Ring of Combat Bantamweight Championship.
Win	8–0	Michael Imperato	Decision (unanimous)	Ring of Combat 51	June 5, 2015	3	5:00	Atlantic City, New Jersey, United States	Defended the Ring of Combat Bantamweight Championship.
Win	7–0	Thomas Vasquez	TKO (punches)	Ring of Combat 50	January 23, 2015	3	3:46	Atlantic City, New Jersey, United States	Defended the Ring of Combat Bantamweight Championship.
Win	6–0	Jake Grigson	Submission (rear-naked choke)	Ring of Combat 49	September 19, 2014	1	2:20	Atlantic City, New Jersey, United States	Defended the Ring of Combat Bantamweight Championship.
Win	5–0	Jason McLean	Decision (unanimous)	Ring of Combat 47	January 24, 2014	3	5:00	Atlantic City, New Jersey, United States	Won the Ring of Combat Bantamweight Championship.
Win	4–0	Corey Simmons	Submission (rear-naked hoke)	Ring of Combat 46	September 20, 2013	2	3:49	Atlantic City, New Jersey, United States	
Win	3–0	Dennis Dombrow	Decision (unanimous)	Ring of Combat 45	June 14, 2013	3	5:00	Atlantic City, New Jersey, United States	
Win	2–0	Umaer Haq	Decision (unanimous)	Xtreme Caged Combat: Backlash	November 2, 2012	3	5:00	Philadelphia, Pennsylvania, United States	
Win	1–0	Kenneth Nagle	KO (punches)	Matrix Fights 6	July 13, 2012	1	1:46	Philadelphia, Pennsylvania, United States	Bantamweight debut.

== See also ==
- List of male mixed martial artists
