= PFL 4 (2021) =

Professional Fighters League mixed martial arts event in 2021

- The poster for PFL 4
- Promotion: Professional Fighters League
- Date: June 10, 2021
- Venue: Ocean Casino Resort
- City: Atlantic City, New Jersey, United States

Event chronology
PFL 3	PFL 4	PFL 5

The PFL 4 mixed martial arts event for the 2021 season of the Professional Fighters League was held on June 10, 2021. This was the fourth regular season event of the tournament and included fights in the Featherweight and Lightweight divisions.

== Background ==
The event was to be headlined by a lightweight clash between the former UFC and WEC Lightweight champion Anthony Pettis and undefeated Alexander Martinez. However, Pettis withdrew due to illness and Martinez instead faced Natan Schulte. Schulte's opponent Raush Manfio - who replaced an injured Mikhail Odintsov- will now face Pettis at PFL 6 on June 25, 2021.

In the co-main event, the 2011 NCAA Division I champion Bubba Jenkins was to face Anthony Dizy. However, Dizy withdrew and Jenkins instead faced Bobby Moffett.

Boxing champion and Olympic gold medalist Claressa Shields made MMA debut on the main card of this event against Brittney Elkin.

Dana White's Contender Series alumni Brendan Loughnane faced The Ultimate Fighter 27 contestant Tyler Diamond to round out the main card.

Lazar Stojadinovic was supposed to face Lance Palmer, but it was announced he would not compete at PFL 4. Palmer was then scheduled to face Jesse Stirn. However, Palmer and Movlid Khaybulaev were later scratched from their bouts and rebooked to face each other at PFL 6. Their original opponents, Jesse Stirn and Sheymon Moraes, faced each other at this event instead.

At weigh-ins, Joilton Lutterbach and Jesse Stirn weighed in at 159.4 and 146.8 pounds, missing weight by 3.4 and .8 pounds respectively. They were fined 30 and 20 percent respectively of their purses, deemed ineligible to win playoff points, given a walkover loss, and were penalized one point in the standings. Their opponents Clay Collard and Sheymon Moraes received a walkover win regardless of bout outcome but are eligible to gain stoppage points.

== Results ==
Main Card (ESPN 2/ESPN+)
Weight class				Method	Round	Time	Notes
Women's Lightweight	Claressa Shields	def.	Brittney Elkin	TKO (punches)	3	1:44
Lightweight	Clay Collard	def.	Joilton Lutterbach	Decision (split) (29-28, 28-29, 29-28)	3	5:00
Featherweight	Bubba Jenkins	def.	Bobby Moffett	Decision (unanimous) (29-28, 29-28, 29-28)	3	5:00
Featherweight	Brendan Loughnane	def.	Tyler Diamond	Decision (majority) (30-27, 29-27, 28-28)	3	5:00
Preliminary card (ESPN+)
Lightweight	Natan Schulte	def.	Alexander Martinez	Decision (split) (28-29, 29-28, 29-28)	3	5:00
Lightweight	Olivier Aubin-Mercier	def.	Marcin Held	Decision (unanimous) (30-27, 30-27, 30-27)	3	5:00
Lightweight	Loik Radzhabov	def.	Akhmet Aliev	TKO (punches)	1	0:27
Featherweight	Sheymon Moraes	def.	Jesse Stirn	Submission (kimura)	2	4:59
Featherweight	Chris Wade	def.	Arman Ospanov	KO (head kick and punches)	2	2:18

== Standings After Event ==
The PFL points system is based on results of the match. The winner of a fight receives 3 points. If the fight ends in a draw, both fighters will receive 1 point. The bonus for winning a fight in the first, second, or third round is 3 points, 2 points, and 1 point respectively. The bonus for winning in the third round requires a fight be stopped before 4:59 of the third round. No bonus point will be awarded if a fighter wins via decision. For example, if a fighter wins a fight in the first round, then the fighter will receive 6 total points. A decision win will result in three total points. If a fighter misses weight, the opponent (should they comply with weight limits) will receive 3 points due to a walkover victory, regardless of winning or losing the bout; if the non-offending fighter subsequently wins with a stoppage, all bonus points will be awarded.

=== Lightweight ===
Fighter	Wins	Draws	Losses	1st	2nd	3rd	Total Points (Note: The four fighters with most points advance to the playoffs)
♛ Clay Collard	2	0	0	0	0	0	6
♛ Loik Radzhabov	1	0	1	1	0	0	6
Raush Manfio	1	0	0	0	0	0	3
Alexander Martinez	1	0	1	0	0	0	3
Natan Schulte	1	0	1	0	0	0	3
Marcin Held	1	0	1	0	0	0	3
Akhmet Aliev	1	0	1	0	0	0	3
E Olivier Aubin-Mercier	1	0	0	0	0	0	2
Anthony Pettis	0	0	1	0	0	0	0
E oilton Lutterbach	0	0	2	0	0	0	-1

=== Featherweight ===
Fighter	Wins	Draws	Losses	1st	2nd	3rd	Total Points (Note: The four fighters with most points advance to the playoffs)
♛ Brendan Loughnane	2	0	0	1	0	0	9
♛Chris Wade	2	0	0	0	1	0	8
♛ Bubba Jenkins	2	0	0	0	0	0	6
Sheymon Moraes	1	0	1	0	1	0	5
Movlid Khaybulaev	1	0	0	0	0	0	3
E Tyler Diamond	1	0	1	0	0	0	3
Lance Palmer	0	0	1	0	0	0	0
E Bobby Moffett	0	0	1	0	0	0	0
E Arman Ospanov	0	0	1	0	0	0	0
E Jesse Stirn	0	0	1	0	0	0	-1

♛ = Clinched playoff spot --- E = Eliminated

== See also ==
- List of PFL events
- List of current PFL fighters
