= UFC 220 =

UFC mixed martial arts event in 2018

UFC 220: Miocic vs. Ngannou
- The poster for UFC 220: Miocic vs. Ngannou
- Promotion: Ultimate Fighting Championship
- Date: January 20, 2018
- Venue: TD Garden
- City: Boston, Massachusetts
- Attendance: 16,015
- Total gate: $2,450,000
- Buyrate: 350,000

Event chronology
UFC Fight Night: Stephens vs. Choi	UFC 220: Miocic vs. Ngannou	UFC on Fox: Jacaré vs. Brunson 2

UFC 220: Miocic vs. Ngannou was a mixed martial arts event produced by the Ultimate Fighting Championship that was held on January 20, 2018, at TD Garden in Boston, Massachusetts.

== Background ==
A UFC Heavyweight Championship bout between current champion Stipe Miocic and Francis Ngannou served as the event headliner.

The event also featured a UFC Light Heavyweight Championship bout between current champion Daniel Cormier and Volkan Oezdemir.

A welterweight bout between The Ultimate Fighter: American Top Team vs. Blackzilians welterweight winner Kamaru Usman and Emil Weber Meek was originally scheduled for UFC 219. However, due to an alleged visa issue for Meek which affected his travel schedule, the pairing was delayed and then rescheduled for this event. However, it was shifted to UFC Fight Night: Stephens vs. Choi a day later, which took place six days before this event.

A welterweight bout between Abdul Razak Alhassan and Sabah Homasi was originally scheduled for UFC 219, but later shifted to this event. The pairing met previously at UFC 218, when Alhassan won via a controversial TKO.

Charles Rosa was expected to face promotional newcomer Dan Ige at the event. However, on December 22, Rosa pulled out due to a neck injury. Ige remained on the card and faced fellow newcomer Julio Arce.

Arnold Allen was expected to face The Ultimate Fighter: Latin America 2 lightweight winner Enrique Barzola at the event. However, Allen was pulled from the fight on January 11 due to alleged visa issues which restricted his ability to travel. He was replaced by promotional newcomer Matt Bessette.

Jamie Moyle was expected to face Maryna Moroz at the event. However, Moyle pulled out of the fight during the week leading up to the event citing an undisclosed injury. In turn, promotion officials indicated that Moroz would be rescheduled for a future event.

== Results ==
Main Card
Weight class				Method	Round	Time	Notes
Heavyweight	Stipe Miocic (c)	def.	Francis Ngannou	Decision (unanimous) (50–44, 50–44, 50–44)	5	5:00	(Note: For the UFC Heavyweight Championship.)
Light Heavyweight	Daniel Cormier (c)	def.	Volkan Oezdemir	TKO (punches)	2	2:00	(Note: For the UFC Light Heavyweight Championship.)
Featherweight	Calvin Kattar	def.	Shane Burgos	TKO (punches)	3	0:32
Light Heavyweight	Gian Villante	def.	Francimar Barroso	Decision (split) (30–27, 28–29, 30–27)	3	5:00
Bantamweight	Rob Font	def.	Thomas Almeida	TKO (head kick and punches)	2	2:24
Preliminary Card (Fox Sports 1)
Featherweight	Kyle Bochniak	def.	Brandon Davis	Decision (unanimous) (29–28, 29–28, 30–27)	3	5:00
Welterweight	Abdul Razak Alhassan	def.	Sabah Homasi	KO (punch)	1	3:47
Flyweight	Dustin Ortiz	def.	Alexandre Pantoja	Decision (unanimous) (29–28, 29–28, 29–28)	3	5:00
Featherweight	Julio Arce	def.	Dan Ige	Decision (unanimous) (30–27, 30–27, 29–28)	3	5:00
Preliminary Card (UFC Fight Pass)
Featherweight	Enrique Barzola	def.	Matt Bessette	Decision (unanimous) (30–27, 29–28, 29–28)	3	5:00
Lightweight	Islam Makhachev	def.	Gleison Tibau	KO (punch)	1	0:57

== Bonus awards ==
The following fighters were awarded $50,000 bonuses:

- Fight of the Night: Calvin Kattar vs. Shane Burgos
- Performance of the Night: Daniel Cormier and Abdul Razak Alhassan

== Reported payout ==
The following is the reported payout to the fighters as reported to the Massachusetts Office of Consumer Affairs and Business Regulation. It does not include sponsor money and also does not include the UFC's traditional "fight night" bonuses. The total disclosed payout for the event was $2,551,000.

- Stipe Miocic: $600,000 (no win bonus) def. Francis Ngannou: $500,000
- Daniel Cormier: $500,000 (no win bonus) def. Volkan Oezdemir: $350,000
- Calvin Kattar: $28,000 (includes $14,000 win bonus) def. Shane Burgos: $22,000
- Gian Villante: $100,000 (includes $50,000 win bonus) def. Francimar Barroso: $27,000
- Rob Font: $60,000 (includes $30,000 win bonus) def. Thomas Almeida: $36,000
- Kyle Bochniak: $24,000 (includes $12,000 win bonus) def. Brandon Davis: $10,000
- Abdul Razak Alhassan: $40,000 (includes $20,000 win bonus) def. Sabah Homasi: $12,000
- Dustin Ortiz: $60,000 (includes $30,000 win bonus) def. Alexandre Pantoja: $14,000
- Julio Arce: $20,000 (includes $10,000 win bonus) def. Dan Ige: $10,000
- Enrique Barzola: $42,000 (includes $21,000 win bonus) def. Matt Bessette: $12,000
- Islam Makhachev: $32,000 (includes $16,000 win bonus) def. Gleison Tibau: $50,000

== See also ==
- List of UFC events
- List of current UFC fighters
- 2018 in UFC
