= UFC 219 =

UFC mixed martial arts event in 2017

UFC 219: Cyborg vs. Holm
- The poster for UFC 219: Cyborg vs. Holm
- Promotion: Ultimate Fighting Championship
- Date: December 30, 2017
- Venue: T-Mobile Arena
- City: Paradise, Nevada
- Attendance: 13,561
- Total gate: $1,760,628.74
- Buyrate: 380,000

Event chronology
UFC on Fox: Lawler vs. dos Anjos	UFC 219: Cyborg vs. Holm	UFC Fight Night: Stephens vs. Choi

UFC 219: Cyborg vs. Holm was a mixed martial arts event produced by the Ultimate Fighting Championship held on December 30, 2017, at the T-Mobile Arena in Paradise, Nevada, part of the Las Vegas metropolitan area.

== Background ==
A UFC Women's Featherweight Championship bout between current champion Cris Cyborg (who is also a former Strikeforce Women's Featherweight Champion and Invicta FC Featherweight Champion) and former UFC Women's Bantamweight Champion Holly Holm headlined this event.

Former WEC Bantamweight Champion and two-time UFC Bantamweight Champion Dominick Cruz was scheduled to face Jimmie Rivera at the event. However, Cruz was removed from the card on November 8 after breaking his arm. On November 21, John Lineker was secured as a replacement opponent for Rivera. On December 24, Lineker pulled out of the fight due to a tooth infection that required emergency surgery. After a matchup with former WSOF Bantamweight Champion Marlon Moraes failed to materialize, Rivera was pulled from the event.

Gökhan Saki was scheduled to face Khalil Rountree Jr. at the event. However, Saki was removed from the card on November 28 after sustaining a knee injury. Subsequently, promotional newcomer Michał Oleksiejczuk was secured as his replacement.

A welterweight bout between The Ultimate Fighter: American Top Team vs. Blackzilians welterweight winner Kamaru Usman and Emil Weber Meek was expected to take place at this event. However, due to an alleged visa issue for Meek, the pairing was delayed and rescheduled to take place three weeks later at UFC 220.

A welterweight bout between Abdul Razak Alhassan and Sabah Homasi was originally scheduled for this event, but later shifted to UFC 220. The pairing met previously at UFC 218, when Alhassan won via a controversial TKO.

== Results ==
Main Card
Weight class				Method	Round	Time	Notes
Women's Featherweight	Cris Cyborg (c)	def.	Holly Holm	Decision (unanimous) (49–46, 48–47, 48–47)	5	5:00	(Note: For the UFC Women's Featherweight Championship.)
Lightweight	Khabib Nurmagomedov	def.	Edson Barboza	Decision (unanimous) (30–25, 30–25, 30–24)	3	5:00	(Note: UFC lightweight title eliminator)
Lightweight	Dan Hooker	def.	Marc Diakiese	Submission (guillotine choke)	3	0:42
Women's Strawweight	Carla Esparza	def.	Cynthia Calvillo	Decision (unanimous) (29–28, 29–28, 29–28)	3	5:00
Welterweight	Neil Magny	def.	Carlos Condit	Decision (unanimous) (30–27, 30–27, 29–28)	3	5:00
Preliminary Card (Fox Sports 1)
Light Heavyweight	Michał Oleksiejczuk	vs.	Khalil Rountree Jr.	No Contest (overturned)	3	5:00	(Note: Originally a unanimous decision (30–27, 30–27, 30–27) win for Oleksiejczuk; overturned after he tested positive for clomiphene.)
Featherweight	Myles Jury	def.	Ricky Glenn	Decision (unanimous) (30–27, 30–27, 30–27)	3	5:00
Middleweight	Marvin Vettori	vs.	Omari Akhmedov	Draw (majority) (28–28, 29–28, 28–28)	3	5:00
Flyweight	Matheus Nicolau	def.	Louis Smolka	Decision (unanimous) (30–26, 30–26, 30–25)	3	5:00
Preliminary Card (UFC Fight Pass)
Bantamweight	Tim Elliott	def.	Mark De La Rosa	Submission (anaconda choke)	2	1:41

== Bonus awards ==
The following fighters were awarded $50,000 bonuses:

- Fight of the Night: Cris Cyborg vs. Holly Holm
- Performance of the Night: Khabib Nurmagomedov and Tim Elliott

== Reported payout ==
The following is the reported payout to the fighters as reported to the Nevada State Athletic Commission. It does not include sponsor money and also does not include the UFC's traditional "fight night" bonuses. The total disclosed payout for the event was $1,795,000.

- Cris Cyborg: $500,000 (no win bonus) def. Holly Holm: $300,000
- Khabib Nurmagomedov: $160,000 (includes $80,000 win bonus) def. Edson Barboza: $75,000
- Dan Hooker: $48,000 (includes $24,000 win bonus) def. Marc Diakiese: $24,000
- Carla Esparza: $72,000 (includes $36,000 win bonus) def. Cynthia Calvillo: $41,000
- Neil Magny: $140,000 (includes $70,000 win bonus) def. Carlos Condit: $115,000
- Michał Oleksiejczuk: $24,000 (includes $12,000 win bonus) vs. Khalil Rountree Jr.: $19,000
- Myles Jury: $66,000 (includes $33,000 win bonus) def. Rick Glenn: $22,000
- Marvin Vettori: $32,000 drew with Omari Akhmedov: $29,000
- Matheus Nicolau: $28,000 (includes $14,000 win bonus) def. Louis Smolka: $32,000
- Tim Elliott: $56,000 (includes $28,000 win bonus) def. Mark De La Rosa: $12,000

== Aftermath ==
On January 17, it was announced that Calvillo tested positive for marijuana metabolites, stemming from an in-competition sample collected in conjunction with the event.

On January 25, Oleksiejczuk was notified by USADA due to a potential Anti-Doping Policy violation stemming from an in-competition sample collected in conjunction with this event. On June 12, it was announced that he was suspended for one year by USADA. He was already suspended one year in March by the NSAC and his win over Rountree Jr. was overturned to a no contest. The suspensions will run concurrently.

This was the final event refereed by "Big" John McCarthy, who was with the promotion since the second event. His final match refereed was the co-main event between Khabib Nurmagomedov vs Edson Barboza.

== See also ==
- List of UFC events
- 2017 in UFC
- List of current UFC fighters
