= PFL 8 (2019) =

Professional Fighters League mixed martial arts event in 2019

- The poster for PFL 8
- Promotion: Professional Fighters League
- Date: October 17, 2019
- Venue: Mandalay Bay Events Center
- City: Las Vegas, Nevada

Event chronology
| PFL 7 | PFL 8 | PFL 9 |

The PFL 8 mixed martial arts event for the 2019 season of the Professional Fighters League was held on October 17, 2019, at the Mandalay Bay Events Center in Las Vegas, Nevada.

== Background ==
The event was the eighth of the 2019 season and marked the start of the playoffs for the Featherweight and Lightweight divisions.

== Results ==
Main card (ESPN+)
| Weight class | | | | Method | Round | Time | Notes |
|---|---|---|---|---|---|---|---|
| Lightweight | Loik Radzhabov | def. | Chris Wade | Decision (unanimous) (30-27, 30-27, 30-27) | 3 | 5:00 | (Note: Semi-final round bout of the 2019 PFL Lightweight playoffs.) |
| Lightweight | Natan Schulte | def. | Akhmet Aliev | Submission (arm triangle choke) | 2 | 2:26 | (Note: Semi-final round bout of the 2019 PFL Lightweight playoffs.) |
| Featherweight | Daniel Pineda | def. | Jeremy Kennedy | Submission (guillotine choke) | 1 | 4:00 | (Note: Semi-final round bout of the 2019 PFL Featherweight playoffs.) |
| Lightweight | Chris Wade | def. | Nate Andrews | Decision (majority) (19-19, 20-18, 20-18) | 2 | 5:00 | (Note: Quarterfinal round bout of the 2019 PFL Lightweight playoffs.) |
| Lightweight | Islam Mamedov | vs. | Loik Radzhabov | Draw (majority) | 2 | 5:00 | (Note: Quarterfinal round bout of the 2019 PFL Lightweight playoffs.) |
| Lightweight | Akhmet Aliev | def. | Rashid Magomedov | Decision (unanimous) (20-18, 20-18, 20-18 | 2 | 5:00 | (Note: Quarterfinal round bout of the 2019 PFL Lightweight playoffs.) |
Preliminary card (ESPN2)
| Featherweight | Lance Palmer | def. | Alex Gilpin | Decision (unanimous) (30-27, 30-27, 30-27) | 3 | 5:00 | (Note: Semi-final round bout of the 2019 PFL Featherweight playoffs.) |
| Lightweight | Natan Schulte | def. | Ramsey Nijem | Submission (rear-naked choke) | 1 | 0:52 | (Note: Quarterfinal round bout of the 2019 PFL Lightweight playoffs.) |
| Featherweight | Jeremy Kennedy | def. | Luis Rafael Laurentino | TKO (punches) | 2 | 1:24 | (Note: Quarterfinal round bout of the 2019 PFL Featherweight playoffs.) |
| Featherweight | Daniel Pineda | def. | Movlid Khaybulaev | TKO (punches) | 1 | 0:29 | (Note: Quarterfinal round bout of the 2019 PFL Featherweight playoffs.) |
| Featherweight | Alex Gilpin | def. | Andre Harrison | Technical submission (ninja front choke) | 2 | 1:49 | (Note: Quarterfinal round bout of the 2019 PFL Featherweight playoffs.) |
| Featherweight | Lance Palmer | def. | Alexandre de Almeida | Decision (unanimous) (20-17, 20-18, 20-18) | 2 | 5:00 | (Note: Quarterfinal round bout of the 2019 PFL Featherweight playoffs.) |

== 2019 PFL Featherweight playoffs ==
Quarterfinals
1 | (United States) Lance Palmer | UD 2
9 | (Brazil) Alexandre de Almeida | L
4 | (United States) Alex Gilpin | SUB 2
5 | (United States) Andre Harrison | L
2 | (Russia) Movlid Khaybulaev | L
7 | (United States) Daniel Pineda | KO 1
3 | (Brazil) Luis Rafael Laurentino | L
6 | (Canada) Jeremy Kennedy | TKO 2

Semifinals
1 | (United States) Lance Palmer | UD 3
4 | (United States) Alex Gilpin | L
7 | (United States) Daniel Pineda | SUB 1
6 | (Canada) Jeremy Kennedy | L

Finals
1 | (United States) Lance Palmer | UD 5
4 | (United States) Alex Gilpin | L

*Daniel Pineda was originally scheduled to face Lance Palmer but was forced to pull out of the bout after failing NAC drug test. He was replaced by Alex Gilpin.

Legend
| (SD) | (Split Decision) |
| (UD) | (Unanimous Decision) |
| (MD) | (Majority Decision) |
| SUB | Submission |
| (T)KO | (Technical) Knock Out |
| L | Loss |

== 2019 PFL Lightweight playoffs ==
Quarterfinals
1 | (Brazil) Natan Schulte | SUB 1
8 | (United States) Ramsey Nijem | L
4 | (Russia) Akhmet Aliev | UD 2
5 | (Russia) Rashid Magomedov | L
2 | (Russia) Islam Mamedov | L
7 | (Tajikistan) Loik Radzhabov | Draw 2
3 | (United States) Chris Wade | MD 2
6 | (United States) Nate Andrews | L

Semifinals
1 | (Brazil) Natan Schulte | SUB 2
4 | (Russia) Akhmet Aliev | L
7 | (Tajikistan) Loik Radzhabov | UD 3
3 | (United States) Chris Wade | L

Finals
1 | (Brazil) Natan Schulte | UD 5
7 | (Tajikistan) Loik Radzhabov | L

Legend
| (SD) | (Split Decision) |
| (UD) | (Unanimous Decision) |
| (MD) | (Majority Decision) |
| SUB | Submission |
| (T)KO | (Technical) Knock Out |
| L | Loss |

== See also ==
- List of PFL events
- List of current PFL fighters
