= PFL 5 (2019) =

Professional Fighters League MMA event in 2019

- The poster for PFL 5
- Promotion: Professional Fighters League
- Date: July 25, 2019
- Venue: Ocean Resort Casino
- City: Atlantic City, New Jersey

Event chronology
PFL 4	PFL 5	PFL 6

The PFL 5 mixed martial arts event for the 2019 season of the Professional Fighters League was held on July 25, 2019, at the Ocean Resort Casino in Atlantic City, New Jersey. This was the fifth regular season event of 2019 and include fights in the featherweight and lightweight divisions.

== Background ==
Several bouts were changed due to three fighters - lightweights Ramsey Nijem and Carlao Silva and featherweight Gadzhi Rabadanov - missing their weight marks for their respective bouts with all three removed from the card. As a result, defending lightweight champion Natan Schulte, Nijem's original opponent, instead faced Jesse Ronson, Silva's original opponent. Daniel Pineda, Rabadanov's opponent, was awarded three points for a walkover victory.

== Results ==
Main card (ESPN2)
Weight class				Method	Round	Time	Notes
Lightweight	Chris Wade	def.	Akhmet Aliev	Decision (unanimous) (29–28, 29–28, 29–28)	3	5:00
Featherweight	Lance Palmer	def.	Luis Rafael Laurentino	TKO (punches)	3	2:45
Lightweight	Nate Andrews	def.	Rashid Magomedov	Decision (unanimous) (29–28, 29–28, 29–28)	3	5:00
Featherweight	Alex Gilpin	def.	Freddy Assunção	Technical submission (guillotine choke)	1	2:08
Featherweight	Jeremy Kennedy	def.	Steven Siler	Decision (unanimous) (30–27, 29–28, 29–28)	3	5:00
Preliminary card (ESPN+)
Lightweight	Natan Schulte	def.	Jesse Ronson	Decision (unanimous) (30–27, 30–27, 30–27)	3	5:00
Featherweight	Andre Harrison	vs.	Movlid Khaybulaev	Draw (majority) (29–28, 28–28, 28–28)	3	5:00
Lightweight	Islam Mamedov	def.	Yincang Bao	TKO (punches)	1	3:32
Featherweight	Alexandre de Almeida	def.	Peter Petties	Decision (unanimous) (29–28, 29–28, 29–28)	3	5:00
Lightweight	Loik Radzhabov	def.	Ylies Djiroun	Decision (split) (28-29, 29–28, 30–27)	3	5:00

== Standings after event ==
The point system consists of outcome based scoring and bonuses for an early win. Under the outcome based scoring system, the winner of a fight receives 3 points and the loser receives 0 points. If the fight ends in a draw, both fighters will receive 1 point. The bonus for winning a fight in the first, second, or third round is 3 points, 2 points, and 1 point respectively. For example, if a fighter wins a fight in the first round, then the fighter will receive 6 total points. If a fighter misses weight, then the fighter that missed weight will receive 0 points and his opponent will receive 3 points due to a walkover victory.

=== Featherweight ===
Fighter	Wins	Draws	Losses	1st	2nd	3rd	Total Points
♛ Lance Palmer	2	0	0	0	0	0	7
♛ Movlid Khaybulaev	1	1	0	1	0	0	7
♛ Luis Rafael Laurentino	1	0	1	1	0	0	6
♛ Alex Gilpin	1	0	1	1	0	0	6
♛ Andre Harrison	1	1	0	0	0	0	4
♛Jeremy Kennedy	1	0	1	0	0	0	3
♛ Daniel Pineda	1	0	0	0	0	0	3
♛ Gadzhi Rabadanov	1	0	1	0	0	0	3
E Alexandre de Almeida	1	0	1	0	0	0	3
E Freddy Assunção	0	0	1	0	0	0	0
E Steven Siler	0	0	2	0	0	0	0
E Peter Petties	0	0	2	0	0	0	0

=== Lightweight ===
Fighter	Wins	Draws	Losses	1st	2nd	3rd	Total Points
♛ Natan Schulte	2	0	0	1	0	0	9
♛ Islam Mamedov	2	0	0	1	0	0	9
♛ Chris Wade	2	0	0	0	0	0	6
♛ Akhmet Aliev	1	0	1	1	0	0	6
♛ Rashid Magomedov	1	0	0	0	0	0	3
♛ Nate Andrews	1	0	1	0	0	0	3
♛ Loik Radzhabov	1	0	1	0	0	0	3
♛ Ramsey Nijem	1	0	1	0	0	0	3
E Ylies Djiroun	0	0	2	0	0	0	0
E Yincang Bao	0	0	2	0	0	0	0
E Jesse Ronson	0	0	1	0	0	0	0
E Carlos Silva	0	0	2	0	0	0	0

♛ = Clinched playoff spot --- E = Eliminated

== See also ==
- List of PFL events
- List of current PFL fighters
