= Lance Palmer =

American wrestler and mixed martial artist

- Born: February 7, 1987 (age 39); Columbia Station, Ohio, U.S.
- Other names: The Party
- Height: 5 ft 6 in (1.68 m)
- Weight: 145 lb (66 kg; 10.4 st)
- Division: Featherweight
- Reach: 69 in (180 cm)
- Style: Wrestling
- Fighting out of: Toms River, New Jersey, U.S.
- Team: Team Alpha Male (2010–2017); Xtreme Couture (2018–2019); Nick Catone MMA (2019–present)
- Rank: Black belt in Brazilian jiu-jitsu under Dustin Akbari
- Wrestling: NCAA Division I Wrestling
- Years active: 2011–present

Mixed martial arts record
- Total: 31
- Wins: 23
- By knockout: 1
- By submission: 8
- By decision: 14
- Losses: 8
- By knockout: 2
- By submission: 1
- By decision: 5

Other information
- University: Ohio State University
- Mixed martial arts record from Sherdog

Lance Palmer (born February 7, 1987) is an American professional mixed martial artist who currently competes in the featherweight division. A professional since 2011, he is most notable for competing in Professional Fighters League (PFL), where he was the 2018 and 2019 tournament champion.

He currently wrestles for Real American Freestyle (RAF), where he also serves as their head of talent development. As a collegiate wrestler, Palmer was a four-time NCAA Division I All-American and four-time OHSAA state champion. He is a member of the Ohio State Athletics Hall of Fame.

== Wrestling career ==
=== High school ===
Palmer started wrestling at the age of nine and won every OHSAA (state) tournament since his freshman year of high school, making him a four-time Ohio champion out of St. Edward High School in Lakewood, Ohio. He graduated with a record of 150-6 and also won a NHSCA Senior National championship while coached by Greg Urbas.

=== College ===
After graduating, he attended Division I Ohio State University, where he competed at 149 pounds in all of his 4 seasons.

==== 2006-07 ====
True Freshman: Earned All-American status after placing fourth at the NCAA tournament, becoming the second Buckeye to do so in their first year of competition. He also placed third at the Big Ten Championships, and defeated 3 ranked opponents at the tournament.

==== 2007-08 ====
Sophomore: Became a two-time All-American placing eight at the NCAA championship. At the Big Ten's, he placed sixth and was the fifth seed.

==== 2008-09 ====
Junior: Placed fourth at the NCAA's, making him a three-time All-American. He also placed third at the Big Ten Conference championship.

==== 2009-10 ====
Senior: Palmer had the most success in his college career as he became the NCAA's tournament runner-up and champion of the Big Ten Conference before graduating.

Over his career, Palmer compiled a 121–33 record and became a four-time NCAA Division I All-American, one-time NCAA finalist and one-time Big Ten Champion. He defeated notable opponents such as future Olympic Gold Medalist and 2x NCAA Champion Jordan Burroughs, NCAA Champion and future Olympian Frank Molinaro, future NCAA Champion and MMA Fighter Bubba Jenkins, former NCAA Champion (later two-time) Brent Metcalf and University Freestyle National Champion Jason Chamberlain

On June 16, 2020, Palmer was inducted into the Ohio State Athletics Hall of Fame for his legendary collegiate wrestling career.

=== Real American Freestyle ===
Palmer began competing for Real American Freestyle (RAF) in 2025, where he is also their head of talent development.

He competed at RAF 01 on August 30, 2025, losing to Austin Gomez.

Palmer then competed at RAF 05 on January 11, 2026, losing to Arman Tsarukyan by 10-0 Technical Fall.

He defeated Cayden Henschel by 3-2 decision at RAF 08 on April 18, 2026.

Palmer faced Aaron Pico at RAF 10 on June 13, 2026. He lost by 12-1 Technical Fall.

== Mixed martial arts career ==
=== Early career ===
Palmer made his professional mixed martial arts debut on May 20, 2011. He began his career at 7-0 and won the Resurrection Fighting Alliance Featherweight Championship a little over two years after his debut.

=== World Series of Fighting ===
On December 7, 2013, Palmer made his World Series of Fighting debut at WSOF 7 against Bellator veteran Georgi Karakhanyan for the inaugural WSOF Featherweight Championship. He lost via guillotine choke in the third round.

On June 21, 2014, Palmer faced Nick LoBasco at WSOF 10. He won via rear naked choke submission in the first round.

On December 13, 2014, Palmer challenged Rick Glenn for the WSOF Featherweight Championship at WSOF 16. He won via rear naked choke submission in the third round to become the WSOF Featherweight Champion.

On June 5, 2015, Palmer made his first defense of the WSOF Featherweight Championship at WSOF 21 against IFL and WEC veteran Chris Horodecki. He won via neck crank submission in the first round to retain the WSOF Featherweight Championship.

On December 18, 2015, Palmer made the second defense of the WSOF Featherweight Championship at WSOF 26 against Alexandre Almeida. He lost via unanimous decision.

On May 10, 2016, it was announced that Palmer will have a rematch against Alexandre Almeida for the WSOF Featherweight Championship at WSOF 32 on July 30, 2016 in the co-main event. He won via unanimous decision to become a two time WSOF Featherweight Champion.

On June 30, 2016, Palmer fought Andre Harrison in for the first title defense of his second reign as champion at WSOF 35 in the co-main event. He lost the fight via unanimous decision.

=== Professional Fighters League ===
After World Series of Fighting became the Professional Fighters League, Palmer next fought on November 2, 2017. He fought Steven Siler at Professional Fighters League: Fight Night where Palmer won the fight via unanimous decision.

Palmer then competed in the inaugural season of the Professional Fighters League. He fought on at the first event of the new format at PFL 1 in the Featherweight division. On June 7, 2018, he faced Bekbulat Magomedov and won the fight by second round submission. On July 19, 2018, Palmer fought Jumabieke Tuerxun at PFL 4. He won the fight by third round submission.

In the fall of 2018, Palmer entered the PFL Featherweight tournament as the second seed. At PFL 8 on October 5, 2018, he defeated Max Coga by unanimous decision in the quarterfinal round and then rematched Andre Harrison and earned unanimous decision win in the semifinal round.

Palmer fought another rematch against Steven Siler in the finals at PFL 11 on December 31, 2018. He won the fight via unanimous decision, winning the PFL Featherweight tournament and earning the $1 million cash prize.

==== 2019 Season ====
In the opening round of the second season of PFL, Palmer faced Alex Gilpin at PFL 2 on May 23, 2019. He won the fight via unanimous decision, collecting three regular season points.

In the second round Palmer faced Luis Rafael Laurentino at PFL 5 on July 25, 2019. He won the fight via third-round TKO and advanced to the playoffs.

Palmer next faced Alexandre de Almeida and Alex Gilpin at PFL 8 on October 17, 2019. He won both fights by unanimous decision. He was expected to face Daniel Pineda in the Featherweight tournament finals, but after Pineda failed a drug test after PFL 8, Palmer was set to face Alex Gilpin in the finals again.

Palmer and Gilpin faced each other for the third time during the season at PFL 10 on December 31, 2019. Palmer implemented his grappling-heavy fight style, winning the bout via unanimous decision and claiming his second PFL Featherweight tournament victory.

==== 2021 Season ====
Palmer was scheduled to face Jason Soares in the opening round of the third season on May 21, 2020. However, the event was cancelled due to the COVID-19 pandemic.

Palmer faced 2011 NCAA Division I champion Bubba Jenkins on April 23, 2021 at PFL 1. He lost for the first time during his PFL run via unanimous decision.

Palmer was scheduled to face Lazar Stojadinovic at PFL 4 on June 10, 2021. However, on May 24, it was announced that Stojadinovic had to pull out of the bout and was replaced by Jesse Stirn. A day before the event, Palmer was pulled and rescheduled to face Movlid Khaybulaev on June 25, 2021 at PFL 6. He lost the bout via unanimous decision, eliminating Palmer from the playoffs for the first time in his PFL career.

==== 2022 Season ====
Palmer faced Chris Wade on April 28, 2022 at PFL 2. He lost the bout via unanimous decision.

Palmer faced Sheymon Moraes on June 24, 2022 at PFL 5. He won the bout via unanimous decision.

=== Absolute Championship Akhmat ===
Palmer was scheduled to take part in the 2023 ACA Featherweight Grand Prix, facing Bibert Tumenov in the quarter-finals on August 11, 2023 at ACA 161. However, Palmer withdrew from the fight due to injury and the bout was postponed for the following event on September 2, 2023 at ACA 162. At weigh-ins, Palmer (148 lbs / 67.1 kg) missed weight and was fined a 30% of his purse with went to his opponent. He subsequently lost the bout via knockout at the end of the first round.

Moving up to Lightweight, Palmer faced Alexey Polpudnikov on May 17, 2024 at ACA 175: Gordeev vs. Damkovskiy, losing by TKO stoppage in the second round.

==== Global Fight League ====
On December 11, 2024, it was announced that Palmer was signed by Global Fight League. However, in April 2025, it was reported that all GFL events were cancelled indefinitely.

== Submission grappling career ==
Palmer competed against Richie Lewis in the main event of Pit Submission Series 11 on January 24, 2025. Palmer lost the match by unanimous decision.

== Personal life ==
Palmer was an assistant wrestling coach at the Virginia Tech program.

Palmer’s high school career was documented in the movie "Pinned."

Palmer and his fiancée Jessie have a daughter, Maya (born 2021).

== Championships and accomplishments ==
=== Mixed Martial Arts ===
- Professional Fighters League
  - 2018 PFL Featherweight Championship
  - 2019 PFL Featherweight Championship
- Resurrection Fighting Alliance
  - RFA Featherweight Championship (One time)
- World Series of Fighting
  - WSOF Featherweight Championship (Two times)
  - One Successful Title Defense

=== Folkstyle Wrestling ===
==== Collegiate ====
- National Collegiate Athletic Association
  - Ohio State Athletics Hall of Fame Inductee (2020)
  - NCAA Division I All-American out of Ohio State University (2007, 2008, 2009, 2010)
  - NCAA Division I 149 lbs - 4th place out of Ohio State University (2007)
  - NCAA Division I 149 lbs - 8th place out of Ohio State University (2008)
  - NCAA Division I 149 lbs - 4th place out of Ohio State University (2009)
  - NCAA Division I 149 lbs - 2nd place out of Ohio State University (2010)
- Big Ten Conference
  - B1G 149 lbs - 3rd place out of Ohio State University (2007)
  - B1G 149 lbs - 6th place out of Ohio State University (2008)
  - B1G 149 lbs - 3rd place out of Ohio State University (2009)
  - B1G 149 lbs - 1st place out of Ohio State University (2010)

==== High school ====
- Ohio High School Athletic Association
  - OHSAA 103 lb Division I State Champion out of St. Edward High School (2003)
  - OHSAA 112 lb Division I State Champion out of St. Edward High School (2004)
  - OHSAA 125 lb Division I State Champion out of St. Edward High School (2005)
  - OHSAA 140 lb Division I State Champion out of St. Edward High School (2006)

== Mixed martial arts record ==
Professional record breakdown
31 matches	23 wins	8 losses
By knockout	1	2
By submission	8	1
By decision	14	5

Res.	Record	Opponent	Method	Event	Date	Round	Time	Location	Notes
Loss	23–8	Alexey Polpudnikov	TKO (punches)	ACA 175	May 17, 2024	2	1:55	Moscow, Russia	Lightweight debut.
Loss	23–7	Bibert Tumenov	KO (punches)	ACA 162	September 2, 2023	1	4:53	Krasnodar, Russia	2023 ACA Featherweight Grand Prix Quarterfinal; Palmer missed weight (148 lb).
Win	23–6	Sheymon Moraes	Decision (unanimous)	PFL 5 (2022)	June 24, 2022	3	5:00	Atlanta, Georgia, United States	
Loss	22–6	Chris Wade	Decision (unanimous)	PFL 2 (2022)	April 28, 2022	3	5:00	Arlington, Texas, United States	
Loss	22–5	Movlid Khaybulaev	Decision (unanimous)	PFL 6 (2021)	June 25, 2021	3	5:00	Atlantic City, New Jersey, United States	
Loss	22–4	Bubba Jenkins	Decision (unanimous)	PFL 1 (2021)	April 23, 2021	3	5:00	Atlantic City, New Jersey, United States	
Win	22–3	Alex Gilpin	Decision (unanimous)	PFL 10 (2019)	December 31, 2019	5	5:00	New York City, New York, United States	Won the 2019 PFL Featherweight Tournament.
Win	21–3	Alex Gilpin	Decision (unanimous)	PFL 8 (2019)	October 17, 2019	3	5:00	Las Vegas, Nevada, United States	2019 PFL Featherweight Tournament Semifinal.
Win	20–3	Alexandre Almeida	Decision (unanimous)	PFL 8 (2019)	October 17, 2019	2	5:00	Las Vegas, Nevada, United States	2019 PFL Featherweight Tournament Quarterfinal.
Win	19–3	Luis Rafael Laurentino	TKO (punches)	PFL 5 (2019)	July 25, 2019	3	2:45	Atlantic City, New Jersey, United States	
Win	18–3	Alex Gilpin	Decision (unanimous)	PFL 2 (2019)	May 23, 2019	3	5:00	Uniondale, New York, United States	
Win	17–3	Steven Siler	Decision (unanimous)	PFL 11 (2018)	December 31, 2018	5	5:00	New York City, New York, United States	Won the 2018 PFL Featherweight Tournament.
Win	16–3	Andre Harrison	Decision (unanimous)	PFL 8 (2018)	October 5, 2018	3	5:00	New Orleans, Louisiana, United States	2018 PFL Featherweight Tournament Semifinal.
Win	15–3	Max Coga	Decision (unanimous)	PFL 8 (2018)	October 5, 2018	2	5:00	New Orleans, Louisiana, United States	2018 PFL Featherweight Tournament Quarterfinal.
Win	14–3	Jumabieke Tuerxun	Submission (rear-naked choke)	PFL 4 (2018)	July 19, 2018	3	4:34	Uniondale, New York, United States	
Win	13–3	Bekbulat Magomedov	Submission (rear-naked choke)	PFL 1 (2018)	June 7, 2018	2	3:21	New York City, New York, United States	
Win	12–3	Steven Siler	Decision (unanimous)	PFL Fight Night	November 2, 2017	3	5:00	Washington, D.C., United States	
Loss	11–3	Andre Harrison	Decision (unanimous)	WSOF 35	March 18, 2017	5	5:00	Verona, New York, United States	Lost the WSOF Featherweight Championship.
Win	11–2	Alexandre Almeida	Decision (majority)	WSOF 32	July 30, 2016	5	5:00	Everett, Washington, United States	Won the WSOF Featherweight Championship.
Loss	10–2	Alexandre Almeida	Decision (unanimous)	WSOF 26	December 18, 2015	5	5:00	Las Vegas, Nevada, United States	Lost the WSOF Featherweight Championship.
Win	10–1	Chris Horodecki	Submission (neck crank)	WSOF 21	June 5, 2015	1	4:28	Edmonton, Alberta, Canada	Defended the WSOF Featherweight Championship.
Win	9–1	Rick Glenn	Submission (rear naked choke)	WSOF 16	December 13, 2014	3	3:09	Sacramento, California, United States	Won the WSOF Featherweight Championship.
Win	8–1	Nick LoBosco	Submission (rear naked choke)	WSOF 10	June 21, 2014	1	4:15	Las Vegas, Nevada, United States	
Loss	7–1	Georgi Karakhanyan	Submission (guillotine choke)	WSOF 7	December 7, 2013	3	4:40	Vancouver, British Columbia, Canada	For the inaugural WSOF Featherweight Championship.
Win	7–0	Jared Downing	Decision (split)	RFA 8	June 21, 2013	5	5:00	Milwaukee, Wisconsin, United States	Won the RFA Featherweight Championship.
Win	6–0	Patrick Reeves	Submission (guillotine choke)	Showdown Fights 11	May 10, 2013	1	3:40	Orem, Utah, United States	
Win	5–0	Fredson Paixao	Decision (split)	RFA 4	November 2, 2012	3	5:00	Las Vegas, Nevada, United States	
Win	4–0	Joe Washington	Decision (unanimous)	Ultimate Victory Challenge 20	August 4, 2012	3	5:00	Columbus, Ohio, United States	
Win	3–0	Jordan Chandler	Submission (arm triangle choke)	Showdown Fights 6	February 24, 2012	2	4:07	Orem, Utah, United States	
Win	2–0	Chris David	Decision (unanimous)	Fight For Wrestling 4	October 1, 2011	3	5:00	San Luis Obispo, California, United States	
Win	1–0	Emilio Gonzales	Submission (rear naked choke)	Fight For Wrestling 3	May 11, 2011	1	2:22	Bakersfield, California, United States	Featherweight debut.

== NCAA record ==
NCAA Championships Matches
Res.	Record	Opponent	Score	Date	Event
2010 NCAA Championships (silver) at 149 lbs
Loss	15-7	Brent Metcalf	2-3	March 20, 2010	2010 NCAA Division I Wrestling Championships
Win	15-6	Frank Molinaro	2-0	March 20, 2010	2010 NCAA Division I Wrestling Championships
Win	14-6	Jason Chamberlain	Fall	March 20, 2010	2010 NCAA Division I Wrestling Championships
Win	13-6	Nick Bertucci	Fall	March 20, 2010	2010 NCAA Division I Wrestling Championships
Win	12-6	Seth Morton	8-1	March 20, 2010	2010 NCAA Division I Wrestling Championships
2009 NCAA Championships 4th at 149 lbs
Win	11-6	Jake Patacsil	8-7	March 21, 2009	2009 NCAA Division I Wrestling Championships
Loss	10-5	Brent Metcalf	2-6	March 21, 2009	2009 NCAA Division I Wrestling Championships
Win	10-4	Kyle Ruschell	4-0	March 21, 2009	2009 NCAA Division I Wrestling Championships
Win	9-4	Mitch Mueller	3-0	March 21, 2009	2009 NCAA Division I Wrestling Championships
Win	8-4	Matt Cathell	4-3	March 21, 2009	2009 NCAA Division I Wrestling Championships
2008 NCAA Championships 8th at 149 lbs
Loss	7-4	Dustin Schlatter	2-3	March 22, 2008	2008 NCAA Division I Wrestling Championships
Loss	7-3	Josh Churella	2-6	March 22, 2008	2008 NCAA Division I Wrestling Championships
Win	7-2	Brandon Carter	MD 11-3	March 22, 2008	2008 NCAA Division I Wrestling Championships
Loss	6-2	Brent Metcalf	2-3	March 22, 2008	2008 NCAA Division I Wrestling Championships
Win	6-1	Jake Patacsil	MD 14-6	March 22, 2008	2008 NCAA Division I Wrestling Championships
Win	5-1	Kyle Larson	MD 14-3	March 22, 2008	2008 NCAA Division I Wrestling Championships
2007 NCAA Championships 4th at 149 lbs
Win	4-1	Tyler Turner	OT 6-5	March 17, 2007	2007 NCAA Division I Wrestling Championships
Loss	3-1	Josh Churella	2-5	March 17, 2007	2007 NCAA Division I Wrestling Championships
Win	3-0	Matt Coughlin	2-1	March 17, 2007	2007 NCAA Division I Wrestling Championships
Win	2-0	Scott Ervin	10-3	March 17, 2007	2007 NCAA Division I Wrestling Championships
Win	1-0	John Cox	MD 10-2	March 17, 2007	2007 NCAA Division I Wrestling Championships

== See also ==
- List of male mixed martial artists
