= PFL 2 (2022) =

Professional Fighters League MMA event in 2022

- The poster for PFL 2
- Promotion: Professional Fighters League
- Date: April 28, 2022
- Venue: Esports Stadium Arlington
- City: Arlington, Texas

Event chronology
PFL 1	PFL 2	PFL 3

The PFL 2 mixed martial arts event for the 2022 season of the Professional Fighters League was held on April 28, 2022, at the Esports Stadium Arlington in Arlington, Texas. This was the second regular season event of the tournament and included fights in the Heavyweight and Featherweight divisions.

== Background ==
The event was headlined by a heavyweight bout between the 2021 champion Bruno Cappelozza and UK regional veteran Stuart Austin. The co-main featured a featherweight bout between Brendan Loughnane and Shooto veteran Ryoji Kudo.

The remaining two fights of the main card saw heavyweight finalist Ante Delija face off against Matheus Scheffel, while the Renan Ferreira faced off against Jamelle Jones.

Bubba Jenkins was scheduled to face Sung Bin Jo at this event. However, after Jo Sungbin pulled out of the bout, he was replaced by Kyle Bochniak.

A heavyweight bout between Ali Isaev and Klidson Abreu was scheduled for the event. However, Isaev pulled out of the bout and was replaced by the Week 6 winner of the PFL Challenger Series, Adam Keresh.

A heavyweight bout between Denis Goltsov and Sam Kei was scheduled for this event. However, Kei would later pull out of the bout and was replaced by Cody Goodale.

== Results ==
Main Card (ESPN 2)
Weight class				Method	Round	Time	Notes
Heavyweight	Bruno Cappelozza	def.	Stuart Austin	TKO (punches)	1	4:24
Featherweight	Chris Wade	def.	Lance Palmer	Decision (unanimous) (30–27, 30–27, 29–28)	3	5:00
Featherweight	Brendan Loughnane	def.	Ryoji Kudo	Technical Decision (unanimous) (29–28, 29–28, 29–28)	3	3:00	(Note: Fight was stopped by the doctor after an accidental clash of heads opened a cut on Kudo and rendered him unable to continue.)
Heavyweight	Renan Ferreira	def.	Jamelle Jones	KO (front kick and punches)	1	0:25
Heavyweight	Denis Goltsov	def.	Cody Goodale	TKO (punches)	1	3:20
Preliminary card (ESPN+)
Heavyweight	Ante Delija	def.	Matheus Scheffel	TKO (punches)	2	0:59
Featherweight	Bubba Jenkins	def.	Kyle Bochniak	Decision (unanimous) (29–28, 29–28, 29–28)	3	5:00
Heavyweight	Klidson Abreu	def.	Adam Keresh	Decision (unanimous) (29–28, 30–27, 30–27)	3	5:00
Featherweight	Sheymon Moraes	def.	Boston Salmon	Decision (unanimous) (30–27, 30–27, 30–27)	3	5:00
Featherweight	Alejandro Flores	def.	Saba Bolaghi	Decision (unanimous) (30–27, 30–27, 29–28)	3	5:00

== Standings After Event ==
The PFL points system is based on results of the match. The winner of a fight receives 3 points. If the fight ends in a draw, both fighters will receive 1 point. The bonus for winning a fight in the first, second, or third round is 3 points, 2 points, and 1 point respectively. The bonus for winning in the third round requires a fight be stopped before 4:59 of the third round. No bonus point will be awarded if a fighter wins via decision. For example, if a fighter wins a fight in the first round, then the fighter will receive 6 total points. A decision win will result in three total points. If a fighter misses weight, the opponent (should they comply with weight limits) will receive 3 points due to a walkover victory, regardless of winning or losing the bout; if the non-offending fighter subsequently wins with a stoppage, all bonus points will be awarded.

=== Heavyweight ===
Fighter	Wins	Draws	Losses	1st	2nd	3rd	Total Points (Note: The four fighters with most points advance to the playoffs)
Renan Ferreira	1	0	0	1	0	0	6
Denis Goltsov	1	0	0	1	0	0	6
Bruno Cappelozza	1	0	0	1	0	0	6
Ante Delija	1	0	0	0	1	0	5
Klidson Abreu	1	0	0	0	0	0	3
Adam Keresh	0	0	1	0	0	0	0
Matheus Scheffel	0	0	1	0	0	0	0
Stuart Austin	0	0	1	0	0	0	0
Cody Goodale	0	0	1	0	0	0	0
Jamelle Jones	0	0	1	0	0	0	0

=== Featherweight ===
Fighter	Wins	Draws	Losses	1st	2nd	3rd	Total Points (Note: The four fighters with most points advance to the playoffs)
Sheymon Moraes	1	0	0	0	0	0	3
Alejandro Flores	1	0	0	0	0	0	3
Chris Wade	1	0	0	0	0	0	3
Bubba Jenkins	1	0	0	0	0	0	3
Brendan Loughnane	1	0	0	0	0	0	3
Ryoji Kudo	0	0	1	0	0	0	0
Kyle Bochniak	0	0	1	0	0	0	0
Lance Palmer	0	0	1	0	0	0	0
Saba Bolaghi	0	0	1	0	0	0	0
Boston Salmon	0	0	1	0	0	0	0

== See also ==
- List of PFL events
- List of current PFL fighters
