= Sheymon Moraes =

Brazilian mixed martial artist

- Born: Sheymon da Silva Moraes; October 11, 1990 (age 36); Niterói, Rio de Janeiro, Brazil
- Height: 5 ft 8 in (1.73 m)
- Weight: 145 lb (66 kg; 10 st 5 lb)
- Division: Featherweight; Bantamweight
- Reach: 72 in (183 cm)
- Fighting out of: Los Angeles, California United States
- Team: Black House (2011–present)
- Rank: Blue belt in Brazilian Jiu-Jitsu; Purple belt in Judo; Brown belt in kickboxing
- Years active: 2012–present

Mixed martial arts record
- Total: 24
- Wins: 17
- By knockout: 7
- By submission: 1
- By decision: 9
- Losses: 7
- By knockout: 2
- By submission: 2
- By decision: 3

Other information
- Mixed martial arts record from Sherdog

Sheymon da Silva Moraes (born October 11, 1990) is a Brazilian mixed martial artist (MMA) who competes in the Featherweight division. A professional mixed martial artist since 2012, Moraes has also competed in the UFC and Professional Fighters League (PFL).

== Background ==
Born in Niterói, Rio de Janeiro, Brazil, Moraes trained and competed in judo from his early childhood to the age of 12. After walking away from the sport, he started training Brazilian jiu-jitsu, Muay Thai and kickboxing for fun. Eventually he started competing in Muay Thai which led him to mixed martial arts.

== Mixed martial arts career ==
=== Early career ===
Moraes started his professional MMA career in 2012. Racking up a record of 6–0 in his native Brazilian circuit, Moraes signed a four-fight contract with World Series of Fighting. He amassed a record of 3–1 in the organization, challenging Marlon Moraes for the WSOF Bantamweight Championship but losing in the effort.

=== Ultimate Fighting Championship ===
He joined UFC after settling a two-year contract dispute with World Series of Fighting.

Moraes made his UFC debut on November 25, 2017 against Zabit Magomedsharipov at UFC Fight Night: Bisping vs. Gastelum. He lost the fight via a submission.

His next fight came on August 4, 2018 at UFC 227 against Matt Sayles. He won the fight in a unanimous decision.

Moraes faced Julio Arce on November 3, 2018 at UFC 230. He won the fight via split decision.

Moraes faced Sodiq Yusuff on March 30, 2019 at UFC on ESPN 2. He lost the fight via unanimous decision.

Moraes faced Andre Fili on July 13, 2019 at UFC Fight Night 155. He lost the fight via knockout in round one and was subsequently released from the promotion.

=== Professional Fighters League ===
On October 6, 2020, news surfaced that Moraes had signed with the Professional Fighters League.

==== 2021 season ====
Moraes made his PFL debut against Brendan Loughnane on April 23, 2021 at PFL 1. He lost the bout via KO in the first round.

Moraes was scheduled to face Movlid Khaybulaev at PFL 4 on June 10, 2021. A day before the event, Movlid was pulled and Moraes was rescheduled to face Jesse Stirn. He won the bout via a kimura submission at the end of the second round.

Moraes faced Lazar Stojadinovic on August 27, 2021 at PFL 9. He won the fight via TKO in the second round.

==== 2022 season ====
Moraes faced Boston Salmon on April 28, 2022 at PFL 2. He won the bout via unanimous decision.

Moraes faced Lance Palmer on June 24, 2022 at PFL 5. He lost the bout via unanimous decision.

Moraes rematched Marlon Moraes, replacing the injured Shane Burgos on November 25, 2022, at PFL 10. He won the bout in the third round via TKO stoppage.

=== Post PFL ===
Moraes returned after a two year layoff to face fellow UFC vet T.J. Brown on August 30, 2024 at United Fight League 5, defeating him via unanimous decision.

== Championships and accomplishments ==
=== Kickboxing / Muay Thai ===
- Brazilian Kickboxing Champion (Three times)
- Muay Thai Brazilian Champion (Two times)

== Mixed martial arts record ==
Professional record breakdown
24 matches	17 wins	7 losses
By knockout	7	2
By submission	1	2
By decision	9	3

Res.	Record	Opponent	Method	Event	Date	Round	Time	Location	Notes
Win	17–7	Andre Harrison	Decision (split)	Victory Fighting League: Clash of the Champions	October 24, 2025	5	5:00	New York City, New York, United States	Won the inaugural VFL Lightweight Championship.
Loss	16–7	Julio Arce	Decision (unanimous)	Victory Fighting League: Battle of the Burroughs	August 15, 2025	3	5:00	New York City, New York, United States	Featherweight bout.
Win	16–6	T.J. Brown	Decision (unanimous)	United Fight League 5	August 30, 2024	3	5:00	Chandler, Arizona, United States	Lightweight debut.
Win	15–6	Marlon Moraes	TKO (punches)	PFL 10 (2022)	November 25, 2022	3	0:58	New York City, New York, United States	
Loss	14–6	Lance Palmer	Decision (unanimous)	PFL 5 (2022)	June 24, 2022	3	5:00	Atlanta, Georgia, United States	
Win	14–5	Boston Salmon	Decision (unanimous)	PFL 2 (2022)	April 28, 2022	3	5:00	Arlington, Texas, United States	
Win	13–5	Lazar Stojadinovic	TKO (punches)	PFL 9 (2021)	August 27, 2021	2	4:45	Hollywood, Florida, United States	
Win	12–5	Jesse Stirn	Submission (kimura)	PFL 4 (2021)	June 10, 2021	2	4:59	Atlantic City, New Jersey, United States	Catchweight (146.8 lb) bout; Stirn missed weight.
Loss	11–5	Brendan Loughnane	KO (punches)	PFL 1 (2021)	April 23, 2021	1	2:55	Atlantic City, New Jersey, United States	
Loss	11–4	Andre Fili	KO (punches)	UFC Fight Night: de Randamie vs. Ladd	July 13, 2019	1	3:07	Sacramento, California, United States	
Loss	11–3	Sodiq Yusuff	Decision (unanimous)	UFC on ESPN: Barboza vs. Gaethje	March 30, 2019	3	5:00	Philadelphia, Pennsylvania, United States	
Win	11–2	Julio Arce	Decision (split)	UFC 230	November 3, 2018	3	5:00	New York City, New York, United States	
Win	10–2	Matt Sayles	Decision (unanimous)	UFC 227	August 4, 2018	3	5:00	Los Angeles, California, United States	
Loss	9–2	Zabit Magomedsharipov	Submission (anaconda choke)	UFC Fight Night: Bisping vs. Gastelum	November 25, 2017	3	4:30	Shanghai, China	
Win	9–1	Luis Palomino	Decision (unanimous)	WSOF 31	June 17, 2016	3	5:00	Mashantucket, Connecticut, United States	
Win	8–1	Robbie Peralta	TKO (punches)	WSOF 26	December 18, 2015	2	3:21	Las Vegas, Nevada, United States	Featherweight debut.
Loss	7–1	Marlon Moraes	Submission (rear-naked choke)	WSOF 22	August 1, 2015	3	3:46	Las Vegas, Nevada, United States	For the WSOF Bantamweight Championship.
Win	7–0	Gabriel Solorio	Decision (split)	WSOF 16	December 13, 2014	3	5:00	Sacramento, California, United States	
Win	6–0	Felipe Alves	KO (elbow)	Nitrix Champion Fight 20	April 12, 2014	1	0:20	Blumenau, Brazil	
Win	5–0	Eliel dos Santos e Santos	Decision (split)	Team Nogueira: MMA Circuit 1	December 22, 2012	3	5:00	Rio de Janeiro, Brazil	
Win	4–0	Pedro Nobre	TKO (punches)	Bitetti Combat 12	September 8, 2012	2	4:16	Rio de Janeiro, Brazil	
Win	3–0	Pedro Arruda	TKO (knees to the body)	Bitetti Combat 12	September 8, 2012	1	2:33	Rio de Janeiro, Brazil	
Win	2–0	Jefferson Silva dos Santos	TKO (elbows)	Mortal Kombat 1	April 20, 2012	2	2:48	Rio de Janeiro, Brazil	
Win	1–0	Richard Medeiros	Decision (unanimous)	Max Fight 11	March 17, 2012	3	5:00	São Paulo, Brazil	Bantamweight debut.

== See also ==
- List of male mixed martial artists
