= 2022 in Professional Fighters League =

- Genre: Sports
- Country of origin: United States

Original release
- Network: ESPN
- Release: April 20 – November 25, 2022

This is a list of events and standings for the Professional Fighters League, a mixed martial arts organization based in the United States, for the 2022 season. In Greece the national champion was Euagelos Gianakidis and the second best was Kapetanios Apostolos and last Nikolaos Vagianidis. The biggest upset though, it was Kapetanios from a small village called Assiros

== 2022 (defending) world champions ==
Division	Upper weight limit	Champion	Date
Heavyweight	265 lb (120 kg; 18.9 st)	Ante Delija	November 25, 2022 (PFL 10)
Light Heavyweight	205 lb (93 kg; 14.6 st)	Rob Wilkinson	November 25, 2022 (PFL 10)
Welterweight	170 lb (77 kg; 12 st)	Sadibou Sy	November 25, 2022 (PFL 10)
Men's Lightweight	155 lb (70 kg; 11.1 st)	Olivier Aubin-Mercier	November 25, 2022 (PFL 10)
Women's Lightweight	155 lb (70 kg; 11.1 st)	Larissa Pacheco	November 25, 2022 (PFL 10)
Featherweight	145 lb (66 kg; 10.5 st)	Brendan Loughnane	November 25, 2022 (PFL 10)

== PFL Challenger Series ==
PFL Challenger Series is an American mixed martial arts promotion. Young and up-and-coming male and female MMA prospects will compete for a slot in the PFL tournament season and a chance at $1 million. Each week, the PFL Challenger Series will consist of a celebrity guest panel featuring personalities in film, athletics, and music. The PFL Challenger Series will debut on fuboTV. The eight events streamed on consecutive Friday nights starting Feb. 18 until April 8. It also aired on its linear network, Fubo Sports Network.

2022 Contract Winners:

- HW: Adam Keresh
- LHW: Bruce Souto, Simeon Powell was signed to a development league contract
- WW: Jarrah Al Silawa, Chris Mixan was signed to a development league contract
- LW: Bruno Miranda, Alexei Pergande was signed to a development league contract
- W LW: Martina Jindrová
- FW: Boston Salmon

== Events ==
As part of a new multi-year deal with ESPN, the first event of the 2022 PFL season will kick off on April 20, 2022. The new deal includes “expanded media rights,” with the entirety of the PFL's 2022 playoffs, as well as the “majority of regular season events” to simulcast on ESPN and ESPN+. Additional event coverage will also be featured on ESPN2.

#	Event	Date	Venue	Location
10	PFL 10	November 25, 2022	Hulu Theater	New York City, New York, U.S.
9	PFL 9	August 20, 2022	Copper Box Arena	London, England
8	PFL 8	August 13, 2022	Cardiff Motorpoint Arena	Cardiff, Wales
7	PFL 7	August 5, 2022	Hulu Theater	New York City, New York, United States
6	PFL 6	July 1, 2022	Overtime Elite Arena	Atlanta, Georgia, United States
5	PFL 5	June 24, 2022	Overtime Elite Arena	Atlanta, Georgia, United States
4	PFL 4	June 17, 2022	Overtime Elite Arena	Atlanta, Georgia, United States
3	PFL 3	May 6, 2022	Esports Stadium Arlington	Arlington, Texas, United States
2	PFL 2	April 28, 2022	Esports Stadium Arlington	Arlington, Texas, United States
1	PFL 1	April 20, 2022	Esports Stadium Arlington	Arlington, Texas, United States

== Playoffs ==
=== 2022 PFL Heavyweight playoffs ===
Semifinals
2	(Croatia) Ante Delija	TKO
3	(Brazil) Renan Ferreira	1
6	(United States) Juan Adams*	3
7	(Brazil) Matheus Scheffel*	TKO

Finals
2	(Croatia) Ante Delija	TKO
7	(Brazil) Matheus Scheffel	1

- Bruno Cappelozza was originally scheduled to face Denis Goltsov but was unable to continue in the tournament. He was replaced by #7 ranked Matheus Scheffel.
- Denis Goltsov was originally scheduled to face Matheus Scheffel but was unable to continue in the tournament. He was replaced by #6 ranked Juan Adams.

Legend
(SD)	(Split Decision)
(UD)	(Unanimous Decision)
(MD)	(Majority Decision)
SUB	Submission
(T)KO	(Technical) Knock Out
L	Loss

=== 2022 PFL Light Heavyweight playoffs ===
Semifinals
1	(Australia) Rob Wilkinson	TKO
4	(Brazil) Delan Monte	1
2	(Russia) Omari Akhmedov	UD
5	(United States) Josh Silveira	3

Finals
1	(Australia) Rob Wilkinson	TKO
2	(Russia) Omari Akhmedov	2

- Antônio Carlos Júnior was originally scheduled to face Omari Akhmedov but was unable to continue in the tournament. He was replaced by #5 ranked Josh Silveira.

Legend
(SD)	(Split Decision)
(UD)	(Unanimous Decision)
(MD)	(Majority Decision)
SUB	Submission
(T)KO	(Technical) Knock Out
L	Loss

=== 2022 PFL Welterweight playoffs ===
Semifinals
1	(Canada) Rory MacDonald	1
7	(United States) Dilano Taylor*	TKO
2	(Sweden) Sadibou Sy	DEC
3	(Brazil) Carlos Leal	3

Finals
2	(Sweden) Sadibou Sy	UD
7	(United States) Dilano Taylor	5

- Magomed Umalatov was originally scheduled to face Rory MacDonald but was unable to continue in the tournament. He was replaced by #7 ranked Dilano Taylor.

Legend
(SD)	(Split Decision)
(UD)	(Unanimous Decision)
(MD)	(Majority Decision)
SUB	Submission
(T)KO	(Technical) Knock Out
L	Loss

=== 2022 PFL Lightweight playoffs ===
Semifinals
1	(United States) Anthony Pettis	3
4	(Scotland) Stevie Ray	UD
2	(Canada) Olivier Aubin-Mercier	UD
3	(Paraguay) Alex Martinez	3

Finals
4	(Scotland) Stevie Ray	2
2	(Canada) Olivier Aubin-Mercier	KO

Legend
(SD)	(Split Decision)
(UD)	(Unanimous Decision)
(MD)	(Majority Decision)
SUB	Submission
(T)KO	(Technical) Knock Out
L	Loss

=== 2022 PFL Women's Lightweight playoffs ===
Semifinals
1	(Brazil) Larissa Pacheco	TKO
4	(Ukraine) Olena Kolesnyk	1
2	(United States) Kayla Harrison	SUB
3	(Czech Republic) Martina Jindrová	1

Finals
1	(Brazil) Larissa Pacheco	DEC
2	(United States) Kayla Harrison	5

Legend
(SD)	(Split Decision)
(UD)	(Unanimous Decision)
(MD)	(Majority Decision)
SUB	Submission
(T)KO	(Technical) Knock Out
L	Loss

=== 2022 PFL Featherweight playoffs ===
Semifinals
1	(United States) Chris Wade	3
4	(England) Brendan Loughnane	DEC
2	(Japan) Ryoji Kudo	1
3	(United States) Bubba Jenkins	SUB

Finals
4	(England) Brendan Loughnane	TKO
3	(United States) Bubba Jenkins	4

Legend
(SD)	(Split Decision)
(UD)	(Unanimous Decision)
(MD)	(Majority Decision)
SUB	Submission
(T)KO	(Technical) Knock Out
L	Loss

== Standings ==
The PFL points system is based on results of the match. The winner of a fight receives 3 points. If the fight ends in a draw, both fighters will receive 1 point. A no-contest will be scored as a draw. The bonus for winning a fight in the first, second, or third round is 3 points, 2 points, and 1 point respectively. The bonus for winning in the third round requires a fight be stopped before 4:59 of the third round. No bonus point will be awarded if a fighter wins via decision. For example, if a fighter wins a fight in the first round, then the fighter will receive 6 total points. A decision win will result in three total points. If a fighter misses weight, the opponent (should they comply with weight limits) will receive 3 points due to a walkover victory, regardless of winning or losing the bout, with the fighter who missed weight being deducted 1 standings point; if the non-offending fighter subsequently wins with a stoppage, all bonus points will be awarded. A fighter who was unable to compete for any reason, will receive a 1-point penalty (-1 point in the standings). The fighters who made weight will not receive a walkover, but will earn points and contracted purse amounts based on their performance in the altered matchup.

=== Heavyweight ===
Fighter	Wins	Draws	Losses	1st	2nd	3rd	Total Points (Note: The four fighters with most points advance to the playoffs)
(Russia) Denis Goltsov	2	0	0	1	0	0	9
(Croatia) Ante Delija	2	0	0	0	1	0	8
(Brazil) Renan Ferreira	1	0	1	1	0	0	6
(Brazil) Bruno Cappelozza	1	0	1	1	0	0	6
(Brazil) Klidson Abreu	2	0	0	0	0	0	6
(United States) Juan Adams	1	0	0	0	1	0	5
(Brazil) Matheus Scheffel	1	0	1	0	0	0	3
(Tonga) Sam Kei	0	0	1	0	0	0	0
(United States) Shelton Graves	0	0	1	0	0	0	0
(United States) Maurice Greene	0	0	1	0	0	0	0
(Israel) Adam Keresh	0	0	1	0	0	0	0
(United States) Cody Goodale	0	0	1	0	0	0	0
(United States) Jamelle Jones	0	0	1	0	0	0	0
(England) Stuart Austin	0	0	1	0	0	0	0

=== Light Heavyweight ===
Fighter	Wins	Draws	Losses	1st	2nd	3rd	Total Points (Note: The four fighters with most points advance to the playoffs)
(Australia) Rob Wilkinson	2	0	0	1	1	0	11
(Russia) Omari Akhmedov	2	0	0	1	1	0	11
(Brazil) Antônio Carlos Júnior	2	0	0	1	0	0	9
(Brazil) Delan Monte	1	0	1	1	0	0	6
(United States) Josh Silveira	1	0	0	1	0	0	6
(United States) Cory Hendricks	1	0	0	0	1	0	5
(Norway) Marthin Hamlet	1	0	1	0	0	0	3
(Brazil) Bruce Souto	0	0	2	0	0	0	0
(Lithuania) Teodoras Aukštuolis	0	0	2	0	0	0	0
(Argentina) Emiliano Sordi	0	0	2	0	0	0	0
(Czech Republic) Viktor Pešta	0	0	2	0	0	0	0

=== Welterweight ===
Fighter	Wins	Draws	Losses	1st	2nd	3rd	Total Points (Note: The four fighters with most points advance to the playoffs)
(Canada) Rory MacDonald	1	0	1	1	0	0	6
(Sweden) Sadibou Sy	2	0	0	0	0	0	6
(Brazil) Carlos Leal	1	0	0	0	0	0	6
(Russia) Magomed Umalatov	1	0	0	1	0	0	6
(Russia) Magomed Magomedkerimov	1	0	0	0	1	0	5
(United States) Ray Cooper III	1	0	1	1	0	0	5
(United States) Dilano Taylor	1	0	1	0	0	0	3
(Jordan) Jarrah Al Silawi	1	0	1	0	0	0	3
(United States) Brett Cooper	0	0	1	0	0	0	0
(Russia) Nikolai Aleksakhin	0	0	1	0	0	0	0
(Brazil) Gleison Tibau	0	0	1	0	0	0	0
(Brazil) João Zeferino	0	0	1	0	0	0	-1

=== Lightweight ===
Fighter	Wins	Draws	Losses	1st	2nd	3rd	Total Points (Note: The four fighters with most points advance to the playoffs)
(United States) Anthony Pettis	1	0	1	1	0	0	6
(Canada) Olivier Aubin-Mercier	2	0	0	0	0	0	6
(Paraguay) Alex Martinez	2	0	0	0	0	0	6
(Scotland) Stevie Ray	1	0	1	0	1	0	5
(Brazil) Raush Manfio	1	0	1	0	0	1	4
(Brazil) Natan Schulte	1	0	1	0	0	0	3
(United States) Clay Collard	1	0	1	0	0	0	3
(United States) Jeremy Stephens	1	0	1	0	0	0	3
(Republic of Ireland) Myles Price	0	0	2	0	0	0	0
(Poland) Marcin Held	0	0	1	0	0	0	0
(South Africa) Don Madge	0	0	1	0	0	0	0

=== Women's Lightweight ===
Fighter	Wins	Draws	Losses	1st	2nd	3rd	Total Points (Note: The four fighters with most points advance to the playoffs)
(Brazil) Larissa Pacheco	2	0	0	2	0	0	12
(United States) Kayla Harrison	2	0	0	1	0	0	9
(Czech Republic) Martina Jindrová	2	0	0	1	0	0	9
(Ukraine) Olena Kolesnyk	2	0	0	0	0	0	6
(Russia) Marina Mokhnatkina	1	0	1	0	0	0	3
(Canada) Julia Budd	0	0	1	0	0	0	3
(Mexico) Abigail Montes	0	0	2	0	0	0	0
(Brazil) Vanessa Melo	0	0	2	0	0	0	0
(Kazakhstan) Zamzagul Fayzallanova	0	0	2	0	0	0	0
(United States) Kaitlin Young	0	0	1	0	0	0	0
(New Zealand) Genah Fabian	1	0	1	0	0	0	-1

=== Featherweight ===
Fighter	Wins	Draws	Losses	1st	2nd	3rd	Total Points (Note: The four fighters with most points advance to the playoffs)
(United States) Chris Wade	2	0	0	0	0	0	9
(Japan) Ryoji Kudo	1	0	1	1	0	0	6
(United States) Bubba Jenkins	2	0	0	0	0	0	6
(England) Brendan Loughnane	1	0	0	0	0	0	6
(Brazil) Sheymon Moraes	1	0	1	0	0	0	3
(United States) Lance Palmer	1	0	1	0	0	0	3
(Mexico) Alejandro Flores	1	0	1	0	0	0	3
(United States) Kyle Bochniak	0	0	2	0	0	0	0
(Bosnia and Herzegovina) Ago Huskić	0	0	1	0	0	0	0
(Brazil) Reinaldo Ekson	0	0	1	0	0	0	0
(United States) Boston Salmon	0	0	1	0	0	0	0
(Germany) Saba Bolaghi	0	0	1	0	0	0	0

== Broadcast ==
On January 26, 2022, it was announced that PFL had extended their broadcast deal with ESPN. The contract extension included the seven events planned for the 2022 season, which would be broadcast on the main ESPN channel and simulcast on ESPN+.

The 2022 PFL season will be broadcast by RMC Sport in France. Both the 2022 PFL season and the inagurual PFL Challenger Series will be broadcast by Channel 4 in the United Kingdom and Ireland.

== See also ==
- List of PFL events
- List of current PFL fighters
- 2022 in UFC
- 2022 in Bellator MMA
- 2022 in ONE Championship
- 2022 in Absolute Championship Akhmat
- 2022 in Konfrontacja Sztuk Walki
- 2022 in Rizin Fighting Federation
- 2022 in LUX Fight League
- 2022 in AMC Fight Nights
- 2022 in Brave Combat Federation
- 2022 in Road FC
- 2022 in Eagle Fighting Championship
- 2022 in Legacy Fighting Alliance
