= PFL 10 (2022) =

Professional Fighters League MMA event in 2022

- The poster for PFL 10
- Promotion: Professional Fighters League
- Date: November 25, 2022
- Venue: Hulu Theater
- City: New York City, New York

Event chronology
PFL 9	PFL 10	PFL Europe 1

The PFL 10 mixed martial arts event for the 2022 season of the Professional Fighters League was held on November 25, 2022, at the Hulu Theater in New York City, New York. This was the finale of the playoffs for all 2022 divisions, with the winners getting a $1 million cash prize. The event also marked the organization's first pay-per-view card, being available on ESPN+ PPV.

== Background ==
Kayla Harrison, a two-time Olympic gold medalist in judo and seeking her third PFL championship, headlined the PFL event opposite Larissa Pacheco, who previously faced Harrison in two other title bouts, losing both by unanimous decision. The event also featured five other finals matchups, with the winner of each weight class taking home PFL's trademark $1 million dollar prize.

The five other championship bouts included a welterweight bout between Sadibou Sy and Dilano Taylor, Brendan Loughnane versus Bellator vet Bubba Jenkins at featherweight, a heavyweight bout between Ante Delija and Matheus Scheffel, UFC vets Rob Wilkinson and Omari Akhmedov at light heavyweight, and another pair of UFC vets in Stevie Ray and Olivier Aubin-Mercier at lightweight.

The event was to feature the PFL debuts of Shane Burgos and former WSOF Bantamweight Champion Marlon Moraes, facing off in a featherweight bout. However, Burgos withdrew from the bout due to an injury. He was replaced by Sheymon Moraes.

== Results ==
Main card (ESPN+ PPV, 8 p.m. ET/5 p.m. PT)
Weight class				Method	Round	Time	Notes
Women's Lightweight	Larissa Pacheco	def.	Kayla Harrison	Decision (unanimous) (48–47, 48–47, 48–47)	5	5:00	(Note: For the 2022 PFL Women's Lightweight Championship.)
Featherweight	Brendan Loughnane	def.	Bubba Jenkins	TKO (punches and knee)	4	2:38	(Note: For the 2022 PFL Featherweight Championship.)
Heavyweight	Ante Delija	def.	Matheus Scheffel	TKO (punches)	1	2:50	(Note: For the 2022 PFL Heavyweight Championship.)
Women's Featherweight	Aspen Ladd	def.	Julia Budd	Decision (split) (29–28, 28–29, 29–28)	3	5:00
Lightweight	Olivier Aubin-Mercier	def.	Stevie Ray	KO (punch)	2	4:40	(Note: For the 2022 PFL Lightweight Championship.)
Welterweight	Sadibou Sy	def.	Dilano Taylor	Decision (unanimous) (49–46, 49–46, 49–46)	5	5:00	(Note: For the 2022 PFL Welterweight Championship.)
Light Heavyweight	Rob Wilkinson	def.	Omari Akhmedov	TKO (doctor stoppage)	2	5:00	(Note: For the 2022 PFL Light Heavyweight Championship.)
Preliminary card (ESPN+, 6 p.m. ET/3 p.m. PT)
Featherweight	Sheymon Moraes	def.	Marlon Moraes	TKO (punches)	3	0:58
Lightweight	Natan Schulte	def.	Jeremy Stephens	Submission (arm-triangle choke)	2	1:32
Catchweight (175 lbs)	Magomed Magomedkerimov	def.	Gleison Tibau	Decision (unanimous) (30–27, 30–27, 30–27)	3	5:00
Women's Flyweight	Dakota Ditcheva	def.	Katherine Corogenes	KO (punch)	1	4:20
Lightweight	Biaggio Ali Walsh	def.	Tom Graesser	KO (punch)	1	0:45	(Note: Amateur Bout)

== 2022 PFL Heavyweight playoffs ==
Semifinals
2	(Croatia) Ante Delija	TKO
3	(Brazil) Renan Ferreira	1
6	(United States) Juan Adams*	3
7	(Brazil) Matheus Scheffel*	TKO

Finals
2	(Croatia) Ante Delija	TKO
7	(Brazil) Matheus Scheffel	1

- Bruno Cappelozza was originally scheduled to face Denis Goltsov but was unable to continue in the tournament. He was replaced by #7 ranked Matheus Scheffel.
- Denis Goltsov was originally scheduled to face Matheus Scheffel but was unable to continue in the tournament. He was replaced by #6 ranked Juan Adams.

Legend
(SD)	(Split Decision)
(UD)	(Unanimous Decision)
(MD)	(Majority Decision)
SUB	Submission
(T)KO	(Technical) Knock Out
L	Loss

== 2022 PFL Light Heavyweight playoffs ==
Semifinals
1	(Australia) Rob Wilkinson	TKO
4	(Brazil) Delan Monte	1
2	(Russia) Omari Akhmedov	UD
5	(United States) Josh Silveira	3

Finals
1	(Australia) Rob Wilkinson	TKO
2	(Russia) Omari Akhmedov	2

- Antônio Carlos Júnior was originally scheduled to face Omari Akhmedov but was unable to continue in the tournament. He was replaced by #5 ranked Josh Silveira.

Legend
(SD)	(Split Decision)
(UD)	(Unanimous Decision)
(MD)	(Majority Decision)
SUB	Submission
(T)KO	(Technical) Knock Out
L	Loss

== 2022 PFL Welterweight playoffs ==
Semifinals
1	(Canada) Rory MacDonald	1
7	(United States) Dilano Taylor*	TKO
2	(Sweden) Sadibou Sy	DEC
3	(Brazil) Carlos Leal	3

Finals
2	(Sweden) Sadibou Sy	UD
7	(United States) Dilano Taylor	5

- Magomed Umalatov was originally scheduled to face Rory MacDonald but was unable to continue in the tournament. He was replaced by #7 ranked Dilano Taylor.

Legend
(SD)	(Split Decision)
(UD)	(Unanimous Decision)
(MD)	(Majority Decision)
SUB	Submission
(T)KO	(Technical) Knock Out
L	Loss

== 2022 PFL Lightweight playoffs ==
Semifinals
1	(United States) Anthony Pettis	3
4	(Scotland) Stevie Ray	UD
2	(Canada) Olivier Aubin-Mercier	UD
3	(Paraguay) Alex Martinez	3

Finals
4	(Scotland) Stevie Ray	2
2	(Canada) Olivier Aubin-Mercier	KO

Legend
(SD)	(Split Decision)
(UD)	(Unanimous Decision)
(MD)	(Majority Decision)
SUB	Submission
(T)KO	(Technical) Knock Out
L	Loss

== 2022 PFL Featherweight playoffs ==
Semifinals
1	(United States) Chris Wade	3
4	(England) Brendan Loughnane	DEC
2	(Japan) Ryoji Kudo	1
3	(United States) Bubba Jenkins	SUB

Finals
4	(England) Brendan Loughnane	TKO
3	(United States) Bubba Jenkins	4

Legend
(SD)	(Split Decision)
(UD)	(Unanimous Decision)
(MD)	(Majority Decision)
SUB	Submission
(T)KO	(Technical) Knock Out
L	Loss

== 2022 PFL Women's Lightweight playoffs ==
Semifinals
1	(Brazil) Larissa Pacheco	TKO
4	(Ukraine) Olena Kolesnyk	1
2	(United States) Kayla Harrison	SUB
3	(Czech Republic) Martina Jindrová	1

Finals
1	(Brazil) Larissa Pacheco	DEC
2	(United States) Kayla Harrison	5

Legend
(SD)	(Split Decision)
(UD)	(Unanimous Decision)
(MD)	(Majority Decision)
SUB	Submission
(T)KO	(Technical) Knock Out
L	Loss

== See also ==
- List of PFL events
- List of current PFL fighters
