= Leonardo Mafra =

Brazilian mixed martial arts fighter

- Born: Leonardo Mafra Teixeira; 25 April 1989 (age 37); Santo André, São Paulo, Brazil
- Other names: Macarrão
- Height: 5 ft 10 in (1.78 m)
- Weight: 170 lb (77 kg; 12 st 2 lb)
- Division: Middleweight; Welterweight; Light welterweight Lightweight
- Reach: 70.0 in (178 cm)
- Fighting out of: Balneário Camboriú, Santa Catarina, Brazil
- Team: Chute Boxe; American Kickboxing Academy (2015–present)
- Rank: Black belt in Muay Thai; Brown belt in Brazilian Jiu-Jitsu
- Years active: 2010–present

Mixed martial arts record
- Total: 22
- Wins: 15
- By knockout: 9
- By submission: 1
- By decision: 5
- Losses: 7
- By knockout: 5
- By submission: 2

Other information
- Mixed martial arts record from Sherdog

Leonardo Mafra Teixeira (born 25 April 1989), better known as Leonardo Mafra, is a Brazilian mixed martial artist currently competing in the Welterweight division. A professional competitor since 2010, he has fought for the UFC, Final Fight Championship, and Pancrase.

== Background ==
Mafra was born and spent his early childhood in the Brazilian city of Santo André and began training in mixed martial arts as a teenager.

== Mixed martial arts career ==
=== Early career ===
Mafra later moved to Balneário Camboriú and made his professional debut in the Welterweight division in early 2011. He compiled a record of 6–0 competing for regional promotions in his native Brazil, before auditioning for The Ultimate Fighter.

=== The Ultimate Fighter: Brazil ===
In February 2012, it was announced that Mafra would be a cast member on The Ultimate Fighter: Brazil, representing Team Wanderlei at middleweight.

Mafra got into the house with a decision win over Samuel Trindade. In his quarterfinal fight, Mafra was submitted (guillotine choke) in the second round by the eventual winner, Cezar Ferreira, and was subsequently eliminated from the competition.

=== Ultimate Fighting Championship ===
Mafra made his official debut facing fellow castmate, Thiago Perpétuo on 23 June 2012 at UFC 147. Mafra lost the fight via TKO in the third round. Subsequently, Mafra was released from the promotion.

Mafra made a return to the welterweight division and the regional scene in Brazil, where he was able to string a five fight win streak, finishing all of his opponents by way of KO/TKO, before getting a return call to the UFC.

Mafra was tabbed as a short notice replacement as he faced Rick Story on 16 July 2014 at UFC Fight Night 45, filling in for an injured John Howard. Story defeated Mafra via submission in the second round.

Mafra faced Cain Carrizosa on 21 March 2015 at UFC Fight Night 62. Mafra won the fight by unanimous decision.

Mafra faced Stevie Ray on 18 July 2015 at UFC Fight Night 72. He lost the fight by TKO in the first round and was subsequently released from the promotion.

=== Post-UFC career ===
After being released by the UFC, Mafra signed with the Croatian promotion Final Fight Championship for an MMA bout against another UFC veteran: Anthony Njokuani. Mafra won the fight via unanimous decision.

Mafra was scheduled to face João Carvalho at Imortal FC 5 on 23 July 2016. However, the bout was cancelled due to an unknown reason.

He then faced Satoru Kitaoka at Pancrase 281 on 2 October 2016. He lost the fight via first-round submission.

Mafra was scheduled to face Mohammad Fakhreddine at Brave 6: Kazakhstan on 28 April 2017 but failed to make weight and the bout was cancelled.

Mafra then returned to his native Brazilian circuit and was scheduled to face Luiz Cado at Imortal FC 7 on 11 November 2017. However, Cado withdrew from the bout and was replaced by Rogério Santos. He won the fight via technical knockout due to leg kicks.

==== Brave CF ====
Mafra signed a contract with Brave CF in 2018 and made his promotional debut against Gadzhimusa Gaziev at Brave CF 12 on 11 May 2018. He lost the fight via first-round technical knockout due to an injury.

Mafra made his sophomore appearance in the promotion against Djamil Chan at Brave CF 25 on 30 August 2019. He won the fight via unanimous decision.

He was then scheduled to face Carl Booth at Brave CF 35 on 28 March 2020 but the event was postponed due to the COVID-19 pandemic and the bout was scrapped.

Mafra then challenged Eldar Eldarov for the BRAVE Combat Federation Super Lightweight Championship at Brave CF 46 on 16 January 2021. He lost the fight via doctor stoppage after the first round.

== Mixed martial arts record ==
Professional record breakdown
22 matches	15 wins	7 losses
By knockout	9	5
By submission	1	2
By decision	5	0

Res.	Record	Opponent	Method	Event	Date	Round	Time	Location	Notes
Loss	15-7	Cleiton Silva	KO (spinning backfist)	Brave CF 60	30 July 2022	2	2:42	Isa Town, Bahrain	
Loss	15–6	Eldar Eldarov	TKO (doctor stoppage)	Brave CF 46	16 January 2021	1	5:00	Sochi, Russia	For BCF Super Lightweight (165 lbs) Championship.
Win	15–5	Djamil Chan	Decision (unanimous)	Brave CF 25	30 August 2019	3	5:00	Belo Horizonte, Brazil	Super Lightweight (165 lbs) debut.
Loss	14–5	Gadzhimusa Gadzhiev	TKO (injury)	Brave CF 12: KHK Legacy	11 May 2018	1	4:58	Jakarta, Indonesia	Catchweight (163 lbs) bout.
Win	14–4	Rogerio Santos	TKO (leg kicks)	Imortal FC 7	11 November 2017	3	2:24	Paraná, Brazil	Return to Welterweight.
Loss	13–4	Satoru Kitaoka	Submission (heel hook)	Pancrase: 281	2 October 2016	1	1:05	Tokyo, Japan	
Win	13–3	Anthony Njokuani	Decision (unanimous)	FFC 25: Mitchell vs. Lopez	11 June 2016	3	5:00	Springfield, Massachusetts, United States	
Loss	12–3	Stevie Ray	TKO (punches)	UFC Fight Night: Bisping vs. Leites	18 July 2015	1	2:30	Glasgow, Scotland	
Win	12–2	Cain Carrizosa	Decision (unanimous)	UFC Fight Night: Maia vs. LaFlare	21 March 2015	3	5:00	Rio de Janeiro, Brazil	Lightweight debut.
Loss	11–2	Rick Story	Submission (arm-triangle choke)	UFC Fight Night: Cowboy vs. Miller	16 July 2014	2	2:12	Atlantic City, New Jersey, United States	
Win	10–2	Antonio Marcos	KO (knees)	Power Fight Extreme 11	17 May 2014	1	1:36	Curitiba, Brazil	
Win	9–2	Alexandre Goncalves	TKO (punches and elbows)	NCF 19	8 February 2014	2	2:30	Balneário Camboriú, Brazil	
Win	9–1	Marcos Cacador	TKO (punches)	Max Sport: 13.2	11 May 2013	2	0:50	São Paulo, Brazil	Catchweight (176 lbs) bout.
Win	8–1	Samuel Trindade	TKO (doctor stoppage)	Iron Fight Combat 3	23 March 2013	2	5:00	Feira de Santana, Brazil	Won the Iron FC Welterweight Championship.
Win	7–1	Deivid Santos	KO (punch)	Sparta MMA	10 August 2012	1	0:23	Itajaí, Brazil	Return to Welterweight.
Loss	6–1	Thiago Perpétuo	TKO (punches)	UFC 147	23 June 2012	3	0:41	Belo Horizonte, Brazil	Middleweight debut.
Win	6–0	Douglas Del Rio	Submission (armbar)	NCF 9	10 December 2011	1	1:55	Itajaí, Brazil	
Win	5–0	Dimitry Burgo	TKO (punches)	K.O. Fight: GZero	20 August 2011	1	3:45	Londrina, Brazil	
Win	4–0	Santiago Ponzinibbio	TKO (punches)	Centurion Mixed Martial Arts 2	9 July 2011	1	3:17	Itajaí, Brazil	
Win	3–0	Willian Coelho	Decision (unanimous)	Black Trunk Fight 2	15 May 2011	3	5:00	Florianópolis, Brazil	
Win	2–0	Maiquel Bigolin	Decision (unanimous)	Floripa Fight 7	12 March 2011	3	5:00	Florianópolis, Brazil	
Win	1–0	Geverson Pereira	TKO (punches)	NCF 6	5 February 2011	1	3:53	Brusque, Brazil	

== See also ==
- List of male mixed martial artists
- List of current Brave CF fighters
