= Rob Wilkinson =

Australian mixed martial artist (born 1992)

- Born: 22 February 1992 (age 34); Hobart, Tasmania, Australia
- Other names: Razor
- Height: 6 ft 3 in (191 cm)
- Weight: 205 lb (93 kg; 14 st 9 lb)
- Division: Light Heavyweight (2019–present); Middleweight (2011–2018)
- Reach: 76 in (193 cm)
- Fighting out of: Sydney, Australia
- Team: VT1 gym Hybrid Training Centre; Factory X (2022–present)
- Teacher: Priscus Fogagnolo (BJJ)
- Rank: Blue belt in Brazilian Jiu-Jitsu under Priscus Fogagnolo
- Years active: 2011–present

Professional boxing record
- Total: 1
- Wins: 1
- By knockout: 1

Kickboxing record
- Total: 2
- Wins: 2
- By knockout: 1

Mixed martial arts record
- Total: 25
- Wins: 20
- By knockout: 11
- By submission: 7
- By decision: 2
- Losses: 4
- By knockout: 3
- By decision: 1
- No contests: 1

Other information
- Boxing record from BoxRec
- Mixed martial arts record from Sherdog

Rob Wilkinson (born 22 February 1992) is an Australian mixed martial artist who competes in the Light heavyweight division. A professional competitor since 2011, he previously competed in Professional Fighters League (PFL), where he won the championship in 2022, in the Middleweight division of the Ultimate Fighting Championship, and was the middleweight champion in Australian Fighting Championship and BRACE.

== Background ==
Wilkinson was born in Hobart, Tasmania, Australia where he currently resides. Wilkinson started training at the age of 17 at Hobart's Hybrid Training Centre, and was a personal trainer prior to taking up a career in MMA. He started training MMA after watching a video on YouTube of Randy Couture which he instantly fell in love with the sport.

== Mixed martial arts career ==
=== Early career ===
Wilkinson made his professional debut in 2011 and amassed a record of 11–0. He has won all fights via stoppage but one and holds 9 out of his 11 fights in the 1st round, en route to capturing both Australian Fighting Championship middleweight title and BRACE middleweight championship belt. He last competed in a battle of undefeated fighters, submitted German Alexander Poppeck in the first round in Finland prior signed by UFC.

=== Ultimate Fighting Championship ===
Wilkinson made his promotional debut on 2 September 2017 at UFC Fight Night: Volkov vs. Struve, replacing injured Abu Azaitar, against Siyar Bahadurzada. He lost the fight via TKO in round two, handing him his first career loss.

Wilkinson faced Israel Adesanya on 11 February 2018 at UFC 221. He lost the fight via TKO in the second round.

On 14 August 2018 it was announced that Wilkinson was released from UFC.

=== Post-UFC career ===
In 2019, Wilkinson competed in two kickboxing bouts, winning both and earning a record of 2–0.

Almost two years since his previous MMA bout, Wilkinson moved up to the light heavyweight division and faced Dylan Andrews at AFC 23 on 1 December 2019. He won the fight via first-round submission.

On 9 April 2021 Wilkinson defeated Daniel Almeida via first-round TKO, winning the Hex Fight Series Light Heavyweight Championship.

Wilkinson was scheduled to defend his title against Sam Kei at Hex Fight 22 on 9 July 2021. However, the bout was scrapped due to unknown reason.

=== Professional Fighters League ===
==== 2022 Season ====
Wilkinson faced Bruce Souto on 23 April 2022 at PFL 1. He won the bout via ground and pound technical knockout in the second round.

Wilkinson faced Viktor Pešta on 17 June 2022 at PFL 4. He won the bout via TKO stoppage in the first round.

Wilkinson faced Delan Monte in the Semifinals off the Light Heavyweight tournament on 5 August 2022 at PFL 7. He won the bout in the first round, knocking out Monte after landing a knee and then finishing him off with punches.

In the finals of the Light Heavyweight tournament, Wilkinson faced Omari Akhmedov on 25 November 2022 at PFL 10. He won the bout after the fight was stopped by the doctor due to a cut after the second round, also winning the $1 million collective tournament pool.

==== 2023 Season ====
Wilkinson started the 2023 season against former UFC Light Heavyweight title challenger Thiago Santos on 1 April 2023 at PFL 1. He won the bout via unanimous decision. The result of the bout was later overturned to a no contest after Wilkinson tested positive for Elevated t/e ratio resulting from the androgynous origin of testosterone.

Wilkinson was scheduled to face Will Fleury on 8 June 2023 at PFL 4. After Fleury had failed a commission drug test, he was replaced by Ty Flores. However, on May 31 it was revealed that Wilkinson also failed a drug test. In process, he was pulled out of the 2023 season and Daniel Spohn replaced him in the bout against Flores. Wilkinson was later suspended 9 months and fined for his positive drug test.

==== 2024 Season ====
Wilkinson started the 2024 season with a bout against Tom Breese on 12 April 2024 at PFL 2. He won the fight by first-round technical knockout with a knee and punches.

Wilkinson faced Josh Silveira in his next bout at PFL 5 on 21 June 2024, winning the close bout via split decision.

Wilkinson faced Dovletdzhan Yagshimuradov in the semifinals of the 2024 Light Heavyweight tournament on 16 August 2024 at PFL 8. He lost the fight by unanimous decision.

==== 2025 Tournament ====
On March 4, 2025, the promotion officially revealed that Wilkinson will join the 2025 PFL Light Heavyweight Tournament.

In the quarterfinal, Wilkinson faced Phil Davis on May 1, 2025, at PFL 4. He lost the fight by technical knockout in the second round.

==== 2026 ====
Wilkinson faced Luke Trainer on February 7, 2026, at PFL Dubai: Nurmagomedov vs. Davis, and lost the bout via submission in the first round.

Wilkinson faced Abraham Bably on June 27, 2026, at PFL San Diego. He won the fight via technical knockout in round two.

On November 11, 2026, it was announced that Wilkinson was no longer with PFL.

== Boxing career ==
Having problems finding mixed martial arts fights, Wilkinson opted to compete also in boxing, making his debut against Jayden Joseph for the vacant Tasmanian Heavyweight title on 30 October 2021. He won the fight via fifth-round technical knockout.

== Championships and accomplishments ==
=== Mixed martial arts ===
- Professional Fighters League
  - 2022 PFL Light Heavyweight Championship
- Australian Fighting Championship
  - AFC Middleweight Championship (one time)
- BRACE
  - BRACE Middleweight Championship (one time)
- Hex Fight Series
  - Hex Fight Series Light Heavyweight Championship (one time)
- Sherdog
  - 2022 Comeback Fighter of the Year
- MMA Fighting
  - 2022 First Team MMA All-Star

== Mixed martial arts record ==
Professional record breakdown
26 matches	20 wins	5 losses
By knockout	11	3
By submission	7	1
By decision	2	1
No contests	1	

Res.	Record	Opponent	Method	Event	Date	Round	Time	Location	Notes
Win	20–5 (1)	Abraham Bably	TKO (punches)	PFL San Diego: McKee vs. Isbulaev	June 27, 2026	2	3:23	San Diego, California, United States	
Loss	19–5 (1)	Luke Trainer	Submission (guillotine choke)	PFL Dubai: Nurmagomedov vs. Davis	February 7, 2026	1	3:48	Dubai, United Arab Emirates	
Loss	19–4 (1)	Phil Davis	TKO (punches)	PFL 4 (2025)	May 1, 2025	2	0:51	Orlando, Florida, United States	2025 PFL Light Heavyweight Tournament Quarterfinal.
Loss	19–3 (1)	Dovletdzhan Yagshimuradov	Decision (unanimous)	PFL 8 (2024)	16 August 2024	3	5:00	Hollywood, Florida, United States	2024 PFL Light Heavyweight Tournament Semifinal.
Win	19–2 (1)	Josh Silveira	Decision (split)	PFL 5 (2024)	21 June 2024	3	5:00	Salt Lake City, Utah, United States	
Win	18–2 (1)	Tom Breese	TKO (knee and punches)	PFL 2 (2024)	12 April 2024	1	1:10	Las Vegas, Nevada, United States	
NC	17–2 (1)	Thiago Santos	NC (overturned)	PFL 1 (2023)	1 April 2023	3	5:00	Las Vegas, Nevada, United States	Originally a unanimous decision win for Wilkinson; overturned after he tested positive for elevated T/E ratio.
Win	17–2	Omari Akhmedov	TKO (doctor stoppage)	PFL 10 (2022)	25 November 2022	2	5:00	New York City, New York, United States	Won the 2022 PFL Light Heavyweight Tournament.
Win	16–2	Delan Monte	KO (punches and knee)	PFL 7 (2022)	5 August 2022	1	1:37	New York City, New York, United States	2022 PFL Light Heavyweight Tournament Semifinal.
Win	15–2	Viktor Pesta	TKO (punches)	PFL 4 (2022)	17 June 2022	1	3:03	Atlanta, Georgia, United States	
Win	14–2	Bruce Souto	TKO (punches)	PFL 1 (2022)	20 April 2022	2	0:46	Arlington, Texas, United States	
Win	13–2	Daniel Almeida	KO (punches)	Hex Fight Series 21	9 April 2021	1	1:22	Melbourne, Australia	Won the Hex Fight Series Light Heavyweight Championship.
Win	12–2	Dylan Andrews	Submission (guillotine choke)	Australian FC 23	1 December 2019	1	3:03	Melbourne, Australia	Return to Light Heavyweight.
Loss	11–2	Israel Adesanya	TKO (knees and punches)	UFC 221	11 February 2018	2	3:37	Perth, Australia	
Loss	11–1	Siyar Bahadurzada	TKO (punches)	UFC Fight Night: Volkov vs. Struve	2 September 2017	2	3:10	Rotterdam, Netherlands	
Win	11–0	Alexander Poppeck	Submission (rear-naked choke)	EuroFC 01	1 October 2016	1	3:51	Espoo, Finland	
Win	10–0	Jamie Abdallah	TKO (punches)	Australian FC 15	19 March 2016	3	4:07	Melbourne, Australia	Won the AFC Middleweight Championship.
Win	9–0	Daniel Schardt	Submission (guillotine choke)	Australian FC 14	12 September 2015	1	3:28	Melbourne, Australia	
Win	8–0	Gerhard Voigt	Submission (rear-naked choke)	Brace For War: Tournament Season 1 Final	22 November 2014	1	3:45	Canberra, Australia	Won the BRACE Middleweight Championship.
Win	7–0	Rick Alchin	TKO (elbows)	Brace For War 28	8 August 2014	1	4:16	Sydney, Australia	
Win	6–0	Kitt Campbell	Submission (triangle choke)	Brace For War 27	17 May 2014	1	1:32	Canberra, Australia	
Win	5–0	Benjamin Kelleher	Decision (unanimous)	Submission 4	17 August 2013	3	5:00	Alice Springs, Australia	
Win	4–0	Ady Sutton	Submission (armbar)	Valor Fight 3	8 December 2012	1	3:47	Launceston, Australia	Return to Middleweight.
Win	3–0	Ty Shar	Submission (rear-naked choke)	Sport Fight 31	4 August 2012	1	1:42	Manson, Washington, United States	Light Heavyweight debut.
Win	2–0	Marc Gehret	TKO (punches)	Brace For War 14	12 February 2012	1	4:55	Canberra, Australia	
Win	1–0	Dallas Wilkinson-Reed	TKO (punches)	Brace For War 12	15 October 2011	1	N/A	Hobart, Australia	Middleweight debut.

== Professional boxing record ==
1 fight	1 win	0 losses
By knockout	1	0

No.	Result	Record	Opponent	Type	Round, time	Date	Location	Notes
1	Win	1–0	Jayden Joseph	TKO	5 (8), 1:37	30 October 2021	Hobart City Hall, Hobart, Tasmania, Australia	Won vacant Tasmania State heavyweight title

== Kickboxing record ==
Kickboxing record
2 wins (1 (T)KO), 0 losses, 0 draws.
Date	Result	Opponent	Event	Location	Method	Round	Time
2019-08-24	Win	(Australia) Patrick Dittrich	Tasmanian Fighting Championships 2	Hobart, Australia	Decision (split)	5	3:00
2019-05-18	Win	(Australia) Joe Tullo	Tasmanian Fighting Championships 1	Hobart, Australia	KO	2	1:28
Legend: Win Loss Draw/No contest Notes

== See also ==
- List of male mixed martial artists
