= Omari Akhmedov =

Russian professional mixed martial artist

- Born: October 12, 1987 (age 39); Kizlyar, Dagestan ASSR, Russian SFSR, Soviet Union
- Other names: Wolverine
- Nationality: Russian
- Height: 6 ft 0 in (183 cm)
- Weight: 205 lb (93 kg; 14 st 9 lb)
- Division: Light Heavyweight; Middleweight; Welterweight
- Reach: 73 in (185 cm)
- Style: Combat Sambo, Pankration, ARB
- Fighting out of: Makhachkala, Dagestan, Russia
- Team: DagFighter MMA, Eagles MMA; American Top Team (2016–present)
- Rank: International Master of Sport in Combat Sambo; 2nd dan black belt and International Master of Sport in Army Hand-to-Hand Combat
- Years active: 2010–present

Mixed martial arts record
- Total: 35
- Wins: 26
- By knockout: 9
- By submission: 7
- By decision: 10
- Losses: 8
- By knockout: 4
- By submission: 2
- By decision: 2
- Draws: 1

Other information
- Mixed martial arts record from Sherdog

Omari Sirazhudinovich Akhmedov (born October 12, 1987) is a Russian professional mixed martial artist who currently competes in the Light Heavyweight division. He previously fought in the Ultimate Fighting Championship and Professional Fighters League (PFL).

== Background ==
Akhmedov was born on October 12, 1987, in the town of Kizlyar in modern-day Dagestan, Russia, in a Lak family and is a devout Sunni Muslim. Like many children in Dagestan, Akhmedov engaged in freestyle wrestling from a young age and would go on to hold an accomplished career in the sport before transitioning to MMA. Before his career in MMA, Akhmedov also had accomplished careers in combat sambo, as well as Russian hand-to-hand combat and Russian pankration.

== Mixed martial arts career ==
=== Early career ===
Akhmedov made his professional MMA debut on January 30, 2010, when he faced Iskhan Zakharian at ProFC: Fight Night 2. He won the fight via rear-naked choke. Following this, Akhmedov would compile a professional record of 12–1 before being signed by the Ultimate Fighting Championship in September 2013.

=== Ultimate Fighting Championship ===
Akhmedov signed a four-fight deal with the UFC in September 2013.

In his promotional debut, Akhmedov faced Thiago Perpétuo on November 9, 2013, at UFC Fight Night 32. It was a back-and-forth fight that saw both men rocked by punches before Akhmedov won the fight via knockout. The win also earned him his first Fight of the Night bonus award. After the fight, Akhmedov expressed a desire to move down to welterweight.

In his welterweight debut, Akhmedov faced Gunnar Nelson on March 8, 2014, at UFC Fight Night: Gustafsson vs. Manuwa. He lost the fight via guillotine choke submission in the first round.

Akhmedov faced Mats Nilsson on January 3, 2015, at UFC 182. He won the fight by unanimous decision.

Akhmedov faced Brian Ebersole on June 6, 2015, at UFC Fight Night 68, replacing an injured Alan Jouban. He won the fight via TKO after Ebersole was unable to continue after the first round due to a knee injury sustained from a kick by Akhmedov.

Akhmedov was expected to face Lyman Good on December 10, 2015, at UFC Fight Night 80. However, Good was pulled from the bout in late October and was replaced by Sérgio Moraes.

Akhmedov next faced Elizeu Zaleski dos Santosi on April 16, 2016, at UFC on Fox 19. After arguably winning the first two rounds, Akhmedov was stopped via TKO in the third round. The back and forth action earned both participants Fight of the Night honors.

Akhmedov was tabbed as a short notice replacement for Dominique Steele and faced Kyle Noke on November 27, 2016, at UFC Fight Night 101. He won the fight via unanimous decision.

Akhmedov faced Abdul Razak Alhassan on May 28, 2017, at UFC Fight Night 109. He won the fight by split decision.

Akhmedov faced Marvin Vettori on December 30, 2017, at UFC 219. One of the judges scored it 29–28 for Vettori, and the others viewed it as a 28–28 draw, with Akhmedov winning the first two rounds, but Vettori having a dominant 10–8 round in the third. 10 out of 15 media outlets scored the bout for Akhmedov while 3 of the 15 scored the bout as a draw.

Akhmedov was expected to face CB Dollaway on September 15, 2018, at UFC Fight Night 136. However, Akhmedov pulled out of the fight in early September and was replaced by promotional newcomer Artem Frolov.

Akhmedov faced Tim Boetsch on March 9, 2019, at UFC Fight Night 147. He won the fight by unanimous decision.

Akhmedov faced Zak Cummings on September 7, 2019, at UFC 242. He won the fight by unanimous decision.

Akhmedov faced Ian Heinisch on December 14, 2019, at UFC 245. He won the fight via unanimous decision.

Akhmedov faced Chris Weidman on August 8, 2020, at UFC Fight Night 174. He lost the fight via unanimous decision.

Akhmedov was briefly linked to a rematch with Marvin Vettori on December 12, 2020, at UFC 256. However, Akhmedov was removed from the bout in mid-October for undisclosed reasons.

Akhmedov was expected to face Tom Breese on January 16, 2021, at UFC on ABC 1. During fight week, the UFC opted to move the bout to UFC on ESPN: Chiesa vs. Magny. He won the bout via second round arm triangle submission.

Akhmedov faced Brad Tavares on July 10, 2021, at UFC 264. He lost the fight via split decision.

After his bout with Tavares, it was announced on July 15, that Akhmedov was released from the UFC.

=== Professional Fighters League ===
Akhmedov faced Jordan Young on October 27, 2021, at PFL 10. He lost the bout via TKO in the third round.

==== 2022 season ====
Akhmedov faced Viktor Pešta on April 23, 2022, at PFL 1. He won the bout after knocking Pešta out in first round.

Akhmedov faced Teodoras Aukštuolis on June 17, 2022, at PFL 4. He won the bout after choking out Teodoras in the second round via arm-triangle choke.

Akhmedov was scheduled to face Antônio Carlos Júnior in the Semifinals off the Light Heavyweight tournament on August 5, 2022, at PFL 7. However, Antonio suffered an ACL injury requiring surgery, being replaced by Josh Silveira for the playoffs. Akhmedov won the bout via unanimous decision.

Akhmedov faced Rob Wilkinson in the finals of the Light Heavyweight tournament on November 25, 2022, at PFL 10. He lost the bout after the fight was stopped by the doctor due to a cut after the second round.

==== 2023 season ====
Akhmedov was set to start the 2023 season against Will Fleury on April 1, 2023, at PFL 1. However, Akhmedov was forced to withdraw due to suffering an injury and was replaced by Krzysztof Jotko.

=== Global Fight League ===
Akhmedov was scheduled to face Derek Brunson in the inaugural Global Fight League event on May 24, 2025 at GFL 1. However, all GFL events were cancelled indefinitely.

== Championships and awards ==
=== Mixed martial arts ===
- Ultimate Fighting Championship
  - Fight of the Night (Two times) vs. Thiago Perpétuo and Elizeu Zaleski dos Santos

=== Pankration ===
- Pankration Federation Russia
  - Russian National Pankration Champion (Two times)

=== Hand-to-hand combat ===
- Russian Union of Martial Arts
  - Russian National Hand-to-Hand Combat Champion (Two times)

=== Sambo ===
- Combat Sambo Federation of Russia
  - Dagestan Combat Sambo Champion

== Mixed martial arts record ==
Professional record breakdown
35 matches	26 wins	8 losses
By knockout	9	4
By submission	7	2
By decision	10	2
Draws	1	

Res.	Record	Opponent	Method	Event	Date	Round	Time	Location	Notes
Win	26–8–1	Kim Myung-hwan	Decision (unanimous)	World X-Impact Federation: APEC 2025 Korea Summit Commemorative World MMA Competition	October 30, 2025	3	4:00	Seoul, South Korea	Catchweight (220 lb) bout.
Win	25–8–1	Rodrigo Correia	TKO (punches)	Ural FC x Ozon: Akhmedov vs. Cavaleiro	October 17, 2025	2	N/A	Kaspiysk, Russia	Middleweight bout; Correia missed weight (187.8 lb).
Loss	24–8–1	Rob Wilkinson	TKO (doctor stoppage)	PFL 10 (2022)	November 25, 2022	2	5:00	New York City, New York, United States	2022 PFL Light Heavyweight Tournament Final.
Win	24–7–1	Josh Silveira	Decision (unanimous)	PFL 7 (2022)	August 5, 2022	3	5:00	New York City, New York, United States	2022 PFL Light Heavyweight Tournament Semifinal.
Win	23–7–1	Teodoras Aukštuolis	Technical Submission (arm-triangle choke)	PFL 4 (2022)	June 17, 2022	2	2:50	Atlanta, Georgia, United States	
Win	22–7–1	Viktor Pešta	KO (punches)	PFL 1 (2022)	April 20, 2022	1	1:25	Arlington, Texas, United States	
Loss	21–7–1	Jordan Young	TKO (punches)	PFL 10 (2021)	October 27, 2021	3	1:32	Hollywood, Florida, United States	Return to Light Heavyweight.
Loss	21–6–1	Brad Tavares	Decision (split)	UFC 264	July 10, 2021	3	5:00	Las Vegas, Nevada, United States	
Win	21–5–1	Tom Breese	Submission (arm-triangle choke)	UFC on ESPN: Chiesa vs. Magny	January 20, 2021	2	1:41	Abu Dhabi, United Arab Emirates	
Loss	20–5–1	Chris Weidman	Decision (unanimous)	UFC Fight Night: Lewis vs. Oleinik	August 8, 2020	3	5:00	Las Vegas, Nevada, United States	
Win	20–4–1	Ian Heinisch	Decision (unanimous)	UFC 245	December 14, 2019	3	5:00	Las Vegas, Nevada, United States	
Win	19–4–1	Zak Cummings	Decision (unanimous)	UFC 242	September 7, 2019	3	5:00	Abu Dhabi, United Arab Emirates	
Win	18–4–1	Tim Boetsch	Decision (unanimous)	UFC Fight Night: Lewis vs. dos Santos	March 9, 2019	3	5:00	Wichita, Kansas, United States	
Draw	17–4–1	Marvin Vettori	Draw (majority)	UFC 219	December 30, 2017	3	5:00	Las Vegas, Nevada, United States	Return to Middleweight.
Win	17–4	Abdul Razak Alhassan	Decision (split)	UFC Fight Night: Gustafsson vs. Teixeira	May 28, 2017	3	5:00	Stockholm, Sweden	
Win	16–4	Kyle Noke	Decision (unanimous)	UFC Fight Night: Whittaker vs. Brunson	November 27, 2016	3	5:00	Melbourne, Australia	
Loss	15–4	Elizeu Zaleski dos Santos	TKO (punches and knees)	UFC on Fox: Teixeira vs. Evans	April 16, 2016	3	3:03	Tampa, Florida, United States	Fight of the Night.
Loss	15–3	Sérgio Moraes	TKO (punches)	UFC Fight Night: Namajunas vs. VanZant	December 10, 2015	3	2:18	Las Vegas, Nevada, United States	
Win	15–2	Brian Ebersole	TKO (knee injury)	UFC Fight Night: Boetsch vs. Henderson	June 6, 2015	1	5:00	New Orleans, Louisiana, United States	
Win	14–2	Mats Nilsson	Decision (unanimous)	UFC 182	January 3, 2015	3	5:00	Las Vegas, Nevada, United States	
Loss	13–2	Gunnar Nelson	Submission (guillotine choke)	UFC Fight Night: Gustafsson vs. Manuwa	March 8, 2014	1	4:36	London, England	Welterweight debut.
Win	13–1	Thiago Perpétuo	KO (punches)	UFC Fight Night: Belfort vs. Henderson 2	November 9, 2013	1	3:31	Goiânia, Brazil	Fight of the Night.
Win	12–1	Fabricio Nascimento	Submission (guillotine choke)	North Landing Cup 2013	May 13, 2013	1	0:53	Khanty-Mansiysk, Russia	
Win	11–1	Rafał Haratyk	KO (punch)	Tech-Krep FC: Battle of Stars 1	December 22, 2012	1	2:26	Makhachkala, Russia	
Win	10–1	Sergey Karpov	Submission (guillotine choke)	Universal Fighter: Colosseum Battles Champions 1	October 21, 2012	1	4:58	Ufa, Russia	
Win	9–1	Aleksander Boyko	Submission (triangle choke)	Grand European FC: Odesa Golden Cup	May 9, 2012	1	1:02	Odesa, Ukraine	
Win	8–1	Aliyor Isakov	TKO (punches)	Governor's Cup of Saint Petersburg 2012	April 12, 2012	1	3:05	Saint Petersburg, Russia	Won the 2012 Governor's Cup Middleweight Tournament.
Win	7–1	Talekh Nazhav-Zade	TKO (punches)	Governor's Cup of Saint Petersburg 2012	April 12, 2012	1	0:20	Saint Petersburg, Russia	2012 Governor's Cup Middleweight Tournament Semifinal.
Win	6–1	Akbar Nabavizade	TKO (punches)	Governor's Cup of Saint Petersburg 2012	April 12, 2012	1	2:30	Saint Petersburg, Russia	Return to Middleweight. 2012 Governor's Cup Middleweight Tournament Quarterfinal.
Win	5–1	Mikhail Istomin	Submission (armbar)	ProFC 34: Global Grand Prix 3	October 1, 2011	1	1:22	Volgograd, Russia	Won the 2010 ProFC Light Heavyweight Tournament.
Win	4–1	Vladimir Semenov	Decision (split)	ProFC 34: Global Grand Prix 3	October 1, 2011	2	5:00	Volgograd, Russia	Light Heavyweight debut. 2010 ProFC Light Heavyweight Tournament Semifinal.
Win	3–1	Musa Arslangadzhiev	TKO (punches)	Urkarakh Fights 2011	July 22, 2010	1	3:50	Urkarakh, Russia	
Loss	2–1	Michail Tsarev	Submission (guillotine choke)	ProFC 21: Russia Cup Stage 2	November 28, 2010	2	4:29	Ufa, Russia	
Win	2–0	Magomed Umarov	Decision (unanimous)	Legion Fight: Black Sea Cup 2010 (Stage 2)	July 9, 2010	2	5:00	Anapa, Russia	
Win	1–0	Ishkhan Zakharian	Submission (rear-naked choke)	ProFC: Fight Night 2	January 30, 2010	1	3:40	Rostov-on-Don, Russia	Middleweight debut.

== See also ==
- List of male mixed martial artists
