= Thiago Perpétuo =

Brazilian mixed martial arts fighter

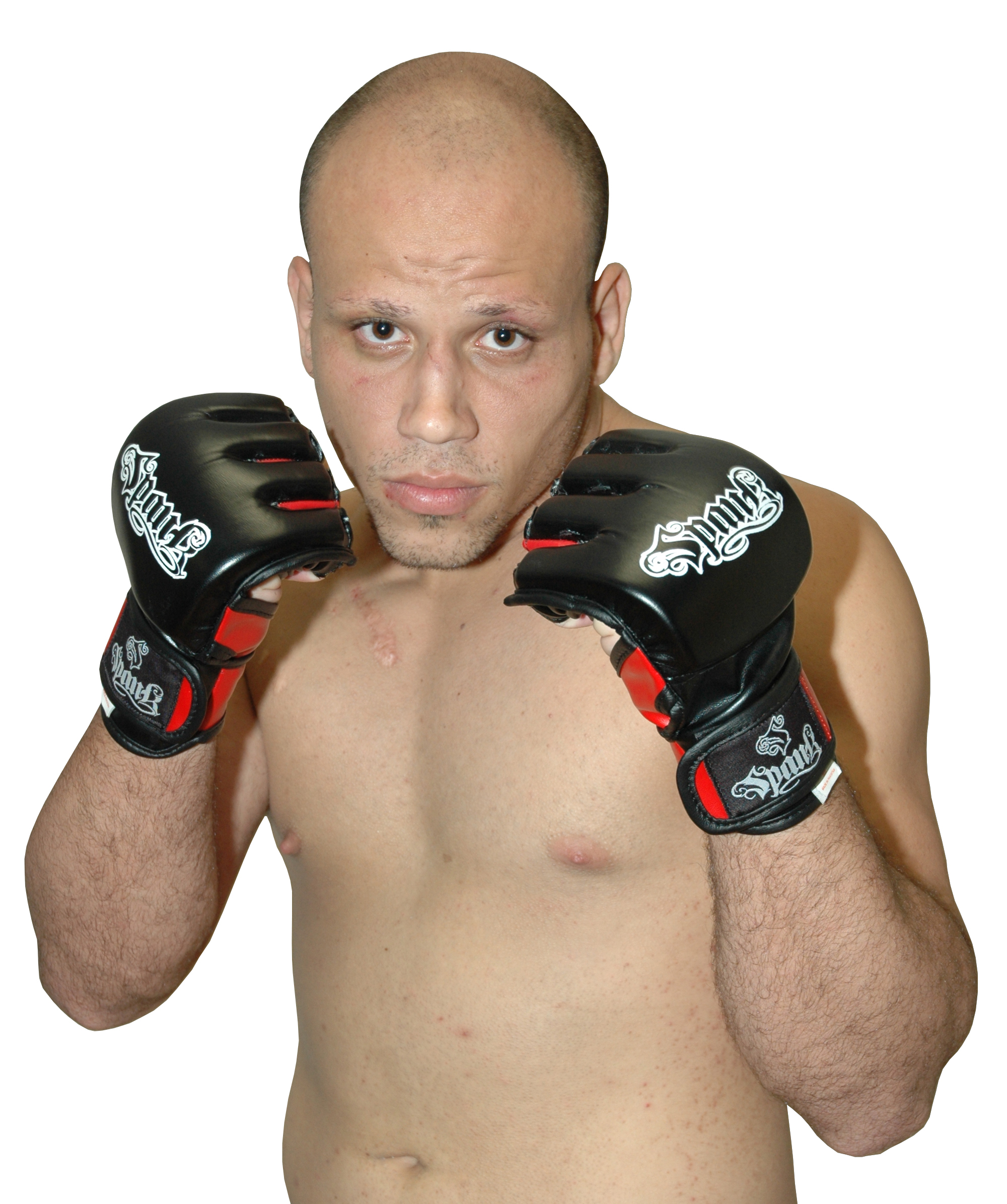
- Born: Thiago de Oliveira Perpétuo; December 14, 1986 (age 39); Santo Andre, Sao Paulo, Brazil
- Other names: Bodão
- Height: 5 ft 10 in (1.78 m)
- Weight: 184.7 lb (83.8 kg; 13.19 st)
- Division: Middleweight; Welterweight
- Reach: 71 in (180 cm)
- Fighting out of: Santo Andre, Sao Paulo, Brazil
- Team: Furacao Fight Team
- Years active: 2009-2015

Mixed martial arts record
- Total: 14
- Wins: 9
- By knockout: 7
- By submission: 1
- By decision: 1
- Losses: 4
- By knockout: 2
- By submission: 2
- Draws: 1

Other information
- Mixed martial arts record from Sherdog

Thiago de Oliveira Perpétuo (born December 14, 1986) is a Brazilian mixed martial artist who last competed in 2015. A professional since 2009, he has competed for the UFC, XFC, and was a competitor on The Ultimate Fighter: Brazil.

== Mixed martial arts career ==
=== The Ultimate Fighter ===
In March 2012, Perpétuo appeared as a fighter on The Ultimate Fighter: Brazil. Perpétuo defeated Joao Paulo De Souza via decision to move into the Ultimate Fighter house, and become an official cast member, fighting for Team Vitor.

In the first round of the competition, Perpétuo fought Francisco Trinaldo. Perpétuo won the fight via TKO (retirement) to move onto the semi-final round. Later, Dana White demanded that the teams be scrambled up and Perpétuo was sent to Team Wanderlei. He then faced eventual winner Cezar Ferreira for a spot in the final against Daniel Sarafian. He was defeated by Ferreira via KO (head kick) in round one.

=== Ultimate Fighting Championship ===
Perpétuo made his UFC debut on June 23, 2012, at UFC 147 against Leonardo Mafra. He won the fight via TKO in the third round.

Perpétuo was expected to face Michael Kuiper on January 19, 2013, at UFC on FX 7. However Perpetuo suffered an injury and was replaced by Caio Magalhaes.

Perpetuo made his return at UFC Fight Night 32 where he faced UFC newcomer Omari Akhmedov He lost the back-and-forth fight via knockout in the first round. Despite the loss on his record, Perpetuo was awarded a Fight of the Night bonus for this bout.

Perpetuo faced Kenny Robertson in a welterweight bout on March 23, 2014, at UFC Fight Night 38. He lost the fight via submission in the first round, and was subsequently released from the promotion shortly after.

== Championships and awards ==
=== Mixed martial arts ===
- Ultimate Fighting Championship
  - Fight of the Night (One time) vs. Omari Akhmedov

== Mixed martial arts record ==
Professional record breakdown
14 matches	9 wins	4 losses
By knockout	7	2
By submission	1	2
By decision	1	0
Draws	1	
No contests	0	

Res.	Record	Opponent	Method	Event	Date	Round	Time	Location	Notes
Loss	9–4–1	Alberto Uda	TKO (knee)	XFC i 13	December 5, 2015	1	2:19	Sao Paulo, Brazil	Return to Middleweight.
Loss	9–3–1	Kenny Robertson	Submission (rear-naked choke)	UFC Fight Night: Shogun vs. Henderson 2	March 23, 2014	1	1:45	Natal, Brazil	Welterweight debut.
Loss	9–2–1	Omari Akhmedov	KO (punches)	UFC Fight Night: Belfort vs. Henderson	November 9, 2013	1	3:31	Goiânia, Brazil	Fight of the Night.
Win	9–1–1	Leonardo Mafra	TKO (punches)	UFC 147	June 23, 2012	3	0:41	Belo Horizonte, Brazil	
Win	8–1–1	Edgar Castaldelli Filho	TKO (punches)	Max Fight 9	July 16, 2011	3	3:10	Campinas, Brazil	
Win	7–1–1	Willians Santos	Decision (unanimous)	Jungle Fight 26	April 2, 2011	3	5:00	São Paulo, Brazil	
Win	6–1–1	Thiago Tenorio	TKO (punches)	Conquest Fighting Championships	November 20, 2010	2	N/A	São Paulo, Brazil	
Win	5–1–1	Luis Matoso	TKO (punches)	Jungle Fight 20	May 22, 2010	3	2:12	São Paulo, Brazil	
Draw	4–1–1	Luis Matoso	Draw	Jungle Fight 19	April 17, 2010	3	5:00	Moema, Brazil	
Win	4–1	Rafael Navas	TKO (punches)	Iron Fight Championship 1	December 19, 2009	2	3:53	São Caetano do Sul, Brazil	
Loss	3–1	Danilo Pereira	Submission (rear-naked choke)	Full Fight 2	October 24, 2009	3	4:46	São Paulo, Brazil	
Win	3–0	Fernando Silva	TKO (punches)	Real Fight 7	October 3, 2009	1	3:20	São Paulo, Brazil	
Win	2–0	Alvaro Salles	Submission (rear-naked choke)	Tan Lan Fight 9	April 18, 2009	1	0:59	São Caetano do Sul, Brazil	
Win	1–0	Deschanael Deschanael	KO (punch)	Tan Lan Fight 9	April 18, 2009	1	0:23	São Caetano do Sul, Brazil	Middleweight debut.

=== Mixed martial arts exhibition record ===
Exhibition record breakdown		
3 matches	2 wins	1 loss
By knockout	1	1
By submission	0	0
By decision	1	0

Res.	Record	Opponent	Method	Event	Date	Round	Time	Location	Notes
Loss	2–1	(Brazil) Cezar Ferreira	KO (head kick)	The Ultimate Fighter: Brazil	N/A	1	1:22	Brazil	Fought at 185
Win	2–0	(Brazil) Francisco Trinaldo	TKO (retirement)	The Ultimate Fighter: Brazil	N/A	1	5:00	Brazil	Fought at 185
Win	1–0	(Brazil) Joao Paulo De Souza	Decision (unanimous)	The Ultimate Fighter: Brazil	N/A	2	5:00	Brazil	Fought at 185

== See also ==
- List of male mixed martial artists
