= Juan Adams =

American mixed martial artist

- Born: January 16, 1992 (age 34); Houston, Texas, U.S.
- Other names: The Kraken
- Height: 6 ft 5 in (1.96 m)
- Weight: 265 lb (120 kg; 18 st 13 lb)
- Division: Heavyweight
- Reach: 81 in (206 cm)
- Style: Wrestling
- Fighting out of: Houston, Texas, U.S.
- Team: Paradigm Training; Jackson Wink MMA Academy (2019–present)
- Wrestling: NCAA Division I Wrestling
- Years active: 2017–present

Mixed martial arts record
- Total: 16
- Wins: 10
- By knockout: 9
- By submission: 1
- Losses: 6
- By knockout: 5
- By decision: 1

Other information
- Mixed martial arts record from Sherdog

Juan Adams (born January 16, 1992) is an American mixed martial arts (MMA) fighter and currently competes in the heavyweight division. Adams is currently signed to BYB Bare Knuckle Boxing in the super heavyweight division. He formerly competed in the Ultimate Fighting Championship (UFC) and Professional Fighters League (PFL).

== Background ==
Adams was born in Houston, Texas on January 16, 1992. He played football, competed in wrestling and was an Eagle Scout during his high school years. During his senior year at Strake Jesuit College Preparatory in Houston, Adams broke his hand and failed to get a collegiate football scholarship. Thus, he turned his focus to wrestling. He was offered a scholarship from Virginia Military Institute in Lexington, Virginia. Upon graduation, he received NFL tryouts for a defensive linemen position from the Indianapolis Colts and Green Bay Packers, without success. Being 6-foot-5 and over 300 pounds, he turned his focus to MMA, since he had started training at Paradigm Training Center during his break from university in his hometown. Adams took his first amateur MMA fight after he graduated with a computer science degree. He won the fight and knew being a mixed martial artist would be his choice for his career.

== Mixed martial arts career ==
=== Early career ===
Adams began his professional MMA career in 2017 and fought in Legacy Fighting Alliance and amassed a record of 3-0 prior to competing in Dana White's Contender Series 15.

=== Dana White's Tuesday Night Contender Series ===
Adams appeared in Dana White's Contender Series 15 on July 31, 2018, facing Shawn Teed. He won the fight via technical knockout in round one and was signed by UFC.

=== Ultimate Fighting Championship ===
Adams made his UFC debut on December 15, 2018 against Chris de la Rocha at UFC on Fox 31, He won the fight via technical knockout in round three.

His next fight was on May 4, 2019 at UFC Fight Night 151 against Arjan Bhullar. He lost the fight via unanimous decision.

Adams faced Greg Hardy on July 20, 2019 at UFC on ESPN 4. He lost the fight via technical knockout in round one.

Adams faced Justin Tafa on February 8, 2020 at UFC 247. He lost the fight via knockout in the first round.

On February 12, 2020, Adams revealed he had been released from the UFC. Later it was clarified that Adams fought out his rookie contract and it was not renewed.

=== Post-UFC career ===
Adams signed with ARES Fighting Championship in late February 2020.

Despite the contract with ARES, Adams ended up facing Jeremy Hardy at Fury FC 46 on May 16, 2021. He won the fight via first-round technical knockout.

He was then scheduled to face Juan Torres at Fury FC 47 on June 20, 2021, but the fight was cancelled.

Adams faced Eric Lunsford at Fury FC 48 on July 25, 2021. He won the fight via first-round rear naked choke submission.

==== Fury FC Heavyweight Champion ====
Adams challenged Richard Odoms for the Fury FC Heavyweight Championship at Fury FC 49 on August 29, 2021, he won the fight by third round TKO.

Adams made a defence of his Fury FC Heavyweight Championship against Austen Lane at Fury FC 54 on November 21, 2021. He lost the bout and title via a 4th round TKO stoppage.

Adams faced Aaron Rosa at Fury FC 56 on February 6, 2022. Adams won the bout in the first round via ground and pound TKO.

=== Professional Fighters League ===
Adams faced Sam Kei on June 24, 2022 at PFL 5. He won the fight via TKO in the second round.

Adams, replacing Denis Goltsov, faced Matheus Scheffel in the Semifinals of the Heavyweight tournament on August 13, 2022 at PFL 8. Adams lost the bout via TKO stoppage in the third round.

=== Return to regional circuit ===
Adams was then scheduled to face Austin Green at Fury FC 78 on April 23, 2023. However, the bout was scrapped after Green withdrew from the bout citing weight issues.

Adams is now scheduled to face Shelton Graves for the inaugural Paradigm Combat Sports Heavyweight Championship at PCS 3 on June 17, 2023.

== Championships and accomplishments ==
- Fury Fighting Championship
  - Fury FC Heavyweight Championship (one time; former)

== Mixed martial arts record ==
Professional record breakdown
16 matches	10 wins	6 losses
By knockout	9	5
By submission	1	0
By decision	0	1

Res.	Record	Opponent	Method	Event	Date	Round	Time	Location	Notes
Loss	10–6	Shelton Graves	TKO (punches)	Paradigm Combat Sports 3	June 17, 2023	2	4:33	Houston, Texas, United States	For the vacant PCS Heavyweight Championship.
Loss	10–5	Matheus Scheffel	TKO (punches)	PFL 8 (2022)	August 13, 2022	3	3:45	Cardiff, Wales	2022 PFL Heavyweight Tournament Semifinal.
Win	10–4	Sam Kei	TKO (punches)	PFL 5 (2022)	June 24, 2022	2	2:30	Atlanta, Georgia, United States	
Win	9–4	Aaron Rosa	TKO (punches)	Fury FC 56	February 6, 2022	1	3:08	San Antonio, Texas, United States	
Loss	8–4	Austen Lane	TKO (punches)	Fury FC 54	November 21, 2021	4	0:43	Houston, Texas, United States	Lost the Fury FC Heavyweight Championship.
Win	8–3	Richard Odoms	TKO (punches)	Fury FC 49	August 29, 2021	3	5:00	Houston, Texas, United States	Won the Fury FC Heavyweight Championship.
Win	7–3	Eric Lunsford	Submission (rear naked choke)	Fury FC 48	July 25, 2021	1	3:27	Houston, Texas, United States	
Win	6–3	Jeremy Hardy	TKO (punches)	Fury FC 46	May 16, 2021	1	3:59	Houston, Texas, United States	
Loss	5–3	Justin Tafa	TKO (punches)	UFC 247	February 8, 2020	1	1:59	Houston, Texas, United States	
Loss	5–2	Greg Hardy	TKO (punches)	UFC on ESPN: dos Anjos vs. Edwards	July 20, 2019	1	0:45	San Antonio, Texas, United States	
Loss	5–1	Arjan Bhullar	Decision (unanimous)	UFC Fight Night: Iaquinta vs. Cowboy	May 4, 2019	3	5:00	Ottawa, Ontario, Canada	
Win	5–0	Chris de la Rocha	TKO (punches)	UFC on Fox: Lee vs. Iaquinta 2	December 15, 2018	3	0:58	Milwaukee, Wisconsin, United States	
Win	4–0	Shawn Teed	TKO (punches)	Dana White's Contender Series 15	July 31, 2018	1	4:09	Las Vegas, Nevada, United States	
Win	3–0	Dwight Gipson	TKO (submission to punches)	LFA 32	January 26, 2018	1	4:09	Lake Charles, Louisiana, United States	
Win	2–0	Brice Ritani-Coe	TKO (punches)	LFA 26	November 3, 2017	1	1:33	Houston, Texas, United States	
Win	1–0	Chris Rose	TKO (punches)	LFA 14	June 23, 2017	1	1:11	Houston, Texas, United States	

== See also ==
- List of male mixed martial artists
