= PFL 9 (2022) =

Professional Fighters League mixed martial arts event in 2022

- The poster for PFL 9
- Promotion: Professional Fighters League
- Date: August 20, 2022
- Venue: Copper Box Arena
- City: London, England

Event chronology
PFL 8	PFL 9	PFL 10

The PFL 9 mixed martial arts event for the 2022 season of the Professional Fighters League was held on August 20, 2022, at the Copper Box Arena in London, England. This was the start of the playoffs for the Women's Lightweight and Featherweight divisions.

== Background ==
This event will mark the third and final PFL playoff card, with the Women's Lightweight and Featherweight playoffs holding their semifinal bouts with the semi-finals having UFC vet Chris Wade facing Brendan Loughnane, while Ryoji Kudo facing Bubba Jenkins.

The Women's Lightweight bracket sees UFC vet Larissa Pacheco take on Olena Kolesnyk while Kayla Harrison faces Martina Jindrová in the other lightweight semifinal.

== Results ==
Main Card (ESPN/ESPN+)
Weight class				Method	Round	Time	Notes
Women's Lightweight	Kayla Harrison	def.	Martina Jindrová	Submission (arm-triangle choke)	1	3:17
Featherweight	Brendan Loughnane	def.	Chris Wade	Decision (unanimous) (30–27, 30–27, 30–27)	3	5:00
Women's Lightweight	Larissa Pacheco	def.	Olena Kolesnyk	TKO (punches)	1	2:09
Featherweight	Bubba Jenkins	def.	Ryoji Kudo	Submission (rear-naked choke)	1	1:49
Women's Flyweight	Dakota Ditcheva	def.	Hassna Gaber	TKO (submission to knee to the body)	1	0:58
Light Heavyweight	Simeon Powell	def.	João Paulo Fagundes	TKO (leg kicks)	2	1:56
Preliminary card (ESPN+)
Heavyweight	Stuart Austin	def.	Sofiane Boukichou	Decision (split) (29–28, 28–29, 30–27)	3	5:00
Lightweight	Aleksandrs Čhižhovs	def.	Omar Hussein	Submission (rear-naked choke)	2	4:12
Bantamweight	Zebenzui Ruiz	def.	Raphael Uchegbu	Decision (unanimous) (29–28, 29–28, 29–27)	3	5:00
Postliminary card (ESPN+)
Lightweight	Marcin Held	def.	Myles Price	Submission (guillotine choke)	2	2:37
Heavyweight	Abraham Bably	def.	Louie Sutherland	Decision (unanimous) (30–27, 30–27, 30–27)	3	5:00
Welterweight	Magnus Onyeka Iversen	def.	Tayo Odunjo	TKO (punches)	1	4:36
Bantamweight	Ali Taleb	def.	Darius Mafi	Technical Submission (guillotine choke)	1	1:58

== 2022 PFL Women's Lightweight playoffs ==
Semifinals
1	(Brazil) Larissa Pacheco	TKO
4	(Ukraine) Olena Kolesnyk	1
2	(United States) Kayla Harrison	SUB
3	(Czech Republic) Martina Jindrová	1

Finals
1	(Brazil) Larissa Pacheco
2	(United States) Kayla Harrison

Legend
(SD)	(Split Decision)
(UD)	(Unanimous Decision)
(MD)	(Majority Decision)
SUB	Submission
(T)KO	(Technical) Knock Out
L	Loss

== 2022 PFL Featherweight playoffs ==
Semifinals
1	(United States) Chris Wade	3
4	(England) Brendan Loughnane	DEC
2	(Japan) Ryoji Kudo	1
3	(United States) Bubba Jenkins	SUB

Finals
4	(England) Brendan Loughnane
3	(United States) Bubba Jenkins

Legend
(SD)	(Split Decision)
(UD)	(Unanimous Decision)
(MD)	(Majority Decision)
SUB	Submission
(T)KO	(Technical) Knock Out
L	Loss

== See also ==
- List of PFL events
- List of current PFL fighters
