= PFL 8 (2022) =

Professional Fighters League mixed martial arts event in 2022

- The poster for PFL 8
- Promotion: Professional Fighters League
- Date: August 13, 2022
- Venue: Cardiff Motorpoint Arena
- City: Cardiff, Wales

Event chronology
PFL 7	PFL 8	PFL 9

The PFL 8 mixed martial arts event for the 2022 season of the Professional Fighters League was held on August 13, 2022, at the Cardiff Motorpoint Arena in Cardiff, Wales. This was the start of the playoffs for the Heavyweight and Welterweight divisions.

== Background ==
This will mark the second PFL playoff card, along with being the first PFL event held outside of America. The event will mark the start of the Heavyweight and Welterweight playoffs, with UFC veteran and former Bellator champion Rory MacDonald scheduled to take on undefeated Magomed Umalatov. On the other side of the bracket, Sadibou Sy takes on Carlos Leal. The Heavyweight bracket was to see Denis Goltsov taking on 2021 PFL Champion Bruno Cappelozza, while Ante Delija faced Renan Ferreira. However after picking up an injury, Cappelozza was unable to continue in the tournament and replaced by Matheus Scheffel. After visa issues forced Umalatov and Goltsov to pull out of their respective bouts due to visa issues, they were replaced bu Dilano Taylor and Juan Adams respectively.

== Results ==
Main Card (ESPN/ESPN+)
Weight class				Method	Round	Time	Notes
Welterweight	Dilano Taylor	def.	Rory MacDonald	TKO (punches)	1	3:59
Heavyweight	Ante Delija	def.	Renan Ferreira	TKO (punches)	1	4:31
Heavyweight	Matheus Scheffel	def.	Juan Adams	TKO (punches)	3	3:45
Welterweight	Sadibou Sy	def.	Carlos Leal	Decision (unanimous) (29–27, 29–27, 29–27)	3	5:00	(Note: Leal was deducted 1 point in Round 3 due to a groin strike.)
Featherweight	Nathan Kelly	def.	Ben Ellis	Submission (rear-naked choke)	1	2:45
Preliminary card (ESPN+)
Lightweight	Josh O'Connor	def.	Emran Sakhizaada	Submission (rear-naked choke)	3	2:56
Light Heavyweight	Marcin Wójcik	def.	Mick Stanton	Submission (rear-naked choke)	1	4:04
Welterweight	Chris Mixan	def.	Christian Stigenberg	Decision (split) (29–28, 29–28, 29–28)	3	5:00
Heavyweight	Szymon Bajor	def.	Ronny Markes	Decision (unanimous) (30–27, 30–27, 29–27)	3	5:00
Postliminary card (ESPN+)
Light Heavyweight	Lee Chadwick	def.	Przemysław Mysiala	Decision (unanimous) (30–27, 29–28, 29–28)	3	5:00
Light Heavyweight	Will Fleury	def.	Anthony Salamone	Decision (unanimous) (30–25, 30–25, 30–25)	3	5:00
Lightweight	Maxim Radu	def.	Vojto Barborík	Submission (knee injury)	1	1:15
Bantamweight	Francesco Nuzzi	vs.	Moktar Benkaci	No Contest (accidental eye poke)	2	4:10

== 2022 PFL Heavyweight playoffs ==
Semifinals
6	(United States) Juan Adams*	3
7	(Brazil) Matheus Scheffel*	TKO
2	(Croatia) Ante Delija	TKO
3	(Brazil) Renan Ferreira	1

Finals
2	(Croatia) Ante Delija
7	(Brazil) Matheus Scheffel*

- Bruno Cappelozza was originally scheduled to face Denis Goltsov but was unable to continue in the tournament. He was replaced by #7 ranked Matheus Scheffel.
- Denis Goltsov was originally scheduled to face Matheus Scheffel but was unable to continue in the tournament. He was replaced by #6 ranked Juan Adams.

Legend
(SD)	(Split Decision)
(UD)	(Unanimous Decision)
(MD)	(Majority Decision)
SUB	Submission
(T)KO	(Technical) Knock Out
L	Loss

== 2022 PFL Welterweight playoffs ==
Semifinals
1	(Canada) Rory MacDonald	1
7	(United States) Dilano Taylor*	TKO
2	(Sweden) Sadibou Sy	DEC
3	(Brazil) Carlos Leal	3

Finals
2	(Sweden) Sadibou Sy
7	(United States) Dilano Taylor*

- Magomed Umalatov was originally scheduled to face Rory MacDonald but was unable to continue in the tournament. He was replaced by #7 ranked Dilano Taylor.

Legend
(SD)	(Split Decision)
(UD)	(Unanimous Decision)
(MD)	(Majority Decision)
SUB	Submission
(T)KO	(Technical) Knock Out
L	Loss

== See also ==
- List of PFL events
- List of current PFL fighters
