= PFL 7 (2022) =

Professional Fighters League MMA event in 2022

- The poster for PFL 7
- Promotion: Professional Fighters League
- Date: August 5, 2022
- Venue: Hulu Theater
- City: New York City, New York, United States

Event chronology
PFL 6	PFL 7	PFL 8

The PFL 7 mixed martial arts event for the 2022 season of the Professional Fighters League was held on August 5, 2022, at the Hulu Theater in New York City, New York, United States. This event marked the start of the playoffs for the Light Heavyweight and Lightweight divisions.

== Background ==
This event featured the semifinal bouts of the Light Heavyweight and Lightweight playoffs.

Rob Wilkinson and Delan Monte will face each other in the Light Heavyweight division. Wilkinson made his third appearance with PFL cage, going 2-0 in the regular season with a first and second round stoppages. Monte was 1-1 during the regular season in 2022. The other side of the bracket was to see two former UFC veterans, Antônio Carlos Júnior and Omari Akhmedov, face off against each other. However, Antonio suffered an ACL injury requiring surgery, sidelining him for the rest of the year and he was replaced by Josh Silveira for the playoffs.

The Lightweight bracket saw former UFC Champion Anthony Pettis take on UFC vet Stevie Ray in a rematch of their bout six weeks earlier, while Olivier Aubin-Mercier and Alex Martinez faced off in the other lightweight semifinal.

== Results ==
Main Card (ESPN)
Weight class				Method	Round	Time	Notes
Lightweight	Stevie Ray	def.	Anthony Pettis	Decision (unanimous) (29–28, 29–28, 29–28)	3	5:00
Light Heavyweight	Omari Akhmedov	def.	Josh Silveira	Decision (unanimous) (30–27, 30–27, 29–28)	3	5:00
Lightweight	Olivier Aubin-Mercier	def.	Alex Martinez	Decision (unanimous) (30–27, 30–26, 30–26)	3	5:00
Light Heavyweight	Rob Wilkinson	def.	Delan Monte	KO (knee and punches)	1	1:37
Preliminary card (ESPN+)
Welterweight	Itso Babulaidze	def.	Mahmoud Fawzy	TKO (punches)	1	4:30
Light Heavyweight	Marthin Hamlet	def.	Cory Hendricks	Decision (split) (29–28, 28–29, 29–28)	3	5:00	(Note: 2023 light heavyweight qualifier)
Postliminary card (ESPN+)
Heavyweight	Marcelo Nunes	def.	Dylan Potter	Submission (arm-triangle choke)	1	1:47	(Note: 2023 heavyweight qualifier)
Lightweight	Alexei Pergande	def.	Elvis Lebron Quiles	Decision (split) (29–28, 28–29, 29–28)	3	5:00
Lightweight	Elvin Espinoza	def.	Corey Jackson	Decision (unanimous) (30–27, 29–28, 29–28)	3	5:00	(Note: 2023 Challenger Series qualifier)
Featherweight	Brahyan Zurcher	def.	Ricardo Jimenez	Decision (unanimous) (30–27, 30–27, 30–26)	3	5:00	(Note: 2023 Challenger Series qualifier)

== 2022 PFL Light Heavyweight playoffs ==
Semifinals
1	(Australia) Rob Wilkinson	KO
4	(Brazil) Delan Monte	1
2	(Russia) Omari Akhmedov	UD
5	(United States) Josh Silveira	3

Finals
1	(Australia) Rob Wilkinson
2	(Russia) Omari Akhmedov

- Antônio Carlos Júnior was originally scheduled to face Omari Akhmedov but was unable to continue in the tournament. He was replaced by #5 ranked Josh Silveira.

Legend
(SD)	(Split Decision)
(UD)	(Unanimous Decision)
(MD)	(Majority Decision)
SUB	Submission
(T)KO	(Technical) Knock Out
L	Loss

== 2022 PFL Lightweight playoffs ==
Semifinals
1	(United States) Anthony Pettis	3
4	(Scotland) Stevie Ray	UD
2	(Canada) Olivier Aubin-Mercier	UD
3	(Paraguay) Alex Martinez	3

Finals
4	(Scotland) Stevie Ray
2	(Canada) Olivier Aubin-Mercier

Legend
(SD)	(Split Decision)
(UD)	(Unanimous Decision)
(MD)	(Majority Decision)
SUB	Submission
(T)KO	(Technical) Knock Out
L	Loss

== See also ==
- List of PFL events
- List of current PFL fighters
