= 2023 in Bellator MMA =

Mixed martial arts events

Information
- Promotion: Bellator MMA
- First date: February 4, 2023
- Last date: November 17, 2023

Events
- Total events: 13

Fights
- Total fights: 179
- Title fights: 15

2023 in Bellator MMA was the fifteenth year in the history of Bellator MMA, a mixed martial arts promotion based in the United States.

== Events list ==
#	Event	Date	Venue	City	Country	Ref.
13	Bellator 301: Amosov vs. Jackson	November 17, 2023	Wintrust Arena	Chicago, Illinois	U.S.	
12	Bellator 300: Nurmagomedov vs. Primus	October 7, 2023	Pechanga Arena	San Diego, California	U.S.	
11	Bellator 299: Eblen vs. Edwards	September 23, 2023	3Arena	Dublin	Ireland	
10	Bellator 298: Storley vs. Ward	August 11, 2023	Sanford Pentagon	Sioux Falls, South Dakota	U.S.	
9	Bellator MMA x Rizin 2	July 30, 2023	Saitama Super Arena	Saitama	Japan	
8	Bellator 297: Nemkov vs. Romero	June 16, 2023	Wintrust Arena	Chicago, Illinois	U.S.	
7	Bellator 296: Mousasi vs. Edwards	May 12, 2023	Accor Arena	Paris	France	
6	Bellator 295: Stots vs. Mix	April 22, 2023	Neal S. Blaisdell Arena	Honolulu, Hawaii	U.S.	
5	Bellator 294: Carmouche vs. Bennett 2	April 21, 2023	Neal S. Blaisdell Arena	Honolulu, Hawaii	U.S.	
4	Bellator 293: Golm vs. James	March 31, 2023	Pechanga Resort and Casino	Temecula, California	U.S.	
3	Bellator 292: Nurmagomedov vs. Henderson	March 10, 2023	SAP Center	San Jose, California	U.S.	
2	Bellator 291: Amosov vs. Storley 2	February 25, 2023	3Arena	Dublin	Ireland	
1	Bellator 290: Bader vs. Fedor 2	February 4, 2023	Kia Forum	Inglewood, California	U.S.	

== Bellator Lightweight World Grand Prix Tournament ==
On September 28, 2022, Bellator president Scott Coker revealed in a The MMA Hour interview that a Lightweight World Grand Prix will take place in 2023. On January 11, 2023, during an appearance on "The MMA Hour," Bellator president Scott Coker revealed the fighters taking part in the tournament. The lineup includes Usman Nurmagomedov, A.J. McKee, Tofiq Musayev, Alexandr Shabliy, Patricky Freire, Mansour Barnaoui, Benson Henderson, and Sidney Outlaw. The tournament kicked off at Bellator 292 on March 10 in San Jose, California.

Quarter-finals
(Russia) Usman Nurmagomedov (c)	SUB
(United States) Benson Henderson	1
(France) Mansour Barnaoui	5
(United States) Brent Primus (Note: Primus replaced Sidney Outlaw after he was suspended for a positive drug test.)	UD
(Azerbaijan) Tofiq Musayev	3
(Russia) Alexandr Shabliy	TKO
(Brazil) Roberto de Souza (Note: de Souza replaced A. J. McKee after he withdrew due to medical issues. The bout took place at catchweight of 161 pounds.)	3
(Brazil) Patricky Pitbull	TKO

Semi-finals
(Russia) Usman Nurmagomedov (c) (Note: Nurmagomedov's win was later overturned to a No Contest after he tested positive for a banned substance in a prescription drug. He was not stripped of the title due to the unintentional ingestion of the substance, but did receive a suspension.)	UD
(United States) Brent Primus	5
(Russia) Alexandr Shabliy	UD
(Brazil) Patricky Pitbull	5

Final
(Russia) Alexandr Shabliy (Note: The conclusion to the tournament was cancelled following the acquisition of Bellator MMA by Professional Fighters League in November 2023. Shabliy and Nurmagomedov did however eventually face each other the next year in a Lightweight Title bout at Bellator Champions Series 4, where Nurmagomedov won by unanimous decision.)

== Bellator Bantamweight World Grand Prix Tournament ==
The eight participants of the tournament were revealed on December 3, 2021. They include current champion Sergio Pettis, the former Rizin and Bellator champion Kyoji Horiguchi, another former Bellator champion in Juan Archuleta, who captured the vacant bantamweight title in 2020 against Patchy Mix, who will also be in the tournament. The final four fighters in the Grand Prix are all ranked in the top six by Bellator at 135 pounds: Magomed Magomedov, James Gallagher, Raufeon Stots and Leandro Higo. Pettis and Gallagher would eventually pull out due to injuries requiring surgery. Due to the pull outs, two wild card qualifier bouts between Josh Hill and Enrique Barzola, with the winner meeting Magomed Magomedov in the opening round, and the second qualifier between Jornel Lugo and Danny Sabatello, which will have the winner face Leandro Higo in the first round of the tournament. Due to Covid, Hill had to pull out of the bout and was replaced by Nikita Mikhailov.

Wild Cards
(United States) Danny Sabatello	UD
(United States) Jornel Lugo	3
(Peru) Enrique Barzola	UD
(Russia) Nikita Mikhailov	3

Quarter-finals
(United States) Juan Archuleta	3
(United States) Raufeon Stots	KO
(Brazil) Leandro Higo	5
(United States) Danny Sabatello	UD
(Russia) Magomed Magomedov	SUB
(Peru) Enrique Barzola	4
(United States) Patchy Mix	UD
(Japan) Kyoji Horiguchi	5

Semi-finals
(United States) Raufeon Stots (ic)	SD
(United States) Danny Sabatello	5
(Russia) Magomed Magomedov	2
(United States) Patchy Mix	SUB

Final
(United States) Raufeon Stots (ic)	1
(United States) Patchy Mix	KO

== Title fights ==
Title fights in 2023
Weight class				Method	Round	Time	Event	Notes
Middleweight	Johnny Eblen (c)	def.	Anatoly Tokov	Decision (unanimous) (50–45, 49–46, 49–46)	5	5:00	Bellator 290	(Note: For the Bellator Middleweight World Championship.)
Heavyweight	Ryan Bader (c)	def.	Fedor Emelianenko	TKO (punches)	1	2:30	Bellator 290	(Note: For the Bellator Heavyweight World Championship.)
Welterweight	Yaroslav Amosov (c)	def.	Logan Storley (ic)	Decision (unanimous) (50–45, 50–45, 50–45)	5	5:00	Bellator 291	(Note: For the Bellator Welterweight World Championship.)
Lightweight	Usman Nurmagomedov (c)	def.	Benson Henderson	Submission (rear-naked choke)	1	2:37	Bellator 292	(Note: For the Bellator Lightweight World Championship.)
Women's Flyweight	Liz Carmouche (c)	def.	DeAnna Bennett	Submission (arm-triangle choke)	4	4:29	Bellator 294	(Note: For the Bellator Women's Flyweight World Championship.)
Bantamweight	Patchy Mix	def.	Raufeon Stots (ic)	KO (knee)	1	1:20	Bellator 295	(Note: For the interim Bellator Bantamweight World Championship.)
Bantamweight	Sergio Pettis (c)	def.	Patrício Pitbull	Decision (unanimous) (49–46, 50–45, 50–45)	5	5:00	Bellator 297	(Note: For the Bellator Bantamweight World Championship.)
Light Heavyweight	Vadim Nemkov (c)	def.	Yoel Romero	Decision (unanimous) (49–46, 49–46, 49–46)	5	5:00	Bellator 297	(Note: For the Bellator Light Heavyweight World Championship)
Flyweight	Kyoji Horiguchi	vs.	Makoto Takahashi	No Contest (accidental eye poke)	1	0:25	Bellator MMA x Rizin 2	(Note: For the inaugural Bellator Flyweight World Championship. Accidental eye poke rendered Takahashi unable to continue.)
Middleweight	Johnny Eblen (c)	def.	Fabian Edwards	KO (punches)	3	0:21	Bellator 299	(Note: For the Bellator Middleweight World Championship.)
Women's Flyweight	Liz Carmouche (c)	def.	Ilima-Lei Macfarlane	TKO (leg kick)	5	0:17	Bellator 300	(Note: For the Bellator Women's Flyweight World Championship.)
Women's Featherweight	Cris Cyborg (c)	def.	Cat Zingano	TKO (punches)	1	4:01	Bellator 300	(Note: For the Bellator Women's Featherweight World Championship.)
Lightweight	Usman Nurmagomedov (c)	vs.	Brent Primus	No Contest (overturned)	5	5:00	Bellator 300	(Note: For the Bellator Lightweight World Championship. Originally a unanimous decision win for Nurmagomedov; overturned after he tested positive for a banned substance.)
Bantamweight	Patchy Mix (ic)	def.	Sergio Pettis (c)	Submission (rear-naked choke)	2	1:51	Bellator 301	(Note: For the Bellator Bantamweight World Championship.)
Welterweight	Jason Jackson	def.	Yaroslav Amosov (c)	KO (punches)	3	2:08	Bellator 301	(Note: For the Bellator Welterweight World Championship.)

== See also ==
- List of Bellator events
- List of current Bellator fighters
- 2023 in combat sports
- 2023 in UFC
- 2023 in ONE Championship
- 2023 in Absolute Championship Akhmat
- 2023 in Konfrontacja Sztuk Walki
- 2023 in Rizin Fighting Federation
- 2023 in AMC Fight Nights
- 2023 in Brave Combat Federation
- 2023 in Road FC
- 2023 in Professional Fighters League
