= Sahel (disambiguation) =

Sahel is an ecoclimatic and biogeographic transition zone in Africa.

Sahel may also refer to:

== Common uses ==
- Sahel (given name), a feminine given name

== Geographic ==
- Sahel (Eritrea), a town
- Sahel, Larache, a town in Morocco
- Sahel, Mali, a commune
- Sahel, Tunisia, a region of that country
- Arbaa Sahel, a town in Morocco
- Khemis Sahel, a town in Morocco
- Maten al-Sahel, a village in Syria
- Oulad Hriz Sahel, a town in Morocco
- Sahel Borj, a village in Iran
- Sahel Oulad H'Riz, a town in Morocco
- Sahel Region, of Burkina Faso
- Sahel River, a river in Algeria
- Sahel Selim, a city in Egypt
- Northern coast of Egypt (or simply El Sahel), Egypt

== Sports ==
- Sahel SC (Kuwait), a Kuwaiti football club
- Sahel SC, a Nigerien football club
- Sahel FC, a Cameroonian football club
- Étoile du Sahel, a Tunisian sports club
- Shabab Al-Sahel, a Lebanese football club
- Al-Sahel FC, a Saudi football club
- Al-Sahel SC, a Syrian football club

== Politics ==
- Alliance of Sahel States, an alliance of Sahel states

== Other uses ==
- Omran Sahel, an Iranian company
- Voix du Sahel, a national radio station of Niger
- Mostapha Sahel (1946–2012), Moroccan politician

== See also ==
- Sahil (name)
- Sohel (disambiguation)
