= Sahil =

Sahil may refer to:

- Sahil, Azerbaijan, a municipality in Baku, Azerbaijan
- Sahil (Baku Metro), a metro station of the Baku Metro
- Sahil, Saudi Arabia, a city in the governorate of Bareq, Saudi Arabia
- Sahil, Somaliland, a region of Somaliland
- Sahil (name), a male given name (including a list of people with the name)
  - Saahil, alternative form
- Sahil (film), a 1959 Indian film
- Sahil (scorpion), a scorpion genus in the family Buthidae
