= Sohil =

Sohil is a name used across india.

Often « Sohil and Soheil » get confused but both the words are totally different. « Sohil » is commonly used in India.

As a variant spelling of Sohail, it refers to Canopus, the second brightest star in the Sky.

== See also ==
- Suhail
- Sahil (disambiguation)
- Sohan
