= Bellator 301 =

2023 mixed martial arts event

Bellator 301: Amosov vs. Jackson
- The poster for Bellator 301: Amosov vs. Jackson
- Promotion: Bellator MMA
- Date: November 17, 2023
- Venue: Wintrust Arena
- City: Chicago, Illinois, United States

Event chronology
Bellator 300: Nurmagomedov vs. Primus	Bellator 301: Amosov vs. Jackson	PFL vs. Bellator

Bellator 301: Amosov vs. Jackson was a mixed martial arts event produced by Bellator MMA that took place on November 17, 2023, at the Wintrust Arena in Chicago, Illinois, United States. The event marked the final event to air on Showtime, and also the final event before Bellator MMA was officially acquired by competitor organization the Professional Fighters League.

== Background ==
The event marked the promotion's sixth visit to Chicago and the second in 2023 since Bellator 297 in June.

A Bellator Welterweight World Championship bout between current champion Yaroslav Amosov and former LFA Welterweight Champion Jason Jackson headlined the event.

A Bellator Bantamweight World Championship unification bout between current champion Sergio Pettis and interim champion Patchy Mix (also Bellator Bantamweight World Grand Prix winner) served as the co-main event.

A Bellator Lightweight World Grand Prix semifinal bout between former champion Patricky Pitbull and Alexandr Shabliy took place at the event.

A bantamweight rematch between Raufeon Stots and Danny Sabatello also took place at the event. The pairing previously met at Bellator 289 in December 2022, which Stots won via split decision.

The week of the event, the women's flyweight bout between Juliana Velasquez and Paula Cristina and a heavyweight bout between Daniel James and Ali Isaev were cancelled.

At weigh ins, Keri Taylor-Melendez weighed in at 126.6 pounds, .6 pounds over the flyweight limit. The bout proceeded at catchweight and Taylor-Melendez was fined a percentage of her purse which went to Sengül.

A heavyweight bout between Tyrell Fortune and Marcelo Golm was planned for the event. Despite both men weighing in, the bout was cancelled the night of the event after Fourtune became ill backstage.

== Results ==
Main Card (Showtime)
Weight class				Method	Round	Time	Notes
Welterweight	Jason Jackson	def.	Yaroslav Amosov (c)	KO (punches)	3	2:08	(Note: For the Bellator Welterweight World Championship)
Bantamweight	Patchy Mix (ic)	def.	Sergio Pettis (c)	Submission (rear-naked choke)	2	1:51	(Note: For the Bellator Bantamweight World Championship.)
Bantamweight	Raufeon Stots	def.	Danny Sabatello	Decision (unanimous) (29–28, 29–28, 29–28)	3	5:00
Lightweight	A. J. McKee	def.	Sidney Outlaw	Decision (unanimous) (30–27, 30–27, 30–27)	3	5:00
Lightweight	Alexandr Shabliy	def.	Patricky Pitbull	Decision (unanimous) (50–45, 50–45, 50–45)	5	5:00	(Note: Bellator Lightweight World Grand Prix Semi-final.)
Preliminary card (Youtube/Pluto TV)
Lightweight	Archie Colgan	def.	Pieter Buist	Decision (unanimous) (30–27, 30–27, 30–27)	3	5:00
Women's Flyweight	Denise Kielholtz	def.	Sumiko Inaba	Decision (unanimous) (30–27, 30–27, 30–27)	3	5:00
Featherweight	Timur Khizriev	def.	Justin Gonzales	Decision (unanimous) (30–27, 30–27, 30–27)	3	5:00
Women's Flyweight	Keri Taylor-Melendez	def.	Sabriye Şengül	Submission (guillotine choke)	2	2:06	(Note: Taylor-Melendez missed weight (126.6 lb))
Bantamweight	Matheus Mattos	def.	Richard Palencia	Submission (rear-naked choke)	2	3:20
Welterweight	Ramazan Kuramagomedov	def.	Randall Wallace	Submission (rear-naked choke)	2	3:49
Catchweight (160 lb)	Islam Mamedov	def.	Killys Mota	Decision (split) (29–28, 28–29, 29–28)	3	5:00
Featherweight	Cody Law	def.	Jefferson Pontes	Decision (unanimous) (30–27, 30–27, 30–27)	3	5:00
Lightweight	Tim Wilde	def.	Mike Hamel	KO (head kick and punches)	3	2:47
Featherweight	Yves Landu	def.	Isao Kobayashi	Decision (split) (30–27, 30–27, 28-29)	3	5:00

== See also ==
- 2023 in Bellator MMA
- List of Bellator MMA events
- List of current Bellator fighters
