= Bafarara =

- Village
- Location in Mali
- Coordinates: 15°22′34″N 11°28′26″W
- Country: Mali
- Region: Kayes Region
- Cercle: Kayes Cercle
- Commune: Sahel
- Time zone: UTC+0 (GMT)

Bafarara is a village and principal settlement (chef-lieu) of the commune of Sahel in the Cercle of Kayes in the Kayes Region of south-western Mali.
