= Bellator 296 =

Bellator mixed martial arts event in 2023

Bellator 296: Mousasi vs. Edwards
- The poster for Bellator 296: Mousasi vs. Edwards
- Promotion: Bellator MMA
- Date: May 12, 2023
- Venue: Accor Arena
- City: Paris, France

Event chronology
Bellator 295: Stots vs. Mix	Bellator 296: Mousasi vs. Edwards	Bellator 297: Nemkov vs. Romero

Bellator 296: Mousasi vs. Edwards (also known as Bellator Paris) was a mixed martial arts event produced by Bellator MMA that took place on May 12, 2023, at Accor Arena in Paris, France.

== Background ==
The event marked the promotion's third visit to Paris and first since Bellator 280 in May 2022.

A middleweight title eliminator bout between former two-time Bellator Middleweight Champion Gegard Mousasi and Fabian Edwards headlined the event.

A Bellator Lightweight World Grand Prix quarterfinal bout between Mansour Barnaoui and Sidney Outlaw was scheduled to serve as the co-main event. However at the end of February, Outlaw tested positive for banned substances and was suspended, and was replaced by former Bellator Lightweight Champion Brent Primus.

A bantamweight bout between Brett Johns and Marcirley Alves, as well a middleweight bout between Gregory Babene and Kyle Stewart were scheduled for this event. However, the week of the event, Johns pulled out due to staph infection and Stewart was not approved by the commission due to his partial myopia.

At weigh-ins, Steven Hill weighed in at 174.8 pounds for his fight against Nicolo Solli – 3.8 pounds over the welterweight non-title bout limit, leading to Solli to refusing to accept the bout. Romain Debienne weighed in at 172.4 lbs, 1.4 pounds over the limit, and was fined a percentage of his purse which went to his opponent.

== Results ==
Main card (Showtime)
Weight class				Method	Round	Time	Notes
Middleweight	Fabian Edwards	def.	Gegard Mousasi	Decision (unanimous) (49–46, 49–46, 49–46)	5	5:00	(Note: Bellator Middleweight title eliminator.)
Lightweight	Brent Primus	def.	Mansour Barnaoui	Decision (unanimous) (48–47, 48–47, 48–47)	5	5:00	(Note: Bellator Lightweight World Grand Prix Quarter-Final bout.)
Middleweight	Douglas Lima	def.	Costello van Steenis	Decision (unanimous) (29–28, 29–28, 29–28)	3	5:00
Lightweight	Thibault Gouti	def.	Kane Mousah	KO (punch)	2	3:58
Preliminary card (Youtube/Pluto TV)
Women's Flyweight	Denise Kielholtz	def.	Paula Cristina	Decision (unanimous) (29–28, 30–27, 30–27)	3	5:00
Welterweight	Luca Poclit	def.	Oliver Enkamp	Decision (unanimous) (30–27, 29–28, 29–28)	3	5:00
Lightweight	Saul Rogers	vs.	Davy Gallon	No Contest (overturned)	1	2:12	(Note: Originally a Submission (D'Arce choke) victory for Rogers. Overturned due to referee error on stoppage.)
Featherweight	Yves Landu	def.	Piotr Niedzielski	Decision (unanimous) (29–28, 29–28, 29–28)	3	5:00
Catchweight (141 lb)	Sarvarjon Khamidov	def.	Kevin Petshi	Submission (rear-naked choke)	3	1:33
Lightweight	Tim Wilde	def.	Chris Gonzalez	Decision (unanimous) (29–28, 30–27, 30–27)	3	5:00
Featherweight	Fabacary Diatta	def.	Keir Harvie	Decision (unanimous) (30–27, 30–27, 30–26)	3	5:00
Catchweight (150 lb)	Asaël Adjoudj	def.	Georges Sasu	Decision (unanimous) (29–28, 29–28, 29–27)	3	5:00
Welterweight	Romain Debienne	def.	Bourama Camara	KO (punches)	2	1:04	(Note: Debienne missed weight (172.4 lb).)
Light Heavyweight	José Augusto Azevedo	def.	Simon Biyong	Decision (unanimous) (30–27, 29–28, 30–27)	3	5:00

== See also ==
- 2023 in Bellator MMA
- List of Bellator MMA events
- List of current Bellator fighters
