= Bellator 261 =

Bellator mixed martial arts event in 2021

Bellator 261: Johnson vs. Moldavsky
- The poster for Bellator 261: Johnson vs. Moldavsky
- Promotion: Bellator MMA
- Date: June 25, 2021
- Venue: Mohegan Sun Arena
- City: Uncasville, Connecticut, United States

Event chronology
Bellator 260: Lima vs. Amosov	Bellator 261: Johnson vs. Moldavsky	Bellator 262: Velasquez vs. Kielholtz

Bellator 261: Johnson vs. Moldavsky was a mixed martial arts event produced by Bellator MMA that took place on June 25, 2021, at Mohegan Sun Arena in Uncasville, Connecticut.

== Background ==
With current heavyweight champion Ryan Bader moving on in the Bellator Light Heavyweight World Grand Prix Tournament, Timothy Johnson and Valentin Moldavsky competed for an Bellator Interim Heavyweight World Championship.

A title eliminator women's flyweight bout between Liz Carmouche and Kana Watanabe served as the co-main of the event.

A light heavyweight bout between Christian Edwards and Ben Parrish was scrapped after weigh-ins at Bellator 259 after Edwards wasn't cleared to compete by the Mohegan Sun Athletic Commission. After being cleared by a commission doctor on May 26, 2021, the bout was rebooked for this event.

The reigning WBC Muaythai World Featherweight champion Lena Ovchynnikova was scheduled to fight Kyra Batara in the event prelims. However, the bout was cancelled the week of the event with one of Batara's corner testing positive for COVID-19.

A featherweight bout between Keoni Diggs and two-time Bellator Featherweight title challenger Daniel Weichel was announced for the main card.

A middleweight bout between Taylor Johnson and Lance Wright was to take place at Bellator 260. However, a week before the event it was announced that it was moved to this event.

Light heavyweight bouts between Simon Biyong and Lee Chadwick and Christian Edwards and Ben Parrish were scheduled for this show. However, Chadwick tested positive for COVID-19 and Parrish had to pull out of the bout, so Biyong and Edwards were matched with each other.

== Results ==
Main Card (Showtime)
Weight class				Method	Round	Time	Notes
Heavyweight	Valentin Moldavsky	def.	Timothy Johnson	Decision (unanimous) (50–45, 49–46, 49–46)	5	5:00	(Note: For the interim Bellator Heavyweight World Championship.)
Women's Flyweight	Liz Carmouche	def.	Kana Watanabe	TKO (punches)	1	0:35
Lightweight	Sidney Outlaw	def.	Myles Jury	Submission (rear-naked choke)	3	4:44
Featherweight	Daniel Weichel	def.	Keoni Diggs	Decision (split) (29–28, 28–29, 30–27)	3	5:00
Light Heavyweight	Christian Edwards	def.	Simon Biyong	Decision (unanimous) (30–27, 30–27, 30–27)	3	5:00
Preliminary card (Youtube/Pluto TV)
Featherweight	John de Jesus	def.	John Macapá	Decision (split) (28–29, 29–28, 29–28)	3	5:00
Middleweight	Taylor Johnson	def.	Lance Wright	Submission (rear-naked choke)	1	2:58
Bantamweight	Jaylon Bates	def.	Cody Matthews	Submission (armbar)	2	4:04
Lightweight	Corey Samuels	def.	Isaiah Hokit	KO (punches)	1	0:10
Lightweight	Søren Bak	def.	Bobby Lee	Decision (unanimous) (30–26, 29–27, 29–27)	3	5:00

== See also ==
- 2021 in Bellator MMA
- List of Bellator MMA events
- List of current Bellator fighters
