= Bellator 295 =

Mixed martial arts event in 2022

Bellator 295: Stots vs. Mix
- The poster for Bellator 295: Stots vs. Mix
- Promotion: Bellator MMA
- Date: April 22, 2023
- Venue: Neal S. Blaisdell Arena
- City: Honolulu, Hawaii, United States

Event chronology
Bellator 294: Carmouche vs. Bennett 2	Bellator 295: Stots vs. Mix	Bellator 296: Mousasi vs. Edwards

Bellator 295: Stots vs. Mix was a mixed martial arts event produced by Bellator MMA that took place on April 22, 2023, at the Neal S. Blaisdell Arena in Honolulu, Hawaii, United States.

== Background ==
An interim Bellator Bantamweight World Championship bout and the final of the $1 million Bellator Bantamweight World Grand Prix Tournament between interim champion Raufeon Stots and former title challenger Patchy Mix headlined the event.

A women's flyweight bout between former Bellator Women's Flyweight Champion Ilima-Lei Macfarlane and Kana Watanabe was the co-main event.

A featherweight bout between Aaron Pico and Otto Rodrigues was scheduled for this event. However, Rodrigues had to pull out with injury in early April and was replaced by James Gonzalez.

At weigh-ins, Ray Borg and Keoni Diggs experienced weight management issues and were unable to weigh-in, with both their bouts; a flyweight one against Kyoji Horiguchi for Borg and a featherweight one against Weber Almerida for Diggs being scrapped. Both Borg and Diggs were subsequently released from the promotion.

== Results ==
Main Card (Showtime)
Weight class				Method	Round	Time	Notes
Bantamweight	Patchy Mix	def.	Raufeon Stots (ic)	KO (knee)	1	1:20	(Note: Bellator Bantamweight World Grand Prix Tournament Final bout for the interim Bellator Bantamweight World Championship and $1 million prize.)
Women's Flyweight	Ilima-Lei Macfarlane	def.	Kana Watanabe	Decision (split) (29–28, 28–29, 29–28)	3	5:00
Catchweight (165 lbs)	Yancy Medeiros	vs.	Charlie Leary	NC (overturned)	1	4:39	(Note: Originally a Submission (rear-naked choke) win for Medeiros; overturned after he tested positive for a banned substance.)
Featherweight	Aaron Pico	def.	James Gonzalez	Decision (unanimous) (30–27, 30–27, 30–27)	3	5:00
Preliminary card (Youtube/Pluto TV)
Featherweight	Mads Burnell	def.	Justin Gonzales	Decision (unanimous) (30–27, 30–27, 30–27)	3	5:00
Featherweight	Kai Kamaka III	def.	Adli Edwards	Decision (unanimous) (30–27, 30–27, 30–27)	3	5:00
Women's Flyweight	Sumiko Inaba	def.	Veta Arteaga	Decision (unanimous) (30–27, 30–27, 30–27)	3	5:00
Lightweight	Aalon Cruz	def.	Bobby King	Decision (unanimous) (29–28, 29–28, 30–27)	3	5:00
Heavyweight	Davion Franklin	def.	Kasim Aras	Decision (unanimous) (29–28, 29–28, 29–28)	3	5:00
Women's Flyweight	Bruna Ellen	def.	Ilara Joanne	Decision (unanimous) (29–28, 29–28, 29–28)	3	5:00
Welterweight	Masayuki Kikuiri	def.	Alexey Shurkevich	KO (punch)	2	4:33

== See also ==
- 2023 in Bellator MMA
- List of Bellator MMA events
- List of current Bellator fighters
