= Bellator 300 =

MMA event

Bellator 300: Nurmagomedov vs. Primus
- The poster for Bellator 300: Nurmagomedov vs. Primus
- Promotion: Bellator MMA
- Date: October 7, 2023
- Venue: Pechanga Arena
- City: San Diego, California, United States

Event chronology
Bellator 299: Eblen vs. Edwards	Bellator 300: Nurmagomedov vs. Primus	Bellator 301: Amosov vs. Jackson

Bellator 300: Nurmagomedov vs. Primus was a mixed martial arts event produced by Bellator MMA, that took place on October 7, 2023, at Pechanga Arena in San Diego, California, United States

== Background ==
The event marked the promotion's second visit to San Diego and first since Bellator 131 in November 2014.

A Bellator Heavyweight World Championship bout between current champion Ryan Bader and Linton Vassell was expected to headline the event. The pairing had previously met at Bellator 186 in a Bellator Light Heavyweight World Championship bout in November 2017, where defending champion Bader won by second-round TKO. However, Vassell withdrew due to illness and the bout was cancelled. As a result, a Bellator Lightweight World Grand Prix semifinal bout for the Bellator Lightweight World Championship between current champion Usman Nurmagomedov and former champion Brent Primus that was already scheduled to be on the card was promoted to be the new main event.

A Bellator Women's Featherweight World Championship bout between current champion Cris Cyborg (also former Strikeforce, Invicta FC and UFC Women's Featherweight Champions) and Cat Zingano served as the co-main event.

A Bellator Women's Flyweight World Championship bout between current champion Liz Carmouche and former champion Ilima-Lei Macfarlane completed the triad of title fights. However at the weigh-ins, Macfarlane came in at 126.6 lb (after coming in at 127.4 lb in her first attempt), 1.6 pounds over the women's flyweight limit for a title fight. The commission gave her an additional hour to cut weight, but Macfarlane came in at 128.2 lb. As a result, the bout will proceed as a one way title bout, where in the event that Macfarlane wins the fight, she would be ineligible for the championship and the title would be left vacant, while if Carmouche wins it would still count as a title defense.

== Results ==
Main Card (Showtime/Paramount+)
Weight class				Method	Round	Time	Notes
Lightweight	Usman Nurmagomedov (c)	vs	Brent Primus	NC (overturned)	5	5:00	(Note: Bellator Lightweight World Grand Prix Semifinal for the Bellator Lightweight World Championship; originally a unanimous decision win for Nurmagomedov, overturned after he tested positive for a banned substance.)
Women's Featherweight	Cris Cyborg (c)	def.	Cat Zingano	TKO (punches)	1	4:01	(Note: For the Bellator Women's Featherweight World Championship.)
Women's Flyweight	Liz Carmouche (c)	def.	Ilima-Lei Macfarlane	TKO (leg kick)	5	0:17	(Note: For the Bellator Women's Flyweight World Championship. Macfarlane missed weight (126.6 lbs) and was ineligible for the title.)
Preliminary card (Youtube/Pluto TV)
Catchweight (138 lb)	Bobby Seronio III	def.	Alberto Garcia	Decision (unanimous) (30–27, 30–27, 30–27)	3	5:00
Women's Featherweight	Leah McCourt	def.	Sara McMann	TKO (punches)	1	4:30
Lightweight	Sergio Cossio	def.	Jesse Roberts	Submission (triangle choke)	3	4:05
Featherweight	Kai Kamaka III	def.	Henry Corrales	Decision (split) (30–27, 28–29, 29–28)	3	5:00
Heavyweight	Slim Trabelsi	def.	Davion Franklin	TKO (leg injury)	1	3:19
Light Heavyweight	Dovletdzhan Yagshimuradov	def.	Maciej Różański	Decision (unanimous) (30–27, 29–28, 29–28)	3	5:00
Catchweight (180 lb)	Mukhamed Berkhamov	def.	Herman Terrado	Decision (unanimous) (30–27, 30–27, 30–27)	3	5:00
Middleweight	Grant Neal	def.	Romero Cotton	Decision (unanimous) (30–27, 29–28, 29–28)	3	5:00
Women's Flyweight	Jena Bishop	def.	Ilara Joanne	Submission (armbar)	1	2:45
Heavyweight	Josh Hokit	def.	Spencer Smith	Submission (arm-triangle choke)	3	3:48
Postliminary card (Youtube)
Women's Featherweight	Jackie Cataline	def.	Lorrany Santos	Decision (unanimous) (30–27, 30–27, 30–26)	3	5:00
Catchweight (160 lb)	Dmytrii Hrytsenko	def.	Justin Montalvo	Decision (unanimous) (29–28, 29–28, 29–28)	3	5:00
Bantamweight	Bryce Meredith	def.	Miguel Peimbert	Decision (unanimous) (30–26, 30–27, 30–27)	3	5:00

== Reported payout ==
The following is the reported payout to the fighters as reported to the California State Athletic Commission. The amounts do not include sponsor money, discretionary bonuses, viewership points, or additional earnings.

- Usman Nurmagomedov ($150,000 + no win bonus = $150,000) def. Brent Primus ($150,000)
- Cris Cyborg ($300,000 + no win bonus = $300,000) def. Cat Zingano ($150,000)
- Liz Carmouche ($150,000 + no win bonus = $150,000) def. Ilima-Lei Macfarlane ($150,000)
- Bobby Seronio III ($4,000 + $4,000 = $8,000) vs. Alberto Garcia ($2,000)
- Leah McCourt ($30,000 + $30,000 = $60,000) def. Sara McMann ($30,000)
- Sergio Cossio ($30,000 + $30,000 = $60,000) vs. Jesse Roberts ($12,000)
- Kai Kamaka III ($38,000 + $38,000 = $76,000) def. Henry Corrales ($50,000)
- Slim Trabelsi ($60,000 + no win bonus = $60,000) def. Davion Franklin ($75,000)
- Dovletdzhan Yagshimuradov ($50,000 + $50,000 = $100,000) def. Maciej Rozanski ($23,000)
- Mukhamed Berkhamov ($33,000 + $33,000 = $66,000) vs. Herman Terrado ($22,000)
- Grant Neal ($30,000 + $30,000 = $60,000) def. Romero Cotton ($50,000)
- Jena Bishop ($28,000 + $28,000 = $56,000) def. Ilara Joanne ($23,000)
- Josh Hokit ($5,000 + $5,000 = $10,000) def. Spencer Smith ($5,000)
- Dmytrii Hrytsenko ($13,000 + $13,000 = $26,000) def. Justin Montalvo ($10,000)
- Bryce Meredith ($7,500 + no win bonus = $7,500) def. Miguel Peimbert ($4,000)
- Jackie Cataline ($5,000 + $5,000 = $10,000) def. Lorrany Santos ($35,000)

== Fight night weights ==
The following is the official weigh-in weights compared to the fight night weights reported by the California State Athletic Commission.

- Usman Nurmagomedov: 154.8 to 173.2 pounds (12%)
- Renato Moicano: 154.8 to 180.6 pounds (17%)
- Cris Cyborg: 144.6 to 163.4 pounds (13%)
- Cat Zingano: 144.6 to 146.4 pounds (1%)
- Liz Carmouche: 124.8 to 146.0 pounds (17%)
- Ilima-Lei Macfarlane: 126.6 to 140.4 pounds (11%)
- Bobby Seronio III: 138.2 to 147.6 pounds (7%)
- Alberto Garcia: 137.6 to 153.4 pounds (11%)
- Leah McCourt: 146.0 to 155.6 pounds (7%)
- Sara McMann: 145.4 to 147.6 pounds (2%)
- Sergio Cossio: 156.0 to 176.0 pounds (13%)
- Jesse Roberts: 155.8 to 174.2 pounds (12%)
- Kai Kamaka III: 145.6 to 163.4 pounds (12%)
- Henry Corrales: 146.0 to 171.4 pounds (17%)
- Slim Trabelsi: 233.8 to 233.4 pounds (0%)
- Davion Franklin: 265.0 to 284.0 pounds (7%)
- Dovletdzhan Yagshimuradov: 205.4 to 221.6 pounds (8%)
- Maciej Rozanski: 204.4 to 217.0 pounds (6%)
- Mukhamed Berkhamov: 178.4 to 191.4 pounds (7%)
- Herman Terrado: 178.2 to 191.4 pounds (7%)
- Grant Neal: 183.6 to 202.2 pounds (10%)
- Romero Cotton: 185.6 to 203.4 pounds (10%)
- Jena Bishop: 125.4 to 135.4 pounds (8%)
- Ilara Joanne: 125.6 to 136.0 pounds (8%)
- Josh Hokit: 246.0 to 247.0 pounds (0%)
- Spencer Smith: 247.8 to 250.6 pounds (1%)
- Dmytrii Hrytsenko: 158.8 to 170.6 pounds (7%)
- Justin Montalvo: 158.6 to 176.8 pounds (11%)
- Bryce Meredith: 136.0 to 153.2 pounds (13%)
- Miguel Peimbert: 134.8 to 149.0 pounds (11%)
- Jackie Cataline: 145.4 to 148.6 pounds (2%)
- Lorrany Santos: 145.6 to 163.8 pounds (13%)

== Aftermath ==
The result of the Usman Nurmagomedov and Brent Primus bout was overturned by CSAC when Nurmagomedov tested positive for a prescription drug that contained a banned substance. He was suspended for 6 months, however due to the accidental nature of the ingestion, he was not stripped of the title.

== See also ==
- 2023 in Bellator MMA
- List of Bellator MMA events
- List of current Bellator fighters
