= Kana Watanabe =

Japanese mixed martial artist

- Born: 渡辺華奈; August 21, 1988 (age 38); Tokyo, Japan
- Other names: Too macho YAWARA-chan, Soft Beast
- Height: 5 ft 6 in (1.68 m)
- Weight: 125 lb (57 kg; 8 st 13 lb)
- Division: Flyweight
- Reach: 66 in (168 cm)
- Style: Judo
- Stance: Orthodox
- Fighting out of: Tokyo, Japan
- Team: Fighter's Flow
- Rank: 4th dan black belt in Judo
- Years active: 2017–present

Mixed martial arts record
- Total: 19
- Wins: 13
- By knockout: 3
- By submission: 4
- By decision: 6
- Losses: 5
- By knockout: 2
- By submission: 1
- By decision: 2
- Draws: 1

Other information
- University: Tokai University
- Mixed martial arts record from Sherdog

Kana Watanabe (Japanese: 渡辺華奈, Watanabe Kana; born August 21, 1988) is a Japanese mixed martial artist. She is competing in the Flyweight division of the Professional Fighters League (PFL). She previously competed in Bellator MMA and Rizin Fighting Federation.

== Judo ==
She started judo at the age of seven at Rinkai Juku. In her third year at Shibuya Kyoiku Gakuen Shibuya Junior High School, she competed in the 63 kg category at the National Junior High School Judo Tournament, but lost in the third round. In her first year at Shibuya Kyoiku Gakuen Shibuya High School, she placed fifth at the National High School Championships, and in her second year she competed in the Kinwashi-ki competition, reaching the finals along with Nakamura Misato, a year her junior, but lost to Saitama Sakae High School, placing second. At the Inter High School Championships, she finished second in the individual competition, losing in the final to Wada Mami, a junior at Okatoyo High School, and third in the team competition. In the team competition at the National High School Championships, she played well with Nakamura and reached the final, but lost to Sanda Shosei High School, finishing second In her junior year, she won the Asian Junior Championships, but finished third at the All Japan Junior Championships.

In 2007 she went on to Tokai University, where she won the All-Japan Junior Championships in her freshman year. When asked by fellow judo player Nozomi Hirai, two years her senior, why Watanabe was nicknamed Pato, she tricked them into believing for several years that her real name was half-white, "Kana Watanabe Patricia". In reality, she was only called Pato because she looked like a parrot named Patricia that a friend of hers had. In her junior year, she placed fifth at the Kodokan Cup and competed in the weight division in her senior year, but lost in the first round to Ryotokuji Gakuen staff member Mie Tanaka in the Tomoe nage. She placed third in the student weight division.

In 2011, she became a member of JR East and took third place at the 2013 individual business championships. She then moved up to the 57 kg weight class and contributed to the team's second place finish in the 2016 Jitsugyo team competition against Komatsu, defeating the previous year's Kodokan Cup winner, Ji Ishikawa, with a giai (a technique ari). He received the Outstanding Player Award on this occasion. At the Asia Open Taipei, she lost in the final to Eimi Kaneko of the Japan Self-Defense Forces Physical Education Academy, and finished second. She retired from judo and became a coach, but she felt that she couldn't continue to train athletes while still feeling like she hadn't done enough as an athlete, so after only three months, she quit as a coach. After that, she joined Fighter's Flow, which was run by Takao Ueda, a mixed martial artist she knew. At this time, she was described as a beautiful woman with a small face and a muscular body, but also flexible enough to perform leg openings and Y-balances. In 2017, she participated in KUNOICHI, a female version of SASUKE aired on TBS, twice in a row, both times achieving top results.

== Mixed martial arts career ==
=== Rizin / DEEP ===
On December 3, 2017, in her mixed martial arts debut at DEEP Deep Jewels 18, she beat Hikari (Hikari Sato, Piroctetes Niigata) with an arm-hold crucifix, and appealed after the match to participate in RIZIN. On December 29, 2017, she fought Shizuka Sugiyama at Rizin World Grand Prix 2017: 2nd Round and won a 3-0 decision.

On March 10, 2018, Kana Watanabe took part at Deep Jewels 19 event versus Yukari Nabe. The fight ended with draw. However, on June 9, 2018, she took a revenge at Deep Jewels 20 and won by Decision (Majority). On August 26, 2018, she won the fight versus Asami Nakai at Deep - 85 Impact event by Submission (Armbar) in Round 1. On December 31, 2018, she had a rematch against Shizuka Sugiyama at Rizin - Heisei's Last Yarennoka! and won by KO in 11 seconds of the match.

On March 8, 2019, Kana Watanabe won her fight versus Soo Min Kang at Deep Jewels 23 by TKO (Punches) in Round 1. On April 21, 2019, she fought Justyna Haba at Rizin 15 and won by unanimous decision. On October 22, 2019, she won the fight versus Hee Eun Kang at Deep Jewels 26 by Submission (Rear-Naked Choke) in Round 1. On December 29, 2019, she faced Ilara Joani at Bellator Japan's "Bellator x RIZIN" and won by TKO with back mount and pounding. In a post-fight interview, she said, "Next year, if RIZIN can make a women's flyweight belt, I want to challenge for that belt, and I also want to challenge overseas." She also said "I want to challenge for the women's flyweight belt in RIZIN next year, and I also want to challenge overseas.

=== Bellator MMA ===
On December 10, 2020, it was announced that she had signed a multi-fight contract with Bellator.

On April 2, 2021, she made her U.S. debut at Bellator 255 against Alejandra Lara. She won the bout via split decision.

Watanabe faced Liz Carmouche on June 25, 2021 at Bellator 261. She lost the bout via TKO in the opening 35 seconds via a series of stand-up punches. It was her first loss in 12 career fights.

Watanabe faced Denise Kielholtz on May 13, 2022 at Bellator 281. She won the fight via a triangle choke submission in the second round.

Watanabe faced Ilima-Lei Macfarlane on April 22, 2023, at Bellator 295. She lost the close bout via split decision.

Watanabe faced Veta Arteaga on July 30, 2023 at Bellator MMA x Rizin 2. She won the fight by unanimous decision.

=== Professional Fighters League ===
Watanabe debuted with the Professional Fighters League (PFL) at PFL 1 on April 4, 2024 and won her bout against Shanna Young by unanimous decision. Young missed weight, so she was fined a percentage of her purse and given a point deduction in the standings.

Watanabe faced Liz Carmouche in a rematch on June 13, 2024 at PFL 4. She lost the fight via armbar submission in the third round.

On February 18, 2025, the promotion officially revealed that Watanabe joined the 2025 PFL Women's Flyweight Tournament.

In the quarterfinal, Watanabe faced Jena Bishop on April 11, 2025, at PFL 2. She lost the fight via unanimous decision.

Watanabe faced Paulina Wiśniewska on April 11, 2026, at PFL Chicago: Pettis vs. McKee. She lost the bout via TKO in the second round.

== Mixed martial arts record ==
Professional record breakdown
19 matches	13 wins	5 losses
By knockout	3	2
By submission	4	1
By decision	6	2
Draws	1	

Res.	Record	Opponent	Method	Event	Date	Round	Time	Location	Notes
Loss	13–5–1	Paulina Wiśniewska	TKO (elbows)	PFL Chicago: Pettis vs. McKee	April 11, 2026	2	3:15	Chicago, Illinois, United States	
Loss	13–4–1	Jena Bishop	Decision (unanimous)	PFL 2 (2025)	April 11, 2025	3	5:00	Orlando, Florida, United States	2025 PFL Women's Flyweight Tournament Quarterfinal.
Loss	13–3–1	Liz Carmouche	Submission (armbar)	PFL 4 (2024)	June 13, 2024	3	4:52	Uncasville, Connecticut, United States	
Win	13–2–1	Shanna Young	Decision (unanimous)	PFL 1 (2024)	April 4, 2024	3	5:00	San Antonio, Texas, United States	Catchweight (128.6 lb) bout; Young missed weight.
Win	12–2–1	Veta Arteaga	Decision (unanimous)	Bellator MMA x Rizin 2	July 30, 2023	3	5:00	Saitama, Japan	
Loss	11–2–1	Ilima-Lei Macfarlane	Decision (split)	Bellator 295	April 22, 2023	3	5:00	Honolulu, Hawaii, United States	
Win	11–1–1	Denise Kielholtz	Submission (triangle choke)	Bellator 281	May 13, 2022	2	3:03	London, England	Kielholtz was deducted one point in round 2 due to illegal upkick.
Loss	10–1–1	Liz Carmouche	TKO (punches)	Bellator 261	June 25, 2021	1	0:35	Uncasville, Connecticut, United States	
Win	10–0–1	Alejandra Lara	Decision (split)	Bellator 255	April 2, 2021	3	5:00	Uncasville, Connecticut, United States	
Win	9–0–1	Ilara Joanne	TKO (punches)	Bellator 237	December 29, 2019	3	4:39	Saitama, Japan	
Win	8–0–1	Kang Hee-eun	Submission (rear-naked choke)	Deep Jewels 26	October 22, 2019	1	1:48	Tokyo, Japan	
Win	7–0–1	Justyna Haba	Decision (unanimous)	Rizin 15	April 21, 2019	3	5:00	Yokohama, Japan	
Win	6–0–1	Kang Soo-min	TKO (punches)	Deep Jewels 23	March 8, 2019	1	4:33	Tokyo, Japan	
Win	5–0–1	Shizuka Sugiyama	TKO (punch)	Rizin: Heisei's Last Yarennoka!	December 31, 2018	1	0:11	Saitama, Japan	
Win	4–0–1	Asami Nakai	Submission (armbar)	DEEP 85 Impact	August 26, 2018	1	4:20	Tokyo, Japan	
Win	3–0–1	Yukari Nabe	Decision (majority)	Deep Jewels 20	June 9, 2018	3	5:00	Tokyo, Japan	
Draw	2–0–1	Yukari Nabe	Draw (majority)	Deep Jewels 19	March 10, 2018	2	5:00	Tokyo, Japan	
Win	2–0	Shizuka Sugiyama	Decision (unanimous)	Rizin World Grand Prix 2017: 2nd Round	December 29, 2017	3	5:00	Saitama, Japan	
Win	1–0	Hikari Sato	Technical Submission (armbar)	Deep Jewels 18	December 2, 2017	2	1:32	Tokyo, Japan	Flyweight debut.

== Filmography ==
=== Web shows ===
Year	Title	Role	Notes	Ref.
2025	Physical: Asia	Contestant	Netflix	

== See also ==
- List of current Bellator fighters
- List of female mixed martial artists
