= Sidney Outlaw =

American mixed martial artist (born 1992)

- Born: April 11, 1992 (age 34); Philadelphia, Pennsylvania, United States
- Other names: Da Gun
- Height: 5 ft 8 in (173 cm)
- Weight: 155 lb (70 kg; 11 st 1 lb)
- Division: Welterweight; Lightweight
- Reach: 74 in (188 cm)
- Stance: Orthodox
- Fighting out of: Telford, Pennsylvania
- Team: Dante Rivera BJJ
- Years active: 2013–present

Mixed martial arts record
- Total: 29
- Wins: 23
- By knockout: 1
- By submission: 11
- By decision: 11
- Losses: 6
- By knockout: 3
- By submission: 1
- By decision: 2

Other information
- Mixed martial arts record from Sherdog

Sidney Outlaw (born April 11, 1992) is an American mixed martial artist who competes in the Lightweight division. A professional since 2013, he has competed in promotions such as Bellator MMA and Titan FC.

== Background ==
Born and raised in North Philadelphia, Pennsylvania, Outlaw began his wrestling career in high school, then developing his passion for professional mixed martial arts by the age of sixteen. He was a league champion and state tournament qualifier. Outlaw also holds an accomplished background competing in Brazilian jiu-jitsu.

From the age of 19 till 27, when he signed with Bellator, Outlaw was homeless on and off. He would train in the day, and then work until 2 am every day, before being back in the gym at 9 am. He made his amateur debut as a teenager in high school, discovering MMA after moving out to the Souderton, Pennsylvania due to his mother wanting to move Sidney out of the crime ridden area they grew up in.

At the age of 18, Sidney decided to move to New Jersey to train with the likes of Frankie Edgar and Eddie Alvarez.

== Mixed martial arts career ==
=== Early career ===
Making his debut at Cage Fury Fighting Championships 19, he won his debut via second round TKO stoppage, before winning his next bout via third round submission under the Ring of Combat banner. Then he got the call to fight at Bellator 118, where he won a unanimous decision over Mike Bannon. He would suffer his first loss against Nick Browne at WSOF 13, losing by TKO stoppage 25 seconds into the bout. Complications between his manager and the promotion left him unaware he was even fighting until a week out from the event, leading him to undergo a drastic, rapid weight cut.

After going 2-1 in his next three bouts, Outlaw faced future UFC fighter Gregor Gillespie at Ring of Combat 55 in June 2016. Despite taking Gillespie's back late in the first round and close to securing the rear-naked choke, only being denied by the bell ending the round, Outlaw lost the close bout via split decision.

After winning the next three bouts, winning the ROC Welterweight and Lightweight Championships, Outlaw was invited on short notice to Dana White's Contender Series 2, facing Michael Cora at welterweight and without a full camp. Despite winning the bout via unanimous decision, he wasn't given a UFC contract.

In his next bout, he faced future PFL Lightweight champion Raush Manfio for the Titan FC Lightweight Championship at Titan FC 50. However, changed it was changed to a non-title bout when Outlaw missed weight,159.9 lbs. Outlaw would go on to win the bout via unanimous decision.

Outlaw defended his ROC Welterweight title against Krzysztof Kułak at ROC 65, winning by second round armbar, and would go on to win his next two bouts on the regional scene, defeating Zazch Fears via first round armbar at Island Fights 51 and Cesar Balmaceda at CFFC 74 via first round rear-naked choke.

=== Bellator MMA ===
Outlaw made his Bellator debut at Bellator 234 on November 14, 2019 against Roger Huerta. Outlaw won via unanimous decision.

Outlaw, as a replacement for Benson Henderson, faced former two-time Bellator Lightweight Champion Michael Chandler at Bellator 237 on December 29, 2019. Outlaw lost the fight via knockout in round one.

Outlaw next faced Adam Piccolotti at Bellator 244 on August 21, 2020. Outlaw won the fight via split decision. 2 out of 2 media scores gave it to Outlaw.

Outlaw faced Myles Jury at Bellator 261 on June 25, 2021. After dominating Jury on the ground, Outlaw won the bout via rear-naked choke submission in round three.

Outlaw was scheduled to challenge for the Bellator MMA Lightweight Championship against reigning champ Patricky Pitbull on July 22, 2022 at Bellator 283. On July 4, it was announced that Patricky had sustained an injury, and The next day, after he was booked against Tofiq Musayev in the co-main. Outlaw lost the bout via TKO stoppage 27 seconds into the bout.

==== Bellator Lightweight World Grand Prix ====
On January 11, 2023, Outlaw was announced as one of the 8 participants in the $1 million Bellator Lightweight World Grand Prix. Outlaw was scheduled to face Mansour Barnaoui on May 12, 2023, at Bellator 296. However at the end of February, Outlaw tested positive for banned substances: ostarine, cardarine and anastrozole, and was suspended for 6 months, being eligible to return on August 4, 2023.

Outlaw faced Islam Mamedov on August 11, 2023 at Bellator 298. He won the fight via unanimous decision.

Outlaw faced A. J. McKee on November 17, 2023 at Bellator 301. Despite being on the top for most of the bout, McKee was able to inflict enough damage on Outlaw via the use of elbows, leading to Outlaw losing the unanimous decision.

On January 24, 2024, it was announced that Outlaw was no longer with the promotion.

==== Global Fight League ====
On December 11, 2024, it was announced that Outlaw was signed by Global Fight League. However, in April 2025, it was reported that all GFL events were cancelled indefinitely.

== Professional grappling career ==
Outlaw competed against Terrance McKinney in a grappling match at ADXC 2 on January 19, 2024. He won the match by submission in the first round.

== Championships and achievements ==
- Ring of Combat
  - ROC Welterweight Championship (One time)
    - One successful title defense
  - ROC Lightweight Championship (One time)

== Mixed martial arts record ==
Professional record breakdown
29 matches	23 wins	6 losses
By knockout	1	3
By submission	11	1
By decision	11	2

Res.	Record	Opponent	Method	Event	Date	Round	Time	Location	Notes
Win	23–6	Rasul Magomedov	Submission (rear-naked choke)	ACA 206	August 15, 2026	2	3:16	Moscow, Russia	
Win	22–6	Davi Ramos	Decision (unanimous)	ACA 201	March 27, 2026	3	5:00	Minsk, Belarus	
Win	21–6	Pavel Gordeev	Decision (unanimous)	ACA 197	December 5, 2025	3	5:00	Moscow, Russia	
Win	20–6	Lom-Ali Nalgiev	Submission (rear-naked choke)	ACA 192	September 14, 2025	1	1:08	Almaty, Kazakhstan	Catchweight (160.2 lb) bout; Outlaw missed weight.
Win	19–6	Marco Antonio Elpidio	Decision (unanimous)	Supreme Fight Night 7	October 18, 2024	3	5:00	Chiapas, Mexico	
Win	18–6	Dan Moret	Technical Submission (rear-naked choke)	XFC 51	September 27, 2024	1	1:07	Milwaukee, Wisconsin, United States	
Loss	17–6	A. J. McKee	Decision (unanimous)	Bellator 301	November 17, 2023	3	5:00	Chicago, Illinois, United States	
Win	17–5	Islam Mamedov	Decision (unanimous)	Bellator 298	August 11, 2023	3	5:00	Sioux Falls, South Dakota, United States	Catchweight (160 lb) bout.
Loss	16–5	Tofiq Musayev	TKO (punches)	Bellator 283	July 22, 2022	1	0:27	Tacoma, Washington, United States	
Win	16–4	Myles Jury	Submission (rear-naked choke)	Bellator 261	June 25, 2021	3	4:44	Uncasville, Connecticut, United States	
Win	15–4	Adam Piccolotti	Decision (split)	Bellator 244	August 21, 2020	3	5:00	Uncasville, Connecticut, United States	
Loss	14–4	Michael Chandler	KO (punches)	Bellator 237	December 29, 2019	1	2:59	Saitama, Japan	Catchweight (160 lb) bout.
Win	14–3	Roger Huerta	Decision (unanimous)	Bellator 234	November 14, 2019	3	5:00	Tel Aviv, Israel	Return to Lightweight.
Win	13–3	Cesar Balmaceda	Submission (rear-naked choke)	CFFC 74	May 17, 2019	1	2:30	Atlantic City, New Jersey, United States	Catchweight (160 lb) bout.
Win	12–3	Zach Fears	Submission (armbar)	Island Fights 51	December 21, 2018	1	4:52	Pensacola, Florida, United States	
Win	11–3	Krzysztof Kułak	Submission (armbar)	Ring of Combat 65	September 21, 2018	2	1:46	Atlantic City, New Jersey, United States	Return to Welterweight. Defended the ROC Welterweight Championship.
Win	10–3	Raush Manfio	Decision (unanimous)	Titan FC 50	June 29, 2018	3	5:00	Fort Lauderdale, Florida, United States	Non-title bout; Outlaw missed weight (159.9 lb).
Win	9–3	Michael Cora	Decision (unanimous)	Dana White's Contender Series 2	July 18, 2017	3	5:00	Las Vegas, Nevada, United States	Welterweight bout.
Win	8–3	James Rumley	Submission (rear-naked choke)	Ring of Combat 59	June 2, 2017	1	4:18	Atlantic City, New Jersey, United States	Won the vacant ROC Lightweight Championship.
Win	7–3	Taj Abdul-Hakim	Decision (unanimous)	Ring of Combat 58	February 24, 2017	3	5:00	Atlantic City, New Jersey, United States	Won the vacant ROC Welterweight Championship.
Win	6–3	Lashawn Alcocks	Submission (rear-naked choke)	PA Cage Fight 26	October 15, 2016	2	2:55	Scranton, Pennsylvania, United States	
Loss	5–3	Gregor Gillespie	Decision (split)	Ring of Combat 55	June 3, 2016	3	5:00	Atlantic City, New Jersey, United States	For the ROC Lightweight Championship. Return to Lightweight.
Loss	5–2	Elijah Harshbarger	Submission (guillotine choke)	Ring of Combat 53	November 20, 2015	1	0:46	Atlantic City, New Jersey, United States	
Win	5–1	Darrius Heyliger	Submission (rear-naked choke)	NEF 19	September 12, 2015	1	3:42	Lewiston, Maine, United States	
Win	4–1	Christian Leonard	Decision (unanimous)	Global Proving Ground 21	July 25, 2015	3	5:00	Pennsauken, New Jersey, United States	Welterweight debut.
Loss	3–1	Nick Browne	TKO (punches)	WSOF 13	September 13, 2014	1	0:25	Bethlehem, Pennsylvania, United States	Catchweight (163.9 lb) bout; Outlaw missed weight.
Win	3–0	Mike Bannon	Decision (unanimous)	Bellator 118	May 2, 2014	3	5:00	Atlantic City, New Jersey, United States	
Win	2–0	Steve Simms	Submission (rear-naked choke)	Ring of Combat 45	June 14, 2013	3	3:37	Atlantic City, New Jersey, United States	Catchweight (162 lb) bout.
Win	1–0	Mtume Goodrum	TKO (punches)	Cage Fury FC 19	February 2, 2013	2	4:04	Richmond, Virginia, United States	Lightweight debut.

== See also ==
- List of male mixed martial artists
