= Bellator 292 =

Bellator mixed martial arts event in 2023

Bellator 292: Nurmagomedov vs. Henderson
- The poster for Bellator 292: Nurmagomedov vs. Henderson
- Promotion: Bellator MMA
- Date: March 10, 2023
- Venue: SAP Center
- City: San Jose, California, United States

Event chronology
Bellator 291: Amosov vs. Storley 2	Bellator 292: Nurmagomedov vs. Henderson	Bellator 293: Golm vs. James

Bellator 292: Nurmagomedov vs. Henderson was a mixed martial arts event produced by Bellator MMA that took place on March 10, 2023, at the SAP Center in San Jose, California, United States.

== Background ==
The event marked the promotion's 13th visit to San Jose and first since Bellator 277 in April 2022.

As part of the $1 million Bellator Lightweight World Grand Prix, a Bellator Lightweight World Championship bout between current champion Usman Nurmagomedov and Benson Henderson (former WEC and UFC Lightweight Champion) headlined the event. In the co-main event, Tofiq Musayev faced off against Alexandr Shabliy in a quarterfinal match. After the main event bout, Henderson announced his retirement from professional mixed martial arts.

A bantamweight bout between former title challenger Leandro Higo (also former LFA Bantamweight Champion) and James Gallagher was scheduled for this event. However, in Mid February, Gallagher pulled out of the bout due to undisclosed reasons and the bout was scrapped.

A women's flyweight bout between Keri Taylor-Melendez and Bruna Ellen was scheduled for this event. However, at the end of February, Taylor-Melendez pulled out of the bout and it was scrapped.

At the weigh-ins, Cass Bell weighed in at 145.2 pounds, 9.2 pounds over the non-title bantamweight fight limit. The bout proceeded at catchweight with Bell being fined 50% of his purse, which went to his opponent Josh Hill.

== Results ==
Main Card (Showtime)
Weight class				Method	Round	Time	Notes
Lightweight	Usman Nurmagomedov (c)	def.	Benson Henderson	Submission (rear-naked choke)	1	2:37	(Note: Bellator Lightweight World Grand Prix Quarterfinal for the Bellator Lightweight World Championship.)
Lightweight	Alexandr Shabliy	def.	Tofiq Musayev	TKO (body kick)	3	0:29	(Note: Bellator Lightweight World Grand Prix Quarterfinal.)
Heavyweight	Linton Vassell	def.	Valentin Moldavsky	KO (punches and elbows)	1	3:03
Welterweight	Michael Page	def.	Goiti Yamauchi	TKO (leg kick)	1	0:26
Preliminary card (Youtube/Pluto TV)
Featherweight	Enrique Barzola	def.	Erik Pérez	Decision (unanimous) (29–28, 30–27, 30–27)	3	5:00
Catchweight (146 lb)	Josh Hill	def.	Cass Bell	Decision (split) (28–29, 29–28, 29–28)	3	5:00	(Note: Originally a bantamweight bout; Bell missed weight (145.2 lb).)
Middleweight	Khalid Murtazaliev	def.	Tony Johnson	Decision (unanimous) (30–27, 30–27, 30–27)	3	5:00
Light Heavyweight	Dovletdzhan Yagshimuradov	def.	Julius Anglickas	Decision (unanimous) (30–27, 30–27, 30–27)	3	5:00
Featherweight	Laird Anderson	def.	Rogelio Luna	Technical Submission (rear-naked choke)	1	2:41
Middleweight	Theo Haig	def.	Adam Wamsley	Submission (guillotine choke)	1	3:01

== Reported payout ==
The following is the reported payout to the fighters as reported to the California State Athletic Commission. The amounts do not include sponsor money, discretionary bonuses, viewership points or additional earnings.

- Usman Nurmagomedov: $150,000 (no win bonus) def. Benson Henderson: $150,000
- Alexander Shabliy: $150,000 (includes $75,000 win bonus) def. Tofiq Musayev: $65,000
- Linton Vassell: $100,000 (no win bonus) def. Valentin Moldavsky: $75,000
- Michael Page: $100,000 (no win bonus) def. Goiti Yamauchi: $66,000
- Enrique Barzola: $62,000 (includes $31,000 win bonus) def. Érik Pérez: $20,000
- Josh Hill: $80,000 (includes $40,000 win bonus) def. Cass Bell: $13,000
- Khalid Murtazaliev: $40,000 (includes $20,000 win bonus) def. Tony Johnson: $10,000
- Dovletdzhan Yagshimuradov: $80,000 (includes $40,000 win bonus) def. Julius Anglickas: $50,000
- Laird Anderson: $8,000 (includes $4,000 win bonus) def. Rogelio Luna: $2,000
- Theo Haig: $6,000 (includes $3,000 win bonus) def. Adam Wamsley: $2,000

== See also ==
- 2023 in Bellator MMA
- List of Bellator MMA events
- List of current Bellator fighters
