= Tofiq Musayev =

Azerbaijani mixed martial artist

- Born: Tofiq Musayev; December 15, 1989 (age 36); Sahil, Azerbaijan SSR, Soviet Union
- Native name: Тофик Мусаев
- Height: 5 ft 10 in (1.78 m)
- Weight: 155 lb (70 kg; 11 st 1 lb)
- Division: Lightweight, Welterweight
- Reach: 72 in (183 cm)
- Fighting out of: Baku, Azerbaijan
- Team: Orion Fight Club
- Years active: 2013–present

Mixed martial arts record
- Total: 30
- Wins: 24
- By knockout: 19
- By submission: 2
- By decision: 3
- Losses: 6
- By knockout: 1
- By submission: 4
- By decision: 1

Other information
- Mixed martial arts record from Sherdog

Tofiq Musayev (born December 15, 1989) is an Azerbaijani professional mixed martial artist who currently competes in the Lightweight division of the Ultimate Fighting Championship (UFC). He has previously fought for Rizin Fighting Federation, where he was the Rizin Lightweight Grand Prix Champion, and for Bellator MMA. As of October 31, 2026, he is #12 in the Meta UFC lightweight rankings.

== Early life ==
Tofiq Musayev was born in Sahil, Azerbaijan. Even at school, due to the minimum number of sports sections, he went to karate and later with pankration, kung-fu and taekwondo. Initially having success at the regional level, Musaev devoted himself to sanda, therefore, after graduating from school in 2007, he entered the Azeribaijan sports academy until 2011. He became Asian Pankration champion in 2016. He is blue belt in Brazilian jiu-jitsu.

== Mixed martial arts career ==
=== Early career ===
Tofiq made his professional debut at the Azerbaijan MMA Federation in May 2013. When selected for the main event in that match, he achieved a heel hold in 1R and won his debut match. In his first 6 fights, he had a 3–3 record, losing by submission in two cases out of three. Starting with the Ukrainian Oplot Challenge events, the athlete began to travel to Russia and perform there.

He also maintained a professional presence in his home country as mixed martial arts (MMA) increased in popularity. His performance improved as he developed a fighting style characterized by significant striking power. In 2016, Musaev made his first trip to China, where he had a couple of performances before being spotted at the WFCA.

In his Russia debut match, he defeated Murad Shakhbaev, after which he went to Turkey for one fight, where he performed at Orion Fight Arena tournament, but then returned to the WFCA, as he planned to take the belt there. His next meeting was with Zurab Betergaraev, but the application for the status of the applicant was made in the confrontation with Marif Piraev. He won via technical knockout in round one. In 2018, Musaev signed with Rizin Fighting Federation for their New Year's Eve event.

=== Rizin Fighting Federation ===
Musayev made his Rizin debut at Rizin 14 against Nobumitsu Osawa as the opening bout of the night. He won by TKO in the 2nd round.

He was scheduled to face Daron Cruickshank at Rizin 16. He won by unanimous decision.

==== Lightweight Grand Prix ====
Rizin announced that they would be hosting a Lightweight Grand Prix from September. Tofiq was 1 of 8 participants announced. On September 20, 2019, Tofiq was drawn against Damien Brown at Rizin 19 as the quarterfinal match. He won by TKO in the final minute of the first round.

At Rizin 20, Musayev took on Johnny Case in the semi-finals. Musayev won via knockout in the first round. In the finals, he met Bellator Lightweight title challenger Patricky Freire. It ended in a unanimous decision for Musaev, earning him the Lightweight Grand Prix belt. His performance earned him widespread attention from his home country. Fight Matrix ranked him at #13 for one of the best lightweights outside of the UFC in 2020.

After his Grand Prix, Musayev was approached by the UFC, but declined an offer as he waited for Rizin to make a proposal. "We were approached from the UFC, made a concrete proposal. But at the moment we are waiting for a response from Rizin. If we are satisfied with their proposal, then we will remain in this organization and will defend the title. Otherwise, I go to the UFC." Musayev confirmed in March 2020 that he will sign a new contract with Rizin, despite offers from both the UFC and ONE. He stated "[Rizin] respect[s] their fighters and try to give them everything so that they stay with them."

Musayev did not participate in Rizin during 2020 and early half of 2021 due to the COVID-19 pandemic. Fellow Rizin lightweight, Roberto de Souza, stated ahead of Rizin 27 that the promotion should crown a new champion if Musayev cannot return.

On June 1, 2021, it was announced that Tofiq will face Roberto de Souza on June 13, 2021, at Rizin 28 for the inaugural Rizin FF Lightweight Championship. After a 14-day quarantine period from entry due to measures against COVID-19, he faced Roberto de Souza and lost in the first round due to a triangle choke.

=== Bellator MMA ===
On January 10, 2022, it was announced that Musayev signed a multi-fight contract with Bellator MMA.

Musayev was scheduled to make his Bellator debut on April 22, 2022, at Bellator 278 against Zach Zane. However, the bout was scrapped after Zane pulled out for unknown reasons and Tofiq wasn't rebooked against a new opponent.

Musayev was scheduled to face Adam Piccolotti on July 22, 2022, at Bellator 283. Piccolotti however pulled out of the bout due to injury. Musayev was instead rebooked against Sidney Outlaw, after his opponent pulled out of their bout, and won the match via knockout 27 seconds into the first round.

On January 11, 2023, Musayev was announced as one of the 8 participants in the $1 million Lightweight Grand Prix, with his quarterfinal bout against Alexandr Shabliy taking place on March 10, 2023, at Bellator 292. Musayev lost the bout in the third round, with a body kick rendering him unable to continue.

Musayev returned to face Akira Okada at the co-promotion event Bellator MMA x Rizin 2 on July 30, 2023. He won the fight via knockout in the second round.

Tofiq faced Koji Takeda on November 4, 2023 at Rizin Landmark 7. He won the bout via ground and pound knockout in the third round.

Musayev was scheduled to face Alfie Davis on March 22, 2024 at Bellator Champions Series 1. On March 15, it was announced that Musayev had pulled out of the bout.

=== Ultimate Fighting Championship ===
Musayev made his debut with the Ultimate Fighting Championship against Myktybek Orolbai on June 21, 2025 at UFC on ABC 8. The bout proceeded as a 165-pound catchweight fight as both fighters exceeded the lightweight non-title fight limit during the weigh-ins, with Musayev weighing 163 pounds and Orolbai weighing 165 pounds. Musayev lost the fight via a kimura submission in the first round.

Musayev was scheduled to face Samuel Sanches on April 4, 2026, at UFC Fight Night 272. However, Sanches withdrew for undisclosed reasons, so Musayev was booked to face Ignacio Bahamondes on March 28, 2026 at UFC Fight Night 271 instead. Musayev won the fight by unanimous decision. This fight earned him a $100,000 Fight of the Night award, but was considered controversial due to Musayev's illegal fence grabs and headbutts.

Musayev faced Ľudovít Klein on August 1, 2026 at UFC Fight Night 283. He won the fight by technical knockout in the second round.

== Championships and achievements ==
=== Mixed martial arts ===
- Rizin Fighting Federation
  - Rizin Lightweight Grand Prix Champion
- Ultimate Fighting Championship
  - Fight of the Night (One time) vs. Ignacio Bahamondes

== Mixed martial arts record ==
Professional record breakdown
30 matches	24 wins	6 losses
By knockout	19	1
By submission	2	4
By decision	3	1

Res.	Record	Opponent	Method	Event	Date	Round	Time	Location	Notes
Win	24–6	Ľudovít Klein	TKO (punches)	UFC Fight Night: Medić vs. Rodriguez	August 1, 2026	2	4:07	Belgrade, Serbia	
Win	23–6	Ignacio Bahamondes	Decision (unanimous)	UFC Fight Night: Adesanya vs. Pyfer	March 28, 2026	3	5:00	Seattle, Washington, United States	Fight of the Night.
Loss	22–6	Myktybek Orolbai	Submission (kimura)	UFC on ABC: Hill vs. Rountree Jr.	June 21, 2025	1	4:35	Baku, Azerbaijan	Catchweight (165 lb) bout.
Win	22–5	Koji Takeda	KO (punches)	Rizin Landmark 7	November 4, 2023	3	2:03	Baku, Azerbaijan	
Win	21–5	Akira Okada	KO (punches)	Super Rizin 2	July 30, 2023	2	1:11	Saitama, Japan	
Loss	20–5	Alexandr Shabliy	TKO (body kick)	Bellator 292	March 10, 2023	3	0:29	San Jose, California, United States	Bellator Lightweight World Grand Prix Quarterfinal.
Win	20–4	Sidney Outlaw	KO (punches)	Bellator 283	July 22, 2022	1	0:27	Tacoma, Washington, United States	
Loss	19–4	Roberto de Souza	Submission (triangle choke)	Rizin 28	June 13, 2021	1	1:12	Tokyo, Japan	For the inaugural Rizin Lightweight Championship.
Win	19–3	Patricky Pitbull	Decision (unanimous)	Rizin 20	December 31, 2019	3	5:00	Saitama, Japan	Won the 2019 Rizin Lightweight Grand Prix.
Win	18–3	Johnny Case	TKO (punches)	Rizin 20	December 31, 2019	1	2:47	Saitama, Japan	2019 Rizin Lightweight Grand Prix Semifinal.
Win	17–3	Damien Brown	TKO (head kick and punches)	Rizin 19	October 12, 2019	1	4:14	Osaka, Japan	2019 Rizin Lightweight Grand Prix Quarterfinal.
Win	16–3	Daron Cruickshank	Decision (unanimous)	Rizin 16	June 2, 2019	3	5:00	Kobe, Japan	
Win	15–3	Nobumitsu Osawa	TKO (punches)	Rizin 14	December 31, 2018	2	1:19	Saitama, Japan	
Win	14–3	Marif Piraev	TKO (punches)	WFCA 48	May 4, 2018	1	3:24	Baku, Azerbaijan	
Win	13–3	Zurab Betergaraev	TKO (foot injury)	WFCA 45	February 24, 2018	2	1:23	Grozny, Russia	
Win	12–3	Murat Kocaturk	TKO (punches)	Orion Fight Arena: Spectacular Kickboxing MMA Gala	October 21, 2017	2	2:50	Ankara, Turkey	
Win	11–3	Murad Shakhbanov	TKO (punches)	WFCA 34	February 25, 2017	3	2:16	Moscow, Russia	Return to Lightweight.
Win	10–3	Ayub Fahimi	KO (punches)	Azerbaijan MMA Federation: Azerbaijan vs. Iran	December 31, 2016	1	3:56	Baku, Azerbaijan	
Win	9–3	Ooi Aik Tong	TKO (punches)	Chinese Wushu Fight League	June 5, 2016	1	1:35	Guangzhou, China	
Win	8–3	Jiang Tao	TKO (punches)	Chinese Wushu Fight League	June 5, 2016	1	3:52	Guangzhou, China	
Win	7–3	Bao Yincang	TKO (punches)	International Kungfu Competition: Matan Tesco Cup	November 27, 2015	1	3:55	Jiangsu, China	Catchweight (165 lb) bout.
Win	6–3	Shamil Magomedzagidov	KO (punch)	Azerbaijan MMA Federation: National Open Cup	October 2, 2015	1	3:42	Baku, Azerbaijan	
Win	5–3	Magomed Alkuliev	KO (punch)	Selection of Warriors 3	September 18, 2015	1	2:53	Makhachkala, Russia	
Loss	4–3	Aigun Akhmedov	Decision (unanimous)	New Stream: Russia vs. The World	October 31, 2014	2	5:00	Moscow, Russia	
Win	4–2	Said Khalilov	TKO (punches)	MMA Star in the Ring 2	June 13, 2014	1	3:33	Makhachkala, Russia	Return to Welterweight.
Loss	3–2	Evgeny Lakhin	Submission (triangle choke)	Siberian League: Combat Kuzbass 1	April 21, 2014	1	1:12	Kemerovo, Russia	Lightweight debut.
Win	3–1	Musulman Muslimov	TKO (punches)	MMA Star in the Ring 1	May 1, 2014	1	N/A	Makhachkala, Russia	
Loss	2–1	Mukhamed Berkhamov	Submission (anaconda choke)	Oplot Challenge 90	November 30, 2013	1	4:09	Kharkov, Ukraine	
Win	2–0	Emilbek Beknazarov	Submission (rear-naked choke)	Oplot Challenge 80	September 22, 2013	1	3:26	Kharkov, Ukraine	
Win	1–0	Yavuz Selim Kazanci	Submission (heel hook)	Azerbaijan MMA Federation: Azerbaijan vs. Turkey	May 29, 2013	1	2:33	Baku, Azerbaijan	Welterweight debut.

== See also ==
- List of current UFC fighters
- List of male mixed martial artists
