= Bellator 283 =

Bellator mixed martial arts event in 2022

Bellator 283: Lima vs. Jackson
- The poster for Bellator 283: Lima vs. Jackson
- Promotion: Bellator MMA
- Date: July 22, 2022
- Venue: Emerald Queen Casino and Hotel
- City: Tacoma, Washington, United States

Event chronology
Bellator 282: Mousasi vs. Eblen	Bellator 283: Lima vs. Jackson	Bellator 284: Gracie vs. Yamauchi

Bellator 283: Lima vs. Jackson was a mixed martial arts event produced by Bellator MMA that took place on July 22, 2022 at Emerald Queen Casino and Hotel in Tacoma, Washington, United States.

== Background ==
The event marked the promotion's debut in Tacoma and the state of Washington.

A Bellator Lightweight World Championship bout between current champion Patricky Pitbull and Sidney Outlaw was expected to headline the event. However on July 4, it was announced that Pitbull had sustained an injury and that the bout would be moved to a later date. The next day, after Adam Piccolotti pulled out of his bout against Tofiq Musayev, Outlaw and Musayev were booked against each other in the co-main.

The co-main event was to feature former Bellator Welterweight World Champion Douglas Lima and Jason Jackson. The bout was initially scheduled for May 13, 2022 at Bellator 281. However, for unknown reasons, the bout was pulled from the event and was rescheduled for this event. After the main event between Pitbull and Outlaw was scrapped and the reshuffling of the bouts, the bout was promoted to new headliner and 5 rounds.

A light heavyweight bout between Viktor Nemkov and José Augusto Azevedo was scheduled for this event, however due to an injury to Nemkov, the bout was scrapped.

A lightweight bout between Justin Montalvo and Vladimir Tokov was scheduled for this event, however due to an injury to Tokov, he pulled out of the bout and was replaced by Archie Colgan. Colgan instead faced Bryan Nuro in a 160 lb catchweight bout.

A featherweight bout between Kai Kamaka III and Akhmed Magomedov was scheduled for this event. Kamaka however pulled out of the bout for unknown reasons.

At the weigh-ins, Douglas Lima, came in at 172.8 lbs, 1.8 pounds heavy for his headlining welterweight bout vs. Jason Jackson, along with Kevin Boehm weighing in at 147.6 lbs, 1.6 pounds over limit for his featherweight bout and Mark Coates weighing in at 137.8 lbs, 1.8 pounds over limit for his bantamweight bout. The bouts proceeded at a catchweight and they were fined a percentage of their individual purses, which went to their opponents.

== Results ==
Main Card (Showtime)
Weight class				Method	Round	Time	Notes
Catchweight (172.8 lbs)	Jason Jackson	def.	Douglas Lima	Decision (unanimous) (50–45, 50–45, 50–45)	5	5:00	(Note: Lima missed weight (172.8 lbs))
Lightweight	Tofiq Musayev	def.	Sidney Outlaw	TKO (punches)	1	0:27
Lightweight	Usman Nurmagomedov	def.	Chris Gonzalez	Submission (guillotine choke)	1	2:54
Welterweight	Lorenz Larkin	vs.	Mukhamed Berkhamov	No Contest (illegal elbow)	1	2:52
Heavyweight	Marcelo Golm	def.	Davion Franklin	Submission (rear-naked choke)	3	4:36
Preliminary card (Youtube/Pluto TV)
Middleweight	Dalton Rosta	def.	Romero Cotton	TKO (punches)	3	0:38
Women's Flyweight	Veta Arteaga	def.	Vanessa Porto	Submission (guillotine choke)	2	3:47
Lightweight	Gadzhi Rabadanov	def.	Bobby King	Decision (unanimous) (30–27, 30–27, 30–27)	3	5:00
Catchweight (147.6 lbs)	Akhmed Magomedov	def.	Kevin Boehm	Submission (rear-naked choke)	1	1:16	(Note: Boehm missed weight (147.6 lbs))
Welterweight	Roman Faraldo	def.	Luis Iniguez	KO (punch)	1	3:42
Catchweight (137.8 lbs)	Jaylon Bates	def.	Mark Coates	Decision (split) (30–27, 28–29, 29–28)	3	5:00	(Note: Coates missed weight (137.8 lbs))
Catchweight (160 lbs)	Archie Colgan	def.	Bryan Nuro	TKO (punches)	3	1:15

== Reported payout ==
The following is the reported payout to the fighters as reported to the Washington State Athletic Commission. The amounts do not include sponsor money, discretionary bonuses, viewership points or additional earnings.

- Jason Jackson: $191,000 (includes $83,000 win bonus) def. Douglas Lima: $100,000
- Tofiq Musayev: $70,000 (includes $35,000 win bonus) def. Sidney Outlaw: $30,000
- Usman Nurmagomedov: $100,000 (includes $50,000 win bonus) def. Chris Gonzalez: $30,000
- Mukhamed Berkhamov: $33,000 vs. Lorenz Larkin: $125,000
- Marcelo Golm: $40,000 (includes $20,000 win bonus) def. Davion Franklin: $30,000
- Dalton Rosta: $50,000 (includes $25,000 win bonus) def. Romero Cotton: $25,000
- Veta Arteaga: $46,000 (includes $23,000 win bonus) def. Vanessa Porto: $18,000
- Gadzhi Rabadanov: $62,000 (includes $31,000 win bonus) def. Bobby King: $17,000
- Akhmed Magomedov: $24,000 (includes $12,000 win bonus) def. Kevin Boehm: $4,000
- Roman Faraldo: $20,000 (includes $10,000 win bonus) def. Luis Iniguez: $8,000
- Jaylon Bates: $22,000 def. Mark Coates: $4,000
- Archie Colgan: $7,500 def. Bryan Nuro: $4,000

== See also ==
- 2022 in Bellator MMA
- List of Bellator MMA events
- List of current Bellator fighters
