= Patricky Pitbull =

Brazilian mixed martial arts (MMA) fighter

- Born: Patricky de Sousa Freire; January 21, 1986 (age 40); Mossoró, Rio Grande do Norte, Brazil
- Height: 5 ft 9 in (1.75 m)
- Weight: 155 lb (70 kg; 11.1 st)
- Division: Lightweight
- Reach: 71 in (180 cm)
- Style: Kickboxing, BJJ
- Fighting out of: Natal, Rio Grande do Norte, Brazil
- Team: Pitbull Brothers
- Rank: Black belt in Brazilian jiu-jitsu
- Years active: 2005–present

Mixed martial arts record
- Total: 41
- Wins: 25
- By knockout: 17
- By submission: 1
- By decision: 7
- Losses: 16
- By knockout: 4
- By submission: 1
- By decision: 11

Other information
- Spouse: Ingrid R. Perrota Freire
- Children: Leticia R. Perrota Freire, Laura R. Perrota Freire, Lucas R. Perrota Freire
- Notable relatives: Patrício Pitbull (brother)
- Mixed martial arts record from Sherdog

Patricky de Sousa Freire (born January 21, 1986), known professionally as Patricky Pitbull, is a Brazilian mixed martial artist currently competing in Lightweight division. He most notably competed for Bellator MMA, where he was a former Bellator Lightweight Champion. He is the older brother of featherweight fighter Patrício Pitbull.

== Mixed martial arts career ==
=== Bellator MMA ===
After competing in many Brazilian promotions, Freire compiled a 7–1 record before entering the Bellator Season Four Lightweight Tournament. He faced former WEC Lightweight Champion, Rob McCullough at Bellator 36 on March 12, 2011, in the opening round of the tournament. He won via TKO in the third round.

Freire went on to face two-time finalist Toby Imada in the semifinal at Bellator 39. Freire defeated Imada via knockout in the first round after landing a brutal flying knee and following up with a flurry of punches which caused Imada to fall to the mat unconscious. The win saw him progress to the final of the tournament where he faced fellow finalist Michael Chandler at Bellator 44. Freire lost via unanimous decision.

Freire next faced Kurt Pellegrino at Bellator 59 on November 26, 2011. He won the fight via TKO in the first round.

Freire faced Eddie Alvarez at Bellator 76. After a back-and-forth opening minute that saw both fighters rocked, he lost the fight via knockout in the first round.

It was announced that Freire will face Guillaume De Lorenzi in the Bellator 2013 Lightweight Tournament on January 31. Unfortunately, Freire suffered an injury and pulled out of the Lightweight Tournament a few days prior to this fight.

Freire returned to the Bellator cage on September 7, 2013, as he faced Derek Anderson at Bellator 98. Despite winning the first round, Freire lost the fight via unanimous decision.

In March 2014, Freire entered into the Bellator Season Ten Lightweight Tournament, where he faced David Rickels in the opening round at Bellator 113. He won the fight via knockout in the second round. In the semifinals, he faced Derek Campos at Bellator 117. Again he won the fight via TKO in the second round. He was scheduled to face Marcin Held in the finals at Bellator 120. However, Held was forced out of the bout due to injury, and the fight was subsequently cancelled. The bout eventually took place at Bellator 126 on September 26, 2014. Freire lost the fight via unanimous decision.

After nearly a year away from the sport, Freire returned to face Saad Awad at Bellator 141 on August 28, 2015. He won the fight by unanimous decision.

In the first rematch of his career, Freire faced Derek Anderson for a second time on December 4, 2015, at Bellator 147. He again lost the fight, this time by controversial split decision.

Freire replaced an injured Derek Anderson to face Ryan Couture at Bellator 148 on January 29, 2016. He won the bout via knockout in the first round.

It was announced that Freire will face Derek Campos for the second time as the Bellator 152 main event. Just four days before their scheduled bout Campos pulled out due to injury and replaced by the newly signed former UFC fighter Kevin Souza.

In May 2016, Bellator President Scott Coker announced that Freire would have a rematch against Michael Chandler at Bellator 157 on June 17, 2016. The bout was for the vacant Bellator Lightweight Championship, which was vacated when champion Will Brooks was released from the promotion. Freire lost the fight via knockout in the first round.

Freire returned to the Bellator cage on February 18, 2017, in the main event at Bellator 172 against Josh Thomson. He won the fight via knockout in the second round.

Freire was expected to face Derek Campos for a second time at Bellator 167 on December 3, 2016, however Freire was forced out of the bout due to an injury. The rematch was scheduled to take place at Bellator 181 on July 14, 2017. However, Freire instead faced Benson Henderson at Bellator 183 on September 23, 2017. He won the fight by split decision. Freire is facing a 180-day medical suspension, unless he gets physician clearance regarding right rib pain.

Freire faced Derek Campos in a rematch at Bellator 194 on February 16, 2018. He won the fight via TKO in round one.

Freire faced Roger Huerta on September 21, 2018, at Bellator 205. He won the fight via knockout.

Bellator booked Freire against newcomer Ryan Scope for their first show in the Bellator Europe series that marked the start of the organization's partnership with Channel 5 and Sky Sports. The event was called Bellator Newcastle and took place on February 11. Despite rupturing a tendon in his right wrist on the first round of the fight, Freire won by split decision.

On February 20, 2019, Bellator announced that Freire had signed a multi-year, multi-fight contract extension with the organization.

=== Rizin FF ===
Due to his brother being the prevailing Bellator Lightweight champion, Patricky decided to take part in Rizin FF Lightweight tournament. In the first round of the tournament, Freire faced Tatsuya Kawajiri at Rizin 19 on October 12, 2019. He won the fight via knockout in the first round.

In the semifinals of the grand prix Freire faced Luiz Gustavo at Rizin 20 - Saitama on December 31, 2019. Freire won the fight via a first minute knockout and advanced to the grand prix final.

The 2019 Rizin Lightweight Grand Prix final was held in the same event with the semifinals. Despite Tofiq Musayev receiving a yellow card in the second round, Freire lost the fight via unanimous decision after being knocked down and largely dominated in every round.

=== Post-Rizin GP ===
In the first fight after the Rizin Lightweight Grand Prix, Freire was expected to headline Bellator Dublin 2 against Peter Queally on October 3, 2020. However, Queally was forced to withdraw from the bout due to a hand injury. Freire was subsequently rebooked to face Jaleel Willis two weeks later at Bellator 249 on October 15, 2020. In turn, this bout was cancelled the day of the event when the Mohegan Tribal Athletic Commission deemed Freire unable to compete due to what was termed an undisclosed medical issue.

Freire faced Peter Queally at Bellator 258 on May 7, 2021. After sustaining a cut on his forehead from an elbow while Queally was on the bottom, the doctor stopped the fight between rounds after the cutman was unable to stop the bleeding.

=== Bellator Lightweight World Champion ===
Freire rematched Peter Queally at Bellator 270 on November 5, 2021. On October 6, 2021, Patricky's younger brother and Bellator MMA Lightweight Champion Patrício Pitbull announced he vacated the title and that the rematch with Queally would be for the Bellator Lightweight World Championship. Freire won the bout via second-round technical knockout to become Bellator Lightweight World Champion.

Freire was scheduled to make the first defence of the Bellator Lightweight World Championship against Sidney Outlaw on July 22, 2022, at Bellator 283. On July 4, it was announced that Patricky had sustained an injury and that the bout would be scrapped.

Freire then made his first defence, against Usman Nurmagomedov on November 18, 2022, at Bellator 288. He lost the fight and the belt via unanimous decision after a one-sided fight.

==== Lightweight Grand Prix ====
On January 11, 2023, Freire was announced as one of the 8 participants in the $1 million Lightweight Grand Prix.

Freire was scheduled to face A.J. McKee in the Bellator Lightweight World Grand Prix Quarter-Final as part of Bellator MMA x Rizin 2 on July 30, 2023. However, on July 26, it was announced McKee had pulled out of the bout due to an injury, and that he was replaced by Rizin Lightweight Champion Roberto de Souza. Freire won the bout by a leg kick technical knockout.

In the semifinals, Freire faced Alexandr Shabliy on November 17, 2023, at Bellator 301. In dominant fashion, Shabliy beat Patricky via unanimous decision, gathering all 50-45 scorecards from the judges.

=== PFL ===
Freire started the 2024 season with a bout against Clay Collard on April 12, 2024, at PFL 2. He lost the fight by second-round technical knockout.

Freire faced Bruno Miranda on June 21, 2024, at PFL 5. He lost the bout via split decision.

On January 21, 2025, Patricky announced that he had been released from his PFL contract per his request and signed with the Global Fight League. However, in April 2025, it was reported that all GFL events were cancelled indefinitely.

Freire faced Shunta Nomura on July 27, 2025, at Super Rizin 4, and lost the bout via unanimous decision.

Freire faced Yoshinori Horie on April 12, 2026, at Rizin Landmark 13. He lost the bout via split decision.

== Grappling career ==
Freire faced Arman Tsarukyan in the main event of ADXC 10 on May 31, 2025. He lost the match by submission with a rear-naked choke.

== Championships and awards ==
- Bellator MMA
  - Bellator Lightweight World Championship (One time)
  - Bellator Season Four Lightweight Tournament Runner-Up
  - Bellator Season Ten Lightweight Tournament Runner-Up
  - Tied (Michael Page) for most knockout wins in Bellator history (11)
  - Most knockout wins in Bellator Lightweight division history (11)
  - Most fights in Bellator Lightweight division history (25)
    - Second most fights in Bellator history (25)
  - Most wins in Bellator Lightweight division history (16)
  - Most stoppage wins in Bellator Lightweight division history (11)
- MMA Junkie
  - January 2016 Knockout of the Month vs. Ryan Couture on January 29
- Rizin Fighting Federation
  - 2019 Rizin Lightweight Grand Prix Runner-Up

== Mixed martial arts record ==
Professional record breakdown
41 matches	25 wins	16 losses
By knockout	17	4
By submission	1	1
By decision	7	11

Res.	Record	Opponent	Method	Event	Date	Round	Time	Location	Notes
Loss	25–16	Yoshinori Horie	Decision (split)	Rizin Landmark 13	April 12, 2026	3	5:00	Fukuoka, Japan	
Loss	25–15	Shunta Nomura	Decision (unanimous)	Super Rizin 4	July 27, 2025	3	5:00	Saitama, Japan	
Loss	25–14	Bruno Miranda	Decision (split)	PFL 5 (2024)	June 21, 2024	3	5:00	Salt Lake City, Utah, United States	
Loss	25–13	Clay Collard	TKO (punches)	PFL 2 (2024)	April 12, 2024	2	1:32	Las Vegas, Nevada, United States	
Loss	25–12	Alexandr Shabliy	Decision (unanimous)	Bellator 301	November 17, 2023	5	5:00	Chicago, Illinois, United States	Bellator Lightweight World Grand Prix Semifinal.
Win	25–11	Roberto de Souza	TKO (leg kick)	Bellator MMA x Rizin 2	July 30, 2023	3	0:49	Saitama, Japan	Catchweight (161 lb) bout. Bellator Lightweight World Grand Prix Quarterfinal.
Loss	24–11	Usman Nurmagomedov	Decision (unanimous)	Bellator 288	November 18, 2022	5	5:00	Chicago, Illinois, United States	Lost the Bellator Lightweight World Championship.
Win	24–10	Peter Queally	TKO (punches)	Bellator 270	November 5, 2021	2	1:05	Dublin, Ireland	Won the vacant Bellator Lightweight World Championship.
Loss	23–10	Peter Queally	TKO (doctor stoppage)	Bellator 258	May 7, 2021	2	5:00	Uncasville, Connecticut, United States	
Loss	23–9	Tofiq Musayev	Decision (unanimous)	Rizin 20	December 31, 2019	3	5:00	Saitama, Japan	2019 Rizin Lightweight Grand Prix Final.
Win	23–8	Luiz Gustavo	TKO (punches and soccer kick)	Rizin 20	December 31, 2019	1	0:28	Saitama, Japan	2019 Rizin Lightweight Grand Prix Semifinal.
Win	22–8	Tatsuya Kawajiri	KO (flying knee and punches)	Rizin 19	October 12, 2019	1	1:10	Osaka, Japan	2019 Rizin Lightweight Grand Prix Quarterfinal.
Win	21–8	Ryan Scope	Decision (split)	Bellator Newcastle	February 9, 2019	3	5:00	Newcastle upon Tyne, England	
Win	20–8	Roger Huerta	KO (punch)	Bellator 205	September 21, 2018	2	0:43	Boise, Idaho, United States	
Win	19–8	Derek Campos	TKO (punches)	Bellator 194	February 16, 2018	1	2:23	Uncasville, Connecticut, United States	
Win	18–8	Benson Henderson	Decision (split)	Bellator 183	September 24, 2017	3	5:00	San Jose, California, United States	
Win	17–8	Josh Thomson	KO (punch)	Bellator 172	February 18, 2017	2	0:40	San Jose, California, United States	
Loss	16–8	Michael Chandler	KO (punch)	Bellator 157: Dynamite 2	June 24, 2016	1	2:14	St. Louis, Missouri, United States	For the vacant Bellator Lightweight World Championship.
Win	16–7	Kevin Souza	Decision (unanimous)	Bellator 152	April 16, 2016	3	5:00	Turin, Italy	
Win	15–7	Ryan Couture	KO (punch)	Bellator 148	January 29, 2016	1	3:00	Fresno, California, United States	
Loss	14–7	Derek Anderson	Decision (split)	Bellator 147	December 4, 2015	3	5:00	San Jose, California, United States	
Win	14–6	Saad Awad	Decision (unanimous)	Bellator 141	August 28, 2015	3	5:00	Temecula, California, United States	
Loss	13–6	Marcin Held	Decision (unanimous)	Bellator 126	September 26, 2014	3	5:00	Phoenix, Arizona, United States	Bellator Season Ten Lightweight Tournament Final.
Win	13–5	Derek Campos	TKO (punches)	Bellator 117	April 18, 2014	2	0:52	Council Bluffs, Iowa, United States	Bellator Season Ten Lightweight Tournament Semifinal.
Win	12–5	David Rickels	KO (punches)	Bellator 113	March 21, 2014	2	0:54	Mulvane, Kansas, United States	Bellator Season Ten Lightweight Tournament Quarterfinal.
Win	11–5	Edson Berto	Decision (unanimous)	Bellator 107	November 8, 2013	3	5:00	Thackerville, Oklahoma, United States	
Loss	10–5	Derek Anderson	Decision (unanimous)	Bellator 98	September 7, 2013	3	5:00	Uncasville, Connecticut, United States	
Loss	10–4	Eddie Alvarez	KO (head kick and punches)	Bellator 76	October 12, 2012	1	4:54	Windsor, Ontario, Canada	
Loss	10–3	Lloyd Woodard	Submission (kimura)	Bellator 62	March 23, 2012	2	1:46	Laredo, Texas, United States	Bellator Season Six Lightweight Tournament Quarterfinal.
Win	10–2	Kurt Pellegrino	TKO (punches)	Bellator 59	November 26, 2011	1	0:50	Atlantic City, New Jersey, United States	
Loss	9–2	Michael Chandler	Decision (unanimous)	Bellator 44	May 14, 2011	3	5:00	Atlantic City, New Jersey, United States	Bellator Season Four Lightweight Tournament Final.
Win	9–1	Toby Imada	KO (flying knee and punches)	Bellator 39	April 2, 2011	1	2:53	Uncasville, Connecticut, United States	Bellator Season Four Lightweight Tournament Semifinal.
Win	8–1	Rob McCullough	TKO (punches)	Bellator 36	March 12, 2011	3	3:11	Shreveport, Louisiana, United States	Bellator Season Four Lightweight Tournament Quarterfinal.
Win	7–1	Yure Machado	Decision (unanimous)	Arena Gold Fights 2	July 17, 2010	3	5:00	Curitiba, Brazil	
Win	6–1	Marlon Medeiros	TKO (flying knee and punches)	Platinum Fight Brazil 3	May 20, 2010	2	N/A	São Paulo, Brazil	
Win	5–1	Emerson Queiroz	Submission (guillotine choke)	Gouveia FC 1	April 8, 2010	2	N/A	Natal, Brazil	
Loss	4–1	Willamy Freire	Technical Decision (unanimous)	Rino's FC 4	September 27, 2007	3	1:45	Fortaleza, Brazil	
Win	4–0	Maykon Costa	Decision (unanimous)	Leal Combat: Natal	July 5, 2007	3	5:00	Natal, Brazil	
Win	3–0	Joao Paulo Rodrigues	KO (stomps)	Cage Fight Nordeste	November 9, 2006	1	0:50	Natal, Brazil	
Win	2–0	Gleidson Alves Martins	KO (punches)	Fight Ship Looking Boy 2	November 22, 2005	3	N/A	Natal, Brazil	
Win	1–0	Arquimedes Vieira	KO (stomps)	Fight Ship Looking Boy 1	September 8, 2005	1	N/A	Natal, Brazil	
