= Bellator MMA x Rizin 2 =

Bellator and Rizin mixed martial arts event in 2022

- Promotion(s): Bellator MMA; Rizin Fighting Federation
- Date: July 30, 2023
- City: Saitama, Japan
- Venue: Saitama Super Arena

Bellator MMA events chronology
← Previous; Bellator 297: Nemkov vs. Romero	Next → Bellator 298: Storley vs. Ward

Rizin events chronology
← Previous; Rizin 43 – Sapporo	Next → Rizin 44

Bellator MMA x Rizin 2 and Super Rizin 2 was a mixed martial arts event co-promoted by Bellator MMA and the Rizin Fighting Federation that took place on July 30, 2023, at the Saitama Super Arena in Saitama, Japan.

== Background ==
The event marked the second co-promotion between Bellator MMA and the Rizin Fighting Federation, and Bellator's third visit to Saitama; following Bellator MMA vs. Rizin in December 2022, and Bellator 237 on December 29, 2019.

A Bellator Lightweight World Grand Prix quarterfinal bout between former Bellator Featherweight Champion A. J. McKee and former Bellator Lightweight Champion Patricky Pitbull was scheduled to headline the event. However, on July 26, it was announced that McKee had pulled out of the bout due to medical issues and was replaced by the incumbent Rizin Lightweight Champion Roberto de Souza at a catchweight of 161 pounds.

For the co-main event, an inaugural Bellator Flyweight Championship bout between former Bellator Bantamweight Champion Kyoji Horiguchi (also former two-time Rizin Bantamweight Champion) and Makoto Takahashi took place at the event. If successful, Horiguchi would have become the fourth fighter in Bellator history to win a title in different divisions (after Joe Warren at Bellator 128, Ryan Bader at Bellator 214, and Patrício Pitbull at Bellator 221).

A Rizin Bantamweight Championship bout for the vacant title between former Bellator Bantamweight Champion Juan Archuleta and former champion Kai Asakura was scheduled to take place at the event. Former champion Kyoji Horiguchi vacated the title on December 22 after moving down to the flyweight division. However, on July 18 it was announced that Asakura withdrew due to injury and was replaced by Hiromasa Ougikubo.

== Results ==
Part 1: Bellator MMA x Rizin 2 (Showtime)
Weight class				Method	Round	Time	Notes
Catchweight (161 lb)	Patricky Pitbull	def.	Roberto de Souza	TKO (leg kick)	3	0:49	(Note: Bellator Lightweight World Grand Prix Quarterfinal.)
Flyweight	Kyoji Horiguchi	vs.	Makoto Takahashi	No Contest (accidental eye poke)	1	0:25	(Note: For the inaugural Bellator Flyweight World Championship. Accidental eye poke rendered Takahashi unable to continue.)
Women's Flyweight	Kana Watanabe	def.	Veta Arteaga	Decision (unanimous) (29–28, 29–28, 29–28)	3	5:00
Bantamweight	Magomed Magomedov	def.	Danny Sabatello	Submission (guillotine choke)	1	3:55
Welterweight	Andrey Koreshkov	def.	Lorenz Larkin	Decision (split) (29–28, 29–28, 28–29)	3	5:00
Part 2: Super Rizin 2 (FiteTV PPV)
Featherweight	Vugar Keramov	def.	Mikuru Asakura	Submission (rear-naked choke)	1	2:41	(Note: For the vacant Rizin Featherweight Championship.)
Bantamweight	Juan Archuleta	def.	Hiromasa Ougikubo	Decision (unanimous)	3	5:00	(Note: For the vacant Rizin Bantamweight Championship.)
Super Atomweight	Seika Izawa (c)	def.	Claire Lopez	Submission (ninja choke)	1	1:06	(Note: For the Rizin Women's Super Atomweight Championship.)
Intermission
Catchweight (154 lb)	Chihiro Suzuki	def.	Patrício Pitbull	KO (punch)	1	2:32
Lightweight	Tofiq Musayev	def.	Akira Okada	KO (punches)	2	1:11
Bantamweight	Shinobu Ota	def.	Kenta Takizawa	TKO (punches)	1	4:54
Middleweight	Igor Tanabe	def.	Daichi Abe	Submission (heel hook)	1	4:34
Catchweight (128 lb)	Yuki Ito	def.	Hiroya Kondo	Decision (split)	3	5:00

== See also ==
- List of current Bellator MMA fighters
- List of current Rizin FF fighters
- 2023 in Bellator MMA
- 2023 in Rizin Fighting Federation
- List of Bellator MMA events
