= Alexandr Shabliy =

Russian mixed martial arts fighter

- Born: Alexandr Shabliy; April 18, 1993 (age 33); Rostov-on-Don, Russia
- Native name: Александр Шаблий
- Other names: Peresvet
- Nationality: Russian
- Height: 5 ft 9.25 in (1.76 m)
- Weight: 155 lb (70 kg; 11 st 1 lb)
- Division: Lightweight
- Reach: 70.5 in (179 cm)
- Fighting out of: Rostov-on-Don, Russia
- Team: Peresvet FT
- Years active: 2010–present

Mixed martial arts record
- Total: 29
- Wins: 25
- By knockout: 12
- By submission: 7
- By decision: 6
- Losses: 4
- By submission: 1
- By decision: 3

Other information
- Mixed martial arts record from Sherdog

Alexandr Shabliy (born April 18, 1993) is a Russian mixed martial artist who competes in the Lightweight division of the Professional Fighters League. As of February 12, 2026, he is #5 in the PFL lightweight rankings.

== Background ==
Alexander was born in the city of Rostov-on-Don to a Cossack father and a Dargin mother, Shabliy practices Eastern Orthodoxy. With his grandfather’s lineage being Cossack, he incorporates into his post-fight speeches by the way of his headgear. In parallel with going to first grade, his parents enrolled him in the Shotokan karate section, where the guy went three times a week. He achieved good results in sports, and graduated from school with good marks.

A key role in the development of Sasha as a fighter was played by his coach, Belousov Nikolai Pavlovich, who directed his student in the right direction and introduced him to mixed martial arts, which was encouraged by his father. Despite the fact that the house of the Shabliyev family burned down and they were forced to move to a hostel, Vasily found an opportunity to reward his son for the victory with a small amount of money.

Over time, along with his friend, Alexander switched to boxing, then to Thai boxing, and after that - combat sambo and hand-to-hand combat.

== Mixed martial arts career ==
=== Early career ===
But, by the time he came of age, he was first invited to the ProFC event, where he made his lightweight debut as a professional MMA fighter. But, in parallel with this career, he managed to take care of his personal life, education and a good position.

The first 4 fights under the auspices of the domestic promotion, which Shabliy completed quite quickly, finishing his opponents with three submissions and one technical knockout. But in October 2011, he suffered his first loss to Mamour Fall, although the fight was very close and he lost by split decision. After, the athlete tried himself in the Oplot Challenge, but eventually returned to ProFC, starting to smash both foreign and Russian fighters there.

Arsen Ubaidulaev became the second opponent to defeat him, submitting Shabliy with a rear-naked choke. However, Alexander rematched Arsen and knocked him out with a flying knee in the first round. Then, the prospect racked up victories after victories, and entered such leagues as ACB and Fight Nights Global. There he had a chance to meet with more serious opposition, but only Eduard Vartanyan managed to stop the representative of the Peresvet team, beating him by the way of split decision.

Having scored a solid record in Russia, Shabliy decided to temporarily move to the United States in order to gain experience from Western colleagues, and to try to sign with a Western promotion. When the arrival to the States took place, the athlete was accepted into the American Top Team, where he trained for 4 months, but he did not succeed in becoming part of a major promotion. As the pandemic hit, Alexander had to return to his homeland.

However, after a short period of time, his manager went to Bellator, and after fruitful negotiations, the parties managed to come to a common denominator.

=== Bellator MMA ===
In February 2021, it was announced that Shabliy had signed a multi-fight deal with Bellator MMA.

He made his promotional debut on May 21, 2021, at Bellator 259, defeating Alfie Davis, a Briton with 4 win streak, via unanimous decision.

In his sophomore performance, Shabliy faced Bobby King on December 3, 2021, at Bellator 279, defeating his opponent via unanimous decision.

Shabliy faced former Lightweight champion Brent Primus at Bellator 282 on June 24, 2022. He picked up his first stoppage in the promotion, winning the bout via TKO in the second round.

==== Bellator Lightweight World Grand Prix ====
On January 11, 2023, Shabliy was announced as one of the 8 participants in the $1 million Lightweight Grand Prix, with his quarterfinal bout against Tofiq Musayev taking place on March 10, 2023, at Bellator 292. Shabliy won the bout in the third round, finishing Musayev with a body kick that rendered him unable to continue.

In the semifinals, Shabliy faced former Lightweight champion Patricky Pitbull on November 17, 2023, at Bellator 301. In dominant fashion, Shabliy beat Patricky via unanimous decision, gathering all 50-45 scorecards from the judges.

Shabliy was scheduled to face Usman Nurmagomedov for the Bellator Lightweight Championship on May 17, 2024, at Bellator Champions Series 2. However, Nurmagomedov withdrew due to injury and the bout was scrapped. The bout was rescheduled and eventually took place on September 7, 2024 at Bellator Champions Series 4. Shabliy lost the fight by unanimous decision.

=== Professional Fighters League ===
On February 26, 2025, the promotion officially revealed that Shabliy was joins the 2025 PFL Lightweight Tournament.

In the quarterfinal, Shabliy was scheduled to face Brent Primus on April 18, 2025, at PFL 3. However, Shabliy withdrew from the tournament due to undisclosed reasons and was replaced by Vinicius Sacchelli Cenci.

On June 4, it was announced that Shabliy had tested positive for recombinant erythropoietin (rEPO) as the result of an out-of-competition sample collected on March 19, 2025. USADA gave him a six month suspension that began on March 19 and will end on September 19, 2025.

Shabliy was scheduled to face Acoidan Duque on March 20, 2026, at PFL Madrid. However, the bout was removed from the event for unknown reasons.

Shabliy rematched against Alfie Davis on June 27, 2026, at PFL San Diego. He won the fight via unanimous decision.

Shabliy was scheduled to face Landry Ward on October 16, 2026, at PFL Chicago 2. However, the bout was removed from the event for unknown reasons.

== Personal life ==
The athlete is married to a girl named Maria, whom they married when he was 20 years old, and the couple has two sons - Timur and Dima. In addition, along with the career of a deputy, Shabliy became the director of the very ProFC league in which he began his fighting path. Shabliy studied at the Russian State University of Justice, where he study a degree of law, which he uses as a deputy of the Rostov City Duma.

== Mixed martial arts record ==
Professional record breakdown
| 29 matches | 25 wins | 4 losses |
| By knockout | 12 | 0 |
| By submission | 7 | 1 |
| By decision | 6 | 3 |

| Res. | Record | Opponent | Method | Event | Date | Round | Time | Location | Notes |
|---|---|---|---|---|---|---|---|---|---|
| Win | 25–4 | Alfie Davis | Decision (unanimous) | PFL San Diego: McKee vs. Isbulaev | June 27, 2026 | 3 | 5:00 | San Diego, California, United States | |
| Loss | 24–4 | Usman Nurmagomedov | Decision (unanimous) | Bellator Champions Series 4 | September 7, 2024 | 5 | 5:00 | San Diego, California, United States | For the Bellator Lightweight World Championship. |
| Win | 24–3 | Patricky Pitbull | Decision (unanimous) | Bellator 301 | November 17, 2023 | 5 | 5:00 | Chicago, Illinois, United States | Bellator Lightweight World Grand Prix Semifinal. |
| Win | 23–3 | Tofiq Musayev | TKO (body kick) | Bellator 292 | March 10, 2023 | 3 | 0:29 | San Jose, California, United States | Bellator Lightweight World Grand Prix Quarterfinal. |
| Win | 22–3 | Brent Primus | TKO (punches) | Bellator 282 | June 24, 2022 | 2 | 1:22 | Uncasville, Connecticut, United States | |
| Win | 21–3 | Bobby King | Decision (unanimous) | Bellator 272 | December 3, 2021 | 3 | 5:00 | Uncasville, Connecticut, United States | |
| Win | 20–3 | Alfie Davis | Decision (unanimous) | Bellator 259 | May 21, 2021 | 3 | 5:00 | Uncasville, Connecticut, United States | |
| Win | 19–3 | Alexandre Cidade | Decision (unanimous) | ProFC 66 | December 22, 2019 | 3 | 5:00 | Rostov-on-Don, Russia | |
| Win | 18–3 | Adriano Martins | Decision (unanimous) | Fight Nights Global 87 | May 19, 2018 | 3 | 5:00 | Rostov-on-Don, Russia | |
| Win | 17–3 | Miroslav Štrbák | KO (punch) | Fight Nights Global 82 | December 16, 2017 | 2 | 3:02 | Moscow, Russia | |
| Win | 16–3 | Gleristone Santos | KO (knee and punches) | ACB 67 | August 19, 2017 | 1 | 2:41 | Grozny, Russia | Knockout of the Night. |
| Loss | 15–3 | Eduard Vartanyan | Decision (split) | ACB 49 | November 26, 2016 | 3 | 5:00 | Rostov-on-Don, Russia | Fight of the Night. |
| Win | 15–2 | Michael Brightmon | TKO (punches) | ACB 41 | July 15, 2016 | 1 | 1:07 | Sochi, Russia | |
| Win | 14–2 | Ryan Quinn | KO (head kick) | WFCA 16 | March 12, 2016 | 3 | 0:13 | Grozny, Russia | |
| Win | 13–2 | Haotian Wu | TKO (punches) | Kunlun Fight 29 | August 15, 2015 | 1 | 3:05 | Sochi, Russia | |
| Win | 12–2 | Gusein Esenbaev | TKO (flying knee & punches) | ProFC 57 | March 29, 2015 | 1 | 4:07 | Rostov-on-Don, Russia | |
| Win | 11–2 | Haitham ElSayed | Submission (heel hook) | ProFC 56 | November 22, 2014 | 1 | 1:29 | Kursk, Russia | |
| Win | 10–2 | Luca Puggioni | Submission (heel hook) | ProFC 55 | October 19, 2014 | 1 | 1:09 | Krasnodar, Russia | |
| Win | 9–2 | Arsen Ubaidulaev | KO (flying knee) | ProFC 53 | April 6, 2014 | 1 | 1:48 | Rostov-on-Don, Russia | |
| Loss | 8–2 | Arsen Ubaidulaev | Submission (rear-naked choke) | ProFC 49 | July 4, 2013 | 2 | 2:18 | Khimki, Russia | |
| Win | 8–1 | Michael Doyle | TKO (punches) | ProFC 47 | April 14, 2013 | 1 | 0:34 | Rostov-on-Don, Russia | |
| Win | 7–1 | Tarkan Ali Erokcu | TKO (punches) | ProFC 45 | December 15, 2012 | 1 | 0:17 | Grozny, Russia | |
| Win | 6–1 | Arvydas Zilius | Submission (armbar) | ProFC 41 | August 24, 2012 | 1 | 1:53 | Rostov-on-Don, Russia | |
| Win | 5–1 | Abudokar Dukarey | Submission (triangle choke) | Oplot Challenge 1 | March 25, 2012 | 1 | 1:05 | Kharkiv, Ukraine | |
| Loss | 4–1 | Mamour Fall | Decision (split) | ProFC 36 | October 22, 2011 | 3 | 5:00 | Khasavyurt, Russia | |
| Win | 4–0 | Łukasz Bugara | Submission (guillotine choke) | ProFC 30 | August 5, 2011 | 1 | 0:49 | Rostov-on-Don, Russia | |
| Win | 3–0 | Denis Aleksandrov | Submission (rear-naked choke) | ProFC 29 | July 2, 2011 | 2 | 3:57 | Rostov-on-Don, Russia | |
| Win | 2–0 | Semen Selyukov | TKO (punches) | ProFC 26 | April 8, 2011 | 2 | 0:36 | Rostov-on-Don, Russia | |
| Win | 1–0 | Vahe Zakaryan | Submission (guillotine choke) | ProFC 18 | October 21, 2010 | 1 | 1:23 | Nalchik, Russia | |

== See also ==
- List of current Bellator fighters
- List of male mixed martial artists
