= Sahil (name) =

Sahil is a male given name.

== Notable people with the name ==
- Afroz Alam Sahil, Indian journalist
- Sahil Anand, Indian actor
- Sahil Babayev, Azerbaijani government minister
- Sahil Deshmukh Khan, Indian actor
- Sahil Gupta, Indian cricketer
- Sahil Khan, Indian actor
- Sahil Khattar, Indian actor
- Sahil Mehta (actor, born 1988), Indian actor
- Sahil Panwar, Indian footballer
- Sahil Patel, South African cricketer
- Sahil Salathia, Indian actor
- Sahil Sandhu, Canadian soccer player
- Sahil Sharma, Indian cricketer
- Sahil Shroff, Indian actor
- Sahil Suhaimi, Singaporean cricketer
- Sahil Tavora, Indian footballer
- Sahil Uppal, Indian actor
- Sahil Vaid, Indian actor
- Sheikh Sahil, Indian footballer
- Syed Sahil Agha, Indian author

== See also ==
- Sahel (disambiguation)
- Sahel
