= Sahel, Mali =

Sahel
- Commune
- Location in Mali
- Coordinates: 15°22′34″N 11°28′26″W
- Country: Mali
- Region: Kayes Region
- Cercle: Kayes Cercle

Area
  - Total: 860 km^{2} (330 sq mi)

Population (2009 census)
  - Total: 11,630
  - Density: 14/km^{2} (35/sq mi)
- Time zone: UTC+0 (GMT)

Sahel is a commune in the Cercle of Kayes in the Kayes Region of south-western Mali. The main village (chef-lieu) is Bafarara. In 2009 the commune had a population of 11,630.
