= Bellator 297 =

2023 mixed martial arts event

Bellator 297: Nemkov vs. Romero
- The poster for Bellator 297: Nemkov vs. Romero
- Promotion: Bellator MMA
- Date: June 16, 2023
- Venue: Wintrust Arena
- City: Chicago, Illinois, United States

Event chronology
| Bellator 296: Mousasi vs. Edwards | Bellator 297: Nemkov vs. Romero | Bellator MMA x Rizin 2 |

Bellator 297: Nemkov vs. Romero was a mixed martial arts event produced by Bellator MMA that took place on June 16, 2023, at the Wintrust Arena in Chicago, Illinois, United States.

== Background ==
The event marked the promotion's fifth visit to Chicago and first since Bellator 288 in November 2022.

A Bellator Light Heavyweight Championship bout between current champion Vadim Nemkov and Yoel Romero headlined the event. They were previously expected to meet at Bellator 290 but Nemkov withdrew due to undisclosed reasons.

For the co-main event, a Bellator Bantamweight Championship bout between current champion Sergio Pettis and the current Bellator Featherweight Champion Patrício Pitbull (also former Bellator Lightweight Champion) took place. This was the third time in Bellator history that champions in different divisions fought for the same title, following Bellator 206 and Bellator 221 (the latter event in which Pitbull defeated Michael Chandler to become the simultaneous featherweight and lightweight champion).

If successful, Pitbull would have become the first man to become a three division champion in a major MMA organization, the first man to become champion in two divisions simultaneously twice, and that his win would have mark the fourth time overall where a fighter has won a title in different divisions (after Joe Warren at Bellator 128, Ryan Bader at Bellator 214, and Pitbull at Bellator 221). Meanwhile, Pitbull also became the first challenger in a Bellator champion vs. champion bout to drop a division.

A welterweight bout between Bobby Nash and Roman Faraldo was scheduled for this event. In the beginning of May, it was announced that Faraldo had pulled out of the bout and replaced by Kyle Crutchmer.

A middleweight bout between Austin Vanderford and Imamshafi Aliev and a bantamweight bout between Leandro Higo and Nikita Mikhailov were scheduled for this event. However, both bouts were scrapped for unknown reasons for the middleweight bout and illness for Mikhailov for the bantamweight one.

== Results ==
Main Card (Showtime)
| Weight class | | | | Method | Round | Time | Notes |
|---|---|---|---|---|---|---|---|
| Light Heavyweight | Vadim Nemkov (c) | def. | Yoel Romero | Decision (unanimous) (49–46, 49–46, 49–46) | 5 | 5:00 | (Note: For the Bellator Light Heavyweight World Championship) |
| Bantamweight | Sergio Pettis (c) | def. | Patrício Pitbull | Decision (unanimous) (49–46, 50–45, 50–45) | 5 | 5:00 | (Note: For the Bellator Bantamweight World Championship.) |
| Light Heavyweight | Corey Anderson | def. | Phil Davis | Decision (split) (29–28, 28–29, 29–28) | 3 | 5:00 |
| Heavyweight | Gökhan Saricam | def. | Daniel James | Decision (unanimous) (30–27, 30–27, 30–27) | 3 | 5:00 |
Preliminary card (Youtube/Pluto TV)
| Lightweight | Gadzhi Rabadanov | def. | Pieter Buist | Decision (unanimous) (29–28, 29–28, 29–28) | 3 | 5:00 |
| Welterweight | Ramazan Kuramagomedov | def. | Jaleel Willis | KO (knee and punches) | 1 | 1:24 |
| Middleweight | Norbert Növényi Jr. | def. | Kamil Oniszczuk | KO (punches) | 1 | 0:46 |
| Lightweight | Archie Colgan | def. | Emmanuel Sanchez | Decision (unanimous) (30–27, 30–27, 30–27) | 3 | 5:00 |
| Middleweight | Jordan Newman | def. | Matthew Perry | Submission (keylock) | 1 | 4:20 |
| Featherweight | Cody Law | def. | Edwin Chavez | Decision (unanimous) (30–27, 30–27, 29–28) | 3 | 5:00 |
Postliminary card (Youtube)
| Heavyweight | Wladmir Gouvea | def. | Gabriel Sayeg | KO (body kick and punches) | 1 | 0:20 |
| Welterweight | Kyle Crutchmer | def. | Bobby Nash | TKO (punches) | 1 | 3:42 |
| Lightweight | Mike Hamel | def. | Shamil Nikaev | Decision (majority) (28–28, 29–28, 29–28) | 3 | 5:00 |
| Light Heavyweight | Karl Moore | def. | Alex Polizzi | Decision (unanimous) (29–28, 29–28, 29–28) | 3 | 5:00 |
| Featherweight | Timur Khizriev | def. | Richie Smullen | Decision (unanimous) (30–27, 30–27, 30–27) | 3 | 5:00 |

== See also ==
- 2023 in Bellator MMA
- List of Bellator MMA events
- List of current Bellator fighters
