= Liz Carmouche =

American mixed martial arts fighter (born 1984)

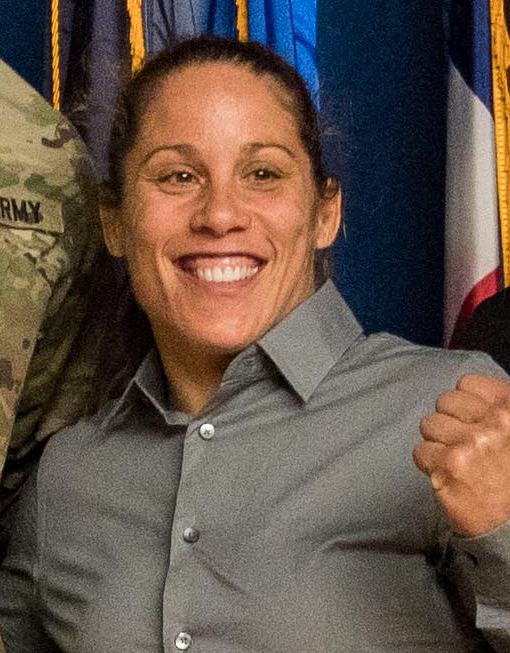
- Carmouche in 2019
- Born: February 19, 1984 (age 42); Lafayette, Louisiana, U.S.
- Other names: Girl-Rilla
- Height: 5 ft 6 in (1.68 m)
- Weight: 125 lb (57 kg; 8.9 st)
- Division: Bantamweight; Flyweight
- Reach: 66 in (168 cm)
- Fighting out of: San Diego, California, U.S.
- Team: Team Hurricane Awesome
- Trainer: Manolo Hernandez
- Rank: Black belt in 10th Planet Jiu-Jitsu; Yellow belt in American Kenpo
- Years active: 2010–present

Mixed martial arts record
- Total: 35
- Wins: 26
- By knockout: 11
- By submission: 7
- By decision: 8
- Losses: 9
- By submission: 2
- By decision: 7

Other information
- Mixed martial arts record from Sherdog
- Military career
- Allegiance: United States
- Branch: United States Marine Corps
- Service years: 2004–2009
- Conflicts: War in Afghanistan; Iraq War

Liz Carmouche (born February 19, 1984) is an American mixed martial arts fighter currently competing in the women’s Flyweight division of the Professional Fighters League (PFL), where she was the 2025 PFL Women’s Flyweight Tournament Champion. As of January 27, 2026, she is #2 in the PFL women's flyweight rankings. She formerly competed in Bellator MMA, where she was the last Bellator Women's Flyweight World Champion. Carmouche also competed for the Ultimate Fighting Championship (UFC) in the Women's Flyweight and Women's Bantamweight divisions, being a championship challenger for both divisions. At the time of her UFC departure, she was #4 in the UFC women's flyweight rankings.

Carmouche competed in the first ever women's MMA match in the UFC when she competed against Ronda Rousey for the UFC Women's Bantamweight Championship at UFC 157. A two-time title challenger, Carmouche also challenged for the UFC Women's Flyweight Championship in August 2019 against Valentina Shevchenko. Carmouche was the first openly lesbian fighter in the UFC and was praised by company president Dana White for coming out.

== Early life and military service ==
Carmouche was born in Lafayette, Louisiana, and grew up in Okinawa, Japan. She is of Lebanese, Irish and Cajun French descent. She went to Okinawa Christian School International in Japan graduating in the class of 2003.

Prior to becoming a professional MMA fighter, Carmouche spent five years in the Marine Corps as an aviation electrician during which she did three tours of duty in the Middle East. Her nickname is Girl-Rilla, earned from her muscular physique and strength that outperforms male counterparts. She currently resides in San Diego, California, and trains at San Diego Combat Academy. She is currently attending San Diego City College studying Kinesiology.

== Mixed martial arts career ==
=== Early career ===
Carmouche started her professional career in 2010, winning her first three fights via knockout or submission.

=== Strikeforce ===
On August 13, 2010, she made her Strikeforce debut at Strikeforce Challengers 10 in a reserve bout for their one-night Women's Welterweight tournament. She defeated Colleen Schneider via unanimous decision after two rounds.

Carmouche returned to the promotion at Strikeforce Challengers 12 on November 19, 2010, where she defeated Jan Finney via TKO in the third round.

On February 23, 2011, it was announced that number one title contender Miesha Tate had suffered a knee injury and that Carmouche would step in on short notice to face Women's Bantamweight (135 lbs) champion Marloes Coenen on March 5, 2011, at Strikeforce: Feijao vs. Henderson. Carmouche was defeated via triangle choke in the fourth round, after dominating two of the previous rounds.

On July 22, 2011, Carmouche faced Sarah Kaufman at Strikeforce Challengers: Voelker vs. Bowling III in Las Vegas, Nevada. She was defeated by unanimous decision.

Carmouche was scheduled to return to Strikeforce to face Sara McMann at Strikeforce: Cormier vs. Mir on November 3, 2012, but the event was cancelled.

=== Invicta Fighting Championships ===
Carmouche faced Ashleigh Curry at Invicta Fighting Championships 1 on April 28, 2012. She won the fight via TKO in the first round.

Carmouche faced Kaitlin Young at Invicta Fighting Championships 2 on July 28, 2012. She won the fight via submission due to a rear-naked choke in the second round.

=== Ultimate Fighting Championship ===
It was announced at the UFC on Fox: Henderson vs. Diaz pre-fight press conference by UFC President Dana White that former Strikeforce Women's Bantamweight Champion Ronda Rousey would be the very first UFC Women's Bantamweight Champion. It was confirmed by White that Carmouche would be challenging Rousey for the Women's Bantamweight title at UFC 157. In the early part of the first round, Carmouche locked in a standing rear-naked choke/face crank on Rousey. However, Rousey escaped and eventually finished the fight by armbar with 11 seconds left in the first round.

Carmouche was expected to face Miesha Tate at UFC on Fox 8 on July 27, 2013. However, Tate was pulled from the bout to participate as a coach on The Ultimate Fighter 18. Carmouche instead faced promotional newcomer Jéssica Andrade. She won the fight by TKO in round two, earning her first win inside the Octagon.

In her third UFC fight, Carmouche faced Alexis Davis on November 6, 2013, at UFC Fight Night 31. She lost the fight via unanimous decision.

Carmouche faced Miesha Tate in the co-main event at UFC on Fox 11. She lost the back-and-forth fight via unanimous decision.

Carmouche faced Lauren Murphy on April 4, 2015, at UFC Fight Night 63. She won the fight by unanimous decision. However, 10 out of 13 media outlets scored the bout for Murphy, whilst 3 scored it for Carmouche.

Carmouche faced Katlyn Chookagian on November 12, 2016, at UFC 205. She won the fight via split decision.

==== Flyweight division ====
Carmouche faced Alexis Davis in a women's flyweight bout on December 9, 2017, at UFC Fight Night 123. She lost the fight by split decision.

Carmouche faced Jennifer Maia on July 14, 2018, at UFC Fight Night 133. She won the fight by unanimous decision.

Carmouche faced Lucie Pudilová on February 23, 2019, at UFC Fight Night 145. She won the fight by unanimous decision.

A rematch with Valentina Shevchenko was scheduled on August 10, 2019, at UFC Fight Night 156 for the UFC Women's Flyweight Championship. She lost the fight via unanimous decision.

On December 6, 2019, it was announced that Carmouche had been released from the UFC despite signing a new contract after the failed title bid.

=== Bellator MMA ===
On December 21, 2019, Carmouche was signed by Bellator MMA.

Carmouche was scheduled to make her debut at Bellator against Mandy Böhm on May 29, 2020, at Bellator 243 but the bout was cancelled due to the COVID-19 pandemic. Carmouche made her promotional debut against DeAnna Bennett at Bellator 246 on September 12, 2020. At the weigh-ins, Bennett missed weight, weighing in at 131.7 pounds. The bout proceeded as a catchweight and Carmouche was awarded a percentage of Bennett's purse. Carmouche won the bout via third round submission.

Carmouche faced former Invicta FC Flyweight World Champion Vanessa Porto on April 9, 2021, at Bellator 256. She won the bout via a unanimous decision.

Carmouche faced Kana Watanabe on June 25, 2021, at Bellator 261. She won the bout via TKO within 35 seconds of the first round.

==== Bellator Women's Flyweight World Champion ====
Carmouche faced undefeated flyweight champ, Juliana Velasquez for the Bellator Women's Flyweight World Championship on April 22, 2022, at Bellator 278. She won the bout and the title via elbows from crucifix at the end of the fourth round. Following the bout, Velasquez's team appealed the result on the grounds of refereeing error made by Mike Beltran, but the appeal was denied by the Hawaii State Boxing Commission.

In a title rematch, Carmouche faced Juliana Velasquez again on December 9, 2022, at Bellator 289. She won the fight via an armbar submission in the second round.

Carmouche defended her title in a rematch against DeAnna Bennett on April 21, 2023, at Bellator 294. At the weigh-ins, Bennett weighed in at 126.2 pounds, 1.2 pounds over the title flyweight fight limit. The bout proceeded at catchweight with Bennett being fined 30% of her purse, which went to Carmouche. Carmouche also chose to keep the title on the line, meaning if she lost the fight, the title would have become vacant. She won the fight by an arm-triangle choke submission in the fourth round.

Carmouche defended her title against former champion Ilima-Lei Macfarlane on October 7, 2023, at Bellator 300. At the weigh-ins, Macfarlane came in at 126.6 lb (after coming in at 127.4 lb in her first attempt), 1.6 pounds over the women's flyweight limit for a title fight. The commission gave her an additional hour to cut weight, but Macfarlane came in at 128.2 lb. As a result, the bout proceeded at catchweight, with Carmouche again keeping the title on the line, meaning if she lost the fight, the title would become vacant. Carmouche won the fight via leg kick TKO in the fifth round.

=== Professional Fighters League ===
==== 2024 ====
Carmouche debuted with the Professional Fighters League (PFL) at PFL 1 on April 4, 2024 and won the bout in a third bout against Juliana Velasquez by unanimous decision.

Carmouche faced Kana Watanabe on June 13, 2024 at PFL 4. She won the fight via armbar submission in the third round.

Carmouche faced Taila Santos in the semi-finals of the 2024 Women's Flyweight tournament at PFL 7 on August 2, 2024. At the weigh-ins, Carmouche missed weight by 1 pound, coming in at 127 pounds. Carmouche lost the bout via unanimous decision.

==== 2025 ====
On February 18, 2025, the promotion officially revealed that Carmouche joined the 2025 PFL Women's Flyweight Tournament.

In the quarterfinal, Carmouche faced Ilara Joanne on April 11, 2025, at PFL 2. She won the fight via technical knockout in round one.

In the semifinals, Carmouche faced Elora Dana on June 20, 2025 at PFL 6. She won the fight via unanimous decision.

In the final, Carmouche faced Jena Bishop on August 15, 2025, at PFL 9. She won the bout by knockout in the third round to win the tournament.

==== 2026 ====
Carmouche faced Viviane Araújo on June 27, 2026, at PFL San Diego. She won the fight via a guillotine choke in round two.

Carmouche faced Jena Bishop in a rematch for the inaugural PFL Women's Flyweight Championship on October 16, 2026, at PFL Chicago 2. She lost by unanimous decision with all three cageside judges scoring the fight 47–48.

== Championships and accomplishments ==
- Professional Fighters League
  - 2025 PFL Women's Flyweight Tournament Champion
- Bellator MMA
  - Bellator Women's Flyweight World Championship (One time, current)
    - Three successful title defenses
  - Second most finishes in Bellator Women's Flyweight division history (6)
  - Tied (Sumiko Inaba) for most knockouts in Bellator Women's Flyweight division history (3)
- Fight Matrix
  - 2010 Female Rookie of the Year
- WMMA Press Awards
  - 2010 Newcomer of the Year
- MMA Fighting
  - 2025 First Team MMA All-Star
- Uncrowned
  - 2025 #4 Ranked Women's Fighter of the Year

== Personal life ==
Carmouche is openly lesbian, and has a son with her wife. She has a tattoo on her left side representing the Chinese zodiac symbol of her mother and sister. Carmouche is the spokesperson for Medical Marijuana Inc. on the cannabidiol (CBD) therapeutic benefits for athletes.

== Mixed martial arts record ==
Professional record breakdown
35 matches	26 wins	9 losses
By knockout	11	0
By submission	7	2
By decision	8	7

Res.	Record	Opponent	Method	Event	Date	Round	Time	Location	Notes
Loss	26–9	Jena Bishop	Decision (unanimous)	PFL Chicago: Carmouche vs. Bishop 2	October 16, 2026	5	5:00	Chicago, Illinois, United States	For the inaugural PFL Women's Flyweight Championship.
Win	26–8	Viviane Araújo	Submission (guillotine choke)	PFL San Diego: McKee vs. Isbulaev	June 27, 2026	2	2:07	San Diego, California, United States	
Win	25–8	Jena Bishop	KO (punches)	PFL 9 (2025)	August 15, 2025	3	2:56	Charlotte, North Carolina, United States	Won the 2025 PFL Women's Flyweight Tournament.
Win	24–8	Elora Dana	Decision (unanimous)	PFL 6 (2025)	June 20, 2025	3	5.00	Wichita, Kansas, United States	2025 PFL Women's Flyweight Tournament Semifinal.
Win	23–8	Ilara Joanne	TKO (punches)	PFL 2 (2025)	April 11, 2025	1	2:25	Orlando, Florida, United States	2025 PFL Women's Flyweight Tournament Quarterfinal.
Loss	22–8	Taila Santos	Decision (unanimous)	PFL 7 (2024)	August 2, 2024	3	5:00	Nashville, Tennessee, United States	2024 PFL Women's Flyweight Tournament Semifinal; Carmouche missed weight (127 lb).
Win	22–7	Kana Watanabe	Submission (armbar)	PFL 4 (2024)	June 13, 2024	3	4:52	Uncasville, Connecticut, United States	
Win	21–7	Juliana Velasquez	Decision (unanimous)	PFL 1 (2024)	April 4, 2024	3	5:00	San Antonio, Texas, United States	
Win	20–7	Ilima-Lei Macfarlane	TKO (leg kick)	Bellator 300	October 7, 2023	5	0:17	San Diego, California, United States	Defended the Bellator Women's Flyweight World Championship. Macfarlane missed weight (126.6 lb) and was ineligible for the title.
Win	19–7	DeAnna Bennett	Submission (arm-triangle choke)	Bellator 294	April 21, 2023	4	4:29	Honolulu, Hawaii, United States	Defended the Bellator Women's Flyweight World Championship. Bennett missed weight (126.2 lb) and was ineligible to win the title.
Win	18–7	Juliana Velasquez	Submission (armbar)	Bellator 289	December 9, 2022	2	4:24	Uncasville, Connecticut, United States	Defended the Bellator Women's Flyweight World Championship.
Win	17–7	Juliana Velasquez	TKO (elbows)	Bellator 278	April 22, 2022	4	4:47	Honolulu, Hawaii, United States	Won the Bellator Women's Flyweight World Championship.
Win	16–7	Kana Watanabe	TKO (punches)	Bellator 261	June 25, 2021	1	0:35	Uncasville, Connecticut, United States	
Win	15–7	Vanessa Porto	Decision (unanimous)	Bellator 256	April 9, 2021	3	5:00	Uncasville, Connecticut, United States	
Win	14–7	DeAnna Bennett	Submission (rear-naked choke)	Bellator 246	September 12, 2020	3	3:17	Uncasville, Connecticut, United States	Catchweight (131.7 lbs) bout; Bennett missed weight.
Loss	13–7	Valentina Shevchenko	Decision (unanimous)	UFC Fight Night: Shevchenko vs. Carmouche 2	August 10, 2019	5	5:00	Montevideo, Uruguay	For the UFC Women's Flyweight Championship.
Win	13–6	Lucie Pudilová	Decision (unanimous)	UFC Fight Night: Błachowicz vs. Santos	February 23, 2019	3	5:00	Prague, Czech Republic	
Win	12–6	Jennifer Maia	Decision (unanimous)	UFC Fight Night: dos Santos vs. Ivanov	July 14, 2018	3	5:00	Boise, Idaho, United States	
Loss	11–6	Alexis Davis	Decision (split)	UFC Fight Night: Swanson vs. Ortega	December 9, 2017	3	5:00	Fresno, California, United States	Flyweight debut.
Win	11–5	Katlyn Chookagian	Decision (split)	UFC 205	November 12, 2016	3	5:00	New York City, New York, United States	
Win	10–5	Lauren Murphy	Decision (unanimous)	UFC Fight Night: Mendes vs. Lamas	April 4, 2015	3	5:00	Fairfax, Virginia, United States	
Loss	9–5	Miesha Tate	Decision (unanimous)	UFC on Fox: Werdum vs. Browne	April 19, 2014	3	5:00	Orlando, Florida, United States	
Loss	9–4	Alexis Davis	Decision (unanimous)	UFC: Fight for the Troops 3	November 6, 2013	3	5:00	Fort Campbell, Kentucky, United States	
Win	9–3	Jéssica Andrade	TKO (punches and elbows)	UFC on Fox: Johnson vs. Moraga	July 27, 2013	2	3:57	Seattle, Washington, United States	
Loss	8–3	Ronda Rousey	Submission (armbar)	UFC 157	February 23, 2013	1	4:49	Anaheim, California, United States	For the UFC Women's Bantamweight Championship.
Win	8–2	Kaitlin Young	Submission (rear-naked choke)	Invicta FC 2	July 28, 2012	2	3:34	Kansas City, Kansas, United States	
Win	7–2	Ashleigh Curry	TKO (punches)	Invicta FC 1	April 28, 2012	1	1:58	Kansas City, Kansas, United States	
Loss	6–2	Sarah Kaufman	Decision (unanimous)	Strikeforce Challengers: Voelker vs. Bowling 3	July 22, 2011	3	5:00	Las Vegas, Nevada, United States	
Loss	6–1	Marloes Coenen	Submission (triangle choke)	Strikeforce: Feijao vs. Henderson	March 5, 2011	4	1:29	Columbus, Ohio, United States	For the Strikeforce Women's Bantamweight Championship.
Win	6–0	Jan Finney	TKO (punches)	Strikeforce Challengers: Wilcox vs. Ribeiro	November 19, 2010	3	1:30	Jackson, Mississippi, United States	
Win	5–0	Valentina Shevchenko	TKO (doctor stoppage)	C3 Fights: Red River Rivalry	September 30, 2010	2	3:00	Concho, Oklahoma, United States	
Win	4–0	Colleen Schneider	Decision (unanimous)	Strikeforce Challengers: Riggs vs. Taylor	August 13, 2010	2	3:00	Phoenix, Arizona, United States	Strikeforce Women's Bantamweight Tournament Reserve bout.
Win	3–0	Margarita de la Cruz Ramirez	TKO (doctor stoppage)	UWC Mexico 7	June 26, 2010	2	5:00	Tijuana, Mexico	
Win	2–0	Aleena Albertson	Submission (armbar)	Native FC 5	May 29, 2010	2	0:48	Campo, California, United States	
Win	1–0	Trudie Ginn	TKO (body kick)	Independent Event	March 13, 2010	1	2:59	Tijuana, Mexico	Bantamweight debut.

== Pay-per-view bouts ==
No	Event	Fight	Date	Venue	City	PPV buys
1.	UFC 157	Rousey vs. Carmouche	February 23, 2013	Honda Center	Anaheim, California, United States	450,000
2.	Bellator 278	Velasquez vs. Carmouche	April 22, 2022	Neal S. Blaisdell Center	Honolulu, Hawaii, United States	Not Disclosed
3.	Bellator 294	Carmouche vs. Bennett 2	April 21, 2023	Neal S. Blaisdell Center	Honolulu, Hawaii, United States	Not Disclosed

== See also ==
- List of current Bellator fighters
- List of female mixed martial artists
