= Ilima-Lei Macfarlane =

American mixed martial artist

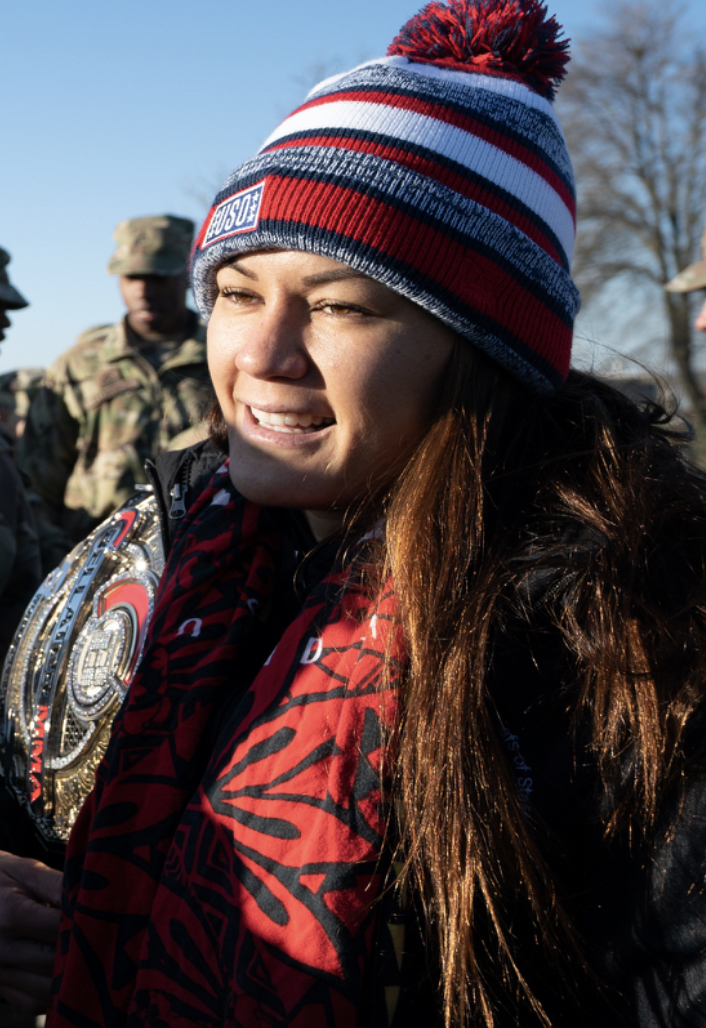
- Macfarlane in 2020.
- Born: April 2, 1990 (age 36); Honolulu, Hawaii, U.S.
- Other names: The Ilimanator
- Height: 5 ft 4 in (1.63 m)
- Weight: 125 lb (57 kg; 8.9 st)
- Division: Flyweight
- Reach: 66 1/2 in (169 cm)
- Fighting out of: San Diego, California, U.S.
- Team: San Diego Combat Academy
- Rank: Black belt in 10th Planet Jiu-Jitsu
- Years active: 2014–present

Mixed martial arts record
- Total: 16
- Wins: 13
- By knockout: 2
- By submission: 6
- By decision: 5
- Losses: 3
- By knockout: 1
- By decision: 2

Other information
- University: San Diego State University
- Mixed martial arts record from Sherdog

Ilima-Lei Macfarlane (born April 2, 1990) is an American professional mixed martial artist and 10th Planet Jiu-Jitsu practitioner. She is most known for her tenure with Bellator MMA, where she was the inaugural Bellator Women's Flyweight World Champion.

== Background ==
In her youth, Macfarlane played basketball, but her aspirations in the sport came to a stop due to series of knee injuries. Macfarlane graduated from Punahou School in 2009 in Honolulu, Hawaii. Although she got a scholarship for wrestling to Menlo College, she decided to study Anthropology at San Diego State University from where she earned a Bachelor's Degree in 2013. Afterwards, she continued her education at SDSU to study Master of Arts in Liberal Studies.

During the summer before grad program, she decided to lose some weight she gained in the college and joined a CrossFit gym and Liz Carmouche's MMA gym. She grew affinity for mixed martial arts and continued training at the San Diego Combat Academy.

== Mixed martial arts career ==
=== Xplode Fight Series ===
Macfarlane began her amateur MMA career in 2014. She fought five times during that year, mainly with Xplode Fight Series, and went undefeated as an amateur.

Macfarlane's first professional fight was an unsanctioned match against Katie Castro for Xplode Fight Series in 2015. Macfarlane won via technical knockout ten seconds into the bout. In the aftermath of the lopsided affair, the California State Athletic Commission (CSAC) launched an investigation into the organization's unsanctioned MMA events. Castro had a 0–2 record before fighting Macfarlane and footage of the match was posted on the internet and labeled "Soccer mom loses to MMA fighter". The video went viral, garnering over a million views on YouTube and was discussed on a few television news networks.

=== Bellator MMA ===
Following the bout with Castro, Macfarlane signed a three-fight contract with Bellator MMA. She made her debut in August 2015 at Bellator 141 where she defeated Maria Rios by split decision.

Macfarlane fought Amber Tackett at Bellator 148 where Macfarlane won by armbar submission in the first round.

Macfarlane's next bout was against Rebecca Ruth at Bellator 157 where she won by standing rear-naked choke in the second round.

Macfarlane would then fight Emily Ducote at Bellator 167 where she was victorious via unanimous decision.

Macfarlane faced Jessica Middleton at Bellator 178 and won by armbar submission in the first round.

==== Bellator Women's Flyweight World Champion ====
Macfarlane and Emily Ducote had a rematch at Bellator 186 for the inaugural Bellator Women's Flyweight World Championship. Macfarlane won the bout with an armbar variation in the fifth round to win her first MMA championship.

Macfarlane faced Alejandra Lara at Bellator 201 for the first defense of her flyweight title. Macfarlane won the fight in the third round via armbar.

Macfarlane faced Valérie Létourneau at Bellator 213 in Macfarlane's hometown of Honolulu, Hawaii. Macfarlane successfully defended her title for a second time, defeating Létourneau by third round submission.

In her third title defense, Macfarlane faced Veta Arteaga at Bellator 220 on April 27, 2019. She won the fight via TKO due to a doctor's stoppage in the third round.

Macfarlane made her fourth title defense against Kate Jackson at Bellator 236 on December 21, 2019. Macfarlane was victorious via unanimous decision.

On February 10, 2020, it was announced that Macfarlane had signed a ten-fight, five-year extension contract with Bellator.

Macfarlane attempted her next defense against undefeated challenger Juliana Velasquez on December 10, 2020, at Bellator 254. She lost the fight and her title via unanimous decision.

==== Post Title Reign ====
After more than a year off due to knee surgery and rehab, Macfarlane made her return against Justine Kish on April 23, 2022, at Bellator 279. In an upset, she lost the bout via unanimous decision.

Macfarlane faced Bruna Ellen at Bellator 284 on August 12, 2022. At weigh ins, Macfarlane was three pounds over the division non-title fight limit at 129 lbs, resulting in her being a fined a percentage of her purse which went to Ellen and the bout proceeded at catchweight. She won the bout via unanimous decision.

Macfarlane faced Kana Watanabe on April 22, 2023, at Bellator 295. She won the close bout via split decision.

MacFarlane was scheduled to face reigning champion Liz Carmouche for the Bellator Women's Flyweight Championship on October 7, 2023, at Bellator 300. However at the weigh-ins, Macfarlane came in at 126.6 lb (after coming in at 127.4 lb in her first attempt), 1.6 pounds over the women's flyweight limit for a title fight. The commission gave her an additional hour to cut weight, but Macfarlane came in at 128.2 lb. As a result, the bout proceeded as a one way title bout, where in the event that Macfarlane won the fight, she would be ineligible for the championship and the title would be left vacant, while if Carmouche won it would still count as a title defense. MacFarlane lost the fight via leg kick TKO in the fifth round.

=== Global Fight League ===
MacFarlane was scheduled to face Viviane Pereira on May 25, 2025 at GFL 2. However, the first two GFL events were postponed indefinitely.

== Professional grappling career ==
Macfarlane competed in a four-woman Combat Jiu-Jitsu tournament at EBI 12 on July 29, 2017 where she won both matches and the title.

Macfarlane returned to grappling at Submission Underground 21 on March 28, 2021 where she faced Jessica Eye. She won the match by submission in EBI overtime.

Macfarlane was promoted to black belt by Richie Martinez at 10th Planet Jiu Jitsu San Diego on August 13, 2023.

== Personal life ==
In April 2020, Ilima-Lei, her sister Mahina, and one other anonymous woman filed a lawsuit against Punahou School, claiming that the school failed to take action after years of alleged sexual abuse by the school's assistant basketball coach, Dwayne Yuen. In the lawsuit, all three accuse Yuen of repeated sexual abuse, harassment, lewd gestures, and showing young girls pornographic photos. In December 2024, Yuen pleaded guilty to three counts of possessing child pornography.

== Championships and accomplishments ==
=== Combat jiu-jitsu ===
- Eddie Bravo Invitational
  - Combat Jiu-Jitsu Women's Flyweight Championship (One time, inaugural)

=== Mixed martial arts ===
- Bellator MMA
  - Bellator Women's Flyweight World Championship (One time, inaugural)
    - Four successful title defenses
  - Second most submission wins in Bellator history (six) - tied with Michael Chandler and Neiman Gracie
  - Most submission wins in Bellator Flyweight division history (six)
  - Most wins in Bellator amongst women (12)
  - Most stoppage wins in Bellator amongst women (seven)
  - Most stoppage wins in Bellator Flyweight division history (seven)
  - Most wins in Bellator Flyweight division history (11)
  - Most fights in Bellator Flyweight division history (14)
- MMAjunkie.com
  - 2018 Breakthrough Fighter of the Year

== Mixed martial arts record ==
Professional record breakdown
16 matches	13 wins	3 losses
By knockout	2	1
By submission	6	0
By decision	5	2

Res.	Record	Opponent	Method	Event	Date	Round	Time	Location	Notes
Loss	13–3	Liz Carmouche	TKO (leg kick)	Bellator 300	October 7, 2023	5	0:17	San Diego, California, United States	For the Bellator Women's Flyweight World Championship. Macfarlane missed weight (126.6 lbs) and was ineligible for the title.
Win	13–2	Kana Watanabe	Decision (split)	Bellator 295	April 22, 2023	3	5:00	Honolulu, Hawaii, United States	
Win	12–2	Bruna Ellen	Decision (unanimous)	Bellator 284	August 12, 2022	3	5:00	Sioux Falls, South Dakota, United States	Catchweight (129 lb) bout; Macfarlane missed weight.
Loss	11–2	Justine Kish	Decision (unanimous)	Bellator 279	April 23, 2022	3	5:00	Honolulu, Hawaii, United States	
Loss	11–1	Juliana Velasquez	Decision (unanimous)	Bellator 254	December 10, 2020	5	5:00	Uncasville, Connecticut, United States	Lost the Bellator Women's Flyweight World Championship.
Win	11–0	Kate Jackson	Decision (unanimous)	Bellator 236	December 21, 2019	5	5:00	Honolulu, Hawaii, United States	Defended the Bellator Women's Flyweight World Championship.
Win	10–0	Veta Arteaga	TKO (doctor stoppage)	Bellator 220	April 27, 2019	3	1:50	San Jose, California, United States	Defended the Bellator Women's Flyweight World Championship.
Win	9–0	Valérie Létourneau	Submission (triangle choke)	Bellator 213	December 15, 2018	3	3:19	Honolulu, Hawaii, United States	Defended the Bellator Women's Flyweight World Championship.
Win	8–0	Alejandra Lara	Submission (armbar)	Bellator 201	June 29, 2018	3	3:55	Temecula, California, United States	Defended the Bellator Women's Flyweight World Championship.
Win	7–0	Emily Ducote	Submission (triangle armbar)	Bellator 186	November 3, 2017	5	3:42	University Park, Pennsylvania, United States	Won the inaugural Bellator Women's Flyweight World Championship.
Win	6–0	Jessica Middleton	Submission (armbar)	Bellator 178	April 21, 2017	1	2:15	Uncasville, Connecticut, United States	
Win	5–0	Emily Ducote	Decision (unanimous)	Bellator 167	December 3, 2016	3	5:00	Thackerville, Oklahoma, United States	
Win	4–0	Rebecca Ruth	Submission (standing rear-naked choke)	Bellator 157	June 24, 2016	2	3:00	St.Louis, Missouri, United States	
Win	3–0	Amber Tackett	Submission (armbar)	Bellator 148	January 29, 2016	1	2:09	Fresno, California, United States	
Win	2–0	Maria Rios	Decision (split)	Bellator 141	August 28, 2015	3	5:00	Temecula, California, United States	
Win	1–0	Katie Castro	KO (punches)	Xplode Fight Series – Hurricane	January 17, 2015	1	0:10	Valley Center, California, United States	

Amateur record breakdown		
5 matches	5 wins	0 losses
By knockout	1	0
By submission	3	0
By decision	1	0

Res.	Record	Opponent	Method	Event	Date	Round	Time	Location	Notes
Win	5–0	Angela Hancock	Submission (armbar)	Xplode Fight Series - Wasteland	November 8, 2014	3	1:32	Valley Center, California, United States	
Win	4–0	LaToya Darby	TKO (punches)	Xplode Fight Series - Tornado	September 20, 2014	1	0:50	Valley Center, California, United States	
Win	3–0	Breanna Bland	Submission (kimura)	Xplode Fight Series - Tidal Wave	August 23, 2014	1	1:47	Valley Center, California, United States	
Win	2–0	Monique Martinez	Decision (split)	Archangel Worldwide MMA – Tournament of Truth 2	May 2, 2014	3	2:00	Riverside, California, United States	
Win	1–0	Stephanie Houser	Submission (rear-naked choke)	Xplode Fight Series - Fire	March 22, 2014	1	0:46	Valley Center, California, United States	

== Combat jiu-jitsu record ==
Res.	Record	Opponent	Method	Event	Division	Date	Notes
Win	2–0	(Norway) Celine Haga	Submission (kimura)	EBI 12	Flyweight	July 29, 2017	Won the inaugural EBI Women's Flyweight Championship.
Win	1–0	(United States) Brooke Mayo	Submission (triangle choke)	EBI 12	Flyweight	July 29, 2017	

== See also ==
- List of current Bellator fighters
- List of current mixed martial arts champions
- List of female mixed martial artists
- List of Bellator MMA champions
