= Sahil, Azerbaijan =

Sahil
- Town
- Location within Azerbaijan
- Coordinates: 40.22°N 49.5714°E
- Country: Azerbaijan
- City: Baku
- Raion: Garadagh

Population
  - Total: 22,116
- Time zone: UTC+4 (AZT)
  - Summer (DST): UTC+4 (AZT)

Sahil is a village and municipality in the Garadagh raion of Baku, Azerbaijan. It had a population of 8,100 in 1974 and currently has a population of 23,900.

== Notable natives ==
- Emin Guliyev – National Hero of Azerbaijan
- Rovshan Rzayev – National Hero of Azerbaijan
- Tofiq Musayev – mixed martial artist
