= Bellator 271 =

Bellator mixed martial arts event in 2021

Bellator 271: Cyborg vs. Kavanagh
- The poster for Bellator 271: Cyborg vs. Kavanagh
- Promotion: Bellator MMA
- Date: November 12, 2021
- Venue: Seminole Hard Rock Hotel & Casino Hollywood
- City: Hollywood, Florida, United States

Event chronology
Bellator 270: Queally vs. Pitbull 2	Bellator 271: Cyborg vs. Kavanagh	Bellator 272: Pettis vs. Horiguchi

Bellator 271: Cyborg vs. Kavanagh was a mixed martial arts event produced by Bellator MMA that took place on November 12, 2021, at the Seminole Hard Rock Hotel & Casino Hollywood in Hollywood, Florida, United States.

== Background ==
The event was headlined by Cris Cyborg who faced off against Sinead Kavanagh for the Bellator Women's Featherweight World Championship. Cyborg completed her third successful title defense since coming over from the UFC in 2019. The 36-year-old captured the championship in her first promotional appearance when she stopped Julia Budd in the fourth round at Bellator 238 in January 2020. Since then, Cyborg has gone on to earn stoppage wins over Arlene Biencowe and Leslie Smith. Kavanagh got her first shot at Bellator gold in her ninth promotional appearance. The SBG Ireland featherweight entered the bout on back-to-back victories — a unanimous decision win over Katharina Lehner at Bellator Euro Series 9 in October, and a second-round TKO of Olga Rubin at Bellator 234.

A heavyweight bout between #6 ranked Steve Mowry and promotional newcomer Rakim Cleveland was also scheduled for this event.

A middleweight bout between Jordan Newman and Shane O'Shea was scheduled for the event, however O'Shea won't weigh-in due to undisclosed reasons and the bout was scrapped.

== Results ==
Main Card (Showtime)
Weight class				Method	Round	Time	Notes
Women's Featherweight	Cris Cyborg (c)	def.	Sinead Kavanagh	KO (punches)	1	1:32	(Note: For the Bellator Women's Featherweight World Championship.)
Heavyweight	Linton Vassell	def.	Tyrell Fortune	Decision (split) (29–28, 28–29, 29–28)	3	5:00
Featherweight	Aaron Pico	def.	Justin Gonzales	Decision (unanimous) (30–27, 30–27, 30–26)	3	5:00
Women's Featherweight	Arlene Blencowe	def.	Pam Sorenson	Decision (unanimous) (29–28, 30–27, 30–27)	3	5:00
Preliminary card (Youtube/Pluto TV)
Heavyweight	Steve Mowry	def.	Rakim Cleveland	Submission (kimura)	1	3:28
Women's Flyweight	Bruna Ellen	def.	Desiree Yanez	Decision (split) (29–28, 28–29, 29–28)	3	5:00
Welterweight	Roman Faraldo	def.	Robert Turnquest	KO (flying knee)	1	1:17
Featherweight	Cody Law	def.	Colton Hamm	KO (elbows)	1	4:21
Catchweight (128 lb)	Valerie Loureda	def.	Taylor Turner	Decision (split) (29–28, 28–29, 30–27)	3	5:00
Heavyweight	Waldo Cortes-Acosta	def.	Mo DeReese	Decision (unanimous) (30–27, 30–27, 30–27)	3	5:00
Welterweight	Ethan Hughes	def.	Mahmoud Fawzy	TKO (punches)	3	4:05

== See also ==
- 2021 in Bellator MMA
- List of Bellator MMA events
- List of current Bellator fighters
