= Faith Van Duin =

New Zealander mixed martial arts fighter

- Born: 26 June 1986 (age 40); Rotorua, New Zealand
- Other names: The Immortal
- Height: 5 ft 10 in (1.78 m)
- Weight: 145 lb (66 kg; 10.4 st)
- Division: Featherweight
- Reach: 70.0 in (178 cm)
- Fighting out of: Papamoa, New Zealand
- Team: Gym 101
- Years active: 2013 – present

Mixed martial arts record
- Total: 9
- Wins: 5
- By knockout: 1
- By submission: 3
- By decision: 1
- Losses: 4
- By knockout: 4

Other information
- Mixed martial arts record from Sherdog

Faith Van Duin (born 6 June 1986) is a New Zealand mixed martial artist currently competing in the Featherweight division. She most notably fought in Invicta Fighting Championships.

== Mixed martial arts career ==
=== Early career ===
Van Duin made her professional mixed martial arts debut in April 2013. She fought primarily in her native New Zealand and Australia, amassing a record of 4–1 before joining Invicta Fighting Championships.

=== Invicta Fighting Championships ===
Van Duin was expected to make her promotional debut on 5 December 2014 at Invicta FC 10: Waterson vs. Tiburcio against Charmaine Tweet. However, the bout was scrapped on 3 December after Tweet was medically disqualified from competing on the card.

Van Duin eventually made her debut for the promotion on 24 April 2015 at Invicta FC 12: Kankaanpää vs. Souza when she faced Amanda Bell. Van Duin won the fight via submission due to a rear-naked choke in the second round. The win also earned Van Duin her first Performance of the Night bonus award.

Van Duin faced Cris Cyborg for the Invicta FC Featherweight Championship on 9 July 2015 at Invicta FC 13: Cyborg vs. Van Duin.

== Kickboxing and Muay Thai Career ==
On the 5th of November, Van Duin fought former World Boxing Champion Geovana Peres for the WMC New Zealand Heavyweight title. Van Duin lost by Split Decision.

== Mixed martial arts record ==
Professional record breakdown
| 10 matches | 6 wins | 4 losses |
| By knockout | 1 | 4 |
| By submission | 3 | 0 |
| By decision | 2 | 0 |

| Res. | Record | Opponent | Method | Event | Date | Round | Time | Location | Notes |
|---|---|---|---|---|---|---|---|---|---|
| Loss | 6–4 | Kaitlin Young | TKO (punches) | Invicta FC 35: Bennett vs. Rodriguez II | 7 June 2019 | 3 | 3:52 | Kansas City, Kansas, United States | |
| Loss | 6–3 | Irene Aldana | TKO (punches) | Invicta FC 19: Maia vs. Modafferi | 23 September 2016 | 1 | 4:57 | Kansas City, Missouri, United States | |
| Win | 6–2 | Charlene Watt | Decision (unanimous) | Brace 41 | 17 June 2016 | 3 | N/A | Christchurch, New Zealand | Bantamweight debut. |
| Loss | 5–2 | Cris Cyborg | TKO (knee to the body and punches) | Invicta FC 13: Cyborg vs. Van Duin | 9 July 2015 | 1 | 0:45 | Las Vegas, Nevada, United States | For the Invicta FC Featherweight Championship. |
| Win | 5–1 | Amanda Bell | Submission (rear-naked choke) | Invicta FC 12: Kankaanpää vs. Souza | 24 April 2015 | 2 | 0:38 | Kansas City, Missouri, United States | Performance of the Night. |
| Loss | 4–1 | Arlene Blencowe | TKO (knee to the body) | Storm MMA - Storm Damage 5 | 30 August 2014 | 3 | 3:00 | Canberra, Australia | Catchweight fight. Blencowe did not make weight. |
| Win | 4–0 | Kate Da Silva | Submission (triangle choke) | Storm MMA - Storm Damage 3 | 31 August 2013 | 4 | 1:36 | Canberra, Australia | Storm MMA Finals. Won Storm MMA Woman's Featherweight Championship. |
| Win | 3–0 | Arlene Blencowe | Decision (split) | Storm MMA - Storm Damage 3 | 31 August 2013 | 2 | 3:00 | Canberra, Australia | Storm MMA Semi-Finals |
| Win | 2–0 | Michelle Peruzzi | TKO (punches) | Storm MMA - Storm Damage 3 | 31 August 2013 | 1 | 2:01 | Canberra, Australia | Storm MMA Quarter-Finals |
| Win | 1–0 | Kelly Kinita | Submission (rear-naked choke) | ETK - Sunday Session 18 | 28 April 2013 | 4 | N/A | Auckland, New Zealand | |

== See also ==
- List of female mixed martial artists
