= Cody Law =

American collegiate wrestler and MMA fighter

- Born: March 24, 1995 (age 31); Windber, Pennsylvania, U.S.
- Height: 5 ft 8 in (1.73 m)
- Weight: 145 lb (66 kg; 10.4 st)
- Division: Featherweight (2020–present)
- Reach: 68.5 in (174 cm)
- Fighting out of: Coconut Creek, Florida, U.S.
- Team: The Mat Factory; American Top Team (2020–present)
- Rank: Blue belt in Brazilian Jiu-Jitsu
- Wrestling: NCAA Division I Wrestling
- Years active: 2020–present

Mixed martial arts record
- Total: 11
- Wins: 9
- By knockout: 4
- By submission: 2
- By decision: 3
- Losses: 2
- By decision: 2

Amateur record
- Total: 5
- Wins: 5
- By knockout: 1
- By submission: 2
- By decision: 2

Other information
- University: University of Pittsburgh at Johnstown; Pennsylvania State University
- Notable school: Forest Hills High School
- Website: https://www.codylawmma.com
- Mixed martial arts record from Sherdog

Cody Law (born March 24, 1995) is an American professional mixed martial artist and graduated collegiate wrestler currently competing in the featherweight division. He has previously spent most of his career in Bellator MMA. As a folkstyle wrestler, he was an NCAA Division II champion and two-time DII All-American out of University of Pittsburgh-Johnstown and a PIAA champion as a high schooler.

== Background ==
Cody is the son of Crystal Law and has three siblings, one of them is his younger brother named Triston, whom he was teammates with at PSU.

== Wrestling career ==
=== High school ===
Law was born in Windber, Pennsylvania, and attended Forest Hills High School. He didn't have particular success as a freshman, posting a losing record (16 wins, 17 losses) and placing sixth at districts (not high enough for regionals). He improved his resume as a sophomore, posting a record of 26 wins and 7 losses and placing third at districts and sixth at regionals, but still not qualifying for state. He kept improving as a junior and posted a record of 36 wins and just 2 losses, the first one on the districts finals (finishing as the runner-up) and the second one came after winning the regionals and reaching the PIAA state finals, where he lost by only one point (2-3). As a senior, he had his most successful season, posting an unbeaten record of 34 victories and no defeats, placing first at districts, regionals and the state championships. Overall, Law posted 112 wins and 26 losses during his career and was in the top 15 of the national high school rankings at 160 pounds.

=== University ===
After finishing his high school education, Law attended Pennsylvania State University, that is known for having one of the most successful wrestling teams at the time (still has), having won the NCAA Division I's team titles in the last three seasons at that time. As a redshirt athlete (13'-14'), he compiled a record of 14 victories and 4 defeats in Open tournaments. He then competed as a freshman at 157 pounds, compiling a record of 13 wins and 6 losses during regular season and not competing at that year's NCAA DI championships. After wrestling season, he competed at the 15' Junior Nationals, where he placed third.

After that season, he chose to transfer to the University of Pittsburgh-Johnstown, that had an NCAA Division II wrestling program. He explained:

"It is a combination of things... My goal is to be a national champion. I wasn't getting the job done there... They're going to win (the team title). I really believe they will, but at the end of the day, my goal is to be an individual champ, too.".

However, this led him unable to compete as a sophomore.

As a junior, he became the top-ranked wrestler in the country and posted a record of 17-1 during regular season. During post-season, he won a PSAC conference title and became an All-American with a fourth-place finish at the NCAA DII championships. As a senior, he had his most successful season, compiling a record of 25 wins and 2 losses (both of those losses to Division I athletes), winning the National Championship and becoming a two-time All-American.

== Mixed martial arts career ==
=== Early career ===
Law began his amateur MMA career a couple of months after he graduated from UPJ and amassed a 5–0 record with three stoppage wins (two submissions, one knockout) and two decisions.

=== Bellator MMA ===
On September 1, 2020, Law announced that he had signed a contract with Bellator MMA. He made his professional debut against Orlando Ortega on October 29, 2020, at Bellator 250, winning the bout via submission in the first round.

In the sophomore bout of his professional career, Law faced Kenny Champion at Bellator 254 on December 10, 2020. After dominating the contest, he eventually won the fight via technical knockout at the last minute of the third round.

Law faced Nathan Ghareeb on April 9, 2021, at Bellator 256. He won the bout via unanimous decision.

Law faced Theodore Macuka on July 16, 2021, at Bellator 262. He won the bout via TKO in the first round.

Law faced Colton Hamm on November 12, 2021, at Bellator 271. He won the bout after knocking Hamm out via ground and pound in the first round.

Law was scheduled to face Johnny Soto on March 12, 2022, at Bellator 276. However, Soto was forced to pull out of the bout and was replaced by James Adcock. He won the bout after knocking Adcock out in the first round.

Law faced James Gonzalez at Bellator 282 on June 24, 2022. In an upset, he lost the bout via unanimous decision.

Law faced Cris Lencioni on December 9, 2022, at Bellator 289. He lost the fight via split decision.

Law faced Edwin Chavez on June 16, 2023 at Bellator 297. He won the bout via unanimous decision.

Law faced Jefferson Pontes on November 17, 2023, at Bellator 301. In dominant fashion, Law won the bout via unanimous decision.

=== PFL ===
Following Bellator's acquisition by the Professional Fighters League, Law made his debut for PFL at PFL 7 (2024) on August 2, 2024 against Zachary Hicks. He won the fight via a rear-naked choke submission in the first round.

== Championships and accomplishments ==
=== Folkstyle wrestling ===
- National Collegiate Athletic Association
  - NCAA Division II 157 lb National Champion out of University of Pittsburgh-Johnstown (2018)
  - NCAA Division II All-American out of the University of Pittsburgh-Johnstown (2017, 2018)
- Pennsylvania Interscholastic Athletic Association
  - PIAA AA 160 lb State Runner-up out of Forest Hills High School (2012)
  - PIAA AA 160 lb State Champion out of Forest Hills High School (2013)

== Mixed martial arts record ==
Professional record breakdown
11 matches	9 wins	2 losses
By knockout	4	0
By submission	2	0
By decision	3	2

Res.	Record	Opponent	Method	Event	Date	Round	Time	Location	Notes
Win	9–2	Zachary Hicks	Submission (rear-naked choke)	PFL 7 (2024)	August 2, 2024	1	3:15	Nashville, Tennessee, United States	
Win	8–2	Jefferson Pontes	Decision (unanimous)	Bellator 301	November 17, 2023	3	5:00	Chicago, Illinois, United States	
Win	7–2	Edwin Chavez	Decision (unanimous)	Bellator 297	June 16, 2023	3	5:00	Chicago, Illinois, United States	
Loss	6–2	Cris Lencioni	Decision (split)	Bellator 289	December 9, 2022	3	5:00	Uncasville, Connecticut, United States	
Loss	6–1	James Gonzalez	Decision (unanimous)	Bellator 282	June 24, 2022	3	5:00	Uncasville, Connecticut, United States	
Win	6–0	James Adcock	KO (punches)	Bellator 276	March 12, 2022	1	1:17	St. Louis, Missouri, United States	
Win	5–0	Colton Hamm	KO (elbows)	Bellator 271	November 12, 2021	1	4:21	Hollywood, Florida, United States	
Win	4–0	Theodore Macuka	TKO (punches)	Bellator 262	July 16, 2021	1	1:54	Uncasville, Connecticut, United States	
Win	3–0	Nathan Ghareeb	Decision (unanimous)	Bellator 256	April 9, 2021	3	5:00	Uncasville, Connecticut, United States	
Win	2–0	Kenny Champion	TKO (punches)	Bellator 254	December 10, 2020	3	4:44	Uncasville, Connecticut, United States	
Win	1–0	Orlando Ortega	Submission (brabo choke)	Bellator 250	October 28, 2020	1	2:41	Uncasville, Connecticut, United States	Featherweight debut.

== NCAA record ==
NCAA Division II Championships Matches
Res.	Record	Opponent	Score	Date	Event
2018 NCAA (DII) Championships (gold) at 157 lbs
Win	8-1	Larry Bomstad	6-3	March 10, 2018	2018 NCAA Division II Wrestling Championships
Win	7-1	Jared Reis	7-4	March 10, 2018	2018 NCAA Division II Wrestling Championships
Win	6-1	Cortez Arredondo	7-1	March 10, 2018	2018 NCAA Division II Wrestling Championships
Win	5-1	Heath Lange	TF 18-1	March 10, 2018	2018 NCAA Division II Wrestling Championships
2017 NCAA (DII) Championships 4th at 157 lbs
Win	4-1	Joey White	4-3	March 11, 2017	2017 NCAA Division II Wrestling Championships
Win	3-1	Heath Lange	Fall	March 11, 2017	2017 NCAA Division II Wrestling Championships
Win	2-1	Kyle Fantin	DQ	March 11, 2017	2017 NCAA Division II Wrestling Championships
Loss	1-1	DeAndre` Johnson	SV-1 10-12	March 11, 2017	2017 NCAA Division II Wrestling Championships
Win	1-0	Dylan Herman	MD 17-4	March 11, 2017	2017 NCAA Division II Wrestling Championships

== See also ==
- List of current Bellator fighters
- List of male mixed martial artists
