= Bellator 262 =

Bellator mixed martial arts event in 2021

Bellator 262: Velasquez vs. Kielholtz
- The poster for Bellator 262: Velasquez vs. Kielholtz
- Promotion: Bellator MMA
- Date: July 16, 2021
- Venue: Mohegan Sun Arena
- City: Uncasville, Connecticut, United States

Event chronology
| Bellator 261: Johnson vs. Moldavsky | Bellator 262: Velasquez vs. Kielholtz | Bellator 263: Pitbull vs. McKee |

Bellator 262: Velasquez vs. Kielholtz was a mixed martial arts event produced by Bellator MMA that took place on July 16, 2021, at Mohegan Sun Arena in Uncasville, Connecticut.

== Background ==
Undefeated Juliana Velasquez made her first title defense of the Bellator MMA Women's Flyweight World Championship against top-tier kickboxer Denise Kielholtz. The Brazil native has won all six of her fights in Bellator, including three by finish. Velasquez, 34, has a background in judo. Ranked #4 Kielholtz (6–2) is the Bellator Kickboxing Women's Flyweight Championship and has won four straight in MMA. She is 6-1 under the Bellator MMA banner.

Two heavyweight bouts were announced for the main card: the #5 ranked Tyrell Fortune faced the #7 ranked Matt Mitrione, while the #4 ranked Linton Vassell was expected to meet the promotional newcomer Marcelo Golm. On July 12, the bout between Vassell and Golm was scratched after Vassell suffered an injury.

Former Bellator Women's Featherweight title challenger Arlene Blencowe fought Dayana Silva on the main card.

Travis Davis faced the undefeated Johnny Eblen in a middleweight bout, which served as the main card opener.

A heavyweight bout between Ronny Markes and Said Sowma took place on the preliminary portion of the event.

A welterweight bout between the undefeated Roman Faraldo and promotional newcomer John Ramirez was announced for the event prelims. However, Faraldo had to pull out off the bout after his wife went into labor.

== Results ==
Main Card (Showtime)
| Weight class | | | | Method | Round | Time | Notes |
|---|---|---|---|---|---|---|---|
| Women's Flyweight | Juliana Velasquez (c) | def. | Denise Kielholtz | Decision (split) (48–47, 47–48, 48–47) | 5 | 5:00 | (Note: For the Bellator MMA Women's Flyweight World Championship.) |
| Heavyweight | Tyrell Fortune | def. | Matt Mitrione | TKO (submission to punches) | 1 | 1:45 |
| Bantamweight | Matheus Mattos | def. | Cee Jay Hamilton | TKO (punches) | 2 | 1:33 |
| Women's Featherweight | Arlene Blencowe | def. | Dayana Silva | TKO (punches) | 3 | 1:00 |
| Middleweight | Johnny Eblen | def. | Travis Davis | Decision (unanimous) (30–27, 30–26, 30–26) | 3 | 5:00 |
Preliminary card (Youtube/Pluto TV)
| Heavyweight | Said Sowma | def. | Ronny Markes | KO (punches) | 1 | 1:09 |
| Featherweight | Cody Law | def. | Theodore Macuka | TKO (punches) | 1 | 1:54 |
| Women's Flyweight | Diana Avsaragova | def. | Gabriella Gulfin | Decision (split) (29–28, 28–29, 29–28) | 3 | 5:00 |
| Featherweight | Adil Benjilany | def. | Johnny Soto | Decision (unanimous) (29–28, 29–28, 29–28) | 3 | 5:00 |
| Lightweight | Charlie Campbell | def. | Nicolas Giulietti | TKO (leg kicks and punches) | 2 | 1:30 |

== See also ==
- 2021 in Bellator MMA
- List of Bellator MMA events
- List of current Bellator fighters
