= Bellator 291 =

MMA event

Bellator 291: Amosov vs. Storley 2
- The poster for Bellator 291: Amosov vs. Storley 2
- Promotion: Bellator MMA
- Date: February 25, 2023
- Venue: 3Arena
- City: Dublin, Ireland

Event chronology
Bellator 290: Bader vs. Fedor 2	Bellator 291: Amosov vs. Storley 2	Bellator 292: Nurmagomedov vs. Henderson

Bellator 291: Amosov vs. Storley 2 (also known as Bellator Dublin) was a mixed martial arts event produced by Bellator MMA, that took place on February 25, 2023, at the 3Arena in Dublin, Ireland.

== Background ==
On February 25, Bellator hosted an event in the 3Arena in Dublin, Ireland. The event, which was Bellator's tenth event in the nation, after first debuting there in 2016. The promotion stated that the most recent event broke the 3Arena's attendance record.

A Bellator Welterweight World Championship unification bout between current champion Yaroslav Amosov and interim champion Logan Storley headlined the event. The pair previously met at Bellator 252, where Amosov won via split decision.

A featherweight bout between Ciarán Clarke and Keir Harvie was scheduled for this event. However, Harvie pulled out of the bout due to injury two weeks before the event and was replaced by Leonardos Sinis at a catchweight of 147.5 pounds.

A welterweight bout between Oliver Enkamp and Luca Poclit was scheduled for this event. However, Enkamp had to pull out of the bout due to injury.

At the weigh-ins, Leonardos Sinis weighed in at 148.8 pounds, 1.3 pounds over the 147.5 pounds fight limit. The bout proceeded at catchweight with Sinis being fined 20% of his purse, which went to his opponent Ciarán Clarke.

== Results ==
Main Card (Showtime)
Weight class				Method	Round	Time	Notes
Welterweight	Yaroslav Amosov (c)	def.	Logan Storley (ic)	Decision (unanimous) (50–45, 50–45, 50–45)	5	5:00	(Note: For the Bellator Welterweight World Championship.)
Featherweight	Jeremy Kennedy	def.	Pedro Carvalho	Decision (unanimous) (30–27, 30–27, 30–27)	3	5:00
Lightweight	Bryce Logan	def.	Peter Queally	TKO (elbow and punches)	2	2:31
Women's Featherweight	Sinead Kavanagh	def.	Janay Harding	Decision (unanimous) (30–27, 29–28, 29–28)	3	5:00
Catchweight (148.8 lb)	Ciarán Clarke	def.	Leonardos Sinis	Decision (unanimous) (30–26, 30–26, 30–26)	3	5:00	(Note: Originally a 147.5 lb bout; Sinis missed weight (148.8 lb).)
Preliminary card (Youtube/Pluto TV)
Light Heavyweight	Karl Moore	def.	Maciej Różański	Decision (unanimous) (29–28, 29–28, 29–28)	3	5:00
Middleweight	Mike Shipman	def.	Charlie Ward	Decision (unanimous) (30–27, 30–27, 30–27)	3	5:00
Heavyweight	Oleg Popov	def.	Gökhan Saricam	Decision (unanimous) (29–28, 29–28, 29–28)	3	5:00
Middleweight	Norbert Növényi Jr.	def.	Andy Manzolo	TKO (punch)	1	3:12
Bantamweight	Brian Moore	def.	Luca Iovine	Decision (split) (29–28, 28–29, 29–28)	3	5:00
Featherweight	Richie Smullen	def.	Piotr Niedzielski	Decision (split) (29–28, 28–29, 29–28)	3	5:00
Featherweight	Darragh Kelly	def.	Dorval Jordan	TKO (punches)	3	1:58
Featherweight	Asaël Adjoudj	def.	Liam McCracken	Decision (unanimous) (29–28, 29–28, 29–28)	3	5:00
Featherweight	Khasan Magomedsharipov	def.	Rafael Hudson	TKO (punches)	1	4:40
Women's Flyweight	Jena Bishop	def.	Elina Kallionidou	Decision (unanimous) (30–27, 30–27, 30–27)	3	5:00
Featherweight	Kenny Mokhonoana	def.	Craig McIntosh	TKO (elbows and punches)	1	3:13
Catchweight (165 lb)	Dmytrii Hrytsenko	def.	Daniele Scatizzi	Decision (unanimous) (30–27, 29–28, 29–28)	3	5:00
Welterweight	Steven Hill	def.	Joël Kouadja	Submission (rear-naked choke)	2	2:03

== See also ==
- 2023 in Bellator MMA
- List of Bellator MMA events
- List of current Bellator fighters
