= Arlene Blencowe =

Australian mixed martial arts (MMA) fighter

- Born: 11 April 1983 (age 43); New South Wales, Australia
- Other names: Angerfist
- Nationality: Australian
- Height: 5 ft 6 in (1.68 m)
- Weight: 145 lb (66 kg; 10.4 st)
- Division: Featherweight
- Reach: 66 in (168 cm)
- Style: Boxing, Kickboxing
- Stance: Orthodox
- Team: Allegiance Combat, Fitness Centre & Sydney West Martial Arts
- Years active: 2013–present (MMA); 2012–present (boxing)

Professional boxing record
- Total: 8
- Wins: 4
- By knockout: 2
- Losses: 4

Mixed martial arts record
- Total: 26
- Wins: 16
- By knockout: 8
- By submission: 2
- By decision: 6
- Losses: 10
- By submission: 5
- By decision: 5

Other information
- Boxing record from BoxRec
- Mixed martial arts record from Sherdog

Arlene Blencowe (born 11 April 1983) is an Australian retired mixed martial artist and boxer who competed in the Women's Featherweight division. She most notably fought in Bellator MMA, where she was the first Australian female fighter in the promotion's history.

== Boxing career ==
Blencowe began her boxing career in 2012 in her native Australia. She has world championships in World Boxing Federation and Women's International Boxing Association. She has a current record of 4 wins and 4 losses.

== Mixed martial arts career ==
=== Early career ===
Blencowe began her professional MMA career a year after she began boxing in April 2013. Fighting exclusively in her native Australia, she amassed a record of 5 wins and 4 losses over the first year and a half of her career.

=== Bellator MMA ===
On 27 October 2014 it was announced that Blencowe had signed with Bellator MMA.

Blencowe made her Bellator debut against Adrienna Jenkins on 15 May 2015 at Bellator 137. She won the fight via TKO in the first round.

In her second fight for the promotion, Blencowe faced Marloes Coenen on 28 August 2015 at Bellator 141. She lost the fight via armbar submission in the second round.

In her third fight for the promotion, Blencowe faced Gabby Holloway on 20 November 2015 at Bellator 146. She won the fight via split decision.

In her fourth fight for the promotion, Blencowe faced Julia Budd on 21 October 2016 at Bellator 162. She lost the bout via majority decision.

After picking up two wins outside of Bellator, Blencowe returned to face Sinead Kavanagh on 25 August 2017 at Bellator 182. She won the fight via split decision.

Blencowe fought for the Bellator Women's Featherweight Championship against Julia Budd in a rematch on 1 December 2017 at Bellator 189. She lost the fight by split decision.

Blencowe faced Amber Leibrock on 29 September 2018 at Bellator at Bellator 206. She won the fight via technical knockout in the third round.

Racking up three straight victories, Blencowe next challenged Cris Cyborg for the Bellator Women's Featherweight World Championship at Bellator 249 on 15 October 2020. She lost the bout via second round submission.

In December 2020, Blencowe signed a new multi-fight contract with Bellator.

Blencowe faced Dayana Silva on 16 July 2021 at Bellator 262. She won the bout via TKO in the third round.

Blencowe faced Pam Sorenson on 12 November 2021 at Bellator 271. She won the bout via unanimous decision.

Blencowe rematched Cris Cyborg for the Bellator Women's Featherweight World Championship on 23 April 2022 at Bellator 279. She lost the bout via unanimous decision.

Blencowe faced Sara McMann on 21 April 2023 at Bellator 294. She lost the bout via unanimous decision.

Blencowe faced Sinead Kavanagh in a rematch on 22 June 2024 at Bellator Champions Series 3 and won the bout by a guillotine choke submission.

On October 8, 2025, Blencowe announced her retirement.

== Championships and accomplishments ==
- Bellator MMA
  - Most fights in Bellator Women's Featherweight division history (15)
  - Tied (Cris Cyborg) for most knockout wins in Bellator Women's Featherweight division history (4)
  - Tied (Cris Cyborg) for most stoppage wins in Bellator Women's Featherweight division history (5)

== Boxing record ==
4 Wins (2 TKOs, 2 decisions), 4 Losses (4 decisions), 0 Draws
Result	Record	Opponent	Type	Rd, Time	Date	Location	Notes
Win	4–4–0	(Thailand) Kewarin Boonme	Referee's Technical Decision		2015-12-12	Sydney, Australia	
Win	3–4–0	(Thailand) Samon Khunurat	TKO		2015-10-03	Sydney, Australia	
Loss	2–4–0	(Australia) Erin McGowan	Unanimous Decision	10	2014-11-21	Perth, Australia	For vacant Women's International Boxing Association World Lightweight Title
Loss	2–3–0	(United States) Tori Nelson	Split Decision	10	2014-09-27	Springfield, Virginia, United States	Fought for WIBA Women's International Boxing Association World welterweight title
Loss	2–2–0	(Australia) Sabrina Ostowari	Unanimous Decision	8	2014-02-14	Queensland, Australia	Fought for the vacant Australia female lightweight title
Win	2–1–0	(New Zealand) Daniella Smith	Unanimous Decision	10 (10)	2013-06-13	Auckland, New Zealand	Fought for vacant WIBA Women's International Boxing Association World light welterweight title Fought for vacant World Boxing Federation female welterweight title
Loss	1–1–0	(Australia) Sarah Howett	Decision	6	2012-10-20	Victoria, Australia	
Win	1–0–0	(Australia) Nadine Brown	Decision	6 (6)	2012-07-08	(Australia) Queensland	Professional debut

== Mixed martial arts record ==
Professional record breakdown
26 matches	16 wins	10 losses
By knockout	8	0
By submission	2	5
By decision	6	5

Res.	Record	Opponent	Method	Event	Date	Round	Time	Location	Notes
Win	16–10	Sinead Kavanagh	Submission (guillotine choke)	Bellator Champions Series 3	22 June 2024	2	3:02	Dublin, Ireland	
Loss	15–10	Sara McMann	Decision (unanimous)	Bellator 294	21 April 2023	3	5:00	Honolulu, Hawaii, United States	
Loss	15–9	Cris Cyborg	Decision (unanimous)	Bellator 279	23 April 2022	5	5:00	Honolulu, Hawaii, United States	For the Bellator Women's Featherweight World Championship. Cyborg was deducted one point in round 1 due to an illegal knee.
Win	15–8	Pam Sorenson	Decision (unanimous)	Bellator 271	12 November 2021	3	5:00	Hollywood, Florida, United States	
Win	14–8	Dayana Silva	TKO (punches)	Bellator 262	16 July 2021	3	1:00	Uncasville, Connecticut, United States	
Loss	13–8	Cris Cyborg	Submission (rear-naked choke)	Bellator 249	15 October 2020	2	2:36	Uncasville, Connecticut, United States	For the Bellator Women's Featherweight World Championship.
Win	13–7	Leslie Smith	Decision (unanimous)	Bellator 233	8 November 2019	3	5:00	Thackerville, Oklahoma, United States	
Win	12–7	Amanda Bell	KO (punches)	Bellator 224	12 July 2019	1	0:22	Thackerville, Oklahoma, United States	
Win	11–7	Amber Leibrock	TKO (slam and punches)	Bellator 206	29 September 2018	3	1:23	San Jose, California, United States	
Loss	10–7	Julia Budd	Decision (split)	Bellator 189	1 December 2017	5	5:00	Thackerville, Oklahoma, United States	For the Bellator Women's Featherweight World Championship.
Win	10–6	Sinead Kavanagh	Decision (split)	Bellator 182	25 August 2017	3	5:00	Verona, New York, United States	Return to Featherweight.
Win	9–6	Rhiannon Thompson	KO (punches)	Australian FC 18	15 April 2017	1	1	Xi'an, China	
Win	8–6	Janay Harding	KO (punches)	Legend MMA 1	28 January 2017	1	1:08	Gold Coast, Australia	Return to Bantamweight.
Loss	7–6	Julia Budd	Decision (majority)	Bellator 162	21 October 2016	3	5:00	Memphis, Tennessee, United States	
Win	7–5	Gabby Holloway	Decision (split)	Bellator 146	20 November 2015	3	5:00	Thackerville, Oklahoma, United States	
Loss	6–5	Marloes Coenen	Submission (armbar)	Bellator 141	28 August 2015	2	3:23	Temecula, California, United States	
Win	6–4	Adrienna Jenkins	TKO (punches)	Bellator 137	15 May 2015	1	4:08	Temecula, California, United States	
Win	5–4	Faith Van Duin	KO (knee to the body)	Storm Damage 5	30 August 2014	3	3:00	Canberra, Australia	Return to Featherweight. Won the Storm MMA Women's Featherweight Championship.
Win	4–4	Kenani Mangakahia	Submission (triangle choke)	FightWorld Cup 17	12 April 2014	1	4:21	Adelaide, Australia	Bantamweight debut.
Win	3–4	Mae-Lin Leow	TKO (punches)	MMA Downunder 4	21 September 2013	1	4:21	Adelaide, Australia	
Loss	2–4	Faith Van Duin	Decision (split)	Storm Damage 3	31 August 2013	3	3:00	Canberra, Australia	Storm MMA Women's Featherweight Tournament Semifinal.
Win	2–3	Maryanne Mullahy	Decision (unanimous)	Storm Damage 3	31 August 2013	3	5:00	Canberra, Australia	Storm MMA Women's Featherweight Tournament Quarterfinal.
Loss	1–3	Kate Da Silva	Submission (rear-naked choke)	Storm Damage 3	31 August 2013	2	3:00	Canberra, Australia	Storm MMA Women's Featherweight Tournament Quarterfinal.
Loss	1–2	Jessica-Rose Clark	Submission (rear-naked choke)	Nitro MMA 9	18 December 2013	2	3:38	Logan City, Australia	
Win	1–1	Kerry Barrett	Decision (split)	Brace For War 20	25 May 2013	5	5:00	Brisbane, Australia	
Loss	0–1	Kyra Purcell	Submission (armbar)	FightWorld Cup 14	13 April 2013	2	1:27	Nerang, Australia	Featherweight debut.

== See also ==
- List of female boxers
- List of female mixed martial artists
