= List of Bellator MMA champions =

Bellator MMA (formerly known as "Bellator Fighting Championships") was an American mixed martial arts promotion, and the following is a history of its champions in each weight class.

At the time of its inception in 2008, CEO Bjorn Rebney founded Bellator Fighting Championships as a tournament based organization. The inaugural champion for each weight class was determined by the winner of an eight-man tournament. All subsequent title challengers were required to first win an eight-man tournament in a specific weight class in order to earn the right to challenge that division's reigning champion. Dethroned champions were required to re-enter the tournaments in order to attempt to regain their title. Under Bjorn Rebney's sole leadership, Bellator MMA would strictly adhere to these rules during the first four years of its operation.

The first changes to this format would begin to appear not long after Viacom, Inc. purchased a controlling stake in the organization. In November 2012, CEO Bjorn Rebney announced the introduction of a "championship rematch clause". This would allow Bellator to schedule an immediate title-fight rematch if officials deemed the fight necessary. The next major change occurred during Bellator's 2013 Summer Series when it was announced that all three tournaments would be shorter, four-man affairs instead of the standard eight. Though originally stated to return to the eight-man only tournaments afterwards, officials instead decided to add two additional four-man tournaments to the existing tournament lineup in an effort to provide a more consistent flow of title challengers for their champions to face.

Two additional rule changes would be announced. The first was the "tournament champion replacement clause" introduced in August 2013. This allowed officials to grant title shots to replacement fighters when tournament winners were injured, or otherwise unavailable, through a complex voting and points system. Then, in June 2014, CEO Bjorn Rebney made an announcement stating that any fighter who had previously won a Bellator tournament would maintain permanent eligibility to fight for a title without having to re-enter another tournament. Neither of these changes would ever be implemented, however, as one week later Bellator MMA and its founder and CEO Bjorn Rebney parted ways, bringing about an end to the organization's tournament based model.

== Champions overview ==
Men

Division	Inaugural Champion	Last Champion	Inaugurated on	Deactivated on
Heavyweight	(United States) Cole Konrad	(United States) Ryan Bader	October 14, 2010	March 26, 2025
Light Heavyweight	(Democratic Republic of the Congo) Christian M'Pumbu	(United States) Corey Anderson	May 21, 2011	October 3, 2025
Middleweight	(Australia) Héctor Lombard	(United States) Johnny Eblen	June 19, 2009	July 19, 2025
Welterweight	(United States) Lyman Good	(Russia) Ramazan Kuramagomedov	June 12, 2009	February 7, 2026
Lightweight	(United States) Eddie Alvarez	(Russia) Usman Nurmagomedov	June 19, 2009	October 3, 2025
Featherweight	(United States) Joe Soto	(Brazil) Patrício Pitbull	June 5, 2009	April 12, 2025
Bantamweight	(United States) Zach Makovsky	(United States) Patchy Mix	October 14, 2010	May 13, 2025

Women

Division	Inaugural Champion	Last Champion	Inaugurated on	Deactivated on
Featherweight	(Canada) Julia Budd	(Brazil) Cris Cyborg	March 3, 2017	December 13, 2025
Flyweight	(United States) Ilima-Lei Macfarlane	(United States) Liz Carmouche	November 3, 2017	October 16, 2026
Strawweight	(United States) Zoila Frausto	(United States) Zoila Frausto	October 28, 2010	February 5, 2013

== Men's championship history ==
=== Heavyweight World Championship ===
206 to 265 lbs (93 to 120 kg)

No.	Name	Event	Date	Reign	Defenses
1	(United States) Cole Konrad def. Neil Grove	Bellator 32; Kansas City, MO, US	Oct 14, 2010	699 days	1. def. Eric Prindle at Bellator 70 on May 25, 2012
Konrad vacated the title on September 12, 2012 when he retired from MMA competition.
2	(Russia) Alexander Volkov def. Rich Hale	Bellator 84; Hammond, IN, US	Dec 14, 2012	337 days	
3	(Russia) Vitaly Minakov	Bellator 108; Atlantic City, NJ, US	Nov 15, 2013	911 days	1. def. Cheick Kongo at Bellator 115 on Apr 4, 2014
Minakov was stripped of the title on May 14, 2016 after failing to make title defenses.
4	(United States) Ryan Bader def. Fedor Emelianenko	Bellator 214; Inglewood, CA, US	Jan 26, 2019	2,251 days	NC. vs. Cheick Kongo at Bellator 226 on Sep 7, 2019; 1. def. interim champion Valentin Moldavsky at Bellator 273 on Jan 29, 2022; 2. def. Cheick Kongo at Bellator 280 on May 6, 2022; 3. def. Fedor Emelianenko at Bellator 290 on Feb 4, 2023
—	(Russia) Valentin Moldavsky def. Timothy Johnson for interim title	Bellator 261; Uncasville, CT, US	Jun 25, 2021	—	
Bader was released from Bellator on March 26, 2025. The title was subsequently deactivated.

=== Light Heavyweight World Championship ===
186 to 205 lbs (84 to 93 kg)

No.	Name	Event	Date	Reign	Defenses
1	(Democratic Republic of the Congo) Christian M'Pumbu def. Rich Hale	Bellator 45; Lake Charles, LA, US	May 21, 2011	650 days	
2	(Slovakia) Attila Végh	Bellator 91; Rio Rancho, NM, US	Feb 28, 2013	387 days	
—	(United States) Emanuel Newton def. Muhammed Lawal for interim title	Bellator 106; Long Beach, CA, US	Nov 2, 2013	—	
3	(United States) Emanuel Newton	Bellator 113; Mulvane, KS, US	Mar 21, 2014	343 days	1. def. Joey Beltran at Bellator 124 on Sep 12, 2014; 2. def. Linton Vassell at Bellator 130 on Oct 24, 2014
4	(England) Liam McGeary	Bellator 134; Uncasville, CT, US	Feb 27, 2015	617 days	1. def. Tito Ortiz at Bellator 142: Dynamite 1 on Sep 19, 2015
5	(United States) Phil Davis	Bellator 163; Uncasville, CT, US	Nov 4, 2016	232 days	
6	(United States) Ryan Bader	Bellator 180; New York City, NY, US	Jun 24, 2017	1,155 days	1. def. Linton Vassell at Bellator 186 on Nov 3, 2017
7	(Russia) Vadim Nemkov	Bellator 244; Uncasville, CT, US	Aug 21, 2020	1,244 days	1. def. Phil Davis at Bellator 257 on Apr 16, 2021; 2. def. Julius Anglickas at Bellator 268 on Oct 16, 2021; NC. vs. Corey Anderson at Bellator 277 on Apr 15, 2022; 3. def. Corey Anderson at Bellator 288 on Nov 18, 2022; 4. def. Yoel Romero at Bellator 297 on Jun 16, 2023
Nemkov vacated the title after announcing his move to Heavyweight on January 17, 2024.
8	(United States) Corey Anderson def. Karl Moore	Bellator Champions Series 1 Belfast, Northern Ireland	Mar 22, 2024	560 days	
The title was officially deactivated on October 3, 2025 in favor of continuing the lineage of the PFL Light Heavyweight World Championship.

=== Middleweight World Championship ===
171 to 185 lbs (77 to 84 kg)

No.	Name	Event	Date	Reign	Defenses
1	(Australia) Héctor Lombard def. Jared Hess	Bellator 12; Hollywood, FL, US	Jun 19, 2009	1,040 days	1. def. Alexander Shlemenko at Bellator 34 on Oct 28, 2010
Lombard vacated the title on April 24, 2012 when he left Bellator for the UFC.
2	(Russia) Alexander Shlemenko def. Maiquel Falcão	Bellator 88; Duluth, GA, US	Feb 7, 2013	597 days	1. def. Brett Cooper at Bellator 98 on Sep 7, 2013; 2. def. Doug Marshall at Bellator 109 on Nov 22, 2013; 3. def. Brennan Ward at Bellator 114 on Mar 28, 2014
3	(United States) Brandon Halsey	Bellator 126; Phoenix, AZ, US	Sep 26, 2014	230 days	
Halsey was stripped of the title on May 14, 2015 after failing to make weight for his title defense against Kendall Grove at Bellator 137.
4	(Brazil) Rafael Carvalho def. Brandon Halsey	Bellator 144; Uncasville, CT, US	Oct 23, 2015	945 days	1. def. Melvin Manhoef at Bellator 155 on May 20, 2016; 2. def. Melvin Manhoef at Bellator 176 on Apr 8, 2017; 3. def. Alessio Sakara at Bellator 190 on Dec 9, 2017
5	(Netherlands) Gegard Mousasi	Bellator 200; London, England	May 25, 2018	394 days	1. def. Rory MacDonald at Bellator 206 on Sep 29, 2018
6	(United States) Rafael Lovato Jr.	Bellator 223; London, England	Jun 22, 2019	233 days	
Lovato vacated the title on February 10, 2020 when it was revealed he had been diagnosed with a cerebral cavernoma.
7	(Netherlands) Gegard Mousasi (2) def. Douglas Lima	Bellator 250; Uncasville, CT, US	Oct 29, 2020	604 days (998 days)	1. def. John Salter at Bellator 264 on Aug 13, 2021; 2. def. Austin Vanderford at Bellator 275 on Feb 25, 2022
8	(United States) Johnny Eblen	Bellator 282; Uncasville, CT, US	Jun 24, 2022	1121 days	1. def. Anatoly Tokov at Bellator 290 on Feb 4, 2023; 2. def. Fabian Edwards at Bellator 299 on Sep 23, 2023; 3. def. Fabian Edwards at PFL Super Fights: Battle of the Giants on Oct 19, 2024
The title was officially deactivated on July 19, 2025 in favor of continuing the lineage of the PFL Middleweight World Championship.

=== Welterweight World Championship ===
156 to 170 lbs (70 to 77 kg)

No.	Name	Event	Date	Reign	Defenses
1	(United States) Lyman Good def. Omar de la Cruz	Bellator 11; Uncasville, CT, US	Jun 12, 2009	485 days	
2	(United States) Ben Askren	Bellator 33; Philadelphia, PA, US	Oct 21, 2010	1,120 days	1. def. Jay Hieron at Bellator 56 on Oct 29, 2011; 2. def. Douglas Lima at Bellator 64 on Apr 6, 2012; 3. def. Karl Amoussou at Bellator 86 on Jan 24, 2013; 4. def. Andrey Koreshkov at Bellator 97 on Jul 31, 2013
Askren vacated the title on November 14, 2013 when he left Bellator for ONE FC.
3	(Brazil) Douglas Lima def. Rick Hawn	Bellator 117; Council Bluffs, IA, US	Apr 18, 2014	455 days	
4	(Russia) Andrey Koreshkov	Bellator 140; Uncasville, CT, US	Jul 17, 2015	482 days	1. def. Benson Henderson at Bellator 153 on Apr 22, 2016
5	(Brazil) Douglas Lima (2)	Bellator 164; Tel Aviv, Israel	Nov 10, 2016	437 days (892 days)	1. def. Lorenz Larkin at Bellator NYC on Jun 24, 2017
6	(Canada) Rory MacDonald	Bellator 192; Inglewood, CA, US	Jan 20, 2018	644 days	1. drew with Jon Fitch at Bellator 220 on Apr 27, 2019; 2. def. Neiman Gracie at Bellator 222 on Jun 14, 2019
7	(Brazil) Douglas Lima (3)	Bellator 232; Uncasville, CT, US	Oct 26, 2019	594 days (1,486 days)	
8	(Ukraine) Yaroslav Amosov	Bellator 260; Uncasville, CT, US	Jun 11, 2021	890 days	1. def. interim champion Logan Storley at Bellator 291 on Feb 25, 2023
—	(United States) Logan Storley def. Michael Page for interim title	Bellator 281; London, England	May 13, 2022	—	
9	(Jamaica) Jason Jackson	Bellator 301; Chicago, IL, US	Nov 17, 2023	218 days	
10	(Russia) Ramazan Kuramagomedov	Bellator Champions Series 3 Dublin, Ireland	Jun 22, 2024	595 days	
The title was officially deactivated on February 7, 2026 in favor of continuing the lineage of the PFL Welterweight World Championship.

=== Lightweight World Championship ===
146 to 155 lbs (66 to 70 kg)

No.	Name	Event	Date	Reign	Defenses
1	(United States) Eddie Alvarez def. Toby Imada	Bellator 12; Hollywood, FL, US	Jun 19, 2009	883 days	1. def. Pat Curran at Bellator 39 on April 2, 2011
2	(United States) Michael Chandler	Bellator 58; Hollywood, FL, US	Nov 19, 2011	715 days	1. def. Rick Hawn at Bellator 85 on Jan 17, 2013; 2. def. David Rickels at Bellator 97 on Jul 31, 2013
3	(United States) Eddie Alvarez (2)	Bellator 106; Long Beach, CA, US	Nov 2, 2013	290 days (1,123 days)	
—	(United States) Will Brooks def. Michael Chandler for interim title	Bellator 120; Southaven, MS, US	May 17, 2014	—	
Alvarez vacated the title on August 19, 2014 when he left Bellator for the UFC.
4	(United States) Will Brooks def. Michael Chandler for undisputed title (Note: Brooks was not promoted to champion, due to his desire not to renew with the event and the possibility of losing the last two champions of the division to a rival organization.)	Bellator 131; San Diego, CA, US	Nov 15, 2014	546 days	1. def. Dave Jansen at Bellator 136 on Apr 10, 2015; 2. def. Marcin Held at Bellator 145 on Nov 6, 2015
Brooks vacated the title on May 14, 2016 when he left Bellator for the UFC.
5	(United States) Michael Chandler (2) def. Patricky Pitbull	Bellator 157; St. Louis, MO, US	Jun 24, 2016	365 days (1,080 days)	1. def. Benson Henderson at Bellator 165 on Nov 19, 2016
6	(United States) Brent Primus	Bellator NYC; New York City, NY, US	Jun 24, 2017	539 days	
7	(United States) Michael Chandler (3)	Bellator 212; Honolulu, HI, US	Dec 14, 2018	149 days (1,229 days)	
8	(Brazil) Patrício Pitbull	Bellator 221; Rosemont, IL, US	May 11, 2019	879 days	
Patrício vacated the title on October 6, 2021.
9	(Brazil) Patricky Pitbull def. Peter Queally	Bellator 270; Dublin, Ireland	Nov 5, 2021	378 days	
10	(Russia) Usman Nurmagomedov	Bellator 288; Chicago, IL, US	Nov 18, 2022	1050 days	1. def. Benson Henderson at Bellator 292 on Mar 10, 2023; NC. vs. Brent Primus at Bellator 300 on Oct 7, 2023; 2. def. Alexandr Shabliy at Bellator Champions Series 4 on Sep 8, 2024; 3. def. Paul Hughes at PFL Champions Series 1 on Jan 25, 2025
The title was officially deactivated on October 3, 2025 in favor of continuing the lineage of the PFL Lightweight World Championship.

=== Featherweight World Championship ===
136 to 145 lbs (61 to 66 kg)

No.	Name	Event	Date	Reign	Defenses
1	(United States) Joe Soto def. Yahir Reyes	Bellator 10; Ontario, CA, US	Jun 5, 2009	454 days	
2	(United States) Joe Warren	Bellator 27; San Antonio, TX, US	Sep 2, 2010	554 days	
3	(United States) Pat Curran	Bellator 60; Hammond, IN, US	Mar 9, 2012	604 days	1. def. Patrício Pitbull at Bellator 85 on Jan 17, 2013; 2. def. Shahbulat Shamhalaev at Bellator 95 on Apr 4, 2013
4	(United States) Daniel Straus	Bellator 106; Long Beach, CA, US	Nov 2, 2013	133 days	
5	(United States) Pat Curran (2)	Bellator 112; Hammond, IN, US	Mar 14, 2014	176 days (780 days)	
6	(Brazil) Patrício Pitbull	Bellator 123; Uncasville, CT, US	Sep 5, 2014	428 days	1. def. Daniel Straus at Bellator 132 on Jan 16, 2015; 2. def. Daniel Weichel at Bellator 138 on Jun 19, 2015
7	(United States) Daniel Straus (2)	Bellator 145; St. Louis, MO, US	Nov 6, 2015	532 days (665 days)	
8	(Brazil) Patrício Pitbull (2)	Bellator 178; Uncasville, CT, US	Apr 21, 2017	1,562 days (1,990 days)	1. def. Daniel Weichel at Bellator 203 on Jul 14, 2018; 2. def. Emmanuel Sanchez at Bellator 209 on Nov 15, 2018; 3. def. Juan Archuleta at Bellator 228 on Sep 28, 2019; 4. def. Pedro Carvalho at Bellator 252 on Nov 12, 2020; 5. def. Emmanuel Sanchez at Bellator 255 on Apr 2, 2021
9	(United States) A. J. McKee	Bellator 263; Inglewood, CA, US	Jul 31, 2021	259 days	
10	(Brazil) Patrício Pitbull (3)	Bellator 277; San Jose, CA, US	Apr 15, 2022	1,093 days (3,083 days)	1. def. Ádám Borics at Bellator 286 on Oct 1, 2022; 2. def. Jeremy Kennedy at Bellator Champions Series 1 on Mar 22, 2024
Pitbull was released from Bellator on January 14, 2025. The title was officially vacated on April 12, 2025. The title was subsequently deactivated.

=== Bantamweight World Championship ===
126 to 135 lbs (57 to 61 kg)

No.	Name	Event	Date	Reign	Defenses
1	(United States) Zach Makovsky def. Ed West	Bellator 32; Kansas City, MO, US	Oct 14, 2010	547 days	
2	(Brazil) Eduardo Dantas	Bellator 65; Atlantic City, NJ, US	Apr 13, 2012	911 days	1. def. Marcos Galvão at Bellator 89 on Feb 14, 2013; 2. def. Anthony Leone at Bellator 111 on Mar 8, 2014
-	(United States) Joe Warren def. Rafael Silva for interim title	Bellator 118; Atlantic City, NJ, US	May 2, 2014	—	
3	(United States) Joe Warren	Bellator 128; Thackerville, OK, US	Oct 10, 2014	169 days	
4	(Brazil) Marcos Galvão	Bellator 135; Thackerville, OK, US	Mar 27, 2015	448 days	
5	(Brazil) Eduardo Dantas (2)	Bellator 156; Fresno, CA, US	Jun 17, 2016	477 days (1,338 days)	1. def. Joe Warren at Bellator 166 on Dec 2, 2016
6	(United States) Darrion Caldwell	Bellator 184; Thackerville, OK, US	Oct 6, 2017	617 days	1. def. Leandro Higo at Bellator 195 on Mar 2, 2018
7	(Japan) Kyoji Horiguchi	Bellator 222; New York City, NY, US	Jun 14, 2019	166 days	
Horiguchi vacated the title on November 27, 2019 for the division not to stagnate when he announced he was injured.
8	(United States) Juan Archuleta def. Patchy Mix	Bellator 246; Uncasville, CT, US	Sep 12, 2020	237 days	
9	(United States) Sergio Pettis	Bellator 258; Uncasville, CT, US	May 7, 2021	925 days	1. def. Kyoji Horiguchi at Bellator 272 on Dec 3, 2021; 2. def. Patrício Pitbull at Bellator 297 on Jun 16, 2023
—	(United States) Raufeon Stots def. Juan Archuleta for interim title	Bellator 279; Honolulu, HI, US	Apr 23, 2022	—	1. def. Danny Sabatello at Bellator 289 on Dec 9, 2022
—	(United States) Patchy Mix def. interim champion Raufeon Stots	Bellator 295; Honolulu, HI, US	Apr 22, 2023	—	
10	(United States) Patchy Mix	Bellator 301; Chicago, IL, US	Nov 17, 2023	543 days	1. def. Magomed Magomedov at Bellator Champions Series 2 on May 17, 2024
Mix vacated the title on May 13, 2025 when he left Bellator for the UFC. The title was subsequently deactivated.

=== Flyweight World Championship ===
116 to 125 lb (53 to 57 kg)
Kyoji Horiguchi and Makoto Takahashi fought for the inaugural title on July 30, 2023, at Bellator MMA x Rizin 2. The fight ended in a no-contest after an unintentional eye poke rendered Takahashi unable to continue.

== Women's championship history ==
=== Women's Featherweight World Championship ===
126 to 145 lbs (57 to 66 kg)

No.	Name	Event	Date	Reign	Defenses
1	(Canada) Julia Budd def. Marloes Coenen	Bellator 174; Thackerville, OK, US	Mar 3, 2017	1,058 days	1. def. Arlene Blencowe at Bellator 189 on Dec 1, 2017; 2. def. Talita Nogueira at Bellator 202 on Jul 13, 2018; 3. def. Olga Rubin at Bellator 224 on Jul 12, 2019
2	(Brazil) Cris Cyborg	Bellator 238; Inglewood, CA, US	Jan 25, 2020	2149 days	1. def. Arlene Blencowe at Bellator 249 on Oct 15, 2020; 2. def. Leslie Smith at Bellator 259 on May 21, 2021; 3. def. Sinead Kavanagh at Bellator 271 on Nov 12, 2021; 4. def. Arlene Blencowe at Bellator 279 on Apr 23, 2022; 5. def. Cat Zingano at Bellator 300 on Oct 7, 2023
The title was officially deactivated on December 13, 2025 in favor of continuing the lineage of the PFL Women's Featherweight World Championship.

=== Women's Flyweight World Championship ===
116 to 125 lbs (53 to 57 kg)

No.	Name	Event	Date	Reign	Defenses
1	(United States) Ilima-Lei Macfarlane def. Emily Ducote	Bellator 186; University Park, PA, US	Nov 3, 2017	1,133 days	1. def. Alejandra Lara at Bellator 201 on Jun 29, 2018; 2. def. Valérie Létourneau at Bellator 213 on Dec 15, 2018; 3. def. Veta Arteaga at Bellator 220 on Apr 27, 2019; 4. def. Kate Jackson at Bellator 236 on Dec 21, 2019
2	(Brazil) Juliana Velasquez	Bellator 254; Uncasville, CT, US	Dec 10, 2020	498 days	1. def. Denise Kielholtz at Bellator 262 on Jul 16, 2021
3	(United States) Liz Carmouche	Bellator 278; Honolulu, HI, US	Apr 23, 2022	1,627 days	1. def. Juliana Velasquez at Bellator 289 on Dec 9, 2022; 2. def. DeAnna Bennett at Bellator 294 on April 21, 2023; 3. def. Ilima-Lei Macfarlane at Bellator 300 on Oct 7, 2023
The title was officially deactivated on October 16, 2026 in favor of continuing the lineage of the PFL Women's Flyweight World Championship.

=== Women's Strawweight World Championship ===
Under 115 pounds (52 kg)

No.	Name	Event	Date	Reign	Defenses
1	(United States) Zoila Frausto def. Megumi Fujii	Bellator 34; Hollywood, FL, US	Oct 28, 2010	831 days	
Frausto vacated the title on February 5, 2013 when she sign with Invicta FC. The title was subsequently deactivated.

== Tournament winners ==
Originally, all title challengers were determined through these tournaments with the winners earning the right to challenge the reigning champion at that weight class or, if necessary, be allowed to compete for an interim or vacant title.

=== Bellator Fighting Championships: Season One ===
(April 3, 2009 - June 19, 2009)

Weight Division	Champion	Runner-up	Event	Date
Middleweight	(Australia) Hector Lombard	(United States) Jared Hess	Bellator 12	Jun 19, 2009
Welterweight	(United States) Lyman Good	(Dominican Republic) Omar De La Cruz	Bellator 11	Jun 12, 2009
Lightweight	(United States) Eddie Alvarez	(United States) Toby Imada	Bellator 12	Jun 19, 2009
Featherweight	(United States) Joe Soto	(Mexico) Yahir Reyes	Bellator 10	Jun 5, 2009

1: Tournament determined the inaugural Bellator Middleweight Champion.
2: Tournament determined the inaugural Bellator Welterweight Champion.
3: Tournament determined the inaugural Bellator Lightweight Champion.
4: Tournament determined the inaugural Bellator Featherweight Champion.

=== Bellator Fighting Championships: Season Two ===
(April 8, 2010 - June 24, 2010)

Weight Division	Champion	Runner-up	Event	Date
Middleweight	(Russia) Alexander Shlemenko	(United States) Bryan Baker	Bellator 23	Jun 24, 2010
Welterweight	(United States) Ben Askren	(United States) Dan Hornbuckle	Bellator 22	Jun 17, 2010
Lightweight	(United States) Pat Curran	(United States) Toby Imada	Bellator 21	Jun 10, 2010
Featherweight	(United States) Joe Warren	(Brazil) Patrício Pitbull	Bellator 23	Jun 24, 2010

=== Bellator Fighting Championships: Season Three ===
(August 12, 2010 - October 28, 2010)

Weight Division	Champion	Runner-up	Event	Date
Heavyweight	(United States) Cole Konrad	(South Africa) Neil Grove	Bellator 32	Oct 14, 2010
Bantamweight	(United States) Zach Makovsky	(Philippines) Ed West	Bellator 32	Oct 14, 2010
Women's Strawweight	(United States) Zoila Gurgel	(Japan) Megumi Fujii	Bellator 34	Oct 28, 2010

1: Tournament determined the inaugural Bellator Heavyweight Champion.
2: Tournament determined the inaugural Bellator Bantamweight Champion.
3: Tournament determined the inaugural Bellator Women's Strawweight Champion.

=== Bellator Fighting Championships: Season Four ===
(March 5, 2011 - May 21, 2011)

Weight Division	Champion	Runner-up	Event	Date
Light Heavyweight	(Democratic Republic of the Congo) Christian M'Pumbu	(United States) Rich Hale	Bellator 45	May 21, 2011
Welterweight	(United States) Jay Hieron	(United States) Rick Hawn	Bellator 43	May 7, 2011
Lightweight	(United States) Michael Chandler	(Brazil) Patricky Pitbull	Bellator 44	May 14, 2011
Featherweight	(Brazil) Patrício Pitbull	(United States) Daniel Straus	Bellator 45	May 21, 2011

1: Tournament determined the inaugural Bellator Light Heavyweight Champion.

=== Bellator Fighting Championships: 2011 Summer Series ===
(June 25, 2011 - August 20, 2011)

Weight Division	Champion	Runner-up	Event	Date
Featherweight	(United States) Pat Curran (2)	(Brazil) Marlon Sandro	Bellator 48	Aug 20, 2011

=== Bellator Fighting Championships: Season Five ===
(September 27, 2011 - November 26, 2011)

Weight Division	Champion	Runner-up	Event	Date
Heavyweight	(United States) Eric Prindle	(Brazil) Thiago Santos	Bellator 62	Mar 23, 2012
Middleweight	(Russia) Alexander Shlemenko (2)	(Brazil) Vitor Vianna	Bellator 57	Nov 12, 2011
Welterweight	(Brazil) Douglas Lima	(United States) Ben Saunders	Bellator 57	Nov 12, 2011
Bantamweight	(Brazil) Eduardo Dantas	(Cuba) Alexis Vila	Bellator 59	Nov 26, 2011

1: Following a no contest in the finals at Bellator 59, a rematch between Prindle and Santos was cancelled at Bellator 61, and again at Bellator 62 when Santos was unable to make weight. Prindle was awarded the tournament victory.
2: Shlemenko next faced Season Six tournament winner Maiquel Falcão for the vacant middleweight title.

=== Bellator Fighting Championships: Season Six ===
(March 9, 2012 - May 25, 2012)

Weight Division	Champion	Runner-up	Event	Date
Middleweight	(Brazil) Maiquel Falcão	(Sweden) Andreas Spång	Bellator 69	May 18, 2012
Welterweight	(France) Karl Amoussou	(United States) Bryan Baker	Bellator 72	Jul 20, 2012
Lightweight	(United States) Rick Hawn	(United States) Brent Weedman	Bellator 70	May 25, 2012
Featherweight	(United States) Daniel Straus	(Brazil) Marlon Sandro	Bellator 68	May 11, 2012
Bantamweight	(Brazil) Marcos Galvão	(Brazil) Luis Nogueira	Bellator 73	Aug 24, 2012

1: Falcão next faced Season Five tournament winner Alexander Shlemenko for the vacant middleweight title.

=== Bellator Fighting Championships: 2012 Summer Series ===
(June 22, 2012 - July 24, 2012)

Weight Division	Champion	Runner-up	Event	Date
Light Heavyweight	(Slovakia) Attila Vegh	(United States) Travis Wiuff	Bellator 73	Aug 24, 2012

=== Bellator Fighting Championships: Season Seven ===
(September 28, 2012 - December 14, 2012)

Weight Division	Champion	Runner-up	Event	Date
Heavyweight	(Russia) Alexander Volkov	(United States) Richard Hale	Bellator 84	Dec 14, 2012
Welterweight	(Russia) Andrey Koreshkov	(United States) Lyman Good	Bellator 82	Nov 30, 2012
Lightweight	(United States) Dave Jansen	(Poland) Marcin Held	Bellator 93	Mar 21, 2013
Featherweight	(Russia) Shahbulat Shamhalaev	(United States) Rad Martinez	Bellator 90	Feb 21, 2013

1: Tournament determined the new Bellator Heavyweight champion.
2: After an extended layoff due to injury, Jansen would choose to forfeit his title shot for the opportunity to take an immediate fight upon his return.

=== Bellator Fighting Championships: Season Eight ===
(January 17, 2013 - April 4, 2013)

Weight Division	Champion	Runner-up	Event	Date
Light Heavyweight	(United States) Emanuel Newton	(Russia) Mikhail Zayats	Bellator 94	Mar 28, 2013
Middleweight	(United States) Doug Marshall	(United States) Brett Cooper	Bellator 95	April 4, 2013
Welterweight	(Brazil) Douglas Lima (2)	(United States) Ben Saunders	Bellator 100	Sep 20, 2013
Lightweight	(United States) David Rickels	(United States) Saad Awad	Bellator 94	Mar 28, 2013
Featherweight	(Russia) Magomedrasul Khasbulaev	(United States) Mike Richman	Bellator 95	Apr 4, 2013

1: Newton next faced 2013 Summer Series tournament winner Muhammed Lawal for the Interim Light Heavyweight title.
2: After repeated visa issues prevented Khasbulaev from returning to the USA to claim his title shot, the fighter was granted his release from the promotion in December 2014.
3: Lima next faced Season Nine tournament winner Rick Hawn for the vacant welterweight title.

=== Bellator Fighting Championships: 2013 Summer Series ===
(June 19, 2013 - July 31, 2013)
All three tournaments were shortened, four-man tournaments instead of the standard eight.

Weight Division	Champion	Runner-up	Event	Date
Heavyweight	(Russia) Vitaly Minakov	(United States) Ryan Martinez	Bellator 97	Jul 31, 2013
Light Heavyweight	(United States) Muhammed Lawal	(United States) Jacob Noe	Bellator 97	Jul 31, 2013
Bantamweight	(Brazil) Rafael Silva	(United States) Anthony Leone	Bellator 102	Oct 4, 2013

1: Lawal next faced Season Eight tournament winner Emanuel Newton for the Interim Light Heavyweight title.
2: Silva next faced Season Nine tournament winner Joe Warren for the Interim Bantamweight title.

=== Bellator MMA: Season Nine ===
(September 7, 2013 - November 22, 2013)

Weight Division	Champion	Runner-up	Event	Date
Heavyweight	(France) Cheick Kongo	(Australia) Peter Graham	Bellator 107	November 8, 2013
Middleweight	(United States) Brennan Ward	(Denmark) Mikkel Parlo	Bellator 107	Nov 8, 2013
Welterweight	(United States) Rick Hawn (2)	(United States) Ron Keslar	Bellator 109	Nov 22, 2013
Lightweight	(United States) Will Brooks	(Russia) Alexander Sarnavskiy	Bellator 109	Nov 22, 2013
Featherweight	(Brazil) Patrício Pitbull (2)	(United States) Justin Wilcox	Bellator 108	Nov 15, 2013
Bantamweight	(United States) Joe Warren (2)	(United States) Travis Marx	Bellator 107	Nov 8, 2013

1: Tournament was a shortened, four-man tournament instead of the standard eight.
2: Hawn next faced Season Eight tournament winner Douglas Lima for the vacant welterweight title.
3: Brooks next faced former champion Michael Chandler for the Interim Lightweight Championship at Bellator 120. Chandler was originally scheduled for an immediate rematch with champion Eddie Alvarez at the event.
4: Warren next faced 2013 Summer Series tournament winner Rafael Silva for the Interim Bantamweight title.

=== Bellator MMA: Season Ten ===
(February 28, 2014 – May 17, 2014)

Weight Division	Champion	Runner-up	Event	Date
Heavyweight	(Russia) Alexander Volkov (2)	(Bulgaria) Blagoy Ivanov	Bellator 120	May 17, 2014
Light Heavyweight	(United States) Quinton Jackson	(United States) Muhammed Lawal	Bellator 120	May 17, 2014
Middleweight	(United States) Brandon Halsey	(United States) Brett Cooper	Bellator 122	July 25, 2014
Welterweight	(Russia) Andrey Koreshkov (2)	(United States) Adam McDonough	Bellator 122	Jul 25, 2014
Lightweight	(Poland) Marcin Held	(Brazil) Patricky Pitbull	Bellator 126	Sep 26, 2014
Featherweight	(Germany) Daniel Weichel	(United States) Desmond Green	Bellator 119	May 9, 2014

1: Despite initial assurances to the contrary, Bellator's new management would not honor the title shots Volkov, Weichel and Held earned while under the tournament format.
2: Tournament was a shortened, four-man tournament instead of the standard eight.
3: Jackson would end up leaving Bellator MMA for the UFC and never claim his title shot.

=== Bellator MMA: 2014 Summer Series ===
(June 6, 2014 – July 25, 2014)

Weight Division	Champion	Runner-up	Event	Date
Light Heavyweight	(England) Liam McGeary	(United States) Kelly Anundson	Bellator 124	Sep 14, 2014

=== Bellator MMA: Dynamite 1 ===
(September 19, 2015)
A one night, four-man light heavyweight tournament.

Weight Division	Champion	Runner-up	Event	Date
Light Heavyweight	(United States) Phil Davis	(France) Francis Carmont	Bellator 142: Dynamite 1	Sep 19, 2015

=== Bellator Heavyweight World Grand Prix Tournament ===
(January 20, 2018 - January 26, 2019)
Year long, eight-man heavyweight tournament to crown a new heavyweight champion.

Weight Division	Champion	Runner-up	Event	Date
Heavyweight	(United States) Ryan Bader	(Russia) Fedor Emelianenko	Bellator 214: Fedor vs. Bader	Jan 26, 2019

=== Bellator Welterweight World Grand Prix Tournament ===
(September 29, 2018 - October 26, 2019)
Year long, eight-man welterweight tournament. Current welterweight champion, Rory MacDonald, is a participant and will defend the title until the end of the tournament. If he loses, the winner will be declared the new linear champion.

Weight Division	Champion	Runner-up	Event	Date
Welterweight	(Brazil) Douglas Lima (3)	(Canada) Rory MacDonald	Bellator 232	Oct 26, 2019

=== Bellator Featherweight World Grand Prix Tournament ===
(September 28, 2019 - July 31, 2021)
Year long, sixteen-man featherweight tournament. Current featherweight champion, Patrício Freire, is a participant and will defend the title until the end of the tournament. If he loses, the winner will be declared the new linear champion.

Weight Division	Champion	Runner-up	Event	Date
Featherweight	(United States) A. J. McKee	(Brazil) Patrício Pitbull	Bellator 263	Jul 31, 2021

=== Bellator Light Heavyweight World Grand Prix Tournament ===
(April 9, 2021 - November 18, 2022)
Year long, eight-man Light Heavyweight tournament. Current Light Heavyweight champion, Vadim Nemkov, is a participant and will defend the title until the end of the tournament. If he loses, the winner will be declared the new linear champion.

Weight Division	Champion	Runner-up	Event	Date
Light Heavyweight	(Russia) Vadim Nemkov	(United States) Corey Anderson	Bellator 288	Nov 18, 2022

=== Bellator Bantamweight World Grand Prix Tournament ===
(April 22, 2022 - April 22, 2023)
Year long, ten-man Bantamweight tournament.

Weight Division	Champion	Runner-up	Event	Date
Bantamweight	(United States) Patchy Mix	(United States) Raufeon Stots	Bellator 295	April 22, 2023

=== Bellator Lightweight World Grand Prix Tournament ===
(March 10, 2023 - Present)
Year long, eight-man Bantamweight tournament. Current Lightweight champion, Usman Nurmagomedov, is a participant and will defend the title until the end of the tournament. If he loses, the winner will be declared the new linear champion.

Weight Division	Champion	Runner-up	Event	Date
Lightweight	TBD	TBD	TBD	

== Champions by nationality ==
The division champions includes only linear champions. Interim champions who have never become linear champions will be listed as interim champions. Fighters with multiple title reigns in a specific division will also be counted once. Tournaments runners-up are not included.

Country	Division champions	Interim champions	Tournament champions	Total
United States	26	2	29	55
Brazil	9	—	9	18
Russia	5	1	9	15
Canada	2	—	—	2
Australia	1	—	1	2
(Democratic Republic of the Congo) D.R. Congo	1	—	1	2
England	1	—	1	2
Slovakia	1	—	1	2
Japan	1	—	—	1
Netherlands	1	—	—	1
Ukraine	1	—	—	1
France	—	—	2	2
Germany	—	—	1	1
Poland	—	—	1	1

== Records ==
=== Most wins in title bouts ===
The following includes all fighters with three or more championship and/or interim championship title wins. Fighters with the same number of title wins are arranged in order of less title bouts losses. Tournament championships are not included.

Title wins	Champion	Weight class	V	D	NC	L
13	(Brazil) Patrício Pitbull	Lightweight; Featherweight; Bantamweight	1; 12; 0	0; 0; 0	0; 0; 0	0; 3; 1
6	(United States) Michael Chandler	Lightweight	6	0	0	5
6	(United States) Ryan Bader	Heavyweight; Light Heavyweight	4; 2	0; 0	1; 0	0; 1
6	(Brazil) Cris Cyborg	Women's Featherweight	6	0	0	0
5	(Brazil) Eduardo Dantas	Bantamweight	5	0	0	2
5	(United States) Ilima-Lei Macfarlane	Women's Flyweight	5	0	0	2
5	(Netherlands) Gegard Mousasi	Middleweight	5	0	0	2
5	(United States) Ben Askren	Welterweight	5	0	0	0
5	(Russia) Vadim Nemkov	Light Heavyweight	5	0	1	0
4
4	(Brazil) Douglas Lima	Middleweight; Welterweight	0; 4	0; 0	0; 0	1; 4
4	(United States) Pat Curran	Lightweight; Featherweight	0; 4	0; 0	0; 0	1; 2
4	(Russia) Alexander Shlemenko	Middleweight	4	0	0	2
4	(Canada) Julia Budd	Women's Featherweight	4	0	0	1
4	(United States) Emanuel Newton	Light Heavyweight	4	0	0	1
4	(Brazil) Rafael Carvalho	Middleweight	4	0	0	1
4	(United States) Will Brooks	Lightweight	4	0	0	0
4	(United States) Liz Carmouche	Women's Flyweight	4	0	0	0
4	(United States) Johnny Eblen	Middleweight	4	0	0	0
4	(Russia) Usman Nurmagomedov	Lightweight	4	0	1	0

=== Most consecutive title defenses ===
The following includes all Bellator champions who were able to consecutively defend their title two times or more. Fighters with the same number of title defenses are listed chronologically.

Defenses	Champion	Weight class	Span	Days
5	(Brazil) Patrício Pitbull	Featherweight	Apr 21, 2017 – July 31, 2021	1562
5	(Brazil) Cris Cyborg	Women's Featherweight	Jan 25, 2020 – present	2475
4	(United States) Ben Askren	Welterweight	Oct 21, 2010 – July 31, 2013	1014
4	(United States) Ilima-Lei Macfarlane	Women's Flyweight	Nov 3, 2017 – Dec 10, 2020	1133
4	(Russia) Vadim Nemkov	Light Heavyweight	Aug 21, 2020 – Jan 17, 2024	1251
3	(Russia) Alexander Shlemenko	Middleweight	Feb 7, 2013 – Sep 26, 2014	596
3	(Brazil) Rafael Carvalho	Middleweight	Oct 23, 2015 – May 25, 2018	945
3	(Canada) Julia Budd	Women's Featherweight	Mar 3, 2017 – Jan 25, 2020	1058
3	(United States) Ryan Bader	Heavyweight	Jan 26, 2019 - present	2839
3	(United States) Liz Carmouche	Women's Flyweight	Apr 22, 2022 - present	1657
3	(United States) Johnny Eblen	Middleweight	Jun 24, 2022 - present	1594
3	(Russia) Usman Nurmagomedov	Lightweight	Nov 18, 2022 - present	1447

=== Multi-division champions ===
Fighters who have won championships in multiple weight classes. Tournament champions are not included.

Interim title

No.	Champion	Division	Won	Lost	Defenses	Reign	Total Reign
1	(United States) Joe Warren	Featherweight	Sep 2, 2010 (Bellator 27)	Mar 9, 2012 (Bellator 60)	0	554 days	723 days
1	(United States) Joe Warren	Bantamweight	May 2, 2014 (Bellator 118)	Oct 10, 2014 (Bellator 128)	0	–	723 days
1	(United States) Joe Warren	Bantamweight	Oct 10, 2014 (Bellator 128)	Mar 27, 2015 (Bellator 135)	0	169 days	723 days
2	(United States) Ryan Bader	Light Heavyweight	Jun 24, 2017 (Bellator 180)	Aug 21, 2020 (Bellator 244)	1	1154 days	3993 days
2	(United States) Ryan Bader	Heavyweight	Jan 26, 2019 (Bellator 214)	present	3	2839 days	3993 days
3	(Brazil) Patrício Pitbull	Featherweight	Sep 5, 2014 (Bellator 123)	Nov 6, 2015 (Bellator 145)	2	428 days	4533 days
3	(Brazil) Patrício Pitbull	Featherweight	Apr 21, 2017 (Bellator 178)	Jul 31, 2021 (Bellator 263)	5	1562 days	4533 days
3	(Brazil) Patrício Pitbull	Featherweight	Apr 15, 2022 (Bellator 277)	Apr 12, 2025 (Vacated)	2	1,093 days	4533 days
3	(Brazil) Patrício Pitbull	Lightweight	May 11, 2019 (Bellator 221)	Oct 6, 2021 (Vacated)	0	879 days	4533 days

=== Simultaneous two division champions ===
This table, different from the previous one, only counts the periods in which the fighter loaded the titles simultaneously and the defenses in that period of time.

No.	Champion	Division	Span	Defenses	Simultaneous Reign
1	(United States) Ryan Bader	Heavyweight	Jan 26, 2019 – Aug 21, 2020	0	573 days
1	(United States) Ryan Bader	Light Heavyweight	Jan 26, 2019 – Aug 21, 2020	1	573 days
2	(Brazil) Patrício Pitbull	Lightweight	May 11, 2019 – Jul 31, 2021	0	812 days
2	(Brazil) Patrício Pitbull	Featherweight	May 11, 2019 – Jul 31, 2021	3	812 days

== See also ==
- List of current Bellator fighters
- List of Bellator MMA alumni
- List of Bellator MMA events
- List of Bellator Kickboxing champions
- List of current mixed martial arts champions
- List of EliteXC champions
- List of Invicta FC champions
- List of ONE Championship champions
- List of Pride champions
- List of PFL champions
- List of Strikeforce champions
- List of UFC champions
- List of WEC champions
- Mixed martial arts weight classes
