= Bellator Champions Series 3 =

Mixed martial arts event in 2024

Bellator Champions Series 3: Jackson vs. Kuramagomedov
- The poster for Bellator Champions Series 3: Jackson vs. Kuramagomedov
- Promotion: Bellator MMA
- Date: June 22, 2024
- Venue: 3Arena
- City: Dublin, Ireland

Event chronology
Bellator Champions Series 2: Mix vs. Magomedov 2	Bellator Champions Series 3: Jackson vs. Kuramagomedov	Bellator Champions Series 4: Nurmagomedov vs. Shabliy

Bellator Champions Series 3: Jackson vs. Kuramagomedov (also known as Bellator Champions Series Dublin) was a mixed martial arts event produced by Bellator MMA, that took place on June 22, 2024, at the 3Arena in Dublin, Ireland.

== Background ==
The event marked the promotion's 11th visit to Dublin and first since Bellator 299 in September 2023.

A Bellator Welterweight World Championship bout between current champion (also former LFA Welterweight Champion) Jason Jackson and Ramazan Kuramagomedov headlined the event.

A bantamweight bout between Brian Moore and Francesco Nuzzi was scheduled for this event. However, Moore was forced to withdraw due to an undisclosed injury and was replaced by 2016 Olympic silver medalist in Greco-Roman wrestling Shinobu Ota. The week of the event, Nuzzi pulled out due to injury and was replaced by Roger Blanque.

A women's featherweight bout between Olena Kolesnyk and Sara Collins was cancelled when Kolesnyk withdrew due to injury.

== Fight card ==
Fight card (DAZN / MAX)
Weight class				Method	Round	Time	Notes
Welterweight	Ramazan Kuramagomedov	def.	Jason Jackson (c)	Decision (unanimous) (48–47, 48–47, 48–47)	5	5:00	(Note: For the Bellator Welterweight World Championship.)
Lightweight	Paul Hughes	def.	Bobby King	TKO (punches and elbows)	2	4:50
Women's Featherweight	Arlene Blencowe	def.	Sinead Kavanagh	Submission (guillotine choke)	2	3:02
Middleweight	Dalton Rosta	def.	Norbert Növényi Jr.	Decision (majority) (28–28, 29–28, 29–28)	3	5:00
Lightweight	Darragh Kelly	def.	Mathias Poiron	Technical Submission (guillotine choke)	1	1:29
Bantamweight	Kasum Kasumov	def.	Matheus Mattos	Decision (unanimous) (29–28, 30–27, 30–27)	3	5:00	(Note: Bellator Bantamweight title eliminator.)
Preliminary Card
Catchweight (148 lb)	Nathan Kelly	def.	Jose Sanchez	Submission (ninja choke)	1	3:42
Featherweight	Khasan Magomedsharipov	def.	Tyler Mathison	Decision (unanimous) (30–27, 30–27, 30–27)	3	5:00
Bantamweight	Sarvarjon Khamidov	def.	Marcirley Alves	Decision (unanimous) (30–27, 30–27, 30–27)	3	5:00
Bantamweight	Shinobu Ota	def.	Roger Blanque	Submission (north-south choke)	1	2:18
Women's Featherweight	Michelle Montague	def.	Karolina Sobek	Submission (rear-naked choke)	1	2:41
Amateur bout
Flyweight	Nate Kelly	def.	Paul Nolan	Submission (armbar)	1	1:49

== See also ==
- 2024 in Bellator MMA
- List of Bellator MMA events
- List of current Bellator fighters
