= Cris Cyborg =

Brazilian and American mixed martial artist and boxer (born 1985)

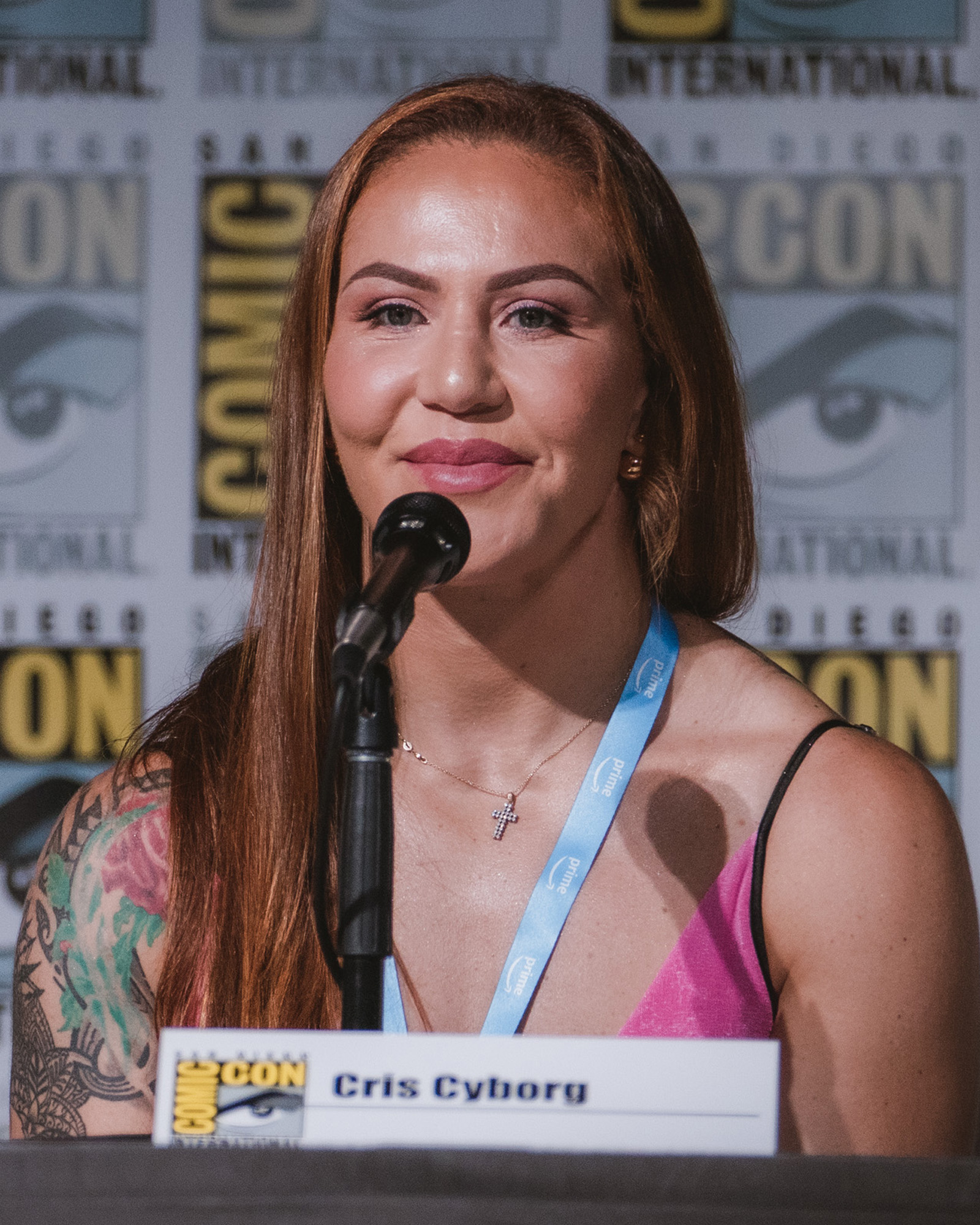
- Cyborg in 2023
- Born: Cristiane Justino Venâncio; July 9, 1985 (age 41); Curitiba, Paraná, Brazil
- Nickname: Cyborg
- Nationality: Brazilian; American
- Height: 5 ft 8 in (1.73 m)
- Weight: 155 lb (70 kg; 11 st 1 lb)
- Division: Featherweight (MMA) (2005-present); Bantamweight (MMA) (2016); Light middleweight (Boxing)
- Reach: 68 in (173 cm)
- Stance: Orthodox
- Fighting out of: San Diego, California, U.S.
- Team: Chute Boxe Academy; The Arena MMA; Atos Jiu-Jitsu; RVCA Training Center; Kings MMA
- Trainer: Rudimar Fedrigo
- Rank: Black Belt in Muay Thai under Rafael Cordeiro; Black belt in Brazilian Jiu-Jitsu under Rubens 'Cobrinha' Charles
- Years active: 2005–present

Professional boxing record
- Total: 7
- Wins: 7
- By knockout: 5

Kickboxing record
- Total: 3
- Wins: 2
- By knockout: 2
- Losses: 1

Mixed martial arts record
- Total: 33
- Wins: 30
- By knockout: 21
- By submission: 2
- By decision: 7
- Losses: 2
- By knockout: 1
- By submission: 1
- No contests: 1

Other information
- Website: criscyborg.com
- Mixed martial arts record from Sherdog
- Last updated on: March 27, 2014

Medal record

Representing Brazil

Women's Submission grappling

ADCC World Championship
Bronze medal – third place	2009 Barcelona	+60kg

Women's Brazilian jiu-jitsu

World Jiu-Jitsu Championship
Gold medal – first place	2012; Long Beach	+74kg (Purple belt)
Gold medal – first place	2011; Long Beach	+74kg (Purple belt)

Cristiane Justino Venâncio (born July 9, 1985), known professionally as Cris Cyborg and formerly by her married name Cristiane Santos, is a Brazilian-American professional mixed martial artist and professional boxer who currently competes in the Women’s Featherweight division of the Professional Fighters League (PFL), where she is the current and inaugural PFL Women's Featherweight World Champion. As a boxer, she is the current WIBA Light Middleweight World Champion. She formerly competed in Bellator MMA where she was the longest reigning and last Women's Featherweight World Champion. She is also a former UFC, Strikeforce and Invicta FC World Featherweight Champion. She is the only MMA fighter in history to become a Quintuple Champion, holding world championships across five major MMA promotions. Cyborg is widely regarded as one of the greatest female mixed martial artists of all time.

Cyborg first rose to prominence when she won the Strikeforce title on August 15, 2009, by defeating Gina Carano via first-round technical knock-out (TKO) in the first ever major main event to feature women. She holds the record for the most wins by a woman in MMA history and is the first and only female fighter to reach 30 career victories. She also holds the all-time record for the most knockout victories in women's MMA history, with 21.

== Early life ==
Cyborg was born on July 9, 1985, in Curitiba to Brazilian parents. A daughter of divorced parents and a father who had problems with alcoholism, Cyborg started her sports career at the age of twelve, playing handball at a national level in Brazil. Due to her success in the sport, she won numerous athletic scholarships on private universities after her high school graduation, and eventually chose to pursue the path of physical education in the capital of Paraná, Curitiba. Later, she planned to move to the city of Cascavel to become a professional handball player and finish her college studies there, before being discovered by Rudimar Fedrigo, a Chute Boxe Academy trainer who was impressed by her physical size and advised her to enter the world of fighting.

I was participating in a friendly handball tournament between men and women and one of the boys, called Jorginho, was a friend of Mestre Rafael and Mestre Rudimar. He saw me training handball and asked me if I liked fighting. I replied that I thought it was cool, but I had never done it. He invited me to take a Muay Thai class and I liked it!

— Cris Cyborg about the beginnings of her fighting career

== Mixed martial arts career ==
=== Early career ===
Justino, without yet incorporating the nickname "Cyborg", made her professional debut in mixed martial arts at the age of 19 on May 17, 2005, at Showfight 2 against multiple time world BJJ champion Erica Paes. Paes, who was five years her senior, was the first woman to train at the legendary Brazilian Top Team academy, a rival gym of the Chute Boxe gym where Cyborg trained. Cyborg lost the fight via submission in the first round, which remained her only professional loss in MMA until 2018, when she lost for the second time in her career against Amanda Nunes. Although the method of win for Paes was officially recorded as a submission due to a kneebar, Cyborg's team claims that she tapped out due to an elbow injury sustained after a fall in the fight.

After losing her MMA debut, Cyborg earned her first victory in the sport by defeating Vanessa Porto via unanimous decision. She subsequently won her next three fights in the Brazilian promotion Storm Samurai via first-round TKO finish, improving her record to 4-1.

She made her anticipated United States MMA debut on July 26, 2008, against Shayna Baszler at EliteXC: Unfinished Business. She won the fight by TKO in the second round.

She faced Yoko Takahashi on October 4, 2008, at EliteXC: Heat, winning the fight by unanimous decision.

She was scheduled to face Dutch submission specialist Marloes Coenen at XMMA 7 on February 27, 2009, but backed out of the fight after signing a new contract with Strikeforce. Cyborg earned a BJJ Purple Belt under her jiu-jitsu instructor Cristiano Marcello in 2009.

=== Strikeforce ===
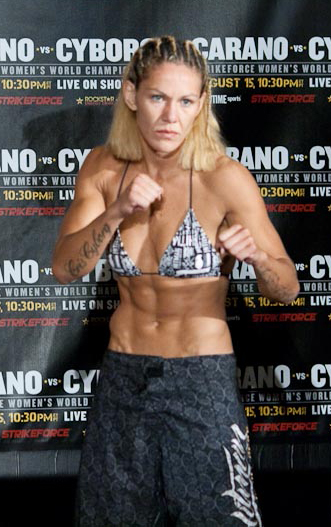
Cyborg in 2009

She later signed to fight for Strikeforce, which greatly increased the chance that a fight with Gina Carano would take place. In her Strikeforce debut, she faced Hitomi Akano on April 11, 2009, at Strikeforce: Shamrock vs. Diaz. Cyborg came in six pounds overweight for the fight. Akano originally rejected the fight due to Cyborg failing to make weight but later accepted the fight. She defeated Akano by TKO in the third round.

Before the fight with Carano, Cyborg was interviewed by mmaworldwide.com's reporter Aaron Tru. When asked how long it would take to submit Carano with a choke hold, she choked him.

She fought Gina Carano on August 15, 2009, at Strikeforce: Carano vs. Cyborg for the Women's Featherweight Championship. Cyborg won via TKO at 4:59 of the 5:00 first round. The card was the first time that a major promotion had featured a main event between women. After the match, she hugged Carano, and stated in her interview that she had the utmost respect for Carano, and that it was an honor to fight her.

She next defended her title against Dutch standout Marloes Coenen at a Strikeforce event on January 30, 2010. She won the fight via TKO at 3:40 of round 3.

Strikeforce CEO Scott Coker stated that the next challenger for Cyborg would most likely be Erin Toughill. However, Toughill later announced her intentions to leave Strikeforce and plans for the fight were cancelled.

On April 7, 2010, Coker stated that Cyborg would fight again in June. She faced Jan Finney at Strikeforce: Fedor vs. Werdum and won the fight via KO in the second round. Her contract with Strikeforce expired on June 26, 2011. She renewed her Strikeforce contract on August 25, 2011.

==== Doping violations and suspension ====
On September 23, 2011, Cyborg announced that she would return to the promotion to face Hiroko Yamanaka. The fight took place at Strikeforce: Melendez vs. Masvidal on December 17, 2011. She won via TKO just sixteen seconds into the first round, but later tested positive for stanozolol, an anabolic steroid. As a result of the banned substance, the fight's result was changed to a no contest. Cyborg had her license suspended for one year and was fined $2,500.

=== Invicta Fighting Championships ===
On February 15, 2013, a month after Strikeforce folded, Cyborg signed a multi-fight deal with Invicta Fighting Championships. She was scheduled to make her debut on April 5 at Invicta FC 5: Penne vs. Waterson against Ediane Gomes to determine who would move on to face Marloes Coenen. However, Gomes suffered an injury and Cyborg instead faced Fiona Muxlow. Cyborg was successful in her return, winning the bout via TKO in the first round.

Cyborg faced Marloes Coenen in a rematch for the inaugural Invicta FC Featherweight Championship at Invicta FC 6: Coenen vs. Cyborg on July 13, 2013. She defeated Coenen by TKO in the fourth round to become the first Invicta FC featherweight champion.

She returned to Muay Thai to face Jennifer Colomb at Lion Fight 11 in Las Vegas on September 20, 2013, defeating the previously undefeated Frenchwoman by TKO in round three. She had initially been set to fight Martina Jindrova but Jindrova withdrew with injury.

She lost a five-round unanimous decision against Jorina Baars in a fight for the inaugural Lion Fight Women's Welterweight Championship in the co-main event of Lion Fight 14 in Las Vegas, Nevada, United States on March 28, 2014. Baars officially knocked down Cyborg in the first round with a head kick and in the fifth round with a spinning heel kick, although referee Tony Weeks missed at least two other occasions throughout the fight where a knockdown could have been issued. Cyborg hit the canvas from a front kick in one occasion and from a knee on another, both times they were ruled slips by the referee.

In February 2015, Cyborg returned to MMA to defend her Invicta Featherweight title against Charmaine Tweet in the main event at Invicta FC 11. She successfully defended her title, winning the fight via TKO in just under a minute in the first round.

Cyborg faced Faith Van Duin on July 9, 2015, at Invicta FC 13: Cyborg vs. Van Duin. She won the fight by TKO in the first round due to a knee to the body and punches.

=== Ultimate Fighting Championship ===
In March 2015, Cyborg signed with UFC. Cyborg made her promotional debut at UFC 198 against Leslie Smith at a catchweight of 140 pounds. She won the fight by TKO in the first round.

Cyborg faced promotional newcomer Lina Länsberg in a catchweight (140 lb) bout on September 24, 2016, at UFC Fight Night 95. The referee stopped the fight midway through the second round after Länsberg could not effectively defend herself.

In December 2016 UFC was notified of a potential USADA doping violation by Cyborg. Cyborg's team immediately responded that it was in regards to a substance that helped her recover from her weight cut. On February 17, 2017, Cyborg was granted a retroactive therapeutic use exemption (TUE). Therefore, her suspension was lifted, and she was immediately eligible to compete.

In March 2017 Cyborg vacated her Invicta featherweight title and called out Germaine de Randamie for the belt targeting UFC 214 in Anaheim, California. The match fell apart since Germaine de Randamie refused to fight, stating that Cyborg was a proven drug cheater and she was willing to get stripped of the belt for not fighting Cyborg. De Randamie was stripped of her belt on June 19, 2017, by UFC and Cyborg was expected to face Megan Anderson to fight for the vacated UFC Women's Featherweight Championship at UFC 214 on July 29 in Anaheim, California. On June 27, Anderson pulled out of the fight for personal reasons and was replaced by current Invicta FC Bantamweight Champion Tonya Evinger. Cyborg won by TKO in the third round to claim her first UFC championship.

In the first defense of her title and the first fight of her new four-fight contract, Cyborg faced Holly Holm on December 30, 2017, in the main event at UFC 219. She won the fight via unanimous decision. This win also earned her her first Fight of the Night bonus.

Cyborg faced former Invicta bantamweight champion, Yana Kunitskaya, on March 3, 2018, at UFC 222 for her second featherweight title defense. Cyborg won the fight by TKO in the first round. After the win, she gave out 222 burgers to Los Angeles' homeless, as her way of celebration.

Cyborg faced the reigning UFC Women's bantamweight champion, Amanda Nunes, for the UFC Women's Featherweight Championship on December 29, 2018, at UFC 232. Nunes defeated Cyborg by knockout early in the first round, handing her the first knockout loss in her MMA career.

Cyborg faced Felicia Spencer on July 27, 2019, at UFC 240 in the co-main event. She won the fight via unanimous decision.

Following the fight against Spencer, which was the last fight on her contract, UFC president Dana White announced that the UFC would not negotiate a new contract with Cyborg, and they would waive her three-month exclusive negotiating period. This allowed her to immediately begin negotiations with other organizations.

=== Bellator MMA ===
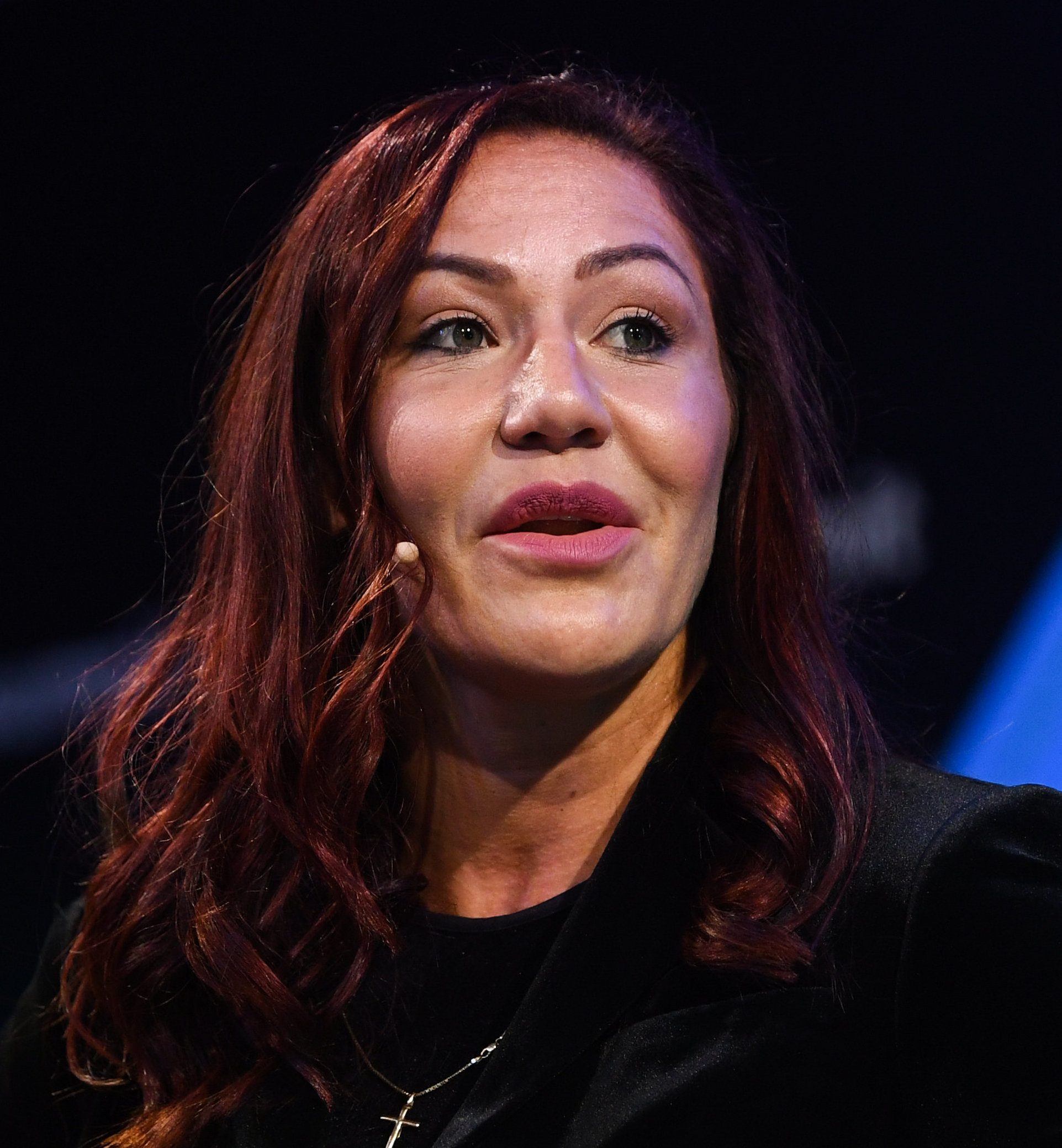
Cyborg at Web Summit 2019

On September 3, 2019, Bellator MMA president Scott Coker announced that Cyborg had signed a multi-fight deal with Bellator.

Cyborg faced Julia Budd for the Bellator Women's Featherweight Championship on Saturday, January 25, 2020, in Inglewood, California Bellator 238. She won the fight via technical knockout in round four.

For the fight with Budd, Cyborg trained in South Africa with trainers Richie Quan, Boyd Allen, and Martin Van Staden. Her and her team's goal for the camp was to train for well-roundedness and to be ready for anything.

After winning her fourth World Championship, Cyborg has stated she would like to make an attempt at a belt in boxing.

In the first defense of her title, Cyborg faced Arlene Blencowe at Bellator 249 on October 15, 2020. She won the bout via second round submission, earning the first submission of her MMA career.

Cyborg made her second defense of the title against Leslie Smith on May 21, 2021, in the main event at Bellator 259. They previously met at UFC 198, which was Cyborg's UFC debut, where she won by TKO in the first round. She won the bout via TKO after knocking Smith down and finished her with punches late in the last round.

Cyborg defended her title against Sinead Kavanagh on November 12, 2021, at Bellator 271. After exchanging on the feet, Cyborg knocked Kavanagh out early in the first round.

Cyborg defended her title in a rematch against Arlene Blencowe on April 23, 2022, at Bellator 279. She retained the title and won the bout via unanimous decision. The following summer Cyborg became a free agent.

After seventeen months away from MMA competition, Cyborg returned to defend her title against Cat Zingano on October 7, 2023 at Bellator 300. She won the fight via TKO in the first round.

=== Professional Fighters League ===
Cyborg faced 2023 PFL Women's Featherweight Champion and 2022 PFL Women's Lightweight Champion Larissa Pacheco for the PFL Super Fights Women's Featherweight Championship on October 19, 2024 at PFL Super Fights: Battle of the Giants. She won the fight by unanimous decision.

==== PFL Women's Featherweight Champion ====
Cyborg faced Sara Collins for the inaugural PFL Women's Featherweight Championship on December 13, 2025, at PFL Champions Series 4. She won the bout via a rear-naked choke submission in the third round.

In her first title defense, Cyborg defeated Ketlen Vieira by unanimous decision on August 22, 2026, at PFL Tampa.

== Boxing career ==
Cyborg made her professional boxing debut on September 25, 2022, facing Simone Silva, a former Brazilian National Boxing Champion, at Fight Music Show 2. Silva had suffered a knockout loss due to a body punch a month prior to the fight and was suspended by the Texas Department of Licensing and Regulation, however Simone Silva was required to complete additional medicals that allowed the Associaçáo Paranaense De Lutas Commission to sanction the bout as a professional fight. Cyborg won the bout via unanimous decision.

In her second bout on December 11, 2022, she fought Gabrielle Holloway as the co-main event under Terence Crawford vs. David Avanesyan at the CHI Health Center in Omaha, she dropped Holloway and outpointed her on to a unanimous decision victory. The event drew a paid attendance of 14,630 paid to set a state of Nebraska record for largest boxing gate.

On January 19, 2024, Cyborg knocked out Kelsey Wickstrum in the first round to earn her first victory by stoppage in the boxing ring. She then followed that performance up by defeating Aria Wild by second-round knockout on June 15, 2024.

After defeating Larissa Pacheco for the PFL Super Fights Women's Featherweight Championship on October 19, 2024, Cyborg made her return to the boxing ring on March 3, 2025, defeating Karen Fernandez by second-round knockout. Just 17 days later, she knocked out Valentina Angarita in the third round. On May 17, 2025, she earned her third consecutive knockout of the year and fifth overall, after stopping Precious Harris-McCray in the second round.

Cris Cyborg made combat sports history March 28, 2026 when she defeated Paulina Cardona by 3rd round TKO :02 to secure the WIBA World Super Welterweight World Championship The victory improved Cris Cyborg's record to 8-0 while competing in Boxing. Winning the WIBA World Title made her the first combat sports athlete to hold a major world championship belt in Boxing and MMA at the same time.

== Personal life ==
Cyborg was married to fellow mixed martial artist Evangelista "Cyborg" Santos, and adopted his nickname. The couple split in December 2011. She has been a naturalized U.S. citizen since 2016. Cyborg announced her engagement to longtime boyfriend, trainer, and former MMA athlete Ray Elbe in 2017.

In 2018, Cyborg legally adopted her teenage niece, making her historically the first mother to hold a UFC championship belt.

Cyborg works with Fight for the Forgotten, a non-profit organization organized by Justin Wren that digs wells to provide drinking water for the Batwa. After earning her first submission victory in a 26-fight MMA career, she was awarded her BJJ Black Belt by Rubens 'Cobrinha' Charles.

== Championships and accomplishments ==
=== Mixed martial arts ===
- Professional Fighters League
  - PFL Women's Featherweight Championship (One time, inaugural, current)
    - One successful title defense
  - PFL Super Fights Women's Featherweight Championship (One time, inaugural)
- Bellator MMA
  - Bellator MMA Women's Featherweight World Championship (One time, final)
    - Five successful title defenses
  - Tied (Arlene Blencowe) for most stoppage wins in Bellator Women's Featherweight division history (5)
  - Tied (Arlene Blencowe) for most knockout wins in Bellator Women's Featherweight division history (4)
- Ultimate Fighting Championship
  - UFC Women's Featherweight World Championship (One time)
    - Two successful title defenses
  - Fight of the Night (One time) vs. Holly Holm
  - Second most wins in UFC Women's Featherweight division history (4)
  - Tied (Megan Anderson and Felicia Spencer) for most knockouts in UFC Women's Featherweight division history (2)
  - UFC.com Awards
    - 2016 Half-Year Awards: Best Newcomer of the 1HY & Ranked #2 Newcomer of the Year
    - 2017: Ranked #5 Fighter of the Year
- Invicta Fighting Championships
  - Invicta FC Featherweight World Championship (One time; First)
    - Three successful title defenses
  - Performance of the Night (two times) vs. Charmaine Tweet and Faith Van Duin
- Strikeforce
  - Strikeforce Women's Featherweight World Championship (One time; First; Last; Only)
    - Two successful title defenses
  - 2010 Female Fighter of the Year
- MMA record
  - Most knockout victories in women's MMA history (21)
- The Athletic
  - 2010s Women's Featherweight Fighter of the Decade
- BJPenn.com
  - 2010s #10 Ranked Fighter of the Decade
- World MMA Awards
  - 2009 Female Fighter of the Year
  - 2010 Female Fighter of the Year
- Black Belt magazine
  - 2020 Woman of the Year
- Women's MMA Awards
  - 2013 Featherweight of the Year
  - 2011 Female Fan Favorite of the Year
  - 2010 Female Featherweight of the Year
  - 2009 Female Featherweight of the Year
  - 2009 Headline of the Year w/ Gina Carano in Strikeforce: Carano vs. Cyborg
- AwakeningFighters.com WMMA Awards
  - 2013 Featherweight of the Year
- Sherdog
  - 2010 Beatdown of the Year vs. Jan Finney on June 26
  - 2010 All-Violence Third Team
- Sports Illustrated
  - 2009 Female Fighter of the Year
- Inside MMA
  - 2009 Female Fighter of the Year Bazzie Award
- Fight Matrix
  - 2010 Female Fighter of the Year
  - 2017 Female Fighter of the Year
- MixedMartialArts.com
  - 2009 Female Fighter of the Year
- Examiner.com
  - 2009 Female Fighter of the Year
- MMADNA.nl
  - 2016 Debut of the Year.
- MMA Fighting
  - 2009 #4 Ranked Fighter of the Year
  - 2010s #9 Ranked Fighter of the Decade
  - 2024 Third Team MMA All-Star

=== Boxing ===
- Women's International Boxing Association
  - WIBA Light Middleweight World Championship (One time, current)
- Fight Music Show
  - FMS Women’s Super Welterweight Championship (One time)

=== Kickboxing ===
- AwakeningFighters.com Muay Thai Awards
  - 2014 Fight of the Year vs. Jorina Baars at Lion Fight 14

=== Submission grappling ===
- International Brazilian Jiu-Jitsu Federation
  - 2012 IBJJF World Jiu-Jitsu Championship Female Purple Belt Gold Medalist
  - 2011 IBJJF World Jiu-Jitsu Championship Female Purple Belt Gold Medalist
- Abu Dhabi Combat Club
  - 2009 ADCC Submission Wrestling World Championship Bronze Medalist

=== Amateur wrestling ===
- Federação Paulista de Luta Olímpica
  - 2007 Brazil Cup International Senior Women's Freestyle Gold Medalist
- Federação Paranaense de Lutas Associadas
  - Paraná Senior Women's Freestyle State Championship (2007)

== Mixed martial arts record ==
Professional record breakdown
33 matches	30 wins	2 losses
By knockout	21	1
By submission	2	1
By decision	7	0
No contests	1	

Res.	Record	Opponent	Method	Event	Date	Round	Time	Location	Notes
Win	30–2 (1)	Ketlen Vieira	Decision (unanimous)	PFL Tampa: Cyborg vs. Vieira	August 22, 2026	5	5:00	Tampa, Florida, United States	Non-title bout; Vieira missed weight (152.2 lb).
Win	29–2 (1)	Sara Collins	Submission (face crank)	PFL Lyon: Nemkov vs. Ferreira	December 13, 2025	3	2:55	Décines-Charpieu, France	Won the inaugural PFL Women's Featherweight Championship.
Win	28–2 (1)	Larissa Pacheco	Decision (unanimous)	PFL Super Fights: Battle of the Giants	October 19, 2024	5	5:00	Riyadh, Saudi Arabia	Won the symbolic PFL Super Fights Women's Featherweight Championship.
Win	27–2 (1)	Cat Zingano	TKO (punches)	Bellator 300	October 7, 2023	1	4:01	San Diego, California, United States	Defended the Bellator Women's Featherweight World Championship.
Win	26–2 (1)	Arlene Blencowe	Decision (unanimous)	Bellator 279	April 23, 2022	5	5:00	Honolulu, Hawaii, United States	Defended the Bellator Women's Featherweight World Championship. Cyborg was deducted one point in round 1 due to an illegal knee.
Win	25–2 (1)	Sinead Kavanagh	KO (punches)	Bellator 271	November 12, 2021	1	1:32	Hollywood, Florida, United States	Defended the Bellator Women's Featherweight World Championship.
Win	24–2 (1)	Leslie Smith	TKO (punches)	Bellator 259	May 21, 2021	5	4:51	Uncasville, Connecticut, United States	Defended the Bellator Women's Featherweight World Championship.
Win	23–2 (1)	Arlene Blencowe	Submission (rear-naked choke)	Bellator 249	October 15, 2020	2	2:36	Uncasville, Connecticut, United States	Defended the Bellator Women's Featherweight World Championship.
Win	22–2 (1)	Julia Budd	TKO (punches)	Bellator 238	January 25, 2020	4	1:14	Inglewood, California, United States	Won the Bellator Women's Featherweight World Championship.
Win	21–2 (1)	Felicia Spencer	Decision (unanimous)	UFC 240	July 27, 2019	3	5:00	Edmonton, Alberta, Canada	
Loss	20–2 (1)	Amanda Nunes	KO (punch)	UFC 232	December 29, 2018	1	0:51	Inglewood, California, United States	Lost the UFC Women's Featherweight Championship.
Win	20–1 (1)	Yana Kunitskaya	TKO (punches)	UFC 222	March 3, 2018	1	3:25	Las Vegas, Nevada, United States	Defended the UFC Women's Featherweight Championship.
Win	19–1 (1)	Holly Holm	Decision (unanimous)	UFC 219	December 30, 2017	5	5:00	Las Vegas, Nevada, United States	Defended the UFC Women's Featherweight Championship. Fight of the Night.
Win	18–1 (1)	Tonya Evinger	TKO (knees)	UFC 214	July 29, 2017	3	1:56	Anaheim, California, United States	Won the vacant UFC Women's Featherweight Championship.
Win	17–1 (1)	Lina Länsberg	TKO (punches)	UFC Fight Night: Cyborg vs. Länsberg	September 24, 2016	2	2:29	Brasília, Brazil	Catchweight (140 lb) bout.
Win	16–1 (1)	Leslie Smith	TKO (punches)	UFC 198	May 14, 2016	1	1:21	Curitiba, Brazil	Catchweight (140 lb) bout.
Win	15–1 (1)	Daria Ibragimova	KO (punches)	Invicta FC 15	January 16, 2016	1	4:58	Costa Mesa, California, United States	Defended the Invicta FC Featherweight Championship. Cyborg vacated the title on March 24, 2017.
Win	14–1 (1)	Faith van Duin	TKO (knee to the body and punches)	Invicta FC 13	July 9, 2015	1	0:45	Las Vegas, Nevada, United States	Defended the Invicta FC Featherweight Championship. Performance of the Night.
Win	13–1 (1)	Charmaine Tweet	TKO (punches)	Invicta FC 11	February 27, 2015	1	0:46	Los Angeles, California, United States	Defended the Invicta FC Featherweight Championship. Performance of the Night.
Win	12–1 (1)	Marloes Coenen	TKO (punches and elbows)	Invicta FC 6	July 13, 2013	4	4:10	Kansas City, Missouri, United States	Won the inaugural Invicta FC Featherweight Championship.
Win	11–1 (1)	Fiona Muxlow	TKO (knees and punches)	Invicta FC 5	April 5, 2013	1	3:46	Kansas City, Missouri, United States	Invicta FC Featherweight title eliminator.
NC	10–1 (1)	Hiroko Yamanaka	NC (overturned)	Strikeforce: Melendez vs. Masvidal	December 17, 2011	1	0:16	San Diego, California, United States	For the Strikeforce Women's Featherweight Championship. Originally a TKO (punches) win for Cyborg; overturned and stripped of the title on January 6, 2012 after she tested positive for stanozolol.
Win	10–1	Jan Finney	KO (knee to the body)	Strikeforce: Fedor vs. Werdum	June 26, 2010	2	2:56	San Jose, California, United States	Defended the Strikeforce Women's Featherweight Championship.
Win	9–1	Marloes Coenen	TKO (punches)	Strikeforce: Miami	January 30, 2010	3	3:40	Sunrise, Florida, United States	Defended the Strikeforce Women's Featherweight Championship.
Win	8–1	Gina Carano	TKO (punches)	Strikeforce: Carano vs. Cyborg	August 15, 2009	1	4:59	San Jose, California, United States	Won the inaugural Strikeforce Women's Featherweight Championship.
Win	7–1	Hitomi Akano	TKO (punches)	Strikeforce: Shamrock vs. Diaz	April 11, 2009	3	0:35	San Jose, California, United States	Catchweight (150 lb) bout; Cyborg missed weight.
Win	6–1	Yoko Takahashi	Decision (unanimous)	EliteXC: Heat	October 4, 2008	3	3:00	Sunrise, Florida, United States	Catchweight (150 lb) bout.
Win	5–1	Shayna Baszler	TKO (punches)	EliteXC: Unfinished Business	July 26, 2008	2	2:48	Stockton, California, United States	Catchweight (140 lb) bout.
Win	4–1	Marise Vitoria	TKO (stomps)	Storm Samurai 12	November 25, 2006	1	1:27	Curitiba, Brazil	
Win	3–1	Elaine Santiago de Lima	TKO (corner stoppage)	Storm Samurai 11	May 21, 2006	1	2:46	Curitiba, Brazil	
Win	2–1	Chris Schroeder	TKO (punches)	Storm Samurai 10	January 28, 2006	1	N/A	Curitiba, Brazil	
Win	1–1	Vanessa Porto	Decision (unanimous)	Storm Samurai 9	November 20, 2005	3	5:00	Curitiba, Brazil	
Loss	0–1	Erica Paes	Submission (kneebar)	Show Fight 2	May 17, 2005	1	1:46	São Paulo, Brazil	Featherweight debut.

== Professional boxing record ==
7 fights	7 wins	0 losses
By knockout	5	0
By decision	2	0

No.	Result	Record	Opponent	Type	Round, time	Date	Location	Notes
7	Win	7–0	(Colombia) Paulina Cardona	RTD	2 (10), 2:00	March 28, 2026	Espaço Winners, Parana, Brazil	Won vacant WIBA light middleweight world title.
6	Win	6–0	(United States) Precious Harris-McCray	TKO	2 (6), 1:57	May 17, 2025	(United States) Tech CU Arena, San Jose, California, U.S.	
5	Win	5–0	(Colombia) Valentina Angarita	KO	3 (4), 1:36	March 20, 2025	Round a Round Fitness Club, Santa Marta, Colombia	
4	Win	4–0	(Colombia) Karen Fernandez	KO	2 (4), 1:16	March 3, 2025	Round a Round Fitness Club, Santa Marta, Colombia	
3	Win	3–0	(United States) Kelsey Wickstrum	KO	1 (6), 1:21	January 19, 2024	(United States) Pechanga Resort & Casino, Temecula, California, U.S.	
2	Win	2–0	(United States) Gabrielle Holloway	UD	4	December 10, 2022	(United States) CHI Health Center, Omaha, Nebraska, U.S.	
1	Win	1–0	(Brazil) Simone da Silva	UD	8	September 25, 2022	Arena da Baixada, Curitiba, Parana, Brazil	Won FMS super welterweight title. Pro Bout sanctioned under Associação Paranaense de Lutas Commission.

== Exhibition boxing record ==
1 fight	1 win	0 losses
By knockout	1	0

No.	Result	Record	Opponent	Type	Round, time	Date	Location	Notes
1	Win	1–0	(United Kingdom) Aria Wild	TKO	2 (4), 1:01	June 15, 2024	(United Kingdom) Indigo at The O2, London, England, U.K.	

== Kickboxing record ==
2 Wins (2 (T)KO's), 1 Loss (1 Decision), 0 Draws
Result	Record	Opponent	Method	Event	Date	Round	Time	Location
Loss	2–1	(Netherlands) Jorina Baars	UD	Lion Fight 14	March 28, 2014	5	3:00	(United States) Las Vegas, Nevada
For inaugural Lion Fight Muay Thai Women's World Welterweight Championship.
Win	2–0	(France) Jennifer Colomb	TKO	Lion Fight 11	September 20, 2013	3	0:54	(United States) Las Vegas, Nevada
Win	1–0	(Brazil) Edna Gloria	KO	Estimulo de Muay Thai	October 21, 2006	1	1:30	(Brazil) Curitiba, Paraná
Legend Win Loss Draw/No contest Notes

== Grappling record ==
8 Matches, 7 Wins (1 Submission), 1 Loss
Result	Rec	Opponent	Method	Event	Division	Type	Date	Location
Win	7–1	(Finland) Venla Luukkonen	Points (11–0)	IBJJF World Championships (purple belt)	+74 kg	Gi	June 1, 2012	(United States) Long Beach, CA
Win	6–1	(United States) Hillary van Ornum	Points (4–0)	IBJJF World Championships (purple belt)	+74 kg	Gi	June 1, 2012	(United States) Long Beach, CA
Win	5–1	(United States) Maia Matalon	Submission (armbar)	IBJJF World Championships (purple belt)	+74 kg	Gi	June 1, 2012	(United States) Long Beach, CA
Win	4–1	(United States) Amanda Lucas	Points (8–0)	IBJJF World Championships (purple belt)	+74 kg	Gi	June 3, 2011	(United States) Long Beach, CA
Win	3–1	(Canada) Sarah Draht	Points (16–0)	IBJJF World Championships (purple belt)	+74 kg	Gi	June 3, 2011	(United States) Long Beach, CA
Win	2–1	(Brazil) Rosângela Conceição	Referee Decision	ADCC World Championships	+60 kg	Nogi	September 27, 2009	(Spain) Barcelona
Loss	1–1	(South Africa) Penny Thomas	Negative Points (-2 -1)	ADCC World Championships	+60 kg	Nogi	September 27, 2009	(Spain) Barcelona
Win	1–0	(Sweden) Ida Hansson	Points (10–0)	ADCC World Championships	+60 kg	Nogi	September 26, 2009	(Spain) Barcelona

== Pay-per-view bouts ==
No.	Event	Fight	Date	Venue	City	PPV Buys
1.	UFC 219	Cyborg vs. Holm	December 30, 2017	T-Mobile Arena	Las Vegas, Nevada, United States	380,000
2.	UFC 222	Cyborg vs. Kunitskaya	March 3, 2018	T-Mobile Arena	Las Vegas, Nevada, United States	260,000
3.	Bellator 238	Budd vs. Cyborg	January 25, 2020	The Forum	Inglewood, California, United States	Not disclosed
4.	Bellator 249	Cyborg vs. Blencowe	October 15, 2020	Mohegan Sun Arena	Uncasville, Connecticut, United States	Not disclosed
5.	Bellator 259	Cyborg vs. Smith 2	May 21, 2021	Mohegan Sun Arena	Uncasville, Connecticut, United States	Not disclosed
6.	Bellator 271	Cyborg vs. Kavanagh	November 12, 2021	Seminole Hard Rock Hotel & Casino Hollywood	Hollywood, Florida, United States	Not disclosed
7.	Bellator 279	Cyborg vs. Blencowe 2	April 23, 2022	Neal S. Blaisdell Arena	Honolulu, Hawaii, United States	Not disclosed

== See also ==
- List of current Bellator fighters
- List of current mixed martial arts champions
- List of female boxers
- List of female kickboxers
- List of female mixed martial artists
- List of mixed martial artists with professional boxing records
- List of multi-sport athletes
- List of multi-sport champions
- List of prizefighters with professional boxing and kickboxing records

Achievements
New championship	1st Strikeforce Featherweight Champion; August 15, 2009 – January 6, 2012; Stripped	Title defunct
New championship	1st Invicta FC Featherweight Champion; July 13, 2013 – March 24, 2017; Vacated	Succeeded by Megan Anderson
Vacant Title last held by Germaine de Randamie	2nd UFC Featherweight Champion; July 29, 2017 – December 29, 2018	Succeeded by Amanda Nunes
Preceded by Julia Budd	2nd Bellator Featherweight Champion; January 25, 2020 – present	Title defunct
New championship	1st PFL Super Fights Featherweight Champion; October 19, 2024 – present	Incumbent
New championship	1st PFL Women's Featherweight Champion; December 13, 2025 – present	Incumbent
Awards
Preceded by Gina Carano	World MMA Female Fighter of the Year; 2009, 2010	Succeeded by Miesha Tate
Records
New record	Only Quintuple Champion in MMA; October 19, 2024 – present	Incumbent
