= Janay Harding =

New Zealand mixed martial arts fighter

- Born: Janay Tiana Harding; September 28, 1994 (age 32); Christchurch, New Zealand
- Other names: Hollowpoint
- Nationality: New Zealander
- Height: 5 ft 10 in (1.78 m)
- Weight: 145 lb (66 kg; 10 st 5 lb)
- Division: Featherweight
- Reach: 70.0 in (178 cm)
- Style: Karate
- Fighting out of: Sydney
- Years active: 2014–present

Mixed martial arts record
- Total: 14
- Wins: 6
- By knockout: 4
- By decision: 2
- Losses: 8
- By knockout: 2
- By submission: 1
- By decision: 5

Other information
- Mixed martial arts record from Sherdog

Janay Tiana Harding (born September 28, 1994) is a New Zealand mixed martial artist who competes in the Featherweight division. She is most notable for her time in Bellator MMA.

== Background ==
Harding was born in Christchurch, New Zealand but moved to Australia's Gold Coast at the age of ten when her father, Geoffrey Charlton, died. Starting martial arts at a young age, Harding earned a black belt in karate at the age of 14.

== Mixed martial arts career ==
=== Early career ===
Harding started her professional MMA career in 2014, compiled a 3–2 record, though the two losses on her professional record came against current UFC fighter Jessica-Rose Clark and previous Bellator title challenger Arlene Blencowe, while also losing to Megan Anderson in an amateur bout. Harding made her international debut in May 2017, travelling to Hong Kong where she secured a second round stoppage over Ramona Pascual.

=== Bellator MMA ===
Signing with Bellator MMA in December 2017, Harding made her promotional debut against Amber Leibrock at Bellator 199 on May 12, 2018. She lost the bout via unanimous decision.

Harding faced Sinead Kavanagh at Bellator 207 on October 12, 2018. She won the bout after it was stopped due to a cut.

Harding faced Marina Mokhnatkina on March 29, 2019 at Bellator 219. She won the bout via unanimous decision.

Harding faced Amanda Bell at Bellator 233 on November 8, 2019. She lost the fight via third-round knockout.

Harding faced Jessy Miele at Bellator 251 on November 5, 2020. She won the bout via unanimous decision.

Harding faced Leah McCourt on May 21, 2021 at Bellator 259. At the weigh-ins, McCourt weighed in at 149.4 pounds, three and a half pounds over the featherweight non-title fight limit. The bout proceeded at catchweight and McCourt was fined a percentage of her purse, which went to Harding. After looking dominant in the second round with her striking, Harding was caught with an upkick while trying to pass McCourt's guard and fell into a triangle choke, losing the bout via submission.

Harding faced Dayana Silva on April 23, 2022 at Bellator 279. She lost the bout via unanimous decision.

Harding faced Sinead Kavanagh in a rematch on February 25, 2023 at Bellator 291. She lost the fight by unanimous decision.

== Boxing ==
Harding faced Tayla Harris for the vacant Australian female super-welterweight title at The Melbourne Pavilion on November 22, 2019. She lost the bout via TKO in the 4th round.

== Mixed martial arts record ==
Professional record breakdown
14 matches	6 wins	8 losses
By knockout	4	2
By submission	0	1
By decision	2	5

Res.	Record	Opponent	Method	Event	Date	Round	Time	Location	Notes
Loss	6–8	Jamie Edenden	Decision (unanimous)	Beatdown Promotions 5	September 16, 2023	3	5:00	Eatons Hill, Queensland, Australia	
Loss	6–7	Sinead Kavanagh	Decision (unanimous)	Bellator 291	February 25, 2023	3	5:00	Dublin, Ireland	
Loss	6–6	Dayana Silva	Decision (unanimous)	Bellator 279	April 23, 2022	3	5:00	Honolulu, Hawaii, United States	
Loss	6–5	Leah McCourt	Submission (triangle choke)	Bellator 259	May 21, 2021	2	2:42	Uncasville, Connecticut, United States	Catchweight (149.4 lb) bout; McCourt missed weight.
Win	6–4	Jessy Miele	Decision (unanimous)	Bellator 251	November 5, 2020	3	5:00	Uncasville, Connecticut, United States	
Loss	5–4	Amanda Bell	TKO (punches)	Bellator 233	November 8, 2019	3	4:44	Thackerville, Oklahoma, United States	
Win	5–3	Marina Mokhnatkina	Decision (unanimous)	Bellator 219	March 29, 2019	3	5:00	Temecula, California, United States	
Win	4–3	Sinead Kavanagh	TKO (cut)	Bellator 207	October 12, 2018	1	5:00	Uncasville, Connecticut, United States	
Loss	3–3	Amber Leibrock	Decision (unanimous)	Bellator 199	May 12, 2018	3	5:00	San Jose, California	
Win	3–2	Ramona Pascual	TKO (elbows and punches)	Fight Factory Gym: E-1 World Championship	May 31, 2017	2	1:43	Hong Kong	
Loss	2–2	Arlene Blencowe	KO (punches)	Legend MMA 1	January 28, 2017	1	1:08	Gold Coast, Queensland Australia	
Loss	2–1	Jessica-Rose Clark	Decision (unanimous)	Eternal MMA 19	July 30, 2016	3	5:00	Gold Coast, Queensland, Australia	
Win	2–0	Jess Doueihi	TKO (punches)	Brace 36	September 19, 2015	1	1:26	Sydney, Australia	
Win	1–0	Helen Malone	TKO (punches)	Eternal MMA 5	May 3, 2014	1	1:59	Gold Coast, Queensland, Australia	

== See also ==
- List of female mixed martial artists
