= Sinead Kavanagh =

Irish mixed martial arts fighter

- Born: February 1, 1986 (age 40); Inchicore, Dublin, Ireland
- Other names: KO
- Nationality: Irish
- Height: 5 ft 5 in (1.65 m)
- Weight: 145 lb (66 kg; 10 st 5 lb)
- Division: Featherweight
- Reach: 65.0 in (165 cm)
- Fighting out of: Dublin, Ireland
- Team: Straight Blast Gym Ireland
- Years active: 2015–present

Mixed martial arts record
- Total: 16
- Wins: 9
- By knockout: 4
- By decision: 5
- Losses: 7
- By knockout: 2
- By submission: 1
- By decision: 4

Other information
- Mixed martial arts record from Sherdog

Sinead Kavanagh (born February 1, 1986) is an Irish female mixed martial artist who competed in the Featherweight division of the Bellator MMA. Fight Matrix had her ranked at #10 in Women's Featherweight from April 2021 till July 2021, and March 2022.

== Background ==
Kavanagh is the middle child in a family of five siblings. She was a tomboy growing up. At eight years old, she started training stand-up disciplines including karate, boxing and kickboxing. She continued in these for many years, and had a desire to pursue martial arts further.

While still in high school, Kavanagh gave birth to her son Leon, however Leon's father died. She had a tough upbringing, with her mother forming a drinking habit after her brother and sister were killed in a car crash, and becoming homeless at a young age.

Kavanagh became a five-time national boxing champion, and competed alongside Katie Taylor on the Irish team that went to the World Championships in 2012. But after losing multiple fights, she decided to quit the sport.

== Mixed martial arts career ==
=== Early career ===
In 2015, Kavanagh made it to the finals of the International Mixed Martial Arts Federation (IMMAF) World Championships, losing to Canadian fighter Jamie Herrington when the referee jumped in and stopped the fight in the third round. Afterwards, Herrington contacted her on Facebook to admit that she had failed a drug test and offered her apologies.

Kavanagh made her professional MMA debut against Hatice Özyurt at BAMMA 22: Duquesnoy vs. Loughnane on 19 September 2015, defeating Ozyurt via TKO 17 seconds into the bout.

Next up was future UFC fighter Zarah Fairn at BAMMA 24: Ireland vs. England on 26 February 2016. She won the close bout via split decision.

From there, Kavanagh secured her third consecutive win against Polish fighter Katarzyna Sadura BAMMA 26: Saadeh vs. Young, which she won via KO in the first round.

She was rewarded by being signed to Bellator MMA before their show in Dublin towards the end of 2016 and has been with the promotion ever since.

=== Bellator MMA ===
Kavanagh made her Bellator debut against Elina Kallionidou at Bellator 169 on 16 December 2016; she won the bout by unanimous decision. She faced Iony Razafiarison on 24 February 2017 at Bellator 173, losing by unanimous decision. Kavanagh returned to face former Australian boxing champ Arlene Blencowe on 25 August 2017 at Bellator 182. She lost the fight via split decision. She later defeated Maria Casanova via TKO at Bellator 187 on 10 November 2017.

Kavanagh faced Janay Harding at Bellator 207 on 12 October 2018. She lost the bout after it was stopped due to a cut. She was scheduled to face Olga Rubin at Bellator 217, however, she pulled out of the bout due to injury. She faced Leslie Smith in her promotional debut at Bellator 224 on 12 July 2019. She lost the fight by majority decision. The bout against Olga Rubin was rebooked for Bellator 234 on 15 November 2019. She won the bout via TKO in the second round.

Kavanagh won a bout with Katharina Lehner at Bellator Milan 3 on 3 October 2020, by unanimous decision.

Kavanagh fought for the Bellator Women's Featherweight Championship against Cris Cyborg on 12 November 2021 at Bellator 271. After exchanging on the feet, Kavanagh was knocked out early in the first round.

Kavanagh faced Leah McCourt on 25 February 2022 at Bellator 275. Even though she injured her knee during the bout, Kavanagh won the bout via unanimous decision.

Kavanagh faced Janay Harding in a rematch on 25 February 2023 at Bellator 291. She won the fight by unanimous decision.

Kavanagh faced Sara Collins on 23 September 2023 at Bellator 299. She lost the fight via split decision.

Kavanagh was scheduled to rematch Leah McCourt on 22 March 2024 at Bellator Champions Series 1. On 20 February, McCourt announced that she was out of the bout due to broken ribs and a torn oblique.

Kavanagh faced Arlene Blencowe in a rematch on 22 June 2024 at Bellator Champions Series 3 and lost the bout by a guillotine choke submission.

== Mixed martial arts record ==
Professional record breakdown
16 matches	9 wins	7 losses
By knockout	4	2
By submission	0	1
By decision	5	4

Res.	Record	Opponent	Method	Event	Date	Round	Time	Location	Notes
Loss	9–7	Arlene Blencowe	Submission (guillotine choke)	Bellator Champions Series 3	22 June 2024	2	3:02	Dublin, Ireland	
Loss	9–6	Sara Collins	Decision (split)	Bellator 299	23 September 2023	3	5:00	Dublin, Ireland	
Win	9–5	Janay Harding	Decision (unanimous)	Bellator 291	25 February 2023	3	5:00	Dublin, Ireland	
Win	8–5	Leah McCourt	Decision (unanimous)	Bellator 275	25 February 2022	3	5:00	Dublin, Ireland	
Loss	7–5	Cris Cyborg	KO (punches)	Bellator 271	12 November 2021	1	1:32	Hollywood, Florida, United States	For the Bellator Women's Featherweight World Championship.
Win	7–4	Katharina Lehner	Decision (unanimous)	Bellator Milan 3	3 October 2020	3	5:00	Milan, Italy	
Win	6–4	Olga Rubin	TKO (punches)	Bellator 234	15 November 2019	2	4:37	Tel Aviv, Israel	
Loss	5–4	Leslie Smith	Decision (majority)	Bellator 224	12 July 2019	3	5:00	Thackerville, Oklahoma, United States	Catchweight (147.7 lb) bout; Kavanagh missed weight.
Loss	5–3	Janay Harding	TKO (cut)	Bellator 207	October 12, 2018	1	5:00	Uncasville, Connecticut, United States	
Win	5–2	Maria Casanova	TKO (punches)	Bellator 187	10 November 2017	1	0:34	Dublin, Ireland	Catchweight (143 lb) bout.
Loss	4–2	Arlene Blencowe	Decision (split)	Bellator 182	25 August 2017	3	5:00	Verona, New York, United States	Return to Featherweight.
Loss	4–1	Iony Razafiarison	Decision (unanimous)	Bellator 173	24 February 2017	3	5:00	Belfast, Northern Ireland	Catchweight (140 lb) bout.
Win	4–0	Elina Kallionidou	Decision (unanimous)	Bellator 169	16 December 2016	3	5:00	Dublin, Ireland	
Win	3–0	Katarzyna Sadura	KO (punches)	BAMMA 26: Saadeh vs. Young	10 September 2016	1	2:46	Dublin, Ireland	
Win	2–0	Zarah Fairn	Decision (split)	BAMMA 24: Ireland vs. England	26 February 2016	3	5:00	Dublin, Ireland	Featherweight bout.
Win	1–0	Hatice Özyurt	TKO (punches)	BAMMA 22: Duquesnoy vs. Loughnane	19 September 2015	1	0:17	Dublin, Ireland	Bantamweight debut.

== See also ==
- List of female mixed martial artists
