= Amanda Bell =

American mixed martial arts fighter

- Born: August 3, 1988 (age 38); Oakland, California, U.S.
- Other names: The Lady Killer
- Height: 5 ft 8 in (1.73 m)
- Weight: 145 lb (66 kg; 10.4 st)
- Division: Featherweight
- Reach: 72 in (183 cm)
- Style: Karate
- Team: Animals MMA; Fabian's MMA; Lotus Club BJJ; Warrior Camp MMA (2019–present)
- Years active: 2013–present

Mixed martial arts record
- Total: 15
- Wins: 7
- By knockout: 5
- By submission: 1
- By decision: 1
- Losses: 8
- By knockout: 2
- By submission: 3
- By decision: 3

Other information
- Mixed martial arts record from Sherdog

Amanda Bell (born August 3, 1988) is an American mixed martial artist who competes in the Featherweight division. She previously competed in the Bellator MMA and Invicta FC.

== Mixed martial arts career ==
=== Early career ===
A well rounded athlete, Bell currently holds a blue belt in Brazilian Jiu-Jitsu, and has a background in Karate, Aikido, Hung Gar and Tai Chi. Bell began her amateur MMA career in 2008. She earned six wins against one loss over the next three years.

=== Invicta FC ===
Bell made her professional MMA debut in January 2013 at Invicta FC 4: Esparza vs. Hyatt. She lost her debut against Tamikka Brents by unanimous decision. After going 2-1 in regional promotions, she returned to Invicta FC on November 1, 2014 at Invicta FC 9: Honchak vs. Hashi. She defeated Maria Hougaard Djursaa by TKO in the first round. In her third fight for the promotion, Bell faced Faith Van Duin on April 24, 2015 at Invicta FC 12: Kankaanpää vs. Souza. She lost the fight via submission in the second round. In her fourth fight for the promotion, Bell faced Megan Anderson on May 7, 2016 at Invicta FC 17: Evinger vs. Schneider. She lost the bout via TKO in the first round.

=== Bellator MMA ===
In 2017, Bell made her Bellator MMA debut against Brittney Elkin at Bellator 181 on July 14, 2017. She won the fight via TKO in the second round.

Bell faced Talita Nogueira at Bellator 182 on August 25, 2017. She lost the fight via a rear-naked choke submission in the first round.

A year removed from her previous fight, Bell returned to action against Amber Leibrock at Bellator 215 on February 15, 2019. She won the fight via technical knockout in the first round.

Next she faced Arlene Blencowe at Bellator 224 on July 12, 2019. She lost the fight via first-minute knockout.

She faced Janay Harding at Bellator 233 on November 8, 2019. She won the fight via third-round knockout.

Bell faced Leslie Smith at Bellator 245 on September 11, 2020. She missed weight and lost the fight via unanimous decision. Subsequently, she signed a new multi-fight contract with the organization.

Bell faced Marina Mokhnatkina on June 11, 2021 at Bellator 260. She lost the bout via unanimous decision.

On July 10, 2021, it was announced that she was no longer under contract with Bellator.

== Championships and accomplishments ==
- Absolute Action MMA
  - 2011 Absolute Action MMA Amateur featherweight title
- AwakeningFighters.com
  - 2014 Featherweight of the Year

== Mixed martial arts record ==
Professional record breakdown
15 matches	7 wins	8 losses
By knockout	5	2
By submission	1	3
By decision	1	3

Res.	Record	Opponent	Method	Event	Date	Round	Time	Location	Notes
Loss	7–8	Marina Mokhnatkina	Decision (unanimous)	Bellator 260	June 11, 2021	3	5:00	Uncasville, Connecticut, United States	
Loss	7–7	Leslie Smith	Decision (unanimous)	Bellator 245	September 11, 2020	3	5:00	Uncasville, Connecticut, United States	Catchweight (149 lbs) bout; Bell missed weight.
Win	7–6	Janay Harding	TKO (punches)	Bellator 233	November 8, 2019	3	4:44	Thackerville, Oklahoma, United States	
Loss	6–6	Arlene Blencowe	KO (punches)	Bellator 224	July 12, 2019	1	0:22	Thackerville, Oklahoma, United States	
Win	6–5	Amber Leibrock	TKO (punches)	Bellator 215	February 15, 2019	1	3:52	Uncasville, Connecticut, United States	
Loss	5–5	Talita Nogueira	Submission (rear-naked choke)	Bellator 182	August 25, 2017	1	3:44	Verona, New York, United States	
Win	5–4	Brittney Elkin	TKO (punches)	Bellator 181	July 14, 2017	2	4:56	Thackerville, Oklahoma, United States	
Win	4–4	Gabrielle Holloway	Decision (unanimous)	KOTC Heavy Trauma	February 4, 2017	3	5:00	Lincoln City, Oregon, United States	
Loss	3–4	Megan Anderson	TKO (head kick and punches)	Invicta FC 17: Evinger vs. Schneider	May 7, 2016	1	5:00	Costa Mesa, California, United States	
Loss	3–3	Faith Van Duin	Submission (rear-naked choke)	Invicta FC 12: Kankaanpää vs. Souza	April 24, 2015	2	0:38	Kansas City, Missouri, United States	
Win	3–2	Maria Hougaard Djursaa	TKO (punches)	Invicta FC 9: Honchak vs. Hashi	November 1, 2014	1	4:56	Davenport, Iowa, United States	
Win	2–2	Marina Shafir	KO (punches)	LOP Chaos at the Casino 5	August 10, 2014	1	0:37	Inglewood, California, United States	
Win	1–2	Brittney Elkin	Submission (rear-naked choke)	SCL: Army vs. Marines 5	April 26, 2014	2	3:48	Loveland, Colorado, United States	
Loss	0–2	Charmaine Tweet	Submission (rear-naked choke)	BFTB 2: Redemption	June 1, 2013	1	4:18	Cranbrook, British Columbia, Canada	
Loss	0–1	Tamikka Brents	Decision (unanimous)	Invicta FC 4: Esparza vs. Hyatt	January 5, 2013	3	5:00	Kansas City, Kansas, United States	

== See also ==
- List of female mixed martial artists
