= Leslie Smith (fighter) =

American mixed martial artist

- Born: August 17, 1982 (age 44); Santa Ana, California, U.S.
- Other names: The Peacemaker
- Height: 5 ft 9 in (1.75 m)
- Weight: 135 lb (61 kg; 9.6 st)
- Division: Flyweight (2013); Bantamweight (2009–2013, 2014–2019); Featherweight (2011, 2019–present)
- Reach: 67 in (170 cm)
- Fighting out of: Pleasant Hill, California, U.S.
- Team: Cesar Gracie Jiu-Jitsu
- Rank: Brown belt in Brazilian Jiu-Jitsu under Cesar Gracie and Alessandro Ferreira
- Years active: 2008–2021

Mixed martial arts record
- Total: 22
- Wins: 12
- By knockout: 5
- By decision: 7
- Losses: 9
- By knockout: 3
- By decision: 6
- Draws: 1

Other information
- Mixed martial arts record from Sherdog

Leslie Smith (born August 17, 1982) is an American professional mixed martial artist. She formerly competed in Invicta FC where she was a main card staple of the organization, having fought on the main card four times in the first five shows. She also competed in the Ultimate Fighting Championship. Smith fights out of the Cesar Gracie Jiu-Jitsu team and is noted for a similar level of high volume striking and aggressiveness to other members of that camp. Smith most recently competed in the Bellator Fighting Championships at featherweight.

A documentary about Smith's early career, Fight For It, was released in 2012.

== Martial arts career ==
=== Invicta FC ===
Smith entered Invicta Fighting Championships as a prospect with a 3–2 professional mixed martial arts record. She made her debut at Invicta FC 1: Coenen vs. Ruyssen on April 28, 2012. In her first bout with the organization, she fought veteran Kaitlin Young to an exciting draw, earning the Fight of the Night bonus (US$1,500 bonus to each fighter).

Amanda Nunes was scheduled to fight Milana Dudieva at Invicta FC 2: Baszler vs. McMann, but Dudieva withdrew from the fight on July 9 due to a medical illness and was replaced by Smith. However, on July 20, Smith suffered a hand injury that forced her to also withdraw from the fight. She was then replaced by Raquel Pa'aluhi in the fight with Nunes.

Smith was then scheduled to fight Cat Zingano at Invicta FC 3: Penne vs. Sugiyama, but the promotion allowed Zingano to withdraw from the fight so that she could accept a fight for Strikeforce. Zingano was replaced by pro boxer and undefeated MMA fighter, Kim Connor-Hamby. Sarah Kaufman was set to fight Kaitlin Young, but an injury forced Kaufman to withdraw from the fight on September 17. As a result, Smith was moved from her fight with Connor-Hamby in order to face Young in a rematch from their Fight of the Night draw at Invicta FC 1 to determine a final winner. This time, Smith was able to get the better of Young and she defeated her by TKO in the second round.

Smith competed once again for Invicta FC on January 5, 2013, this time on the main card of Invicta FC 4: Esparza vs. Hyatt against Raquel Pennington. Smith defeated Pennington by unanimous decision.

Having gone unbeaten in three fights, Smith moved up in competition at Invicta FC 5: Penne vs. Waterson when she faced former Strikeforce Women's Bantamweight Champion Sarah Kaufman on April 5, 2013. Smith lost a controversial split decision to Kaufman, which drew booing from the crowd. During the fight, Kaufman used footwork to stay on the outside whilst Smith played the aggressor and set a high work rate. Smith was able to drop Kaufman with a head kick in the second round but was unable to stop a late surge from Kaufman in the final round. The fight was declared Fight of the Night (Smith's second) and both fighters were awarded bonuses.

Smith returned to fight at Invicta FC 6: Coenen vs. Cyborg on July 13, 2013. She made her flyweight debut against Jennifer Maia in a title eliminator bout. Smith won the fight via unanimous decision. The bout was named Fight of the Night.

Smith challenged Barb Honchak for the Invicta FC flyweight championship at Invicta FC 7 on December 7, 2013. She lost the fight via unanimous decision and earned yet another Fight of the Night bonus.

=== Ultimate Fighting Championship ===
On April 8, 2014, it was announced that Smith would step in to replace an injured Amanda Nunes against Sarah Kaufman at The Ultimate Fighter Nations Finale on April 16, 2014. She lost the rematch via unanimous decision.

Smith faced Jessamyn Duke at UFC Fight Night: Cerrone vs. Miller on July 16, 2014. Smith won the fight via TKO in the first round.

Smith fought Jessica Eye at UFC 180. The bout was stopped in the 2nd round due to a stoppage by the cage-side doctor, as Smith's cauliflower ear split open.

Smith fought Rin Nakai at UFC Fight Night: Hunt vs. Mir on March 20, 2016. She won the fight by unanimous decision (30–27, 29–28, and 29–28).

Smith fought Cris Cyborg at UFC 198 on May 14, 2016. She lost the fight by TKO early in the first round.

Smith next faced Irene Aldana on December 17, 2016, at UFC on Fox: VanZant vs. Waterson. She won the fight by unanimous decision. The bout also earned Smith her first Fight of the Night bonus award in the UFC.

Smith faced Amanda Lemos on July 16, 2017, at UFC Fight Night: Nelson vs. Ponzinibbio. She won the fight via TKO due to a combination of punches and elbows in the second round.

Smith was scheduled to face Aspen Ladd on April 21, 2018, at UFC Fight Night 128. At the weigh-ins, Ladd weighed in at 137.8 pounds, 1.8 pounds over the bantamweight non-title fight upper limit of 136 pounds. Ladd offered Leslie an additional $5,000 on top of her 20% purse deduction. However, the fight was removed from the card after Smith refused to fight at catchweight. Subsequently, the UFC paid Smith her show and win money but then released her from the promotion.

=== Bellator MMA ===
An April 16, 2019, it was announced that Smith has signed with Bellator MMA. She faced Sinead Kavanagh in her promotional debut at Bellator 224 on July 12, 2019. She won the fight by majority decision.

Smith faced Arlene Blencowe at Bellator 233 on November 8, 2019. She lost the fight by unanimous decision.

Smith was expected to face Jessy Miele at Bellator 241 on March 13, 2020. However, the whole event was eventually cancelled due to the prevailing COVID-19 pandemic.

Smith fought for the Bellator Women's Featherweight World Championship against Cris Cyborg on May 21, 2021, in the main event at Bellator 259. They previously met at UFC 198, which was Cyborg's UFC debut, where she won by TKO in the first round. She lost the bout via TKO after being knocked down and finished with punches late in the last round.

== Personal life ==
Smith has an Associate of Arts degree from Pikes Peak Community College. She played water polo at South Pasadena High School, where she was named All-CIF and team MVP. She is currently studying bachelor's degree in labor and employer relations at Rutgers University.

In August 2016, Smith revealed that she had a benign tumor on her stomach.

In 2018, Smith started Project Spearhead, an organization that is attempting to unionize UFC and MMA fighters. Smith also recently gave a speech during a conference for the Economic Policy Institute regarding Project Spearhead.

== Championships and accomplishments ==
- Kickdown MMA
  - Kickdown Women's Bantamweight (One time)
- Invicta Fighting Championships
  - Fight of the Night (Four times) vs. Kaitlin Young, Sarah Kaufman, Jennifer Maia, Barb Honchak
- Ultimate Fighting Championship
  - Fight of the Night (One time) vs. Irene Aldana

== Mixed martial arts record ==
Professional record breakdown
22 matches	12 wins	9 losses
By knockout	5	3
By decision	7	6
Draws	1	

Res.	Record	Opponent	Method	Event	Date	Round	Time	Location	Notes
Loss	12–9–1	Cris Cyborg	TKO (punches)	Bellator 259	May 21, 2021	5	4:51	Uncasville, Connecticut, United States	For the Bellator Women's Featherweight World Championship.
Win	12–8–1	Amanda Bell	Decision (unanimous)	Bellator 245	September 11, 2020	3	5:00	Uncasville, Connecticut, United States	Catchweight (149 lb) bout; Bell missed weight.
Loss	11–8–1	Arlene Blencowe	Decision (unanimous)	Bellator 233	November 8, 2019	3	5:00	Thackerville, Oklahoma, United States	
Win	11–7–1	Sinead Kavanagh	Decision (majority)	Bellator 224	July 12, 2019	3	5:00	Thackerville, Oklahoma, United States	Return to Featherweight; Kavanagh missed weight (147.7 lb).
Win	10–7–1	Amanda Lemos	TKO (punches and elbows)	UFC Fight Night: Nelson vs. Ponzinibbio	July 16, 2017	2	2:53	Glasgow, Scotland	
Win	9–7–1	Irene Aldana	Decision (unanimous)	UFC on Fox: VanZant vs. Waterson	December 17, 2016	3	5:00	Sacramento, California, United States	Fight of the Night.
Loss	8–7–1	Cris Cyborg	TKO (punches)	UFC 198	May 14, 2016	1	1:21	Curitiba, Brasil	Catchweight (140 lbs) bout.
Win	8–6–1	Rin Nakai	Decision (unanimous)	UFC Fight Night: Hunt vs. Mir	March 20, 2016	3	5:00	Brisbane, Australia	
Loss	7–6–1	Jessica Eye	TKO (doctor stoppage)	UFC 180	November 15, 2014	2	1:30	Mexico City, Mexico	
Win	7–5–1	Jessamyn Duke	TKO (punches)	UFC Fight Night: Cowboy vs. Miller	July 16, 2014	1	2:24	Atlantic City, New Jersey, United States	
Loss	6–5–1	Sarah Kaufman	Decision (unanimous)	The Ultimate Fighter Nations Finale: Bisping vs. Kennedy	April 16, 2014	3	5:00	Quebec City, Quebec, Canada	Return to Bantamweight.
Loss	6–4–1	Barb Honchak	Decision (unanimous)	Invicta FC 7: Honchak vs. Smith	December 7, 2013	5	5:00	Kansas City, Missouri, United States	For the Invicta FC Flyweight Championship. Fight of the Night.
Win	6–3–1	Jennifer Maia	Decision (unanimous)	Invicta FC 6: Coenen vs. Cyborg	July 13, 2013	3	5:00	Kansas City, Missouri, United States	Flyweight debut. Fight of the Night.
Loss	5–3–1	Sarah Kaufman	Decision (split)	Invicta FC 5: Penne vs. Waterson	April 5, 2013	3	5:00	Kansas City, Missouri, United States	Fight of the Night.
Win	5–2–1	Raquel Pennington	Decision (unanimous)	Invicta FC 4: Esparza vs. Hyatt	January 5, 2013	3	5:00	Kansas City, Kansas, United States	
Win	4–2–1	Kaitlin Young	TKO (punches)	Invicta FC 3: Penne vs. Sugiyama	October 6, 2012	2	2:19	Kansas City, Kansas, United States	
Draw	3–2–1	Kaitlin Young	Draw (split)	Invicta FC 1: Coenen vs. Ruyssen	April 28, 2012	3	5:00	Kansas City, Kansas, United States	Return to Bantamweight. Fight of the Night.
Loss	3–2	Ediane Gomes	Decision (unanimous)	BEP 5: Breast Cancer Beatdown	October 1, 2011	3	5:00	Fletcher, North Carolina, United States	Featherweight debut.
Win	3–1	Julia Griffin	Decision (unanimous)	FE: Arctic Combat 2	March 19, 2010	3	3:00	Fairbanks, Alaska, United States	
Win	2–1	Louise Johnson	TKO (punches)	Kickdown 74: Grudge	January 23, 2010	2	1:35	Denver, Colorado, United States	Won the Kickdown Women's Bantamweight Championship.
Loss	1–1	Kerry Vera	Decision (unanimous)	Bellator 7	May 15, 2009	3	5:00	Chicago, Illinois, United States	
Win	1–0	Louise Johnson	TKO (punches)	Kickdown 61: Retaliation	March 6, 2009	3	4:16	Denver, Colorado, United States	Bantamweight debut.

== See also ==
- List of female mixed martial artists
