= Zak Bucia =

American mixed martial arts fighter

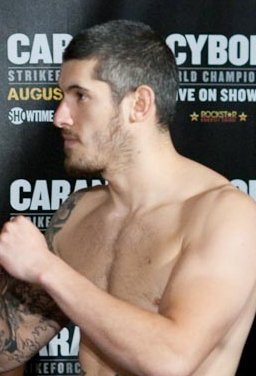
- Other names: Crash, The Kung Fu Kid, Luke Thomas
- Nationality: American
- Height: 5 ft 10 in (1.78 m)
- Weight: 170 lb (77 kg; 12 st)
- Division: Welterweight; Lightweight
- Fighting out of: Lawrence, Kansas, United States
- Team: Dragon House
- Years active: 2007-present

Mixed martial arts record
- Total: 32
- Wins: 18
- By knockout: 6
- By submission: 9
- By decision: 3
- Losses: 14
- By knockout: 3
- By submission: 1
- By decision: 10

Other information
- Mixed martial arts record from Sherdog

Zak Bucia is a professional American mixed martial artist fighting out of San Francisco, California. A professional competitor since 2007, he has fought in Strikeforce, Titan FC, and King of the Cage.

== Mixed martial arts career ==
=== Strikeforce ===
Bucia fought two amateur Muay Thai bouts before making his professional MMA debut in 2007. Compiling a record of 2-1, he signed with Strikeforce. In his promotional debut, he won via guillotine choke submission only 35 seconds into the first round. Bucia next faced a step up in competition, facing James Terry. Bucia was defeated via unanimous decision.

Bucia picked up two wins in the regional circuit before facing Terry again in a rematch at Strikeforce: Carano vs. Cyborg. Bucia lost via first-round TKO.

=== Titan Fighting Championship ===
After going 8-3 in his next 11 fights, Bucia signed with Titan FC. He made his promotional debut against legendary Brazilian fighter Jose Landi-Jons. Bucia defeated Landi-Jons via second-round knockout.

For his next fight, Bucia dropped down to the lightweight division, defeating Rasul Shovhalov via second-round submission. After a decision loss to Jason Novelli in his next bout, Bucia left the promotion.

=== Bellator ===
After going 3-1 in his next four fights, Bucia signed with Bellator. He made his promotional debut at Bellator 185, losing to Neiman Gracie via second-round submission. Bucia returned to face Derek Anderson at Bellator 197. Bucia was defeated via unanimous decision.

=== Regional promotions ===
Since leaving Bellator, Bucia has gone 1-4, having last competed in February 2002.

== Championships and accomplishments ==
- Dragon House
  - Dragon House Welterweight Championship (One time)
- Wyoming Sports Combat Association
  - WSCA Welterweight Championship (One time)

== Mixed martial arts record ==
Professional record breakdown
33 matches	19 wins	14 losses
By knockout	6	3
By submission	10	1
By decision	3	10

Res.	Record	Opponent	Method	Event	Date	Round	Time	Location	Notes
Loss	19–14	Mikey England	TKO (punches)	FAC 12: Lookin' For a Fight	February 6, 2022	2	4:17	Independence, Missouri, United States	
Win	19–13	Marcus Andrusia	Submission (kimura)	Apex FC 4	January 14, 2022	1	0:47	Kansas City, Missouri, United States	
Loss	18–13	Austin Jones	Decision (unanimous)	Apex FC 2	August 20, 2021	3	5:00	Kansas City, Missouri, United States	
Loss	18–12	Jason Witt	Decision (unanimous)	Fighting Alliance Championship 2	February 22, 2020	3	5:00	Independence, Missouri, United States	
Loss	18–11	Chris Harris	Decision (split)	Evolution Fighting Championship 10	October 20, 2018	5	5:00	Ridgefield, Washington, United States	Catchweight (175 lb) bout; for the EFC Catchweight Championship.
Loss	18–10	Derek Anderson	Decision (unanimous)	Bellator 197	April 13, 2018	3	5:00	St. Charles, Missouri, United States	Catchweight (165 lbs) bout.
Loss	18–9	Neiman Gracie	Submission (neck crank)	Bellator 185	October 20, 2017	2	2:27	Uncasville, Connecticut, United States	
Win	18–8	Aaron Highfill	Submission (armbar)	Shamrock FC 295	September 22, 2017	4	3:03	St. Louis, Missouri, United States	Defended the Shamrock FC Welterweight Championship.
Win	17–8	Bobby Voelker	Decision (unanimous)	Shamrock FC 289	May 20, 2017	3	5:00	Kansas City, Missouri, United States	Won the Shamrock FC Welterweight Championship.
Win	16–8	Adam Meredith	TKO (punches)	Shamrock FC 280	December 3, 2016	1	4:37	Kansas City, Missouri, United States	Return to Welterweight.
Loss	15–8	Jake Lindsey	TKO (knee and punches)	VFC 50	May 21, 2016	3	1:26	Topeka, Kansas, United States	
Loss	15–7	Jason Novelli	Decision (unanimous)	Titan F.C. 37: Dos Santos vs. Simon	March 4, 2016	3	5:00	Ridgefield, Washington, United States	
Win	15–6	Rasul Shohalov	Submission (Rear-Naked Choke)	Titan F.C. 35: Healy vs. Hawn	September 19, 2015	2	2:10	Ridgefield, Washington, United States	Lightweight debut.
Win	14-6	Jose Landi-Jons	KO (Punches)	Titan F.C. 34: Healy vs. Edwards	July 18, 2015	2	0:47	Kansas City, Missouri, United States	
Win	13-6	Robert Washington	KO (Punch)	Shamrock Promotions: Charged	May 29, 2015	1	4:20	Kansas City, Missouri, United States	
Win	12–6	Hugh Pulley	Decision (unanimous)	Shamrock Promotions: Destruction	November 22, 2014	3	5:00	Kansas City, Missouri, United States	
Loss	11–6	Rudy Bears	Decision (unanimous)	Shamrock Promotions: Impact	July 26, 2014	3	5:00	Kansas City, Missouri, United States	
Win	11–5	Mauricio Alonso	Submission (armbar)	Dragon House 16	May 3, 2014	4	1:55	San Francisco, California, United States	Won the Dragon House Welterweight Championship.
Loss	10–5	Billy Evangelista	Decision (unanimous)	UPC Unlimited - Up & Comers 15	May 11, 2013	3	5:00	Fresno, California, United States	
Win	10–4	Wayne Phillips	Submission (rear-naked choke)	Dragon House 11	August 18, 2012	2	2:58	Oakland, California, United States	
Win	9–4	Aaron Hedrick	Submission (rear-naked choke)	KOTC All In	April 21, 2012	1	3:36	Oroville, California, United States	
Win	8–4	Nickolas Christy	TKO (punches)	KOTC: Shockwave	July 23, 2011	2	1:39	Oroville, California, United States	
Win	7–4	Christopher Ortega	Submission (armbar)	Proving Grounds III	February 4, 2011	1	0:58	Laramie, Wyoming, United States	Won the WSCA Welterweight Championship.
Loss	6–4	Danny Davis Jr.	Decision (unanimous)	MMA Xplosion: Vianna vs. Lacy	July 31, 2010	3	5:00	Las Vegas, Nevada, United States	
Win	6–3	Sam Neeley	Submission (choke)	GC: Gladiator Challenge at the Win-River Casino	November 5, 2009	1	2:46	San Francisco, California, United States	
Loss	5–3	James Terry	TKO (head kick and punches)	Strikeforce: Carano vs. Cyborg	August 15, 2009	1	1:23	San Jose, California, United States	
Win	5–2	Daniel McWilliams	TKO (punches)	CCFC: Rush	July 18, 2009	1	1:20	Santa Rosa, California, United States	
Win	4–2	Tramain Smith	Submission (rear naked choke)	Gladiator Challenge: Put Up or Shut Up	May 31, 2009	1	2:26	San Francisco, California, United States	
Loss	3–2	James Terry	Decision (unanimous)	Strikeforce: Shamrock vs. Diaz	April 11, 2009	3	5:00	San Jose, California, United States	
Win	3–1	Adam Steel	Submission (guillotine choke)	Strikeforce: Destruction	November 21, 2008	1	0:35	San Jose, California, United States	5th Fastest Submission of 2008
Win	2–1	Adam Albright	Decision (split)	GC 80: Summer Showdown	July 18, 2008	3	5:00	San Francisco, California, United States	
Win	1–1	Justin Holdaas	TKO (submission to punches)	GC 75: Erin-Go-Brawl	March 15, 2008	1	1:06	San Francisco, California, United States	
Loss	0–1	Pat Minihan	Decision (unanimous)	GC 66: Battle Ground	March 15, 2008	3	5:00	San Francisco, California, United States	
