= Patrício Pitbull =

Brazilian mixed martial arts (MMA) fighter

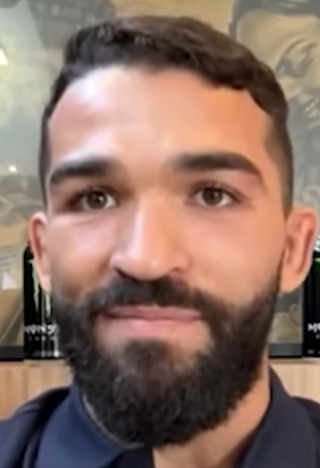
- Freire in 2023
- Born: Patrício André de Sousa Freire; July 7, 1987 (age 39); Mossoró, Rio Grande do Norte, Brazil
- Nickname: Pitbull
- Height: 5 ft 6 in (168 cm)
- Weight: 145 lb (66 kg; 10 st 5 lb)
- Division: Bantamweight (2023); Featherweight (2004–present); Lightweight (2016; 2019–2021)
- Reach: 65 1/2 in (166 cm)
- Fighting out of: Natal, Rio Grande do Norte, Brazil
- Team: Team Nogueira (until 2010); Black House; Pitbull Brothers (2010–present)
- Rank: Black belt in Brazilian jiu-jitsu
- Years active: 2004–present

Mixed martial arts record
- Total: 47
- Wins: 38
- By knockout: 13
- By submission: 12
- By decision: 13
- Losses: 9
- By knockout: 2
- By submission: 1
- By decision: 6

Other information
- Children: 2
- Notable relatives: Patricky Pitbull (brother)
- Mixed martial arts record from Sherdog

Patrício André de Sousa Freire (born July 7, 1987), known professionally as Patrício Pitbull, is a Brazilian professional mixed martial artist currently competing in the Featherweight division of the Ultimate Fighting Championship (UFC). He formerly competed in Bellator MMA where he was the three-time Bellator Featherweight Champion and former Bellator Lightweight Champion. He is the younger brother of lightweight fighter Patricky Pitbull. He was the second-ever simultaneous two-weight champion in Bellator MMA history, and is widely considered to be the best Bellator fighter of all-time. As of November 14, 2026, he is #14 in the Meta UFC featherweight rankings.

== Background ==
Freire was born and grew up in the outskirts of Natal, Brazil. Freire began training Brazilian jiu-jitsu at the age of ten to help fend off the stigma of his size. As a teenager, he trained at the famed Chute Boxe academy alongside notable MMA stars such as Wanderlei Silva and Mauricio Rua.

== Mixed martial arts career ==
=== Early career ===
Freire made his professional MMA debut in March 2004 at the age of 16. For the first five and a half years of his career, he competed in his native Brazil and amassed an undefeated record of 12–0 with all but two wins coming by way of stoppage.

Prior to signing with Bellator, Freire was ranked as one of the top prospects outside of the North American fight scene.

=== Bellator MMA ===
==== Debut and Featherweight tournament ====
After stringing together an impressive undefeated record on the local Brazilian circuit, he was initially tabbed to make his American debut against Will Romero at Bellator 14 on April 15, 2010, in the Bellator Featherweight Tournament. . However, the bout was postponed to take place a week later at Bellator 15 on April 22, 2010. He won the quarterfinal bout via first-round submission.

At Bellator 18 on May 13, 2010, he won his semifinal bout against fellow Brazilian and former EliteXC Featherweight Champion, Wilson Reis via unanimous decision.

Freire faced Joe Warren on June 24, 2010, at Bellator 23 in the Tournament Final. Despite nearly finishing the fight in the waning moments of the first round, Freire lost the fight by split decision.

==== Bellator Season Four ====
In Bellator Season Four, Freire earned back-to-back third-round KOs against Georgi Karakhanyan and Wilson Reis (a rematch of their bout the previous year) to advance to the finals of the Featherweight Tournament. Freire met Daniel Mason-Straus in the Bellator Season Four Featherweight Tournament Final at Bellator 45. He won the fight via unanimous decision and earned a title shot rematch against Joe Warren.

==== First title shot ====
The title shot was scheduled to take place at Bellator 47 on July 23, 2011, but a broken hand suffered in training had halted Freire's rematch with Joe Warren for the Bellator Featherweight Championship.

After a near year and a half lay-off, Freire returned to action at Bellator 85 on January 17, 2013, to face Pat Curran who had defeated Joe Warren to win the Bellator Featherweight Championship at Bellator 60. After a back and forth fight, Freire ended up losing a very close split decision.

==== Bouncing back to Bellator Season Nine ====
Freire was set to face Rob Emerson at Bellator 97 on July 31, 2013, but Emerson was forced out of the bout due to injury and was replaced by Jared Downing. Freire won via KO at fifty-four seconds into the second round.

Freire faced former UFC featherweight contender Diego Nunes at Bellator 99 on September 13, 2013, in the Quarterfinals of Bellator's Season Nine Featherweight Tournament. He won the fight via knockout in the first round.

Freire faced Fabricio Guerreiro in the semifinals at Bellator 103 on October 11, 2013, and won via unanimous decision.

Freire faced Justin Wilcox in the tournament final at Bellator 108 November 15, 2013. He won the fight via TKO in the first round.

==== First reign as Bellator Featherweight World Champion ====
After being skipped over for his title shot, Freire was expected to finally challenge for the Bellator Featherweight World Championship in the long-awaited rematch with Pat Curran on June 6, 2014, at Bellator 121. However, on May 21, it was announced that Curran had pulled out of the bout due to a calf injury. The rematch eventually took place at Bellator 123 on September 5, 2014. Freire defeated Curran by unanimous decision to become the new Bellator Featherweight Champion.

Freire made his first title defense at Bellator 132 on January 16, 2015 against Daniel Mason-Straus in a rematch of their bout in May 2011, which saw Freire walk away with a decision victory. Freire won the back-and-forth fight in the fourth round via a rear-naked choke submission.

Freire was expected to defend his featherweight title against former WSOF Featherweight Champion Georgi Karakhanyan in a rematch at Bellator 138 on June 19, 2015. However, after a torn ACL suffered by Karakhanyan, Freire will instead face Bellator Season Ten Featherweight tournament winner Daniel Weichel at the event. Despite being knocked down in the last seconds of the first round, Freire rallied to knock out Weichel with a perfect counter left hook early in the second round.

==== Losing the Championship and return to contender status ====
Freire had a third fight with Straus on November 6, 2015, at Bellator 145. He lost the fight via unanimous decision, dropping the Bellator Featherweight Championship after two successful defenses.

After his brother's knockout loss to Michael Chandler, Freire moved up to the lightweight division to earn a title shot in order to face Chandler. He faced Benson Henderson in the main event at Bellator 160 on August 26, 2016. The bout ended in anticlimactic fashion as Freire stopped himself early in round two to declare he had sustained a leg injury. As a result, Henderson was awarded a TKO victory due to injury. It was revealed post-fight that Freire had broken his shin in the first round after Henderson checked a low kick with his knee.

==== Regaining the Bellator Featherweight World Championship ====
Freire faced Daniel Straus in a fourth fight for the Bellator featherweight championship at Bellator 178 on April 21, 2017. After a back and forth first round, Freire won the bout via guillotine choke early in the second round to become the two-time Bellator Featherweight World Champion. Freire was later fined $2,500 for jumping onto the cage, following his submission victory.

Freire was scheduled to make his first title defense against Daniel Weichel, in a rematch, at Bellator 188 on November 16, 2017. Freire pulled out of the fight, however, due to multiple injuries. He expressed interest in a rematch with Weichel in early 2018.

For his first title defense of his second reign, Freire faced Daniel Weichel at Bellator 203 on July 14, 2018. He won the fight by split decision.

In his second title defense, Freire faced Emmanuel Sanchez at Bellator 209 on November 15, 2018. He won the fight by unanimous decision.

==== Double Champion ====
On February 20, 2019, Bellator announced that Freire had signed a multi-year, multi-fight contract extension with the organization. In the first fight of his new deal, Freire faced Michael Chandler for the Bellator Lightweight World Championship at Bellator 221 on May 11, 2019. He won the fight via TKO in the first round to become the second Bellator fighter after Ryan Bader to hold two titles at the same time.

==== 2021 Bellator Featherweight Grand Prix ====
As a first-round bout of the Bellator Featherweight World Grand Prix tournament, Freire defended his Featherweight Championship against Juan Archuleta at Bellator 228 on September 28, 2019. He won the fight by unanimous decision.

In the quarterfinals, Freire was expected to defend his Featherweight Championship against Pedro Carvalho at Bellator 241 on March 13, 2020. However, the whole event was eventually cancelled due to the prevailing COVID-19 pandemic. The bout was rebooked and took place at Bellator 252 on November 12. Freire won the fight via knockout in the first round.

In the semifinals, Freire defended his title against Emmanuel Sanchez at Bellator 255 on April 2. This was a rematch of their November 2018 bout which saw Freire win by unanimous decision. After dropping Sanchez with a flurry of punches, Freire won the bout after choking Sanchez unconscious via guillotine choke.

In the final, Freire attempted to defend his title at Bellator 263 on July 31, 2021, against undefeated A. J. McKee for the Grand Prix Title and $1 million prize. Freire was knocked down early in the fight, and lost via guillotine choke submission in round one.

On October 6, 2021, Freire announced that he vacated the Bellator Lightweight championship, not wanting to get in the way of his brother Patricky's title aspirations.

==== Third Bellator Featherweight Championship reign ====
In the first bout after losing the Featherweight title and vacating the Lightweight one, Freire rematched A. J. McKee for the Bellator Featherweight Championship on April 15, 2022, at Bellator 277. He won the bout and the title via unanimous decision.

Freire defended his title against Ádám Borics on October 1, 2022 at Bellator 286. He won the bout in convincing fashion via unanimous decision.

Freire faced reigning Rizin FF Featherweight Champion Kleber Koike Erbst in a non-title bout at Bellator MMA vs. Rizin on December 31, 2022. He won the bout by unanimous decision.

Freire moved down in weight to challenge Sergio Pettis for Bellator Bantamweight Championship on June 16, 2023, at Bellator 297. In the process, Freire attempted to become the first fighter in MMA history to have won three major world championships across three weight classes. He lost the fight via unanimous decision.

Freire faced Chihiro Suzuki in a short notice 154-pound catchweight bout on July 30, 2023, at Bellator MMA x Rizin 2. He lost the fight by a first-round knockout.

Freire was scheduled to face 2023 PFL featherweight champion Jesus Pinedo in a 3 round non-title crossover fight on February 24, 2024, at PFL vs. Bellator. However, Pinedo pulled out a week before the event with a back injury. Pitbull was instead booked against 2023 PFL featherweight finalist Gabriel Alves Braga. The days of weigh-ins, Braga was deemed unable to compete and the bout was scrapped.

On short notice, Freire defended his title against Jeremy Kennedy on March 22, 2024, at Bellator Champions Series 1. Surviving adversity and a cut, Pitbull won the bout in the third round as he landed a flurry of punches and knees on Kennedy.

On January 14, 2025, after months of disagreements online over his inactivity and contract disputes, PFL announced that Pitbull was released from his contract.

=== Ultimate Fighting Championship ===
On February 19, 2025, it was announced that Pitbull had signed with the UFC, and that he was to make his debut against former Interim UFC Featherweight Champion Yair Rodríguez on April 12, 2025, at UFC 314 in Miami, Florida. Pitbull lost the fight by unanimous decision.

Pitbull faced Dan Ige on July 19, 2025 at UFC 318. He won the fight by unanimous decision.

Pitbull was scheduled to face Losene Keita on September 6, 2025, at UFC Fight Night 258. However at the weigh-ins, Keita weighed in at 149 pounds, three pounds over the division's non-title fight limit, resulting in the cancellation of the bout.

Pitbull faced Aaron Pico on April 11, 2026 at UFC 327. He lost the fight by unanimous decision.

Pitbull faced Choi Doo-ho on September 19, 2026 at UFC 331. He won the fight by knockout in the first round.

== Personal life ==
Patrício has a wife named Teresa. They have two sons.

== Championships and accomplishments ==
- Bellator Fighting Championships
  - Bellator Lightweight World Championship (one time; former)
  - Bellator Featherweight World Championship (three times; final)
    - Nine successful title defenses (Overall)
    - Two successful title defenses (first reign)
    - Five successful title defenses (second reign)
    - Two successful title defense (third reign)
  - Second simultaneous two-weight Champion in Bellator MMA history
  - First fighter in Bellator history to have four separate championship reigns
  - Most wins in Bellator history (24)
  - Most wins in Bellator Featherweight division history (23)
  - Most wins in Bellator title fights (15)
  - Most title fights in Bellator history (18)
  - Most fights in Bellator history (30)
    - Most fights in Bellator Featherweight division history (28)
  - Most finishes in Bellator history (15)
  - Tied (A. J. McKee) for the most finishes in Bellator Featherweight division history (13)
  - Most knockouts in Bellator Featherweight division history (8)
  - Second most submission victories in Bellator Featherweight division (5)
  - Bellator Season Nine Featherweight Tournament Winner
  - Bellator Season Four Featherweight Tournament Winner
  - Bellator Season Two Featherweight Tournament Runner-up
- Bleacher Report
  - 2011 First Team MMA All-Star
  - 2015 Comeback of the Year vs. Daniel Weichel at Bellator 138
- MMA Junkie
  - 2015 #3 Ranked Fight of the Year vs. Daniel Straus 3 at Bellator 145
  - November 2015 Fight of the Month vs. Daniel Straus 3 at Bellator 145

== Mixed martial arts record ==
Professional record breakdown
47 matches	38 wins	9 losses
By knockout	13	2
By submission	12	1
By decision	13	6

Res.	Record	Opponent	Method	Event	Date	Round	Time	Location	Notes
Win	38–9	Choi Doo-ho	TKO (punches and elbows)	UFC 331	September 19, 2026	1	3:28	Los Angeles, California, United States	
Loss	37–9	Aaron Pico	Decision (unanimous)	UFC 327	April 11, 2026	3	5:00	Miami, Florida, United States	
Win	37–8	Dan Ige	Decision (unanimous)	UFC 318	July 19, 2025	3	5:00	New Orleans, Louisiana, United States	
Loss	36–8	Yair Rodríguez	Decision (unanimous)	UFC 314	April 12, 2025	3	5:00	Miami, Florida, United States	
Win	36–7	Jeremy Kennedy	TKO (knees and punches)	Bellator Champions Series 1	March 22, 2024	3	4:07	Belfast, Northern Ireland	Return to Featherweight. Defended the Bellator Featherweight World Championship.
Loss	35–7	Chihiro Suzuki	KO (punch)	Super Rizin 2	July 30, 2023	1	2:32	Saitama, Japan	Catchweight (154 lb) bout.
Loss	35–6	Sergio Pettis	Decision (unanimous)	Bellator 297	June 16, 2023	5	5:00	Chicago, Illinois, United States	Bantamweight debut. For the Bellator Bantamweight World Championship.
Win	35–5	Kleber Koike Erbst	Decision (unanimous)	Bellator MMA vs. Rizin	December 31, 2022	3	5:00	Saitama, Japan	Non-title bout.
Win	34–5	Ádám Borics	Decision (unanimous)	Bellator 286	October 1, 2022	5	5:00	Long Beach, California, United States	Defended the Bellator Featherweight World Championship.
Win	33–5	A. J. McKee	Decision (unanimous)	Bellator 277	April 15, 2022	5	5:00	San Jose, California, United States	Won the Bellator Featherweight World Championship.
Loss	32–5	A. J. McKee	Technical Submission (guillotine choke)	Bellator 263	July 31, 2021	1	1:57	Inglewood, California, United States	Bellator Featherweight World Grand Prix Final. Lost the Bellator Featherweight World Championship.
Win	32–4	Emmanuel Sanchez	Technical Submission (guillotine choke)	Bellator 255	April 2, 2021	1	3:35	Uncasville, Connecticut, United States	Bellator Featherweight World Grand Prix Semifinal. Defended the Bellator Featherweight World Championship.
Win	31–4	Pedro Carvalho	KO (punch)	Bellator 252	November 12, 2020	1	2:10	Uncasville, Connecticut, United States	Bellator Featherweight World Grand Prix Quarterfinal. Defended the Bellator Featherweight World Championship.
Win	30–4	Juan Archuleta	Decision (unanimous)	Bellator 228	September 28, 2019	5	5:00	Inglewood, California, United States	Bellator Featherweight World Grand Prix Opening Round. Defended the Bellator Featherweight World Championship.
Win	29–4	Michael Chandler	TKO (punches)	Bellator 221	May 11, 2019	1	1:01	Rosemont, Illinois, United States	Won the Bellator Lightweight World Championship. Later vacated the title on October 6, 2021.
Win	28–4	Emmanuel Sanchez	Decision (unanimous)	Bellator 209	November 15, 2018	5	5:00	Tel Aviv, Israel	Defended the Bellator Featherweight World Championship.
Win	27–4	Daniel Weichel	Decision (split)	Bellator 203	July 14, 2018	5	5:00	Rome, Italy	Defended the Bellator Featherweight World Championship.
Win	26–4	Daniel Straus	Submission (guillotine choke)	Bellator 178	April 21, 2017	2	0:37	Uncasville, Connecticut, United States	Won the Bellator Featherweight World Championship.
Loss	25–4	Benson Henderson	TKO (leg injury)	Bellator 160	August 26, 2016	2	2:26	Anaheim, California, United States	Lightweight bout.
Win	25–3	Henry Corrales	Submission (guillotine choke)	Bellator 153	April 22, 2016	2	4:09	Uncasville, Connecticut, United States	
Loss	24–3	Daniel Straus	Decision (unanimous)	Bellator 145	November 6, 2015	5	5:00	St. Louis, Missouri, United States	Lost the Bellator Featherweight World Championship.
Win	24–2	Daniel Weichel	KO (punch)	Bellator 138	June 19, 2015	2	0:32	St. Louis, Missouri, United States	Defended the Bellator Featherweight World Championship.
Win	23–2	Daniel Straus	Submission (rear-naked choke)	Bellator 132	January 16, 2015	4	4:49	Temecula, California, United States	Defended the Bellator Featherweight World Championship.
Win	22–2	Pat Curran	Decision (unanimous)	Bellator 123	September 5, 2014	5	5:00	Uncasville, Connecticut, United States	Won the Bellator Featherweight World Championship.
Win	21–2	Justin Wilcox	TKO (punches)	Bellator 108	November 15, 2013	1	2:23	Atlantic City, New Jersey, United States	Won the Bellator Season 9 Featherweight Tournament.
Win	20–2	Fabrício Guerreiro	Decision (unanimous)	Bellator 103	October 11, 2013	3	5:00	Mulvane, Kansas, United States	Bellator Season 9 Featherweight Tournament Semifinal.
Win	19–2	Diego Nunes	KO (punches)	Bellator 99	September 13, 2013	1	1:19	Temecula, California, United States	Bellator Season 9 Featherweight Tournament Quarterfinal.
Win	18–2	Jared Downing	TKO (punches)	Bellator 97	July 31, 2013	2	0:54	Rio Rancho, New Mexico, United States	
Loss	17–2	Pat Curran	Decision (split)	Bellator 85	January 13, 2013	5	5:00	Irvine, California, United States	For the Bellator Featherweight World Championship.
Win	17–1	Daniel Straus	Decision (unanimous)	Bellator 45	May 21, 2011	3	5:00	Lake Charles, Louisiana, United States	Won the Bellator Season 4 Featherweight Tournament.
Win	16–1	Wilson Reis	KO (punches)	Bellator 41	April 16, 2011	3	3:29	Yuma, Arizona, United States	Bellator Season 4 Featherweight Tournament Semifinal.
Win	15–1	Georgi Karakhanyan	TKO (punches)	Bellator 37	March 19, 2011	3	0:56	Concho, Oklahoma, United States	Bellator Season 4 Featherweight Tournament Quarterfinal.
Loss	14–1	Joe Warren	Decision (split)	Bellator 23	June 24, 2010	3	5:00	Louisville, Kentucky, United States	Lost the Bellator Season 2 Featherweight Tournament.
Win	14–0	Wilson Reis	Decision (unanimous)	Bellator 18	May 13, 2010	3	5:00	Monroe, Louisiana, United States	Bellator Season 2 Featherweight Tournament Semifinal.
Win	13–0	William Romero	Submission (heel hook)	Bellator 15	April 22, 2010	1	2:01	Uncasville, Connecticut, United States	Bellator Season 2 Featherweight Tournament Quarterfinal.
Win	12–0	Johnny Iwasaki	Submission (guillotine choke)	Platinum Fight Brazil 2	December 5, 2009	2	3:27	Rio de Janeiro, Brazil	
Win	11–0	Vinicius Borba	TKO (head kick and punches)	Eagle FC 1	September 26, 2009	1	1:24	São Paulo, Brazil	
Win	10–0	Giovani Diniz	Submission (kimura)	Platinum Fight Brazil 1	August 13, 2009	1	2:20	Natal, Brazil	
Win	9–0	Gleristone Santos	KO (flying knee)	Brazil Nordeste Combat	April 2, 2009	1	2:16	Natal, Brazil	
Win	8–0	Fernando Vieira	Decision (unanimous)	Leal Combat: Premium	June 5, 2008	3	5:00	Natal, Brazil	
Win	7–0	Paulo Mantas	Submission (heel hook)	Rino's FC 4	September 27, 2007	1	2:21	Fortaleza, Brazil	
Win	6–0	Jadyson Costa	Submission (rear-naked choke)	Leal Combat: Natal	July 5, 2007	1	4:34	Natal, Brazil	
Win	5–0	Rafael Gargula	Submission (armbar)	Tridenium Combat	April 6, 2006	2	3:05	Fortaleza, Brazil	
Win	4–0	Joao Paulo Rodrigues	Submission (guillotine choke)	Fight Ship Looking Boy 1	September 8, 2005	2	N/A	Natal, Brazil	
Win	3–0	Tarcisio Jardim	Submission (guillotine choke)	Octagon Fight 1	February 24, 2005	2	N/A	Natal, Brazil	
Win	2–0	Marlon Silva	Decision (unanimous)	Brazilian Challenger 2	October 21, 2004	3	5:00	Natal, Brazil	
Win	1–0	Dida Dida	TKO (corner stoppage)	Desafio: Natal vs. Nordeste	March 9, 2004	1	5:00	Natal, Brazil	

== See also ==
- List of male mixed martial artists
- List of current UFC fighters
- List of Bellator MMA champions
- Double champions in MMA

Awards and achievements
Preceded by Pat Curran	6th Bellator Featherweight Champion; September 5, 2014 – November 6, 2015	Succeeded by Daniel Straus
Preceded by Daniel Straus	8th Bellator Featherweight Champion; April 21, 2017 – July 31, 2021	Succeeded by A. J. McKee
Preceded by A. J. McKee	10th Bellator Featherweight Champion; April 15, 2022 – January 14, 2025; Vacated	Vacant
Preceded by Michael Chandler	8th Bellator Lightweight Champion; May 11, 2019 – October 6, 2021; Vacated	Succeeded by Patricky Pitbull
