= Strikeforce: Carano vs. Cyborg =

Strikeforce mixed martial arts event in 2009

- The poster for Strikeforce: Carano vs. Cyborg
- Promotion: Strikeforce
- Date: August 15, 2009
- Venue: HP Pavilion
- City: San Jose, California, United States
- Attendance: 13,976
- Total gate: $736,000
- Total purse: $468,500

Event chronology
| Strikeforce: Lawler vs. Shields | Strikeforce: Carano vs. Cyborg | Strikeforce: Fedor vs. Rogers |

Strikeforce: Carano vs. Cyborg was a mixed martial arts event held by Strikeforce. It was held in San Jose, California on August 15, 2009. The event aired live on the Showtime cable network and marked the first time two women headlined a major MMA event.

== Background ==
The main event featured Gina Carano taking on Cris Cyborg for the inaugural Strikeforce Women's Championship contested at 145 pounds (66 kg).

Five five-minute rounds are now featured for the women's championship bout.

Joe Riggs pulled out of his bout with Nick Diaz on July 23, 2009, due to suffering an adverse reaction to a drug. Diaz was then slated to face Jay Hieron for the Welterweight Championship belt. However, Diaz missed a pre-fight drug test mandated by the California State Athletic Commission and was denied a license to compete. Diaz was replaced with former Ultimate Fighter contestant Jesse Taylor and the fight became a non-title bout.

Renato Sobral was set to face off against Gegard Mousasi at Affliction: Trilogy on August 1, 2009, but the match was scrapped following the cancellation of the event. The fight was instead moved to this event, and changed to a title fight for Strikeforce's Light-Heavyweight Championship belt, which was already held by Sobral.

Josh Thomson, who was set to unify his lightweight championship with interim champion Gilbert Melendez, was unable to do so because of an injury. Mitsuhiro Ishida replaced him and the bout was changed to an interim title bout for Melendez' belt.

A previously announced bout featuring Erin Toughill was called off. She became the reserve fighter in case either Gina or Cris were unable to fight.

The event drew an average of 576,000 viewers on Showtime.

== Results ==
Main card
| Weight class | | | | Method | Round | Time | Notes |
|---|---|---|---|---|---|---|---|
| Women's Featherweight | Cris Cyborg | def. | Gina Carano | TKO (punches) | 1 | 4:59 | (Note: For the inaugural Strikeforce Women's Featherweight Championship.) |
| Light Heavyweight | Gegard Mousasi | def. | Renato Sobral (c) | KO (punches) | 1 | 1:00 | (Note: For the Strikeforce Light Heavyweight Championship.) |
| Lightweight | Gilbert Melendez (ic) | def. | Mitsuhiro Ishida | TKO (punches) | 3 | 3:56 | (Note: For the interim Strikeforce Lightweight Championship.) |
| Heavyweight | Fabrício Werdum | def. | Mike Kyle | Submission (guillotine choke) | 1 | 1:24 |
Preliminary card
| Welterweight | Jay Hieron | def. | Jesse Taylor | Decision (unanimous) (30–27, 30–27, 30–27) | 3 | 5:00 |
| Lightweight | Justin Wilcox | def. | David Douglas | Submission (rear-naked choke) | 3 | 3:16 |
| Lightweight | Alexander Trevino | def. | Isaiah Hill | Submission (keylock) | 1 | 3:56 |
| Welterweight | James Terry | def. | Zak Bucia | TKO (head kick and punches) | 1 | 1:23 |
| Light Heavyweight | Scott Lighty | def. | Mike Cook | TKO (punch to the body) | 1 | 2:05 |

== Reported payout ==
The following is the reported payout to the fighters as reported to the California State Athletic Commission. It does not include sponsor money or "locker room" bonuses.

- Cris Cyborg ($25,000 – includes $5,000 win bonus) def. Gina Carano ($125,000)
- Gegard Mousasi ($25,000 – no win bonus) def. Renato Sobral ($75,000)
- Gilbert Melendez ($50,000 – no win bonus) def Mitsuhiro Ishida ($30,000)
- Fabrício Werdum ($50,000 – includes $25,000 win bonus) def. Mike Kyle ($14,000)
- Jay Hieron ($55,000 – includes $30,000 win bonus) def. Jesse Taylor ($12,000)
- Scott Lighty ($4,000 – no win bonus) def. Mike Cook ($2,500)
- Justin Wilcox ($5,000 – includes $2,500 win bonus) def. David Douglas ($5,500)
- James Terry ($6,000 – includes $3,000 win bonus) def. Zak Bucia ($2,000)
- Alex Trevino ($3,500 – includes $1,500 win bonus) def. Isaiah Hill ($2,000)

== Ratings ==
The event averaged 576,000 viewers on the Showtime cable network. It peaked with 856,000 viewers for the night's main event between Carano and Justino. The Carano vs. Cyborg event set a new MMA ratings record for Showtime, eclipsing a card headlined with Kimbo Slice and Tank Abbott, which averaged 522,000 viewers. It also more than doubled Strikeforce's previous offering, Lawler vs. Shields, an event that averaged 275,000 viewers.

== See also ==
- Strikeforce (mixed martial arts)
- List of Strikeforce champions
- List of Strikeforce events
- 2009 in Strikeforce
