= James Terry (fighter) =

American mixed martial arts fighter

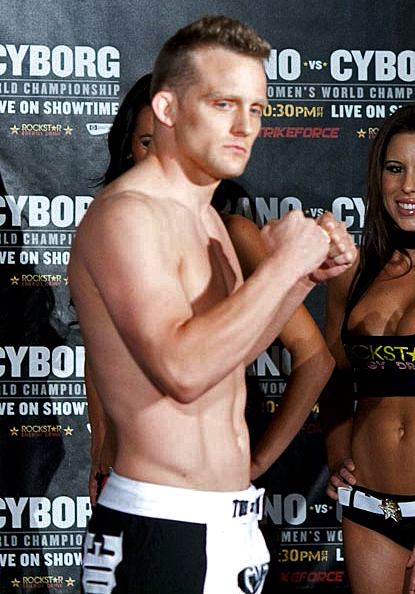
- Born: March 16, 1981 (age 45); Kodiak, Alaska, United States
- Other names: Intensity
- Height: 5 ft 10 in (1.78 m)
- Weight: 160 lb (73 kg; 11 st)
- Division: Welterweight; Lightweight
- Reach: 70.5 in (179 cm)
- Fighting out of: San Jose, California, United States
- Team: Cung Le's Universal Strength Headquarters; American Kickboxing Academy
- Years active: 2006–present

Mixed martial arts record
- Total: 31
- Wins: 20
- By knockout: 10
- By decision: 10
- Losses: 11
- By submission: 4
- By decision: 7

Other information
- Mixed martial arts record from Sherdog

James Heath Terry (born March 16, 1981) is an American mixed martial artist currently competing in the Welterweight division of Bellator MMA. A professional competitor since 2006, he formerly competed for Strikeforce. He also works as an instructor and personal trainer at Cung Le's gym and The Quad, and is a co-captain of the USH Fight Team.

== Background ==
Terry was born in Kodiak, Alaska but later moved to Arizona. Terry excelled in wrestling and originally attended Canyon del Oro High School but was kicked off the team for poor decisions inside the classroom and as an athlete. This led to Terry's subsequent transfer to Sunnyside High School where he was a four-year letterman and captain in his junior and senior seasons, and also earned All-State honors three times as well as All-City twice. Terry continued his career at Pima Community College where he was an NJCAA All-American, finishing third nationally and winning an individual regional championship while his team as a whole also won the regional championship. Terry later transferred to Arizona State University and wrestled in their Division I program.

== Mixed martial arts career ==
=== Early career ===
In 2005, Terry moved to California, where he trained in kickboxing with Cung Le. Terry made his professional debut in 2006 as a Welterweight and compiled an undefeated record of 5-0 before being handed his first professional loss at the hands of Jeremiah Metcalf. Terry was then signed by Strikeforce.

=== Strikeforce ===
Terry made his promotional debut at Strikeforce: Shamrock vs. Diaz on April 11, 2009 against Zak Bucia and won via unanimous decision. They had a rematch months later at Strikeforce: Carano vs. Cyborg on August 15, 2009 and Terry won again, this time via TKO in the first round.

Terry made his next appearance for the promotion against future Strikeforce Welterweight Champion Tarec Saffiedine at Strikeforce Challengers: Kaufman vs. Hashi on February 26, 2010 and lost via unanimous decision. Terry next fought David Marshall at Strikeforce: Diaz vs. Noons II on October 9, 2010 and won via unanimous decision. He then fought at Strikeforce: Diaz vs. Cyborg on January 29, 2011 against Lucas Gamaza and won via TKO in the first round. Terry followed this up with another first-round knockout win against Josh Thornburg at Strikeforce Challengers: Wilcox vs. Damm on April 1, 2011.

Terry then faced Caros Fodor in the main event at Strikeforce Challengers: Fodor vs. Terry on June 24, 2011 and lost via unanimous decision, snapping a three-fight winning streak. Terry then fought at Strikeforce Challengers: Larkin vs. Rossborough on September 23, 2011 against Magno Almeida and won via knockout in the first round.

Terry made his next appearance at Strikeforce: Rockhold vs. Jardine on January 7, 2012 against Nah-Shon Burrell. Terry lost in a controversial split decision, and later criticized the judging.

Terry then faced former King of the Cage Junior Welterweight Champion Bobby Green at Strikeforce: Barnett vs. Cormier on May 19, 2012. Terry again lost via split decision.

=== Bellator MMA ===
Terry made his Bellator debut on April 4, 2014, facing Rick Reeves at Bellator 115. He lost via split decision.

Terry faced André Santos on October 17, 2014 at Bellator 129. He lost the fight via unanimous decision.

Terry faced Carlos Eduardo Rocha on September 19, 2015 at Bellator 142: Dynamite 1. He won via TKO in the first round.

Terry faced Nick Barnes on December 4, 2015 at Bellator 147. He lost the fight via submission in the first round.

Terry faced Adam Piccolotti on September 29, 2018 at Bellator at Bellator 206. He lost the fight via unanimous decision.

== Mixed martial arts record ==
Professional record breakdown
31 matches	20 wins	11 losses
By knockout	10	0
By submission	0	4
By decision	10	7

Res.	Record	Opponent	Method	Event	Date	Round	Time	Location	Notes
Loss	20–11	Batsumberel Dagvadorj	Submission (bulldog choke)	Bellator 226	September 7, 2019	1	2:43	San Jose, California United States	
Loss	20–10	Adam Piccolotti	Decision (unanimous)	Bellator 206	September 29, 2018	3	5:00	San Jose, California United States	
Win	20–9	Don Mohammed	Decision (unanimous)	Bellator 199	May 12, 2018	3	5:00	San Jose, California United States	Catchweight (165 lbs) bout.
Win	19–9	JC Llamas	Decision (technical)	Bellator 172	February 18, 2017	3	0:37	San Jose, California United States	
Win	18–9	Justin Baesman	Decision (unanimous)	Bellator 165	November 19, 2016	3	5:00	San Jose, California United States	
Win	17–9	Buddy Wallace	Decision (unanimous)	Conquer Fighting Championships 2	April 30, 2016	3	5:00	Richmond, California United States	
Loss	16–9	Nick Barnes	Submission (rear-naked choke)	Bellator 147	December 4, 2015	1	2:48	San Jose, California United States	Catchweight (175 lbs) bout.
Win	16–8	Carlos Eduardo Rocha	TKO (punches)	Bellator 142: Dynamite 1	September 19, 2015	1	4:00	San Jose, California United States	
Win	15–8	Chris Herrera	TKO (punches)	DH: Dragon House 20	June 6, 2015	1	0:33	San Francisco, California, United States	
Loss	14–8	André Santos	Decision (unanimous)	Bellator 129	October 17, 2014	3	5:00	Council Bluffs, Iowa, United States	
Win	14–7	Daniel McWilliams	TKO (punches)	408 Fights: Battle of the Bay 3	July 19, 2014	1	N/A	San Jose, California, United States	
Loss	13–7	Rick Reeves	Decision (split)	Bellator 115	April 4, 2014	3	5:00	Reno, Nevada, United States	
Win	13–6	Sam Liera	TKO (punches)	Arise Fighting Championships	November 30, 2013	3	2:26	Santa Clara, California, United States	
Win	12–6	Marcus Gaines	TKO (punches)	Dragon House MMA 15	November 2, 2013	1	0:12	San Francisco, California, United States	Return to Welterweight.
Loss	11–6	Mike de la Torre	Submission (rear-naked choke)	Arise Fighting Championships	June 15, 2013	1	0:57	Santa Clara, California, United States	
Loss	11–5	Bobby Green	Decision (split)	Strikeforce: Barnett vs. Cormier	May 19, 2012	3	5:00	San Jose, California, United States	Return to Lightweight.
Loss	11–4	Nah-Shon Burrell	Decision (split)	Strikeforce: Rockhold vs. Jardine	January 7, 2012	3	5:00	Las Vegas, Nevada, United States	Welterweight bout.
Win	11–3	Magno Almeida	KO (punches)	Strikeforce Challengers: Larkin vs. Rossborough	September 23, 2011	1	3:21	Las Vegas, Nevada, United States	
Loss	10–3	Caros Fodor	Decision (unanimous)	Strikeforce Challengers: Fodor vs. Terry	June 24, 2011	3	5:00	Kent, Washington, United States	Lightweight debut.
Win	10–2	Josh Thornburg	KO (punch)	Strikeforce Challengers: Wilcox vs. Damm	April 1, 2011	1	4:38	Stockton, California, United States	Catchweight (165 lbs) bout.
Win	9–2	Lucas Gamaza	TKO (punches)	Strikeforce: Diaz vs. Cyborg	January 29, 2011	1	3:26	San Jose, California, United States	
Win	8–2	David Marshall	Decision (unanimous)	Strikeforce: Diaz vs. Noons II	October 9, 2010	3	5:00	San Jose, California, United States	
Loss	7–2	Tarec Saffiedine	Decision (unanimous)	Strikeforce Challengers: Kaufman vs. Hashi	February 26, 2010	3	5:00	San Jose, California, United States	
Win	7–1	Zak Bucia	TKO (head kick and punches)	Strikeforce: Carano vs. Cyborg	August 15, 2009	1	1:23	San Jose, California, United States	
Win	6–1	Zak Bucia	Decision (unanimous)	Strikeforce: Shamrock vs. Diaz	April 11, 2009	3	5:00	San Jose, California, United States	
Loss	5–1	Jeremiah Metcalf	Submission (rear-naked choke)	CCFC: Mayhem	May 17, 2008	2	1:47	Santa Rosa, California, United States	
Win	5–0	Josh Hinkle	Decision (split)	CCFC: Undefeated	October 6, 2007	3	5:00	Santa Rosa, California, United States	
Win	4–0	Jack Montgomery	Decision (unanimous)	CCFC: Total Elimination	May 12, 2007	3	5:00	Santa Rosa, California, United States	
Win	3–0	Tony Juarez	TKO (corner stoppage)	CCFC: Judgment Day	February 17, 2007	1	2:10	Santa Rosa, California, United States	
Win	2–0	Josh McDonald	Decision (unanimous)	CCFC: Throwdown at The Pavilion	November 4, 2006	3	5:00	Santa Rosa, California, United States	
Win	1–0	Josh Hayes	Decision (unanimous)	Warrior Cup 1	August 12, 2006	3	5:00	Stockton, California, United States	

== See also ==
- List of current Bellator fighters
