= Jason Fischer (fighter) =

American mixed martial arts fighter

- Born: March 3, 1985 (age 41); Redford, Michigan, United States
- Other names: The Finisher
- Height: 5 ft 10 in (1.78 m)
- Weight: 155 lb (70 kg; 11.1 st)
- Division: Welterweight; Lightweight
- Reach: 72.0 in (183 cm)
- Fighting out of: Detroit, Michigan, United States
- Team: Michigan Top Team
- Rank: Black belt in Brazilian Jiu-Jitsu
- Years active: 2011-2019

Mixed martial arts record
- Total: 18
- Wins: 14
- By knockout: 3
- By submission: 4
- By decision: 7
- Losses: 4
- By decision: 4

Other information
- Mixed martial arts record from Sherdog

Jason Fischer (born March 3, 1985) is an American mixed martial artist who competes in the Lightweight division. A professional competitor since 2011, he has formerly fought in Bellator, Absolute Championship Berkut and King of the Cage.

== Background ==
Born in Redford, Michigan and raised in Livonia, Michigan, a suburb outside of Detroit, Fischer competed in wrestling at Livonia Stevenson High School. Fischer later continued his career at Central Michigan University.

== Mixed martial arts career ==
=== Early career ===
Fischer started his professional career in 2011. Within his first year as a professional, he won three consecutive matches and in 2012 signed with Bellator.

=== Bellator ===
Fischer made his debut on April 6, 2012 at Bellator 64 against Taylor Solomon. He won via technical submission in the third round.

Fischer faced Kyle Prepolec on October 12, 2012 at Bellator 76. He defeated Prepolec via submission in the third round.

Fischer faced David Rickels on November 30, 2012 at Bellator 82. He was handed his first defeat via unanimous decision.

Fischer was expected to face Saad Awad on January 31, 2013 at Bellator 87. However, Awad had to replace Patricky Freire in the Season Eight Lightweight Tournament. Fischer instead faced Sevak Magakian, who has been defeated via submission in the first round.

Fischer was called to replace Alexander Sarnavskiy in the Season Eight Lightweight Tournament Semifinal due to a broken hand. He faced David Rickels again on February 28, 2013 at Bellator 91. Fischer was defeated once again via unanimous decision.

Fischer faced Tony Hervey on September 12, 2014 at Bellator 124. Fischer won via unanimous decision.

=== Coaching & Instructing ===
Fischer joined Dan Leith and Andy Slackta, who formed a jiu jitsu school in 2023, as the head black belt BJJ instructor at Commonwealth jiu jitsu in Livonia, Michigan.

== Championships and accomplishments ==
- Hard Knocks Fighting
  - HKF Lightweight Championship (One time)

== Mixed martial arts record ==
Professional record breakdown
18 matches	14 wins	4 losses
By knockout	3	0
By submission	4	0
By decision	7	4

Res.	Record	Opponent	Method	Event	Date	Round	Time	Location	Notes
Win	14-4	Josh Wick	Decision (unanimous)	WXC 77: Warrior Wednesday 2	April 24, 2019	3	5:00	Southgate, Michigan, United States	
Loss	13-4	Daud Shaikheav	Decision (majority)	ACB 65: Leone vs. Ginazov	April 21, 2018	3	5:00	Rimini, Italy	Return to Lightweight.
Win	9–3	Adam Smith	Decision (unanimous)	WXC 68: Nemesis	April 28, 2017	3	5:00	Ypsilanti, Michigan, United States	Catchweight (160 lbs) bout.
Win	9–3	Dequan Townsend	Decision (unanimous)	WXC 66: Night of Champions 9	January 13, 2017	3	5:00	Southgate, Michigan, United States	Welterweight debut; won WXC Welterweight Championship.
Win	9–3	Rafael Alves	TKO (injury)	WXC 65: College Throwdown 2	October 21, 2016	2	0:50	Ypsilanti, Michigan, United States	Won WXC Lightweight Championship.
Win	9–3	Nick Compton	Decision (unanimous)	Fight Night At The Island	September 9, 2016	3	5:00	Welch, Minnesota, United States	
Win	9–3	Jeremy Czarnecki	Decision (unanimous)	Duel Combat Sports 5	June 25, 2016	3	5:00	Detroit, Michigan, United States	
Win	8–3	Ryan Dickson	Decision (unanimous)	Hard Knocks 42	March 20, 2015	5	5:00	Calgary, Alberta, Canada	Won Hard Knocks Fighting Lightweight Championship
Win	7–3	Tony Hervey	Decision (unanimous)	Bellator 124	September 12, 2014	3	5:00	Plymouth, Michigan, United States	
Loss	6–3	Justin Wilcox	Decision (unanimous)	Bellator 114	March 28, 2014	3	5:00	West Valley City, Utah, United States	
Loss	6–2	David Rickels	Decision (unanimous)	Bellator 91	February 28, 2013	3	5:00	Rio Rancho, New Mexico, United States	Bellator Season Eight Lightweight Tournament Semifinal
Win	6–1	Sevak Magakian	Submission (rear-naked choke)	Bellator 87	January 31, 2013	1	3:37	Mount Pleasant, Michigan, United States	Bellator Season Eight Lightweight Tournament Alternate bout
Loss	5–1	David Rickels	Decision (unanimous)	Bellator 82	November 30, 2012	3	5:00	Mount Pleasant, Michigan, United States	
Win	5–0	Kyle Prepolec	Submission (arm-triangle choke)	Bellator 76	October 12, 2012	3	3:19	Windsor, Ontario, Canada	
Win	4–0	Taylor Solomon	Technical submission (rear-naked choke)	Bellator 64	April 6, 2012	3	4:59	Windsor, Ontario, Canada	
Win	3–0	Ivan Wolshlager	TKO (retirement)	IFL 39: Caged Apocalypse	November 19, 2011	1	5:00	Auburn Hills, Michigan, United States	
Win	2–0	Roger Bontrager	Submission (rear-naked choke)	KOTC: Homecoming	September 24, 2011	1	1:49	Mount Pleasant, Michigan, United States	
Win	1–0	Andrew Peterson	KO (punch)	IFL: The Saint Valentine's Day Massacre	February 18, 2011	2	0:12	Auburn Hills, Michigan, United States	
