= Marcos Rios =

Argentinian kickboxer

- Born: 11 December 1999 (age 26); General Rodríguez, Argentina
- Other names: Wasabi
- Nationality: Argentinian
- Height: 167 cm (5 ft 6 in)
- Weight: 65 kg (143 lb; 10.2 st)
- Style: Kickboxing, Muay Thai
- Stance: Orthodox
- Fighting out of: Buenos Aires, Argentina
- Team: Dojo Serpiente
- Years active: 2016–present

Kickboxing record
- Total: 94
- Wins: 79
- By knockout: 48
- Losses: 8
- By knockout: 3
- Draws: 7

Marcos "Wasabi" Rios (born 11 December 1999) is an Argentine kickboxer, currently competing in the featherweight division of Glory.

As of February 2023, he is ranked as the tenth best super featherweight (-67.5 kg) kickboxer in the world by Beyond Kick.

== Martial arts career ==
On 17 November 2019, Rios took part in the Bosch Tour Super Eight one-day tournament. He overcame his quarterfinal opponent Marcelo Romero, semifinal opponent Edwin Montaño and his opponent in the finals, Nicolás Vega, in the same manner - by first-round knockout.

Rios faced Nicolás Rosas at Guerra de Leones on 4 June 2022. He won the fight by unanimous decision.

Rios made his WGP Kickboxing return against Walter Candia at WGP Kickboxing 66: Almeida vs. Galaz on 3 September 2022. He won the fight by a first-round technical knockout.

On 23 October 2022 Rios defended his ISKA Muay Thai Argentina title against Marcos Egui at Devil Fight Night 35. He won the fight by knockout in the third round.

Rios faced the Wu Lin Feng -63 kg World champion Denis Wosik at Glory Rivals 5 on 11 February 2023. He won the fight by split decision.

Rios faced Chihiro Suzuki at KNOCK OUT 2023 SUPER BOUT “BLAZE” on 5 March 2023. He lost the fight by a first-round knockout.

Rios faced Mateus Machado at WGP Kickboxing 69 on 29 April 2023. He won the fight by a third-round knockout.

Rios faced Bazooka Koki at KNOCK OUT 2023 vol.6 on 9 December 2023. He won the fight by a second-round technical knockout.

Rios faced Facu Suarez at WGP Kickboxing 74 on 27 April 2024. He won the fight by a second-round knockout.

== Championships and accomplishments ==
- Bosch Tour
  - 2017 Bosch Tour Muay Thai -64 kg Championship
  - 2019 Bosch Tour Super Eight -64.5 kg Tournament Winner
- World Boxing Council Muay Thai
  - 2018 WBC Muay Thai Argentina -64.5 kg Championship
- International Sport Kickboxing Association
  - 2018 ISKA Muay Thai Argentina -65 kg Championship
  - 2026 ISKA K-1 Argentina -65 kg Championship

== Fight record ==
Kickboxing record
79 Wins (48 (T)KO's), 9 Losses, 7 Draws
Date	Result	Opponent	Event	Location	Method	Round	Time
2026-11-21		(Brazil) Sonny Santos	ATFC V	Buenos Aires, Argentina			
For the vacant WBC Muay Thai South America Welterweight title.
2026-09-13	Win	(Argentina) Lucas Lozano	Devil Fight Night 53	Buenos Aires, Argentina	Decision (Unanimous)	5	3:00
Wins the ISKA Argentina K-1 Welterweight title.
2026-03-14	Win	(Brazil) Matias Eliseu	ATFC IV	Buenos Aires, Argentina	KO	1	
Defends the ATFC Muay Thai title.
2025-10-11	Loss	(Spain) José M. Quevedo	Noche De Leyendas 2	Badalona, Spain	Decision	5	3:00
For the WKN Muay Thai Inercontinental Lightweight title.
2025-06-07	Win	(United States) Ardeshir Shafie	Rajadamnern World Series	Bangkok, Thailand	Decision (Unanimous)	3	3:00
2025-05-11	Loss	(Cambodia) Maeun Mekhea	Dragon Kun Khmer	Phnom Penh, Cambodia	Decision	3	3:00
2025-04-12	Win	(Brazil) Kevim Caverinha	ATFC II	Buenos Aires, Argentina	KO	1	
Wins the vacant ATFC Muay Thai title.
2024-10-12	Loss	(Japan) Yota Shigemori	KNOCK OUT 2024 vol.5	Tokyo, Japan	Ext.R Decision (Unanimous)	4	3:00
2024-05-18	Win	(Brazil) Julio Assunção	WGP Kickboxing 75	Brasilia, Brazil	KO (Punches)	1	2:20
2024-04-27	Win	(Argentina) Facu Suarez	WGP Kickboxing 74	Buenos Aires, Argentina	KO (High kick)	2	
2024-02-25	Loss	(Thailand) Dansiam Weerasakreck	KNOCK OUT 2024 vol.1	Tokyo, Japan	TKO (Doctor stoppage)	2	2:38
2023-12-09	Win	(Japan) Bazooka Koki	KNOCK OUT 2023 vol.6	Tokyo, Japan	TKO (retirement)	2	3:00
2023-10-28	Loss	(Brazil) Denis Souza Jr.	Prime Kickboxing 7	Fortaleza, Brazil	TKO (Spinning back kick)	2	3:00
For the Prime Kickboxing Super Lightweight (-64.5kg) title.
2023-06-30	Win	(Mexico) Carlos Guerra	BUDO Sento Championship 15	Veracruz, Mexico	KO (High kick)	1	1:33
2023-04-29	Win	(Brazil) Mateus Machado	WGP Kickboxing 69	Brasilia, Brazil	KO (Spinning back fist)	3	1:52
2023-03-05	Loss	(Japan) Chihiro Suzuki	KNOCK OUT 2023 SUPER BOUT “BLAZE”	Tokyo, Japan	KO (Right hook)	1	0:46
2023-01-28	Win	(Germany) Denis Wosik	Glory Rivals 5	Tulum, Mexico	Decision (Split)	3	3:00
2022-10-23	Win	(Argentina) Marcos Egui	Devil Fight Night 35	Argentina	KO (Front kick)	3	
Defended the ISKA Argentina Muay Thai -65kg title.
2022-09-03	Win	(Brazil) Walter Candia	WGP Kickboxing 66: Almeida vs. Galaz	São Paulo, Brazil	TKO (Punches)	1	2:38
2022-08-21	Win	(Argentina) Pablo Hernan	Devil Fight Night 34	Buenos Aires, Argentina	TKO (Referee stoppage/cut)	1	
Defended the ISKA Argentina Muay Thai -65kg title.
2022-06-25	NC	(Mexico) Alfredo Gonzalez	War of Nations	Cancun, Mexico			
2022-06-04	Win	(Argentina) Nicolás Rosas	Guerra de Leones	Argentina	Decision (Unanimous)	5	3:00
2022-02-14	Win	(Brazil) Zion Silva	Supreme FG	São Paulo, Brazil	TKO (Punches)	1	2:38
2021-11-21	Win	(Argentina) Carlos Machado	Main Event Championship III	Buenos Aires, Argentina	TKO (Punches)	1	2:38
2021-07-03	Win	(Mexico) Daniel Rico	Budo Sento Championship: Volume 3	Mexico	KO (Right straight)	1	2:48
2021-06-21	Win	(Mexico) Julio Reyes	RFL Muay Thai Extreme 20	Puebla, Mexico	TKO (Referee stoppage)	2	
2021-05-21	Win	(Mexico) Nahoma Hernández	Gala 3	Santiago, Nuevo León, Mexico	KO (Right hook)	2	2:59
2021-04-10	Win	(Mexico) Luis Perez	Budo Sento Championship: Volume 2	Mexico	KO (Knee)	1	2:00
2021-03-21	Win	(Mexico) Alan Parraiga	Combate Supremo	Mexico	KO (Knees)	1	
2021-02-21	Loss	(Argentina) Alan Yauny	Torneos De Muay Thai	Argentina	Decision (Unanimous)	5	3:00
For the ISKA Argentina Muay Thai -63.5kg title.
2019-11-17	Win	(Argentina) Nicolás Vega	Bosch Tour, Super Eight Final	Buenos Aires, Argentina	KO	1	
Wins the Bosch Tour Super Eight -64.5 kg Tournament title.
2019-11-17	Win	(Bolivia) Edwin Montaño	Bosch Tour, Super Eight Semifinal	Buenos Aires, Argentina	KO	1	
2019-11-17	Win	(Paraguay) Marcelo Romero	Bosch Tour, Super Eight Quarterfinal	Buenos Aires, Argentina	KO	1	
2019-09-15	Win	(Brazil) Luis Fernando	Bosch Tour	Buenos Aires, Argentina	KO	2	
2019-08-02	Win	(Argentina) Heber Gaspar	WGP 56	Buenos Aires, Argentina	KO (Right straight)	1	2:58
2019-07-06	Win	(Thailand) YodPT Petchrungruang	Bosch Tour	Portela, Argentina	Decision (Unanimous)	5	3:00
Defends the Bosch Tour Muay Thai -64kg title.
2019-06-10	Win	(Chile) Hugo Espinoza	Punishers 10	Buenos Aires, Argentina	KO (Knee)	2	
2019-05-18	Win	(Argentina) Matías Farinelli	Copa Thaibox	Buenos Aires, Argentina	KO (Right cross)	4	
2019-03-15	Win	(Argentina) Cristian Pastore	El Unico Top Fighters	Buenos Aires, Argentina	Decision (Unanimous)	5	3:00
2018-11-10	Win	(Argentina) Federico Vermengo	Bosch Tour 14	Buenos Aires, Argentina	TKO (Referee stoppage)	1	
Wins the vacant WBC Muay Thai Argentina -64.5kg title.
2018-10-27	Win	(Argentina)	Maniatics Fight 15	Santa Fe Province, Argentina	Decision	3	3:00
2018-07-22	Win	(Brazil) Luiz Goncalves	WKN Simply the Best 21 - Bosch Tour	Buenos Aires, Argentina	KO (Overhand right)	3	1:40
2018-06-10	Win	(Argentina) Erik Miloc	Punishers 9, Final	Buenos Aires, Argentina	Decision (Unanimous)	3	3:00
2018-06-10	Win	(Argentina) Franco Petrone	Punishers 9, Semi Final	Buenos Aires, Argentina			
2018-05-18	Win	(Argentina) Arturo Aguaisol	Simply the Best 19	Buenos Aires, Argentina	KO (Left hook to the body)	3	1:40
2018-04-18	Win	(Thailand) Aekmanee Sitpalapon	The Global Fight, MAX Muay Thai stadium	Pattaya, Thailand	TKO	2	0:40
2018-04-01	Win	(Thailand) Tiwthong Sakon Nakhon	MAX Muay Thai	Pattaya, Thailand	KO (Right cross)	2	
2018-03-20	Win	(Thailand) Yordarwut MaximumMuayThai	Galaxy Boxing Stadium	Patong, Thailand	Decision	3	3:00
2018-03-10	Loss	(Thailand) Chaiyo Por.Sakda	Singpatong, Patong Boxing Stadium	Patong, Thailand	Decision	3	3:00
2018-02-12	Win	(Argentina) Francisco Correa	Top Fight X-Treme	Gualeguaychú, Argentina	Decision	5	3:00
Wins the ISKA Argentina Muay Thai -65kg title.
2017-11-27	Win	(Argentina) Alejandro Rosa		Argentina	Decision	3	3:00
2017-11-17	Win	(Argentina)	Golden Fight	Argentina	KO	2	
2017-10-01	Win	(Argentina) Christian Guido	Bosch Tour	Buenos Aires, Argentina			
Wins the Bosch Tour Muay Thai -64kg title.
2017-09-16	Win	(Argentina) Pablo Orue	Kick Boxing Extremo VIII	Argentina			
2017-07-16	Win	(Argentina) Maximiliano Nuñez	Bosch Tour 5	Buenos Aires, Argentina	KO (Knees)	1	2:44
2017-06-18	Win	(Uruguay) Bruno Lavalle	Punishers	Buenos Aires, Argentina	KO		
2017-05-14	Win	(Argentina) Francisco Correa	Bosch Tour 4	Buenos Aires, Argentina	Decision	3	3:00
2017-02-26	Loss	(Argentina) Nicolas Jara	Bosch Tour 3	Buenos Aires, Argentina	Decision	5	3:00
For the WKN Argentina Muay Thai title.
2017-01-06	Win	(Argentina) Esteban Atzurica	Top Fight Muay Thai	Argentina	TKO	2	
2016-12-03	Win	(Argentina) Alan Yauny	Copa Thaibox	Buenos Aires, Argentina	Decision	3	3:00
2016-10-30	Win	(Uruguay) Emiliano Nieri	Muay Kard Chuek Fight Night	Buenos Aires, Argentina	KO (Jumping knee)	1	
2016-07-31	Win	(Argentina) Franco Presentado	Bosch Tour 2	Buenos Aires, Argentina	TKO (Spinning back fist)	2	
Legend: Win Loss Draw/No contest Notes

== See also ==
- List of male kickboxers
