= Chihiro Suzuki (fighter) =

Japanese kickboxer

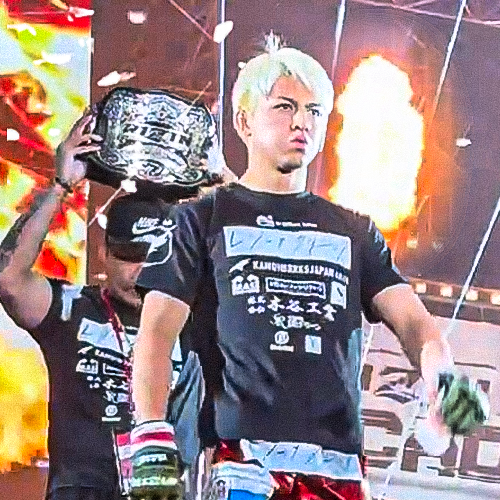
- Born: Chihiro Suzuki; May 14, 1999 (age 27); Mitaka, Tokyo, Japan
- Native name: 鈴木千裕
- Height: 173 cm (5 ft 8 in)
- Weight: 65 kg (143 lb; 10.2 st)
- Reach: 177 cm (70 in)
- Style: Kickboxing, Muay Thai
- Stance: Orthodox
- Fighting out of: Musashino, Tokyo, Japan
- Team: Crosspoint Kichijoji
- Years active: 2017–present

Kickboxing record
- Total: 13
- Wins: 12
- By knockout: 10
- Losses: 1
- By knockout: 0

Mixed martial arts record
- Total: 20
- Wins: 13
- By knockout: 7
- By submission: 1
- By decision: 5
- Losses: 6
- By knockout: 2
- By decision: 4
- No contests: 1

Chihiro Suzuki

YouTube information
- Channel: 鈴木 千裕Chihiro Suzuki
- Years active: 2021-present
- Genres: blog martial arts
- Subscribers: 41.8 thousand
- Views: 3.86 million
- Last updated: May 2, 2024

Chihiro Suzuki (Japanese: 鈴木千裕, Suzuki Chihiro; born May 14, 1999) is a Japanese kickboxer and mixed martial artist currently competing in KNOCK OUT and in the Rizin Fighting Federation. He is the current KNOCK OUT Black Super Lightweight champion.

As of April 2023, he is ranked as the ninth best super featherweight kickboxer in the world by Beyond Kick.

== Mixed martial arts career ==
=== Pancrase ===
Suzuki made his professional mixed martial arts debut against Katsuyuki Hironaka at Pancrase 284 on February 5, 2017. He won the fight by a second-round technical knockout and amassed a 2–2 record during the following year, before being placed in the Pancrase Flyweight Neo Blood tournament. Suzuki faced Kento Mizutani in the tournament quarterfinals at Pancrase 294 on March 11, 2018. He won the fight by a first-round technical knockout.

Suzuki faced Satoru Enomoto in the tournament semifinals at Pancrase 297 on July 1, 2018. He won the fight by unanimous decision. Suzuki captured the tournament title with a unanimous decision victory over Kohei Sugiyama in the tournament finals at Pancrase 299 on September 9, 2018.

Suzuki was expected to face Tatsuyuki Nakamura at Pancrase 302 on December 9, 2018. The fight was cancelled the day before it was supposed to take place, as Suzuki missed weight by 2.8 kg at the official weigh-ins. Genki Yamaguchi, chairman of Suzuki's gym, suggested he switch to kickboxing after this weight miss.

=== Rizin ===
==== Early promotional career ====
Suzuki made his Rizin debut against Shoji Maruyama at Rizin 30 - Saitama on September 19, 2021. He lost the fight by a first-round knockout, 20 seconds into the opening round.

Suzuki faced Sora Yamamoto at Rizin Trigger 1 on November 28, 2021. He won the fight by unanimous decision.

Suzuki faced the 2017 K-1 Lightweight Grand Prix runner-up Ren Hiramoto at Rizin Landmark 2 on March 6, 2023. He won the fight by unanimous decision. Suzuki revealed in the post-fight interview that he had suffered injuries in both of his hands prior to the bout taking place.

Suzuki faced Kyohei Hagiwara at Super Rizin & Rizin 38 on September 25, 2022. He was able to take Hagiwara down in the second round and forced him to tap to a rear naked choke at the midway point of the round.

Suzuki faced the 2011 DREAM Japan Bantamweight Grand Prix Runner Up and two-weight DEEP champion Masakazu Imanari at Rizin Landmark Vol.4 on November 6, 2022. He won the fight by unanimous decision.

Suzuki faced Yoshiki Nakahara at Bellator MMA vs. Rizin on December 31, 2022. He won the fight by a first-round knockout.

Suzuki was expected to challenge Kleber Koike Erbst for the Rizin Featherweight Championship at Rizin 43 – Sapporo on June 24, 2023. Erbst missed weight by 400g at the official weigh-ins and was accordingly stripped of his title, leaving only Suzuki eligible to capture the newly vacant belt. Although Suzuki tapped to a triangle choke at the 2:59 minute mark of the opening round, the fight result was immediately overturned into a no-contest, due to Erbst's weight miss.

Suzuki faced former Bellator Lightweight Champion and reigning Bellator Featherweight Champion Patrício Pitbull in a short notice 154-pound catchweight bout on July 30, 2023, at Bellator MMA x Rizin 2. He won the fight via knockout in the first round.

==== Featherweight champion ====
Suzuki challenged the reigning Rizin FF Featherweight champion Vugar Keramov at Rizin Landmark 7 on November 4, 2023. He won the fight by a first-round technical knockout via upkick and ground and pound from bottom position.

Suzuki made his maiden Rizin Featherweight Championship defense against Masanori Kanehara at Rizin 46 on April 29, 2024. He retained the title by a first-round technical knockout.

Suzuki next attempted to defend his title in a rematch against Kleber Koike Erbst at Rizin 49 on December 31, 2024. He lost the bout and title via unanimous decision.

==== Post title reign ====
Suzuki faced Mikuru Asakura at Rizin: Otoko Matsuri on May 4, 2025. He lost the fight by a third-round technical knockout. The fight was stopped on the advice of the ringside physician 2 minutes and 56 seconds into the final round, due to a cut on the eyebrow.

== Kickboxing & Muay Thai career ==
=== Lightweight ===
==== Early career ====
Suzuki made his professional kickboxing debut against Ryoga "Vulcan" Imoto at Shoot Boxing 2019 Young Caeser Cup Central 25 on May 26, 2019. He won the fight by unanimous decision, with two scorecards of 30–28 and one scorecard of 30–26. Suzuki won a single shoot point in the opening round, awarded to him for successfully planting Imoto on his back with a hip throw.

Suzuki faced Yosuke at REBELS 62 on October 4, 2019. He won the fight by a first-round technical knockout. Suzuki knocked his opponent down with a right cross 35 seconds into the opening round and knocked him down for the second time with a left uppercut 40 seconds later, which forced Yosuke's corner to throw in the towel.

Suzuki faced the 37-fight veteran Satoru Hashimoto in a -64 kg catchweight bout at the KNOCK OUT × REBELS cross-promotional event on October 4, 2019. He need just 45 seconds to floor Hashimoto with a flurry of punches, which left the veteran unable to rise from the canvas.

Suzuki faced Yoshiki in another -64 kg catchweight bout at KNOCK OUT 2019 BREAKING DAWN on November 1, 2019. He won the fight by a second-round knockout. Suzuki knocked his opponent down with a short left hook at the midway point of the round and knocked him out with a right straight soon after. The contest was briefly stopped early in the first round, as the referee accidentally poked Yoshiki in the eye while separating the fighters from the clinch.

==== KNOCK OUT Grand Prix ====
On December 16, 2019, it was announced that Suzuki would be one of eight participants in the 2020 KNOCK OUT Black -64 kg Grand Prix, which was held on February 11, 2020, at the Ota City General Gymnasium in Tokyo, Japan. Suzuki was booked to face Kyokushin karate standout and future K-1 Lightweight champion Yuki Yoza in the tournament quarterfinals. He won the fight by majority decision, with scores of 29–28, 28–28 and 29–28. The pivotal moment of the bout happened in the first minute of the final round, when Suzuki was able to knock Yoza down with a lead leg knee strike. This knockdown awarded him an automatic 10–8 scorecard and edged the scorecards in his favor, as the fight might have otherwise ended in a draw or a victory for Yoza.

Suzuki faced the SHOOT BOXING Japan Lightweight champion Renta Nishioka in the tournament semifinals. He lost the fight by unanimous decision. Two of the judges scored the fight 30–28 for Nishioka, while the third judge awarded the shootboxer a slightly wide 30–28 scorecard.

After suffering his first loss under kickboxing rules, Suzuki was booked to face the BigBang super lightweight champion Shoya Sugiyama in a -64 kg catchweight bout at KNOCK OUT CHAMPIONSHIP 2 on September 12, 2020. He won the fight by a third-round technical knockout. The referee stepped in to stop the contest at the 2:19 minute mark of the final round, judging Sugiyama to have suffered too much damage.

=== Super lightweight ===
==== Move up in weight ====
Suzuki moved up to super lightweight (-65 kg) to face Yasuhiro Matsuo at REBELS 67 on November 8, 2020. He needed just 77 seconds to thrice knock Matsuo down, which resulted in an automatic technical knockout victory for him. During his in-ring post-fight speech, Suzuki asked the promotion for another fight at REBELS 69 on December 6, just 28 days later. REBELS granted his wish and booked him to face Naoya Atsumi. Suzuki needed just 31 seconds to knock Atsumi out with a right hook.

Suzuki faced Masaya Kubo at KNOCK OUT ～The REBORN～ on March 13, 2021. He knocked Kubo out with a right straight at the midway point of the opening round.

==== KNOCK OUT champion ====
Suzuki faced Keijiro Miyakoshi for the inaugural KNOCK OUT Black Super Lightweight Championship at KNOCK OUT 2021 vol.3 on July 18, 2021. He knocked Miyakoshi down with a left hook nine seconds into the opening round. Although Miyakoshi was able to rise from the canvas in time to beat the eight-count, he was knocked down for a second time with a series of hooks 33 seconds later, after which the referee stopped the contest.

Suzuki faced Tapruwan Hadesworkout at KNOCK OUT 2022 vol.1 on January 22, 2022. He twice knocked Tapruwan down with a right hook in the first round, with the second knockdown rendering the Thai unable to rise from the canvas.

Suzuki faced Marcos Rios, who was at the time regarded as the tenth best kickboxer at his weight, at KNOCK OUT 2023 Super Bout Blaze on March 4, 2023. He won the fight by a first-round knockout, after twice knocking Rios down.

== Championships and accomplishments ==
=== Kickboxing ===
- KNOCK OUT
  - 2021 KNOCK OUT Black Super Lightweight Championship

=== Mixed martial arts ===
- Rizin Fighting Federation
  - 2016 Rizin FF Flyweight Amateur Tournament Championship
  - 2023 Rizin Featherweight Championship
    - One successful title defense
- Pancrase
  - 2018 Pancrase Flyweight Neo Blood Tournament Championship

Awards

- eFight
  - 2x "Fighter of the Month" (July 2023, November 2023)

== Personal life ==
Born to a Peruvian father and Japanese mother, his ancestry includes a mix of Japanese, Peruvian, Russian, and Spanish heritage.

=== Philanthropy ===
Influenced by his senior gym mate Kohei Tokeshi, he regularly conducts free events for children using a portion of his fight purses as part of his philanthropic activities. Following his title match in Azerbaijan, he visited a local orphanage to hold an event.

== Mixed martial arts record ==
Professional record breakdown
20 matches	13 wins	6 losses
By knockout	7	2
By submission	1	0
By decision	5	4
No contests	1	

Res.	Record	Opponent	Method	Event	Date	Round	Time	Location	Notes
Loss	13–6 (1)	Mikuru Asakura	TKO (doctor stoppage)	Rizin: Otoko Matsuri	May 4, 2025	3	1:56	Tokyo, Japan	
Loss	13–5 (1)	Karshyga Dautbek	Decision (split)	Rizin 50	March 29, 2025	3	5:00	Takamatsu, Japan	
Loss	13–4 (1)	Kleber Koike Erbst	Decision (unanimous)	Rizin 49	December 31, 2024	3	5:00	Saitama, Japan	Lost the Rizin Featherweight Championship.
Win	13–3 (1)	Masanori Kanehara	TKO (punches)	Rizin 46	April 29, 2024	1	4:20	Tokyo, Japan	Defended the Rizin Featherweight Championship.
Win	12–3 (1)	Vugar Karamov	KO (upkick and punches)	Rizin Landmark 7	November 4, 2023	1	1:28	Baku, Azerbaijan	Won the Rizin Featherweight Championship.
Win	11–3 (1)	Patrício Pitbull	KO (punch)	Super Rizin 2	July 30, 2023	1	2:32	Saitama, Japan	Catchweight (154 lb) bout.
NC	10–3 (1)	Kleber Koike Erbst	NC (missed weight)	Rizin 43	June 24, 2023	1	2:59	Sapporo, Japan	For the vacant Rizin Featherweight Championship. Koike missed weight (145.88 lb) and was stripped of the title. Only Suzuki was eligible to win the title. Originally a Submission (armbar) win for Koike; overturned due to Koike missing weight.
Win	10–3	Yoshiki Nakahara	KO (punches)	Rizin 40	December 31, 2022	1	4:44	Saitama, Japan	
Win	9–3	Masakazu Imanari	Decision (unanimous)	Rizin Landmark 4	November 6, 2022	3	5:00	Nagoya, Japan	
Win	8–3	Kyohei Hagiwara	Submission (rear-naked choke)	Super Rizin & Rizin 38	September 25, 2022	2	2:14	Saitama, Japan	
Win	7–3	Ren Hiramoto	Decision (unanimous)	Rizin Landmark 2	March 6, 2022	3	5:00	Tokyo, Japan	
Win	6–3	Sora Yamamoto	Decision (unanimous)	Rizin Trigger 1	November 28, 2021	3	5:00	Kobe, Japan	
Loss	5–3	Shoji Maruyama	KO (punches)	Rizin 30	September 19, 2021	1	0:20	Saitama, Japan	Featherweight debut.
Win	5–2	Kohei Sugiyama	Decision (unanimous)	Pancrase 299	September 9, 2018	3	3:00	Tokyo, Japan	Won the 24th Pancrase Neo Blood Flyweight Tournament.
Win	4–2	Satoru Enomoto	Decision (unanimous)	Pancrase 297	July 1, 2018	3	3:00	Tokyo, Japan	24th Pancrase Neo Blood Flyweight Tournament Semifinal.
Win	3–2	Kento Mizutani	TKO (elbows)	Pancrase 294	March 11, 2018	1	3:00	Tokyo, Japan	24th Pancrase Neo Blood Flyweight Tournament Quarterfinal.
Loss	2–2	Naoto Ayuta	Decision (unanimous)	Pancrase 290	October 8, 2017	3	3:00	Tokyo, Japan	
Loss	2–1	Kota Kawabata	Decision (unanimous)	Pancrase 287	May 28, 2017	3	3:00	Tokyo, Japan	23rd Pancrase Neo Blood Flyweight Tournament Quarterfinal.
Win	2–0	Kohei Sugiyama	TKO (punches)	Pancrase 285	March 12, 2017	1	0:08	Tokyo, Japan	
Win	1–0	Katsuyuki Hironaka	KO (punches)	Pancrase 284	February 5, 2017	1	0:30	Tokyo, Japan	Flyweight debut.

== Kickboxing record ==
Kickboxing record
12 Wins (10 (T)KO's), 1 Loss, 0 Draws
Date	Result	Opponent	Event	Location	Method	Round	Time
2023-03-04	Win	(Argentina) Marcos Rios	KNOCK OUT 2023 Super Bout Blaze	Tokyo, Japan	KO (Right hook)	1	0:46
2022-01-22	Win	(Thailand) Tapruwan Hadesworkout	KNOCK OUT 2022 vol.1	Tokyo, Japan	TKO (Punches)	1	2:17
2021-07-18	Win	(Japan) Keijiro Miyakoshi	KNOCK OUT 2021 vol.3	Tokyo, Japan	TKO (Punches)	1	0:42
Wins the inaugural KNOCK OUT Black Super Lightweight Championship
2021-03-13	Win	(Japan) Masaya Kubo	KNOCK OUT ～The REBORN～	Tokyo, Japan	TKO (Punches)	1	1:22
2020-12-06	Win	(Japan) Naoya Atsumi	REBELS 69	Tokyo, Japan	KO (Right hook)	1	0:31
2020-11-08	Win	(Japan) Yasuhiro Matsuo	REBELS 67	Tokyo, Japan	TKO (Three knockdowns)	1	1:17
2020-09-12	Win	(Japan) Shoya Sugiyama	KNOCK OUT CHAMPIONSHIP 2	Tokyo, Japan	TKO (Referee stoppage)	3	2:19
2020-02-10	Loss	(Japan) Renta Nishioka	KNOCK OUT CHAMPIONSHIP 1, Tournament Semi-finals	Tokyo, Japan	Decision (Unanimous)	3	3:00
2020-02-10	Win	(Japan) Yuki Yoza	KNOCK OUT CHAMPIONSHIP 1, Tournament Quarter-finals	Tokyo, Japan	Decision (Majority)	3	3:00
2019-11-01	Win	(Japan) Yoshiki	KNOCK OUT 2019 BREAKING DAWN	Tokyo, Japan	KO (Right straight)	2	1:39
2019-10-04	Win	(Japan) Satoru Hashimoto	KNOCK OUT × REBELS	Tokyo, Japan	TKO (Punches)	1	0:45
2019-08-10	Win	(Japan) Yosuke	REBELS 62	Tokyo, Japan	TKO (Corner stoppage)	1	1:18
2019-05-26	Win	(Japan) Ryoga Imoto	Shoot Boxing 2019 Young Caeser Cup Central 25	Tokyo, Japan	Decision (Unanimous)	3	3:00
Legend: Win Loss Draw/No contest Notes

== Exhibition boxing record ==
0 fights	wins	0 losses

No.	Result	Record	Opponent	Type	Round, time	Date	Location	Notes
1	Draw	0-0-1	(Japan) Takanori Gomi	UD	3	Jun 23, 2024	Yoyogi 2nd Gymnasium, Tokyo, Japan	

== Bibliography ==
- 『夢を叶える「稲妻メンタル」』Yume wo kanaeru inazuma mentaru(Futabasha、2023)

== See also ==
- List of male kickboxers
