= Michael Chandler =

American mixed martial artist (born 1986)

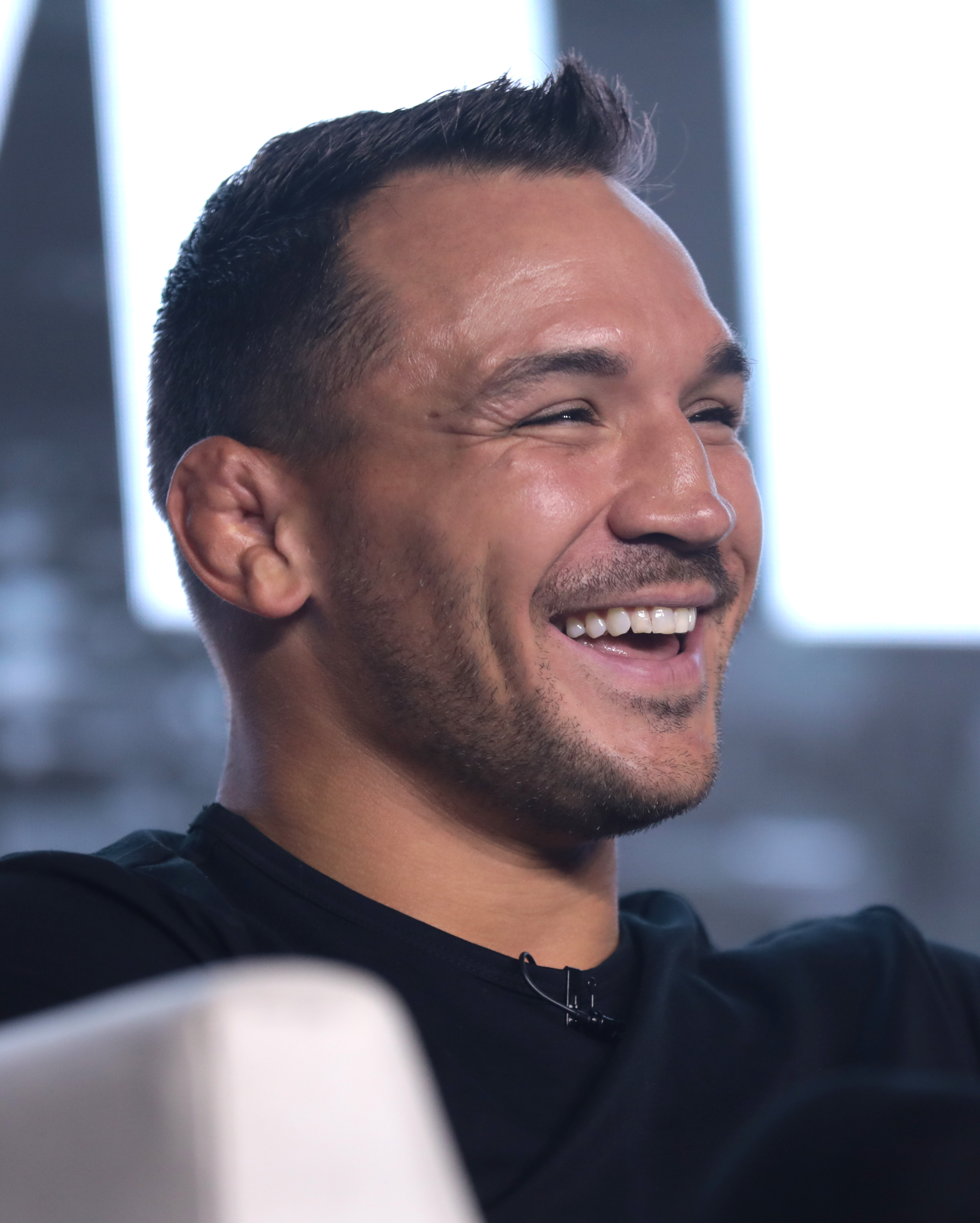
- Chandler in 2023
- Born: Michael Chandler Jr. April 24, 1986 (age 40); High Ridge, Missouri, U.S.
- Other names: Iron
- Height: 5 ft 8 in (173 cm)
- Weight: 156 lb (71 kg; 11 st 2 lb)
- Division: Welterweight (2010–2011); Lightweight (2011–present)
- Reach: 71 in (180 cm)
- Style: Collegiate Wrestling
- Fighting out of: Deerfield Beach, Florida, U.S.
- Team: Xtreme Couture (2009–2012); Alliance MMA (2012–2015); Power MMA (2015–2016); Blackzilians (2016–2017); Kill Cliff FC (2017–present); Nashville MMA (2018–present)
- Rank: Black belt in 10th Planet jiu-jitsu
- Wrestling: NCAA Division I Wrestling
- Years active: 2009–present

Mixed martial arts record
- Total: 34
- Wins: 23
- By knockout: 11
- By submission: 7
- By decision: 5
- Losses: 11
- By knockout: 6
- By submission: 1
- By decision: 4

Other information
- University: University of Missouri
- Website: michaelchandler.com
- Mixed martial arts record from Sherdog
Medal record
Collegiate wrestling
Representing the Missouri Tigers
Big 12 Championships
Silver medal – second place	2008 Stillwater	157 lb
Silver medal – second place	2009 Lincoln	157 lb

YouTube information
- Channel: Michael Chandler
- Subscribers: 106 thousand
- Views: 8.7 million
- Last updated: January 25, 2026

Michael Chandler Jr. (born April 24, 1986) is an American professional mixed martial artist. He currently competes in the Lightweight division of the Ultimate Fighting Championship (UFC). Chandler previously competed for Bellator MMA from 2010 through 2020 where he became a three-time Bellator Lightweight Champion and won the Bellator Season Four Lightweight Tournament. He challenged for the UFC Lightweight Championship.

== Background ==
Chandler was born and raised in High Ridge, Missouri, the second of four children to Michael Sr. and Betty Chandler. He is of German and Irish heritage. Chandler was on the honor roll every term in high school, received three letters in football, and finished as the runner–up at the MSHSAA State Championships as a senior in wrestling. He was voted the Most Valuable Wrestler during his senior season and was selected to the All-St. Louis Team.

Upon graduating from Northwest High School in 2004, Chandler enrolled at the University of Missouri without an athletic scholarship, walking onto the school's wrestling squad. While at Missouri, Chandler was a four-time NCAA Division I qualifier, collected 100 career wins, as well as earning fifth place at NCAA's as a senior, earning DI All-American honors. Chandler earned runner–up honors in the 2008 and 2009 Big 12 Championships and was awarded automatic bids to three of the four NCAA Championships he competed in. Chandler compiled a 31–15 record against Big 12 opponents and a 100–40 overall record in his four years as a starter. He majored in personal finance management services with a minor in real estate. He also built a close relationship with two–time Dan Hodge Trophy winner and eventual Bellator MMA World Champion Ben Askren and two–time All–American and eventual UFC Welterweight Champion Tyron Woodley.

== Mixed martial arts career ==
Immediately after his wrestling career was over, Chandler began training mixed martial arts at Xtreme Couture. He opted out of competing as an amateur and in August 2009, Chandler made his professional MMA debut with a first-round TKO victory over Kyle Swadley.

=== Strikeforce ===
Chandler made his Strikeforce debut on November 20, 2009, at Strikeforce Challengers: Woodley vs. Bears where he fought Richard Bouphanouvong, He won the bout via technical knockout in the second round.

His next fight in the promotion took place on May 15, 2010, at Strikeforce: Heavy Artillery where he fought Sal Wood. He won the bout via submission in under a minute.

=== Bellator MMA ===
Chandler made his Bellator debut on September 30, 2010, at Bellator 31, where he defeated Scott Stapp via technical knockout in the first round. The match was contested at a catchweight for Chandler to test himself for the lightweight division, all his previous bouts being in the welterweight division.

In his next Bellator appearance, Chandler competed on the Bellator 32 card on October 14, 2010, against Chris Page in a welterweight contest. He won the bout via submission in the first round.

==== Bellator Season 4 Lightweight Tournament ====
In February 2011, it was announced that Chandler would be a part of the Bellator Season Four Lightweight Tournament. In the opening round of the tournament, Chandler faced Marcin Held, at Bellator 36 on March 12, 2011. He won the contest via technical submission after choking Held unconscious with an arm-triangle choke. The win moved Chandler into the semi-finals.

Chandler then faced Lloyd Woodard at Bellator 40 and won via unanimous decision to move onto the finals of the tournament.

The tournament final took place at Bellator 44 where Chandler faced Patricky Pitbull. He utilized his wrestling skills, repeatedly taking down Freire and controlling the fight. He defeated Freire via unanimous decision to win $100,000 and a shot at the Bellator Lightweight World Championship.

==== Lightweight Championship ====
Chandler was expected to compete against Eddie Alvarez for the Bellator Lightweight World Championship at Bellator 54 on October 15, 2011. However, Alvarez suffered an undisclosed injury forcing the bout to be postponed. The bout was then rescheduled to take place on November 19, 2011, at Bellator 58. Chandler defeated Eddie Alvarez via submission in the fourth round.

In his first fight after winning the title, Chandler faced Akihiro Gono in a non-title superfight at Bellator 67 on May 4, 2012. He won the match via technical knockout at just 56 seconds into the first round.

Chandler made the first defense of his title against Bellator Season Six Lightweight Tournament Winner Rick Hawn, on January 17, 2013, at Bellator 85. He won the bout via submission in the second round.

Chandler was set to make his second defense against Bellator Season Seven Lightweight Tournament Winner Dave Jansen June 19, 2013, at Bellator 96. However, on June 2, it was announced that Jansen had pulled out of the bout due to an injury and faced David Rickels at Bellator 97 instead. He won the bout via knockout in the first round.

==== Title loss and return ====
A rematch with Eddie Alvarez took place on November 2, 2013, in the main event of Bellator 106. He lost the match by split decision.

A third fight with Alvarez was set up for the main event of Bellator 120 on May 17, 2014. However, a week before the bout, it was announced that Alvarez had suffered a concussion and was forced to pull out of the fight. Chandler instead faced Will Brooks for the interim lightweight title. He lost the back-and-forth bout by split decision.

With Bellator Lightweight Champion Eddie Alvarez leaving the promotion, Chandler faced Will Brooks in a rematch on November 15, 2014, at Bellator 131 for the vacant lightweight title. He lost the bout via technical knockout in the fourth round.

Chandler faced Derek Campos on June 19, 2015, at Bellator 138. After a dominant start on the feet, including a knockdown, he won the match via submission in the first round.

Chandler rematched David Rickels on November 6, 2015, at Bellator 145. He won the bout via technical knockout in the second round.

==== Second title reign ====
In May 2016, Bellator MMA president Scott Coker announced that Chandler would rematch Patricky Pitbull on June 17, 2016, at Bellator 157, now for the vacant Bellator Lightweight Championship. He regained the title after knocking Pitbull out in the first round.

In his first title defense, Chandler faced former UFC Lightweight Champion Benson Henderson on November 19, 2016, in the main event of Bellator 165. He won the back-and-forth bout via split decision.

In his second title defense, Chandler faced Brent Primus on June 24, 2017, at Bellator NYC. In the first round, the bout was temporarily halted by the referee to check on Chandler, whose left ankle was visibly injured. The bout was stopped in favor of Primus via technical knockout, earning him the Bellator Lightweight Championship.

==== Post-title reign ====
Following the loss to Primus, Chandler remained out of action for the remainder of 2017. He made his return at Bellator 192 on January 20, 2018, against Goiti Yamauchi. He won the fight by unanimous decision.

In a rematch, Chandler was expected to challenge Brent Primus for the Bellator Lightweight Championship on April 13, 2018, at Bellator 197. After Primus pulled out of the fight due to injury, Chandler faced Brandon Girtz on the same card. He won the fight via technical submission in the first round.

In late June 2018, reports surfaced that Chandler's contract with Bellator would expire imminently, making him a free agent. On August 22, 2018, it was announced that Chandler had re-signed a new, exclusive multi-fight contract with Bellator MMA.

==== Third title reign ====
Chandler's anticipated rematch with Brent Primus took place on December 14, 2018, at Bellator 212. Chandler dominated the majority of the fight by out-wrestling Primus, ultimately defeating him by unanimous decision and regaining the Bellator Lightweight World title in the process.

In the first defense of his new title, Chandler faced Patrício Pitbull on May 11, 2019, in the main event of Bellator 221. He lost the fight via technical knockout in the first round.

On October 25, 2019, it was announced that Chandler would return to cage to rematch Benson Henderson at Bellator & Rizin: Japan on December 29, 2019. However, Henderson was forced to withdraw from the bout citing an injury and was replaced by Sidney Outlaw in an 160 pounds catchweight bout. He defeated Outlaw via knockout in the first round.

A rematch with Benson Henderson was rescheduled to take place at Bellator 244 on June 6, 2020. However, the event was postponed due to the COVID-19 pandemic and eventually took place on August 7, 2020, at Bellator 243. He won the fight via knockout in the first round.

In August 2020 it was reported that Chandler was a free agent following his victory at Bellator 243.

=== Ultimate Fighting Championship ===
On September 17, 2020, it was announced that Chandler had signed a contract with the UFC and served as a backup for a title bout between Khabib Nurmagomedov and Justin Gaethje at UFC 254.

Chandler made his promotional debut against Dan Hooker at UFC 257 on January 24, 2021. He won the fight via technical knockout in the first round. This win earned him the Performance of the Night award.

Chandler faced long–time veteran Charles Oliveira for the vacant UFC Lightweight Championship, following former champion Khabib Nurmagomedov's retirement, while headlining UFC 262 on May 15, 2021. Despite having success in the first round and nearly finishing Oliveira, Chandler lost the fight via technical knockout early in the second round.

Chandler faced former UFC Interim Lightweight Champion Justin Gaethje at UFC 268 on November 6, 2021. After a back-and-forth fight, Chandler lost the bout via unanimous decision. This bout earned the Fight of the Night award. The bout was also regarded as the Fight of the Year by the UFC and various mixed martial arts media outlets.

Chandler faced former UFC Interim Lightweight Champion Tony Ferguson on May 7, 2022, at UFC 274. He won the fight in the second round after knocking out Ferguson with a front kick. The win earned Chandler his second Performance of the Night bonus award. It also earned him the second place Crypto.com "Fan Bonus of the Night" award.

Chandler faced former UFC Interim Lightweight Champion Dustin Poirier on November 12, 2022, at UFC 281. He lost the fight via a rear-naked choke submission in the third round. This fight earned him the Fight of the Night award.

Chandler and Conor McGregor served as opposing coaches on The Ultimate Fighter 31, which began filming in February 2023 and aired from May to August 2023. The season concluded with Chandler being scheduled to face McGregor in a welterweight bout at UFC 303 on June 29, 2024. Following speculation about the bout's status after an abruptly canceled press conference, the UFC officially announced the fight's cancellation on June 13, 2024, citing an injury sustained by McGregor. In September 2024, reports indicated that Chandler was "done waiting" to face McGregor.

In a rematch, Chandler faced former UFC Lightweight Champion Charles Oliveira in a 5-round bout on November 16, 2024, at UFC 309. He lost the fight by unanimous decision. This fight earned him another Fight of the Night award.

Chandler faced former Cage Warriors Featherweight Champion Paddy Pimblett in the five-round co-main event on April 12, 2025, at UFC 314. He lost the fight by technical knockout in the third round.

On September 20, 2025, multiple media outlets reported that Chandler was being targeted as a potential opponent for Conor McGregor at the UFC Freedom 250 event scheduled for June 14, 2026. The proposed bout was intended to serve as the culmination of their rivalry, which began during their tenure as opposing coaches on the 2023 season of The Ultimate Fighter: Team McGregor vs. Team Chandler.

Chandler instead faced Maurício Ruffy on June 14, 2026 at UFC Freedom 250. He lost the fight by technical knockout via a spinning wheel kick and punches in the first round.

== Personal life ==
Chandler started dating Brie Willett in 2013 after emailing for almost two years. Subsequently, they got married in 2014. The couple grew their family through adoption in 2017, welcoming their son Hap. In April 2022, their second adoptive son Ace was born.

Chandler owns Training Camp, a fitness and MMA gym in Nashville.

== Championships and accomplishments ==
=== Mixed martial arts ===
- Ultimate Fighting Championship
  - Performance of the Night (Two times) vs. Dan Hooker and Tony Ferguson
  - Fight of the Night (Three times) vs. Justin Gaethje, Dustin Poirier and Charles Oliveira 2
  - UFC Honors Awards
    - 2021: President's Choice Fight of the Year Winner vs. Justin Gaethje & Fan's Choice Debut of the Year Winner vs. vs. Dan Hooker
    - 2022: President's Choice Performance of the Year Nominee vs. Tony Ferguson, President's Choice Fight of the Year Nominee vs. Dustin Poirier & Fan's Choice Knockout of the Year Nominee vs. Tony Ferguson
  - UFC.com Awards
    - 2021: Fight of the Year vs. Justin Gaethje, Half-Year Awards: Best Newcomer of the 1HY, Ranked #3 Newcomer of the Year & Ranked #10 Fight of the Year vs. Charles Oliveira 1
    - 2022: Ranked #3 Fight of the Year vs. Dustin Poirier & Ranked #2 Knockout of the Year vs. Tony Ferguson
- Crypto.com
  - Fan Bonus of the Night vs. Tony Ferguson
- Bellator Fighting Championships
  - Bellator Lightweight World Championship (Three times)
    - Two successful title defenses (first reign)
    - One successful title defense (second reign)
    - Three successful title defenses (overall)
  - Bellator Season 4 Lightweight Tournament Championship
  - Most submission victories in Bellator Lightweight division (6)
  - Tied (with David Rickels) for fourth most fights in Bellator history (23)
  - Tied (with A. J. McKee) for second most stoppage wins in Bellator MMA history (13)
  - Second most stoppage wins in Bellator Lightweight division history (10) (behind Patricky Pitbull)
  - Second most title bouts in Bellator MMA history (11)
  - Second most wins in Bellator Lightweight division history (15) (behind Patricky Pitbull)
  - Third most wins in Bellator MMA history (18)
  - Tied (with Ilima-Lei Macfarlane and Neiman Gracie) for second most submission wins in Bellator MMA history (6)
- MMA Junkie
  - 2016 June Knockout of the Month vs. Patricky Freire on June 24
  - 2021 May Fight of the Month vs. Charles Oliveira
  - 2021 November Fight of the Month vs. Justin Gaethje
  - 2021 Fight of the Year vs. Justin Gaethje
  - 2022 May Knockout of the Month vs. Tony Ferguson
- MMA Fighting
  - 2021 Fight of the Year vs. Justin Gaethje
- Sherdog
  - 2011 Breakthrough Fighter of the Year
  - 2021 Fight of the Year vs. Justin Gaethje
  - 2021 Round of the Year vs. Justin Gaethje
  - 2022 Knockout of the year
- Yahoo! Sports
  - 2011 Fight of the Year vs. Eddie Alvarez on November 19
  - 2021 Fight of the Year vs. Justin Gaethje
- Cageside Press
  - 2021 Fight of the Year vs. Justin Gaethje
  - 2022 Knockout of the Year vs. Tony Ferguson, tied with Leon Edwards
- Lowkick MMA
  - 2021 Fight of the Year vs. Justin Gaethje
- Bleacher Report
  - 2021 Fight of the Year vs. Justin Gaethje
- CBS Sports
  - 2021 Fight of the Year vs. Justin Gaethje
  - 2021 #3 Ranked UFC Fight of the Year vs. Charles Oliveira
- Daily Mirror
  - 2021 Fight of the Year vs. Justin Gaethje
- Combat Press
  - 2021 Fight of the Year vs. Justin Gaethje
- Wrestling Observer Newsletter
  - 2021 MMA Match of the Year vs. Justin Gaethje at UFC 268
- World MMA Awards
  - 2022 Knockout of the Year vs. Tony Ferguson at UFC 274
- Sports Illustrated
  - 2022 Knockout of the Year vs. Tony Ferguson at UFC 274
- Fight Matrix
  - 2011 Most Improved Fighter of the Year
- BodySlam.net
  - 2024 Round of the Year Round 5 vs. Charles Oliveira at UFC 309

=== Amateur wrestling ===
- National Collegiate Athletic Association
  - NCAA Division I All-American (2009)
  - Big 12 Conference Championship Runner-up (2008, 2009)
  - University of Missouri Wrestling Team Captain (2007–2009)
  - Ed Lampitt Coaches Award (2009)
  - Hap Whitney Coaches Award (2006)
  - Hap Whitney Most Improved Wrestler (2006)
- Missouri State High School Activities Association
  - MSHSAA High School State Championship Runner-up (2004)
  - All-St. Louis Team (2004)

== Mixed martial arts record ==
Professional record breakdown
34 matches	23 wins	11 losses
By knockout	11	6
By submission	7	1
By decision	5	4

Res.	Record	Opponent	Method	Event	Date	Round	Time	Location	Notes
Loss	23–11	Maurício Ruffy	TKO (spinning wheel kick and punches)	UFC Freedom 250	June 14, 2026	1	4:29	Washington, D.C., United States	
Loss	23–10	Paddy Pimblett	TKO (elbows and punches)	UFC 314	April 12, 2025	3	3:07	Miami, Florida, United States	
Loss	23–9	Charles Oliveira	Decision (unanimous)	UFC 309	November 16, 2024	5	5:00	New York City, New York, United States	Fight of the Night.
Loss	23–8	Dustin Poirier	Submission (rear-naked choke)	UFC 281	November 12, 2022	3	2:00	New York City, New York, United States	Fight of the Night.
Win	23–7	Tony Ferguson	KO (front kick)	UFC 274	May 7, 2022	2	0:17	Phoenix, Arizona, United States	Performance of the Night.
Loss	22–7	Justin Gaethje	Decision (unanimous)	UFC 268	November 6, 2021	3	5:00	New York City, New York, United States	Fight of the Night.
Loss	22–6	Charles Oliveira	TKO (punches)	UFC 262	May 15, 2021	2	0:19	Houston, Texas, United States	For the vacant UFC Lightweight Championship.
Win	22–5	Dan Hooker	TKO (punches)	UFC 257	January 24, 2021	1	2:30	Abu Dhabi, United Arab Emirates	Performance of the Night.
Win	21–5	Benson Henderson	KO (punches)	Bellator 243	August 7, 2020	1	2:09	Uncasville, Connecticut, United States	
Win	20–5	Sidney Outlaw	KO (punches)	Bellator 237	December 29, 2019	1	2:59	Saitama, Japan	Catchweight (160 lb) bout.
Loss	19–5	Patrício Pitbull	TKO (punches)	Bellator 221	May 11, 2019	1	1:01	Rosemont, Illinois, United States	Lost the Bellator Lightweight World Championship.
Win	19–4	Brent Primus	Decision (unanimous)	Bellator 212	December 14, 2018	5	5:00	Honolulu, Hawaii, United States	Won the Bellator Lightweight World Championship.
Win	18–4	Brandon Girtz	Technical Submission (arm-triangle choke)	Bellator 197	April 13, 2018	1	4:00	St. Charles, Missouri, United States	
Win	17–4	Goiti Yamauchi	Decision (unanimous)	Bellator 192	January 20, 2018	3	5:00	Inglewood, California, United States	
Loss	16–4	Brent Primus	TKO (doctor stoppage)	Bellator NYC	June 24, 2017	1	2:22	New York City, New York, United States	Lost the Bellator Lightweight World Championship.
Win	16–3	Benson Henderson	Decision (split)	Bellator 165	November 19, 2016	5	5:00	San Jose, California, United States	Defended the Bellator Lightweight World Championship.
Win	15–3	Patricky Pitbull	KO (punch)	Bellator 157: Dynamite 2	June 24, 2016	1	2:14	St. Louis, Missouri, United States	Won the vacant Bellator Lightweight World Championship.
Win	14–3	David Rickels	TKO (punches)	Bellator 145	November 6, 2015	2	3:05	St. Louis, Missouri, United States	
Win	13–3	Derek Campos	Submission (rear-naked choke)	Bellator 138	June 19, 2015	1	2:17	St. Louis, Missouri, United States	
Loss	12–3	Will Brooks	TKO (punches)	Bellator 131	November 15, 2014	4	3:48	San Diego, California, United States	For the vacant Bellator Lightweight World Championship.
Loss	12–2	Will Brooks	Decision (split)	Bellator 120	May 17, 2014	5	5:00	Southaven, Mississippi, United States	For the interim Bellator Lightweight World Championship.
Loss	12–1	Eddie Alvarez	Decision (split)	Bellator 106	November 2, 2013	5	5:00	Long Beach, California, United States	Lost the Bellator Lightweight World Championship.
Win	12–0	David Rickels	KO (punches)	Bellator 97	July 31, 2013	1	0:44	Rio Rancho, New Mexico, United States	Defended the Bellator Lightweight World Championship.
Win	11–0	Rick Hawn	Submission (rear-naked choke)	Bellator 85	January 17, 2013	2	3:07	Irvine, California, United States	Defended the Bellator Lightweight World Championship.
Win	10–0	Akihiro Gono	TKO (punches)	Bellator 67	May 4, 2012	1	0:56	Rama, Ontario, Canada	Non-title bout.
Win	9–0	Eddie Alvarez	Submission (rear-naked choke)	Bellator 58	November 19, 2011	4	3:06	Hollywood, Florida, United States	Won the Bellator Lightweight World Championship.
Win	8–0	Patricky Pitbull	Decision (unanimous)	Bellator 44	May 14, 2011	3	5:00	Atlantic City, New Jersey, United States	Won the Bellator Season 4 Lightweight Tournament.
Win	7–0	Lloyd Woodard	Decision (unanimous)	Bellator 40	April 9, 2011	3	5:00	Newkirk, Oklahoma, United States	Bellator Season 4 Lightweight Tournament Semifinal.
Win	6–0	Marcin Held	Technical Submission (arm-triangle choke)	Bellator 36	March 12, 2011	1	3:56	Shreveport, Louisiana, United States	Lightweight debut. Bellator Season 4 Lightweight Tournament Quarterfinal.
Win	5–0	Chris Page	Submission (standing guillotine choke)	Bellator 32	October 14, 2010	1	0:57	Kansas City, Missouri, United States	Catchweight (165 lb) bout.
Win	4–0	Scott Stapp	TKO (punches)	Bellator 31	September 30, 2010	1	1:57	Lake Charles, Louisiana, United States	Catchweight (165 lb) bout.
Win	3–0	Sal Woods	Submission (rear-naked choke)	Strikeforce: Heavy Artillery	May 15, 2010	1	0:59	St. Louis, Missouri, United States	
Win	2–0	Richard Bouphanouvong	TKO (punches)	Strikeforce Challengers: Woodley vs. Bears	November 20, 2009	2	2:07	Kansas City, Kansas, United States	Catchweight (165 lb) bout.
Win	1–0	Kyle Swadley	TKO (punches)	First Blood	August 8, 2009	1	3:30	Lake Ozark, Missouri, United States	Welterweight debut.

== Pay-per-view bouts ==
No.	Event	Fight	Date	Venue	City	PPV Buys
1.	UFC 262	Oliveira vs. Chandler	May 15, 2021	Toyota Center	Houston, Texas, United States	300,000

== NCAA record ==
NCAA Championships Matches
Res.	Record	Opponent	Score	Date	Event
2009 NCAA Championships 5th at 157 lbs
Win	10–8	Matt Moley	2–1	March 19–21, 2009	2009 NCAA Division I Wrestling Championships
Loss	9–8	Gregor Gillespie	MD 2–10	March 19–21, 2009	2009 NCAA Division I Wrestling Championships
Win	9–7	Tyler Safratowich	MD 13–5	March 19–21, 2009	2009 NCAA Division I Wrestling Championships
Win	8–7	Jonny Bonilla-Bowman	6–5	March 19–21, 2009	2009 NCAA Division I Wrestling Championships
Loss	7–7	Jordan Leen	2–4	March 19–21, 2009	2009 NCAA Division I Wrestling Championships
Win	7–6	Chase Pami	6–0	March 19–21, 2009	2009 NCAA Division I Wrestling Championships
Win	6–6	Kurt Kinser	4–3	March 19–21, 2009	2009 NCAA Division I Wrestling Championships
2008 NCAA Championships at 157 lbs
Loss	5–6	Brandon Becker	2–8	March 20–22, 2008	2008 NCAA Division I Wrestling Championships
Loss	5–5	Michael Poeta	3–7	March 20–22, 2008	2008 NCAA Division I Wrestling Championships
Win	5–4	Cyler Sanderson	5–3	March 20–22, 2008	2008 NCAA Division I Wrestling Championships
Win	4–4	Dave Nakasone	5–3	March 20–22, 2008	2008 NCAA Division I Wrestling Championships
2007 NCAA Championships at 157 lbs
Loss	3–4	Ryan Hluschak	5–10	March 15–17, 2007	2007 NCAA Division I Wrestling Championships
Win	3–3	Chris Oliver	MD 11–2	March 15–17, 2007	2007 NCAA Division I Wrestling Championships
Win	2–3	Tyler Shirley	Fall	March 15–17, 2007	2007 NCAA Division I Wrestling Championships
Loss	1–3	Bubba Jenkins	MD 3–15	March 15–17, 2007	2007 NCAA Division I Wrestling Championships
2006 NCAA Championships at 157 lbs
Loss	1–2	Brandon Becker	4–10	March 16–18, 2006	2006 NCAA Division I Wrestling Championships
Loss	1–1	Ben Cherrington	1–8	March 16–18, 2006	2006 NCAA Division I Wrestling Championships
Win	1–0	Matt Lebe	3–2	March 16–18, 2006	2006 NCAA Division I Wrestling Championships

== Freestyle wrestling record ==
Freestyle matches
Res.	Record	Opponent	Score	Date	Event	Location
Win	1–0	(United States) Chad Mendes	4–1	November 29, 2025	RAF 03	(United States) Chicago, Illinois

== WWE cameo ==
On November 4, 2026 episode of NXT, Chandler is the special guest referee and enforcer of the Unsanction match between Cruz Montana of 946 and Dion Lennox of DarkState.

== See also ==
- List of current UFC fighters
- List of Strikeforce alumni

Awards and achievements
Preceded by Eddie Alvarez	2nd Bellator Lightweight World Champion; November 19, 2011 – November 2, 2013	Succeeded by Eddie Alvarez
Vacant Title last held by Will Brooks	5th Bellator Lightweight World Champion; June 24, 2016 – June 24, 2017	Succeeded by Brent Primus
Preceded by Brent Primus	7th Bellator Lightweight World Champion; December 14, 2018 – May 11, 2019	Succeeded by Patrício Pitbull
