= André Santos (fighter) =

Brazilian mixed martial arts fighter

- Born: January 8, 1981 (age 45); Brazil
- Other names: Chatuba
- Height: 5 ft 11 in (1.80 m)
- Weight: 170.2 lb (77.2 kg; 12.16 st)
- Division: Welterweight
- Reach: 74.0
- Stance: Orthodox
- Fighting out of: Rio de Janeiro, Brazil
- Team: Renovação Fight Team
- Rank: Black belt in Luta Livre
- Years active: 2006–present

Mixed martial arts record
- Total: 49
- Wins: 38
- By knockout: 5
- By submission: 22
- By decision: 11
- Losses: 11
- By knockout: 5
- By submission: 3
- By decision: 3

Other information
- Mixed martial arts record from Sherdog

André Santos (born January 8, 1981) is a Brazilian mixed martial artist currently competing in the Welterweight division of Absolute Championship Berkut. A professional competitor since 2006, he has also competed for Bellator.

== Mixed martial arts career ==
=== Early career ===
Santos made his professional MMA debut in December 2006 and, prior to signing with Bellator, he amassed a 36–9 record fighting outside of the United States, mainly in his native Brazil. During this time, Santos won the vacant MMA Champions League welterweight championship. He also unsuccessfully fought for the Bitetti Combat welterweight championship.

Santos was ranked as the ninth best welterweight prospect by MMA website Bloody Elbow in 2012.

=== Bellator MMA ===
Santos made his Bellator and United States debut on October 17, 2014, against Strikeforce veteran James Terry at Bellator 129. He won the fight via unanimous decision.

Replacing an injured Douglas Lima, Santos faced Paul Daley at Bellator 134 on February 27, 2015. He lost the fight via unanimous decision.

Santos faced UFC veteran, Josh Neer, at Bellator 146 on November 20, 2015. He won the fight via unanimous decision.

== Championships and accomplishments ==
=== Mixed martial arts ===
- MMA Champions League
  - MMACL welterweight championship (one time)

== Mixed martial arts record ==
Professional record breakdown
48 matches	38 wins	10 losses
By knockout	5	4
By submission	22	3
By decision	11	3

Res.	Record	Opponent	Method	Event	Date	Round	Time	Location	Notes
Loss	38–11	Brett Cooper	KO (punches)	ACB 82: Silva vs. Kolobegov	March 9, 2018	1	1:42	São Paulo, Brazil	
Win	38–10	Josh Neer	Decision (unanimous)	Bellator 146	November 20, 2015	3	5:00	Thackerville, Oklahoma, United States	
Loss	37–10	Paul Daley	Decision (unanimous)	Bellator 134	February 27, 2015	3	5:00	Uncasville, Connecticut, United States	
Win	37–9	James Terry	Decision (unanimous)	Bellator 129	October 17, 2014	3	5:00	Council Bluffs, Iowa, United States	
Win	36–9	Ramil Mustapayev	KO (punches)	Fight Nights: Battle of Moscow 13	October 26, 2013	2	0:41	Moscow, Russia	
Win	35–9	Beslan Isaev	Submission (guillotine choke)	Fight Nights: Battle on Terek	October 4, 2013	2	3:51	Grozny, Russia	
Win	34–9	Ney Duarte dos Santos	Submission (anaconda choke)	Gigante Fight: Mixed Martial Arts	June 29, 2013	1	2:11	Cabo Frio, Rio de Janeiro, Brazil	
Win	33–9	Cassiano Ricardo Castanho de Freitas	TKO (punches)	MMA Champions League	March 25, 2013	1	4:39	Barra da Tijuca, Rio de Janeiro, Brazil	Won vacant MMA Champions League Welterweight Championship.
Win	32–9	Chad Reiner	Submission (anaconda choke)	Show Fighting Enterprise 1	March 1, 2013	1	3:31	Quito, Ecuador	
Loss	31–9	Hernani Perpetuo	Decision (unanimous)	Web Fight Combat	January 27, 2013	3	5:00	Rio de Janeiro, Brazil	
Loss	31–8	Sérgio Souza	TKO (punches)	Team Nogueira: MMA Circuit 2	January 12, 2013	3	N/A	Rio de Janeiro, Brazil	
Win	31–7	Moises dos Santos	Submission (D'arce choke)	BOTB: Para vs. Brazil	November 29, 2012	1	1:20	Belém, Pará, Brazil	
Loss	30–7	Cassiano Ricardo Castanho de Freitas	Submission (guillotine choke)	Bitetti Combat 12: Oswaldo Paqueta	September 8, 2012	1	1:00	Rocinha, Rio de Janeiro, Brazil	For Bitetti Combat Welterweight Championship.
Win	30–6	Gil de Freitas	Decision (unanimous)	Mortal Kombat Championship 1	April 20, 2012	3	5:00	Rio de Janeiro, Brazil	
Win	29–6	Julian Fabrin Soares	Submission (anaconda choke)	Bitetti Combat 10	October 15, 2011	2	2:31	Rio de Janeiro, Brazil	
Win	28–6	Edilberto de Oliveira	Decision (unanimous)	Bitetti Combat 10	October 15, 2011	2	5:00	Rio de Janeiro, Brazil	
Win	27–6	Ivan Jorge	Decision (unanimous)	Bitetti Combat 10	October 15, 2011	3	5:00	Rio de Janeiro, Brazil	
Win	26–6	Tiago Monaco Tosato	Submission (anaconda choke)	High Fight Rock 1	September 17, 2011	1	1:40	Goiânia, Goiás, Brazil	
Loss	25–6	Jose de Ribamar Machado Gomes	TKO (punches)	WFE 9: Platinum	May 14, 2011	2	1:20	Salvador, Bahia, Brazil	
Loss	25–5	Mauro Chimento Jr.	Submission (armbar)	Watch Out Combat Show 11	April 29, 2011	1	1:29	Campo Grande, Mato Grosso do Sul, Brazil	
Win	25–4	Jucelino Ferreira	TKO (punches)	Face to Face 4	April 23, 2011	2	3:10	Recreio dos Bandeirantes, Rio de Janeiro, Brazil	
Win	24–4	Alberto dos Santos	Submission (anaconda choke)	X-Fight	January 15, 2011	1	3:36	Rio de Janeiro, Brazil	
Loss	23–4	Mario Sartori	TKO (fighter quit after falling from ring)	Capital Fight 3	November 5, 2010	1	N/A	Brasília, Brazil	
Win	23–3	Gilmar Silva Milhorance	Submission (anaconda choke)	Juiz de Fora Fight: Evolution	October 2, 2010	2	N/A	Juiz de Fora, Minas Gerais, Brazil	
Loss	22–3	Wendell de Oliveira Marques	Decision (unanimous)	Mega Kombat	July 24, 2010	3	5:00	Governador Valadares, Minas Gerais, Brazil	
Win	22–2	Luis Sérgio Melo Jr.	Technical Submission (anaconda choke)	Nitrix Champion Fight 5	May 15, 2010	2	2:09	Balneário Camboriú, Santa Catarina, Brazil	
Win	21–2	Rondinelli Rodrigues Gomes	Decision (unanimous)	Natal Fight Championship 2	November 12, 2009	3	5:00	Natal, Rio Grande do Norte, Brazil	
Win	20–2	Johnny Vigo	Submission (arm-triangle choke)	Face to Face 2	October 31, 2009	2	N/A	Recreio dos Bandeirantes, Rio de Janeiro, Brazil	
Win	19–2	Mario Sartori	TKO (doctor stoppage)	Real Fight 7	October 3, 2009	1	2:40	São José dos Campos, São Paulo, Brazil	
Loss	18–2	Carlos Alexandre Pereira	TKO (head kick and punches)	Shooto: Brazil 13	August 27, 2009	2	4:27	Fortaleza, Ceará, Brazil	
Win	18–1	Pedro Paulo dos Santos	Submission (arm-triangle choke)	Face to Face	June 6, 2009	1	N/A	Recreio dos Bandeirantes, Rio de Janeiro, Brazil	
Win	17–1	Felipe Arinelli	Decision (split)	World Fighting Combat	April 24, 2009	3	5:00	Camboinhas, Niterói, Brazil	
Win	16–1	Vitor Pimenta	TKO (punches)	The Warriors	March 29, 2009	1	N/A	Barra da Tijuca, Rio de Janeiro, Brazil	
Win	15–1	Antonio Silva	Submission (anaconda choke)	Chatuba Fight 2	February 6, 2009	1	2:30	Rio de Janeiro, Brazil	
Win	14–1	Gustavo Rosa	Submission (rear-naked choke)	Best Fighters	February 1, 2009	2	N/A	Barra da Tijuca, Rio de Janeiro, Brazil	
Win	13–1	Leonardo Jacare	Decision (unanimous)	Kawai Arena 1	December 13, 2008	3	5:00	São José dos Campos, São Paulo, Brazil	
Win	12–1	Dinarte Silva	Submission (anaconda choke)	Shooto: Brazil 9	November 29, 2008	1	1:57	Fortaleza, Ceará, Brazil	
Win	11–1	Eduardo Pereira	Submission (anaconda choke)	Juiz de Fora: Fight 6	November 8, 2008	N/A	N/A	Brazil	
Win	10–1	Julio Cabral	Decision (unanimous)	Win Fight and Entertainment 1	September 28, 2008	3	5:00	Salvador, Bahia, Brazil	
Win	9–1	Pedro Santos	Submission (arm-triangle choke)	Watch Out Combat Show 1	May 10, 2008	3	N/A	Barra da Tijuca, Rio de Janeiro, Brazil	
Win	8–1	Geno Vitale-Sansoti	Submission (anaconda choke)	Real Fight 5	April 13, 2008	1	N/A	São José dos Campos, São Paulo, Brazil	
Win	7–1	Vinicius Bohrer	Submission (anaconda choke)	Juiz de Fora: Fight 5	November 24, 2007	3	N/A	Brazil	
Win	6–1	Iberico El Toro	Submission (arm-triangle choke)	MMA Sports Combat 1	October 27, 2007	1	N/A	Rio das Ostras, Rio de Janeiro, Brazil	
Loss	5–1	Sérgio Moraes	Submission (triangle choke)	Mo Team League 2	September 29, 2007	1	2:07	São Paulo, Brazil	
Win	5–0	Rafael Freitas	Submission (anaconda choke)	Top Fighting Championships 3	May 2, 2007	N/A	N/A	Rio de Janeiro, Brazil	
Win	4–0	Ismael de Jesus	Decision (unanimous)	Top Fighting Championships 3	May 2, 2007	3	5:00	Rio de Janeiro, Brazil	
Win	3–0	Adriano Verdelli	Submission (anaconda choke)	Max Fight 3	April 28, 2007	1	0:28	São Paulo, Brazil	
Win	2–0	Diego Castro	Decision (unanimous)	Shooto: Brazil 2	March 24, 2007	3	5:00	Flamengo, Rio de Janeiro, Brazil	
Win	1–0	Emerson Ferreira	Submission (anaconda choke)	Shooto Brazil 1: The Return	December 3, 2006	2	4:20	Flamengo, Rio de Janeiro, Brazil	
