= List of Bellator MMA records =

Below is a list of records held in Bellator MMA. Records are final: Bellator was acquired by the Professional Fighters League in November 2023, and the Bellator brand was discontinued after its roster was merged into the PFL in 2025.

== Fighting ==
=== Most bouts ===
==== In any bout ====
===== All fighters =====
Patrício Pitbull competed in a record 30 Bellator bouts.

**B**	Active fighters in bold

	Fighter	Division	Bouts
1.	(Brazil) **Patrício Pitbull**	Featherweight; Lightweight	30
2.	(Brazil) **Patricky Pitbull**	Lightweight	25
3.	(United States) **Saad Awad**	Lightweight; Catchweight; Welterweight	24
4.	(United States) David Rickels	Catchweight; Welterweight; Lightweight	23
4.	(United States) Michael Chandler	Lightweight; Catchweight; Welterweight	23
6.	(Brazil) **Douglas Lima**	Welterweight; Middleweight; Catchweight	21
6.	(Russia) **Georgi Karakhanyan**	Lightweight; Featherweight; Catchweight	21
6.	(United States) **A. J. McKee**	Featherweight; Lightweight	21

===== By division =====
Weight Class	Fighter	Fights
Heavyweight	(France) **Cheick Kongo**	18
Light Heavyweight	(United States) **Phil Davis**	16
Middleweight	(Russia) Alexander Shlemenko	17
Welterweight	(Russia) **Andrey Koreshkov**	19
Lightweight	(Brazil) **Patricky Pitbull**	23
Featherweight	(Brazil) **Patrício Pitbull**	28
Bantamweight	(United States) Joe Warren	15
Women's Featherweight	(Australia) **Arlene Blencowe**	15
Women's Flyweight	(United States) **Ilima-Lei Macfarlane**	14
Women's Strawweight	(United States) Jessica Aguilar	6

==== In a title bout ====
===== All fighters =====
	Fighter	Division	Wins	Losses	Draws	NC	Total
1.	(Brazil) **Patricio Pitbull**	Featherweight; Lightweight; Bantamweight	14	4	0	0	18
2.	(United States) Michael Chandler	Lightweight	6	5	0	0	11
3.	(Brazil) **Douglas Lima**	Welterweight; Middleweight	4	5	0	0	9
4.	**(United States) Ryan Bader**	Heavyweight; Light Heavyweight	6	1	0	1	8
5.	(United States) Pat Curran	Featherweight; Lightweight	4	3	0	0	7
5.	(Brazil) Eduardo Dantas	Bantamweight	5	2	0	0	7
5.	(Netherlands) **Gegard Mousasi**	Middleweight	5	2	0	0	7
8.	(United States) **Ilima-Lei Macfarlane**	Women's Flyweight	5	1	0	0	6
8.	(Russia) Vadim Nemkov	Light Heavyweight	5	0	0	1	6
8.	(United States) Joe Warren	Bantamweight; Featherweight	3	3	0	0	6
8.	(Russia) Alexander Shlemenko	Middleweight	4	2	0	0	6

===== By division =====
Division	Fighter	Bouts
Heavyweight	(United States) **Ryan Bader**	5
Light Heavyweight	(Russia) Vadim Nemkov	6
Middleweight	**(Netherlands) Gegard Mousasi**	7
Welterweight	(Brazil) **Douglas Lima**	8
Lightweight	(United States) Michael Chandler	11
Featherweight	(Brazil) **Patricio Pitbull**	14
Bantamweight	(Brazil) Eduardo Dantas	7
Women's Featherweight	**(Brazil) Cris Cyborg**	6
Women's Flyweight	(United States) **Ilima-Lei Macfarlane**	6
Women's Strawweight	(United States) Zoila Gurgel	1
Women's Strawweight	(Japan) Megumi Fujii	1

== Winning ==
=== Most wins ===
==== In any bout ====
===== All fighters =====
Patrício Pitbull holds the record for the most wins in Bellator history, with 24.

	Fighter	Division	Wins
1.	(Brazil) Patrício Pitbull	Featherweight; Lightweight	24
2.	(United States) A.J. McKee	Featherweight	20
3.	(United States) Michael Chandler	Lightweight; Catchweight; Welterweight	18
4.	(England) Michael Page	Welterweight; Catchweight	17
5.	(Brazil) Patricky Pitbull	Lightweight	16
6.	(United States) David Rickels	Welterweight; Catchweight; Lightweight	15
7.	(Brazil) Douglas Lima	Welterweight; Catchweight	14

===== By division =====
Fighter	Weight Class	Wins
(France) Cheick Kongo	Heavyweight	13
(United States) Phil Davis	Light Heavyweight	11
(Russia) Alexander Shlemenko	Middleweight	12
(Russia) Andrey Koreshkov	Welterweight	16
(Brazil) Patricky Pitbull	Lightweight	16
(Brazil) Patrício Pitbull	Featherweight	22
(Brazil) Eduardo Dantas	Bantamweight	10
(Canada) Julia Budd	Women's Featherweight	9
(United States) Ilima-Lei Macfarlane	Women's Flyweight	11
(United States) Jessica Aguilar	Women's Strawweight	5

==== In a title bout ====
===== All fighters =====
	Fighter	Division	Wins
1.	(Brazil) Patricio Pitbull	Featherweight; Lightweight	13
2.	(United States) Michael Chandler	Lightweight	6
2.	(Brazil) Cris Cyborg	Women's Featherweight	6
2.	(United States) Ryan Bader	Heavyweight; Light Heavyweight	6
5.	(United States) Ilima-Lei Macfarlane	Women's Flyweight	5
5.	(Netherlands) Gegard Mousasi	Middleweight	5
5.	(Russia) Vadim Nemkov	Light Heavyweight	5
5.	(United States) Ben Askren	Welterweight	5
5.	(Brazil) Eduardo Dantas	Bantamweight	5
10.	(Brazil) Rafael Carvalho	Middleweight	4
10.	(Brazil) Douglas Lima	Welterweight	4
10.	(United States) Liz Carmouche	Women's Flyweight	4
10.	(United States) Pat Curran	Featherweight	4
10.	(Russia) Alexander Shlemenko	Middleweight	4
10.	(United States) Emanuel Newton	Light Heavyweight	4
10.	(United States) Will Brooks	Lightweight	4
10.	(Canada) Julia Budd	Women's Featherweight	4

===== By division =====
Division	Fighter	Wins
Heavyweight	(United States) Ryan Bader	4
Light Heavyweight	(Russia) Vadim Nemkov	5
Middleweight	(Netherlands) Gegard Mousasi	5
Welterweight	(United States) Ben Askren	5
Lightweight	(United States) Michael Chandler	6
Featherweight	(Brazil) Patricio Pitbull	10
Bantamweight	(Brazil) Eduardo Dantas	5
Women's Featherweight	(Brazil) Cris Cyborg	6
Women's flyweight	(United States) Ilima-Lei Macfarlane	5
Women's Strawweight	(United States) Zoila Gurgel	1

=== Longest winning streaks ===
A. J. McKee holds the longest winning streak in Bellator history at 18 consecutive victories, beginning with his 2015 debut and ending with his loss to Patrício Pitbull at Bellator 277 in April 2022.

	Fighter	Division	Began	Ended	Winning streak
1.	(United States) A. J. McKee	Featherweight	Apr 10, 2015	Apr 15, 2022	18
2.	(England) Michael Page	Welterweight	Mar 21, 2013	May 11, 2019	10
2.	(United States) Ilima-Lei Macfarlane	Women's Flyweight	Aug 28, 2015	Dec 10, 2020	10
3.	(United States) Ben Askren	Welterweight	Apr 15, 2010	Nov 14, 2013	9
3.	(United States) Michael Chandler	Lightweight; Catchweight	Sept 30, 2010	Jul 31, 2013	9
4.	(United States) Joey Davis	Welterweight; Catchweight	Aug 26, 2016	Mar 31, 2023	8
4.	(Cuba) Hector Lombard	Middleweight	Apr 17, 2009	Nov 19, 2011	8
4.	(Russia) Alexander Shlemenko	Middleweight	May 14, 2011	Mar 28, 2014	8
4.	(England) Liam McGeary	Light Heavyweight	Apr 4, 2013	Sept 19, 2015	8
4.	(United States) Will Brooks	Lightweight	Jul 31, 2013	Nov 6, 2015	8
4.	(France) Cheick Kongo	Heavyweight	Jun 26, 2015	Sept 7, 2019	8
4.	(United States) Tyrell Fortune	Heavyweight	Nov 4, 2016	Feb 21, 2020	8

== Championships ==
=== Most title reigns ===
Patrício Pitbull is the only four-time Bellator world champion, having won the featherweight title three times and the lightweight title once. Michael Chandler won the lightweight title three times.

	Fighter	Division	Undisputed	Interim	Total Reign
1.	(Brazil) **Patricio Pitbull**	Featherweight; Lightweight	4	0	4
2.	(United States) Michael Chandler	Lightweight	3	0	3
2.	(Brazil) Douglas Lima	Welterweight	3	0	3
2.	(United States) Joe Warren	Bantamweight; Featherweight	2	1	3
5.	(United States) **Ryan Bader**	Heavyweight; Light Heavyweight	2	0	2
5.	(Netherlands) **Gegard Mousasi**	Middleweight	2	0	2
5.	(United States) Eddie Alvarez	Lightweight	2	0	2
5.	(United States) Pat Curran	Featherweight	2	0	2
5.	(United States) Daniel Straus	Featherweight	2	0	2
5.	(Brazil) Eduardo Dantas	Bantamweight	2	0	2
5.	(United States) Emanuel Newton	Light Heavyweight	1	1	2
5.	(United States) Will Brooks	Lightweight	1	1	2

- **Bold** – Active reign.

=== Most single reign title defenses ===
Patrício Pitbull and Cris Cyborg share the record for most consecutive title defenses in a single reign with five; Cyborg's fifth defense came against Cat Zingano at Bellator 300 in October 2023.

	Fighter	Division	Defenses
1.	**(Brazil) Patricio Pitbull**	Featherweight	5
1.	**(Brazil) Cris Cyborg**	Women's Featherweight	5
3.	(United States) Ben Askren	Welterweight	4
3.	(United States) Ilima-Lei Macfarlane	Women's Flyweight	4
3.	(Russia) Vadim Nemkov	Light Heavyweight	4
6.	**(United States) Ryan Bader**	Heavyweight	3
6.	**(United States) Liz Carmouche**	Women's Flyweight	3
6.	(Russia) Alexander Shlemenko	Middleweight	3
6.	(Brazil) Rafael Carvalho	Middleweight	3
6.	(Canada) Julia Budd	Women's Featherweight	3

- **Bold** – Active reign.

==== By division ====
Division	Fighter	Defenses
Heavyweight	(United States) **Ryan Bader**	3
Light Heavyweight	(Russia) Vadim Nemkov	4
Middleweight	(Brazil) Rafael Carvalho	3
Middleweight	(Russia) Alexander Shlemenko	3
Welterweight	(United States) Ben Askren	4
Lightweight	(United States) Michael Chandler	2
Lightweight	(United States) Will Brooks	2
Featherweight	**(Brazil) Patricio Pitbull**	5
Bantamweight	(Brazil) Eduardo Dantas	2
Bantamweight	(United States) Sergio Pettis	2
Women's Featherweight	**(Brazil) Cris Cyborg**	5
Women's Flyweight	(United States) Ilima-Lei Macfarlane	4

- **Bold** – Active reign.

=== Most combined reign title defenses ===
Patrício Pitbull made nine successful defenses of the Bellator featherweight title across his three reigns, the ninth against Jeremy Kennedy at Bellator Champions Series Belfast in March 2024.

	Fighter	Division	No. of reigns	Defenses
1.	**(Brazil) Patricio Pitbull**	Featherweight	3	9
2.	**(Brazil) Cris Cyborg**	Women's Featherweight	1	5
4.	(United States) **Ryan Bader**	Heavyweight; Light Heavyweight	2	4
4.	(United States) Ben Askren	Welterweight	1	4
4.	(United States) Ilima-Lei Macfarlane	Women's Flyweight	1	4
4.	(Russia) Vadim Nemkov	Light Heavyweight	1	4
7.	**(United States) Liz Carmouche**	Women's Flyweight	1	3
7.	(Russia) Alexander Shlemenko	Middleweight	1	3
7.	(Brazil) Rafael Carvalho	Middleweight	1	3
7.	(Canada) Julia Budd	Women's Featherweight	1	3
7.	**(Netherlands) Gegard Mousasi**	Middleweight	2	3
7.	(United States) Michael Chandler	Lightweight	2	3
7.	(Brazil) Eduardo Dantas	Bantamweight	2	3

- **Bold** – Active reign.

==== By division ====
Division	Fighter	No. of reigns	Defenses
Heavyweight	(United States) **Ryan Bader**	1	3
Light Heavyweight	(Russia) Vadim Nemkov	1	4
Middleweight	(Brazil) Rafael Carvalho	1	3
Middleweight	(Russia) Alexander Shlemenko	1	3
Middleweight	**(Netherlands) Gegard Mousasi**	2	3
Welterweight	(United States) Ben Askren	1	4
Lightweight	(United States) Michael Chandler	2	3
Featherweight	**(Brazil) Patricio Pitbull**	3	9
Bantamweight	(Brazil) Eduardo Dantas	2	3
Women's Featherweight	**(Brazil) Cris Cyborg**	1	5
Women's Flyweight	(United States) Ilima-Lei Macfarlane	1	4

- **Bold** – Active reign.

=== Multi-division champions ===
Fighters who have won championships in multiple weight classes.

Joe Warren is the first champion to hold belts in two different divisions and Ryan Bader is the first fighter to hold multiple titles simultaneously, having held the light heavyweight and heavyweight titles at the same time; Bader remained heavyweight champion until the Bellator brand was discontinued following its acquisition by the Professional Fighters League.

Champion	Division	Won	Lost	Defenses	Reign	Total reign
(United States) Joe Warren	Featherweight	Sept 2, 2010 (Bellator 27)	Mar 9, 2012 (Bellator 60)	0	554 days	722 days
(United States) Joe Warren	Bantamweight	Oct 10, 2014 (Bellator 128)	Mar 27, 2015 (Bellator 135)	0	168 days	722 days
**(United States) Ryan Bader**	Light Heavyweight	Jun 24, 2017 (Bellator 180)	Aug 21, 2020 (Bellator 244)	1	1155 days	3886 days
**(United States) Ryan Bader**	Heavyweight	Jan 26, 2019 (Bellator 214)	Final champion	1	2731 days	3886 days
**(Brazil) Patricio Pitbull**	Featherweight	Sept 5, 2014 (Bellator 123)	Nov 6, 2015 (Bellator 145)	2	428 days	4443 days
**(Brazil) Patricio Pitbull**	Featherweight	Apr 21, 2017 (Bellator 178)	Jul 31, 2021 (Bellator 263)	5	1582 days	4443 days
**(Brazil) Patricio Pitbull**	Featherweight	Apr 15, 2022 (Bellator 277)	Final champion	2	1556 days	4443 days
**(Brazil) Patricio Pitbull**	Lightweight	May 11, 2019 (Bellator 221)	Oct 6, 2021 (vacated)	0	877 days	4443 days

- **Bold** – Active reign.

== Fastest finishes ==
=== Fastest knockouts ===
Three fighters share the record for the fastest knockout in Bellator history, at six seconds.

	Fighter	Opponent	Time	Event	Date
1.	(Cuba) Héctor Lombard	Jay Silva	0:06	Bellator 18	May 13, 2010
1.	(Italy) Michele Martignoni	Simone D'Anna	0:06	Bellator 203	July 14, 2018
1.	(United States) Mike Kimbel	Alex Potts	0:06	Bellator 207	October 12, 2018

=== Fastest submissions ===
	Fighter	Opponent	Method	Time	Event	Date
1.	(Israel) Aviv Gozali	Eduard Muravitsky	Heel hook	0:11	Bellator 225	August 24, 2019
2.	(United States) Aaron "Tex" Johnson	Brennan Ward	Armbar	0:15	Bellator 89	February 14, 2013
3.	(United States) Dave Vitkay	Jesse Peterson	Guillotine choke	0:18	Bellator 93	March 21, 2013
4.	(United States) Joe Hamilton	Tyler Freeland	Rear-naked choke	0:22	Bellator 155	May 20, 2016
5.	(United States) Zach Freeman	Aaron Pico	Guillotine choke	0:24	Bellator 180	June 24, 2017

== See also ==
- Bellator MMA
- List of Bellator MMA events
- List of Bellator MMA champions
- List of current Bellator fighters
- List of Bellator MMA alumni
