= David Rickels =

American mixed martial arts fighter

- Born: January 5, 1989 (age 37); Derby, Kansas, United States
- Other names: The Caveman
- Height: 6 ft 0 in (1.83 m)
- Weight: 175 lb (79 kg; 12.5 st)
- Division: Welterweight; Lightweight
- Reach: 72 in (183 cm)
- Fighting out of: Wichita, Kansas, United States
- Team: Janjira Muay Thai
- Years active: 2010–present

Mixed martial arts record
- Total: 29
- Wins: 21
- By knockout: 7
- By submission: 6
- By decision: 8
- Losses: 6
- By knockout: 4
- By submission: 1
- By decision: 1
- No contests: 2

Other information
- Mixed martial arts record from Sherdog

David Rickels (born January 5, 1989) is an American professional mixed martial artist and bare-knuckle fighter who is currently competing in the Bare Knuckle Fighting Championship. A professional since 2010, he is a 23-fight veteran of the Bellator MMA, and won the Season Eight Lightweight Tournament.

== Background ==
Rickels was born and raised in Derby, Kansas, a 2007 graduate of Derby High School where he competed in wrestling. He then went on to attend Butler Community College. Started his own promotion called Evolution Fighting Championship in late 2015.

== Mixed martial arts career ==
=== Early career ===
Rickels compiled an amateur record of 8-1, and made his professional mixed martial arts debut in February 2010. He won via first-round TKO and went on to compile an undefeated record of 5-0 before being signed by Bellator.

=== Bellator MMA ===
Rickels made his Bellator debut on April 9, 2011, at Bellator 40 where he defeated formerly undefeated Dylan Smith by a first-round triangle choke submission.

Rickels next fought Strikeforce veteran Richard Bouphanouvong on May 7, 2011, at Bellator 43 where he won by triangle choke in round 2.

After defeating Levi Avera with a third-straight win by triangle choke in Bellator in 2011, Rickels was featured in the Bellator Season 6 Welterweight Tournament in 2012. He faced Jordan Smith in the opening round of the tournament at Bellator 63 and won via KO at just 22 seconds into the first round. In the semifinals at Bellator 69, Rickels faced Karl Amoussou. The bout was back-and-forth but in the end, Amoussou won the fight via controversial split decision, giving Rickels his first professional loss.

Rickels returned to face Jason Fischer at Bellator 82. He won via unanimous decision.

Rickels was picked to enter the Lightweight Season 8 Tournament where he defeated Lloyd Woodard in the quarterfinals at Bellator 87 via unanimous decision. Rickels was to face Russian prospect Alexander Sarnavskiy, but Sarnavskiy fractured his hand during his first fight and had to withdraw from the tournament. Rickels instead faced Jason Fischer in a rematch and won via unanimous decision. In the finals at Bellator 94, Rickels took on Saad Awad. He dropped Awad with a right hand at the very end of the second round, but Awad remained resting on his back instead of getting up to his corner, resulting in the referee declaring an end to the match, controversially making Rickels the winner by TKO.

With the tournament win, Rickels faced undefeated 11-0 Bellator Lightweight Champion Michael Chandler at Bellator 97. He lost the fight via knockout at just 44 seconds into the first round.

In March 2014, Rickels entered into the Bellator season 10 lightweight tournament, where he faced Patricky Pitbull in the opening round at Bellator 113. He lost the fight via knockout in the second round.

Rickels faced Davi Ramos on October 24, 2014, at Bellator 130. He won the fight via unanimous decision.

Rickels faced John Alessio at Bellator 139 on June 26, 2015. Rickels almost finished Alessio in the first round, but an unintentional illegal knee from Rickels landed on Alessio's head when he was down and prompted the referee to stop the fight. Alessio couldn't continue and the fight was overturned to a no contest.

Rickels had a rematch with Michael Chandler on November 6, 2015, at Bellator 145. He lost the fight via TKO in the second round.

Rickels faced Melvin Guillard on July 21, 2016, at Bellator 159. He lost the fight via knockout in the first round. However, the loss was overturned to a No-Contest after Guillard tested positive for a non-performance-enhancing banned substance.

Rickels faced Aaron Derrow at Bellator 171 on January 27, 2017. He won the fight via TKO, due to punches in the third round.

Rickels was expected to face Brennan Ward at Bellator 185 on October 20, 2017, however, an injury to Ward forced him out of the bout, and Rickels was removed from the fight card as a result.

After an injury to Derek Anderson, Rickels stepped in as a replacement to face Adam Piccolotti at Bellator 189 on December 1, 2017. He won the 160 lb catchweight fight by unanimous decision.

Rickels faced Michael Page on May 25, 2018, at Bellator 200. He lost the fight via verbal submission due to a punch in the second round.

After his 23rd fight in Bellator on August 24, 2019, Rickels became a free agent.

== Bare-knuckle boxing ==
On January 23, 2020, news surfaced that Rickels had signed with Bare Knuckle Fighting Championship. He was expected to make his promotional debut on March 14, 2020 with opponent to be determined, but the event was cancelled. Instead, Rickels made his debut on October 10, 2020, defeating Cliff Wright by decision.

== Championships and accomplishments ==
- Bellator Fighting Championships
  - Bellator Season 8 Lightweight Tournament Championship
  - Tied (with Michael Chandler) for fourth most fights in Bellator History (23)
  - Most wins of non-champ in Bellator history (14)

== Mixed martial arts record ==
Professional record breakdown
29 matches	21 wins	6 losses
By knockout	7	4
By submission	6	1
By decision	8	1
No contests	2	

Res.	Record	Opponent	Method	Event	Date	Round	Time	Location	Notes
Loss	21–6 (2)	Yaroslav Amosov	Submission (D'Arce choke)	Bellator 225	August 24, 2019	2	4:05	Bridgeport, Connecticut, United States	Catchweight (175 lbs) bout.
Win	21–5 (2)	A.J. Matthews	TKO (punch)	Bellator 219	March 29, 2019	2	3:24	Temecula, California, United States	
Win	20–5 (2)	Guilherme Vasconcelos	Decision (unanimous)	Bellator 210	November 30, 2018	3	5:00	Thackerville, Oklahoma, United States	
Loss	19–5 (2)	Michael Page	TKO (retirement)	Bellator 200	25 May 2018	2	0:43	London, United Kingdom	
Win	19–4 (2)	Adam Piccolotti	Decision (unanimous)	Bellator 189	December 1, 2017	3	5:00	Thackerville, Oklahoma, United States	Catchweight (160 lbs) bout.
Win	18–4 (2)	Aaron Derrow	TKO (punches)	Bellator 171	January 27, 2017	3	0:44	Mulvane, Kansas, United States	Return to Welterweight.
NC	17–4 (2)	Melvin Guillard	NC (overturned)	Bellator 159	July 22, 2016	1	2:14	Mulvane, Kansas, United States	Originally KO loss; Overturned to a no contest when Guillard tested positive for a banned substance.
Win	17–4 (1)	Bobby Cooper	TKO (knee and punches)	Bellator 150	February 26, 2016	1	3:49	Mulvane, Kansas, United States	
Loss	16–4 (1)	Michael Chandler	TKO (punches)	Bellator 145	November 6, 2015	2	3:05	St. Louis, Missouri, United States	
NC	16–3 (1)	John Alessio	NC (illegal knee)	Bellator 139	June 26, 2015	1	2:24	Mulvane, Kansas, United States	
Win	16–3	Davi Ramos	Decision (unanimous)	Bellator 130	October 24, 2014	3	5:00	Mulvane, Kansas, United States	
Loss	15–3	Patricky Pitbull	KO (punches)	Bellator 113	March 21, 2014	2	0:54	Mulvane, Kansas, United States	Bellator Season 10 Lightweight Tournament Quarterfinal.
Win	15–2	J.J. Ambrose	TKO (punches)	Bellator 103	October 11, 2013	3	2:37	Mulvane, Kansas, United States	
Loss	14–2	Michael Chandler	KO (punches)	Bellator 97	July 31, 2013	1	0:44	Rio Rancho, New Mexico, United States	For the Bellator Lightweight World Championship.
Win	14–1	Saad Awad	TKO (punches)	Bellator 94	March 28, 2013	2	5:00	Tampa, Florida, United States	Won the Bellator Season Eight Lightweight Tournament.
Win	13–1	Jason Fischer	Decision (unanimous)	Bellator 91	February 28, 2013	3	5:00	Rio Rancho, New Mexico, United States	Bellator Season Eight Lightweight Tournament Semifinal.
Win	12–1	Lloyd Woodard	Decision (unanimous)	Bellator 87	January 31, 2013	3	5:00	Mount Pleasant, Michigan, United States	Lightweight debut; Bellator Season Eight Lightweight Tournament Quarterfinal.
Win	11–1	Jason Fischer	Decision (unanimous)	Bellator 82	November 30, 2012	3	5:00	Mount Pleasant, Michigan, United States	Catchweight (160 lbs) bout.
Loss	10–1	Karl Amoussou	Decision (split)	Bellator 69	May 18, 2012	3	5:00	Lake Charles, Louisiana, United States	Bellator Season Six Welterweight Tournament Semifinal.
Win	10–0	Jordan Smith	KO (punches)	Bellator 63	March 30, 2012	1	0:22	Uncasville, Connecticut, United States	Bellator Season Six Welterweight Tournament Quarterfinal.
Win	9–0	Levi Avera	Submission (triangle choke)	Bellator 53	October 8, 2011	2	1:06	Miami, Oklahoma, United States	
Win	8–0	Kody Frank	Decision (unanimous)	SKC: Hotter than Hell Fight Night	July 16, 2011	3	5:00	Wichita, Kansas, United States	
Win	7–0	Richard Bouphanouvong	Submission (triangle choke)	Bellator 43	May 7, 2011	2	1:11	Newkirk, Oklahoma, United States	Catchweight (179 lbs) bout.
Win	6–0	Dylan Smith	Submission (triangle choke)	Bellator 40	April 9, 2011	1	3:32	Newkirk, Oklahoma, United States	
Win	5–0	Aaron Fondry	Decision (split)	Friday Night Fights New England: Burlington	February 25, 2011	3	5:00	Burlington, Vermont, United States	
Win	4–0	Charles Jones	Submission (triangle choke)	C3 Fights: Slammin Jammin Weekend 6	October 22, 2010	2	2:19	Newkirk, Oklahoma, United States	
Win	3–0	Kelly Allen	Submission (triangle choke)	Eye Win: Showtime	August 14, 2010	1	3:31	Wichita, Kansas, United States	
Win	2–0	Michael Glenn	Submission (armbar)	Eye Win: Devastation	June 19, 2010	1	2:15	Wichita, Kansas, United States	
Win	1–0	Chris Evinger	TKO (knees and punches)	Eye Win: Valentine's Day Massacre	February 13, 2010	1	2:40	Wichita, Kansas, United States	

== Bare knuckle record ==
Professional record breakdown
3 matches	2 wins	1 loss
By knockout	0	1
By decision	2	0
Draws	0	

Res.	Record	Opponent	Method	Event	Date	Round	Time	Location	Notes
Loss	2–1	Mike Richman	KO (punch)	BKFC 23	April 8, 2022	2	0:32	Wichita, Kansas, United States	
Win	2–0	Julian Lane	Decision (unanimous)	BKFC Fight Night Wichita: Rickels vs. Lane	October 23, 2021	5	2:00	Wichita, Kansas, United States	
Win	1–0	Cliff Wright	Decision (unanimous)	BKFC 13	October 10, 2020	5	2:00	Salina, Kansas, United States	
