= Evolution Fighting Championship =

MMA promoter based in Witchita, Kansas

Evolution Fighting Championship is an American Kickboxing and mixed martial arts (MMA) promotion based in Wichita, Kansas. Evolution Fighting Championship was founded in 2015, by American professional mixed martial artist and bare-knuckle fighter David Rickels.
