= 2022 in Bellator MMA =

Mixed martial arts events

Information
- Promotion: Bellator MMA
- First date: January 29, 2022
- Last date: December 31, 2022

Events
- Total events: 18

Fights
- Total fights: 228
- Title fights: 15

2022 in Bellator MMA was the fourteenth year in the history of Bellator MMA, a mixed martial arts promotion based in the United States.

== Events list ==
#	Event	Date	Venue	City	Country	Ref.
18	Bellator MMA vs. Rizin	December 31, 2022	Saitama Super Arena	Saitama	Japan	
17	Bellator 289: Stots vs. Sabatello	December 9, 2022	Mohegan Sun Arena	Uncasville, Connecticut	U.S.	
16	Bellator 288: Nemkov vs. Anderson 2	November 18, 2022	Wintrust Arena	Chicago, Illinois	U.S.	
15	Bellator 287: Piccolotti vs. Barnaoui	October 29, 2022	Allianz Cloud	Milan	Italy	
14	Bellator 286: Pitbull vs. Borics	October 1, 2022	Long Beach Arena	Long Beach, California	U.S.	
13	Bellator 285: Henderson vs. Queally	September 23, 2022	3Arena	Dublin	Ireland	
12	Bellator 284: Gracie vs. Yamauchi	August 12, 2022	Sanford Pentagon	Sioux Falls, South Dakota	U.S.	
11	Bellator 283: Lima vs. Jackson	July 22, 2022	Emerald Queen Casino and Hotel	Tacoma, Washington	U.S.	
10	Bellator 282: Mousasi vs. Eblen	June 24, 2022	Mohegan Sun Arena	Uncasville, Connecticut	U.S.	
9	Bellator 281: MVP vs. Storley	May 13, 2022	SSE Arena	London	England	
8	Bellator 280: Bader vs. Kongo	May 6, 2022	AccorHotels Arena	Paris	France	
7	Bellator 279: Cyborg vs. Blencowe 2	April 23, 2022	Neal S. Blaisdell Arena	Honolulu, Hawaii	U.S.	
6	Bellator 278: Velasquez vs. Carmouche	April 22, 2022	Neal S. Blaisdell Arena	Honolulu, Hawaii	U.S.	
5	Bellator 277: McKee vs. Pitbull 2	April 15, 2022	SAP Center	San Jose, California	U.S.	
4	Bellator 276: Borics vs. Burnell	March 12, 2022	Family Arena	St. Louis, Missouri	U.S.	
3	Bellator 275: Mousasi vs. Vanderford	February 25, 2022	3Arena	Dublin	Ireland	
2	Bellator 274: Gracie vs. Storley	February 19, 2022	Mohegan Sun Arena	Uncasville, Connecticut	U.S.	
1	Bellator 273: Bader vs. Moldavsky	January 29, 2022	Footprint Center	Phoenix, Arizona	U.S.	

== Bellator Light Heavyweight World Grand Prix Tournament ==
Quarter-finals
(Russia) Vadim Nemkov (c)	UD
(United States) Phil Davis	5
(United States) Anthony Johnson	KO
(Brazil) Jose Augusto	2
(United States) Corey Anderson	TKO
(Turkmenistan) Dovletdzhan Yagshimuradov	3
(United States) Ryan Bader	UD
(Brazil) Lyoto Machida	5

Semi-finals
(Russia) Vadim Nemkov (c)	SUB
(Lithuania) Julius Anglickas (Note: Julius Anglickas replaced an injured Anthony Johnson.)	4
(United States) Corey Anderson	TKO
(United States) Ryan Bader	1

Final
(Russia) Vadim Nemkov (c)	UD
(United States) Corey Anderson	5 (Note: Original final match was held at Bellator 277 and ended in a No Contest; A rematch final took place November 18, 2022 at Bellator 288.)

== Bellator Bantamweight World Grand Prix Tournament ==
The eight participants of the tournament were revealed on December 3, 2021. They include current champion Sergio Pettis, the former Rizin and Bellator champion Kyoji Horiguchi, another former Bellator champion in Juan Archuleta, who captured the vacant bantamweight title in 2020 against Patchy Mix, who will also be in the tournament. The final four fighters in the Grand Prix are all ranked in the top six by Bellator at 135 pounds: Magomed Magomedov, James Gallagher, Raufeon Stots and Leandro Higo. Pettis and Gallagher would eventually pull out due to injuries requiring surgery. Due to the pull outs, two wild card qualifier bouts between Josh Hill and Enrique Barzola, with the winner meeting Magomed Magomedov in the opening round, and the second qualifier between Jornel Lugo and Danny Sabatello, which will have the winner face Leandro Higo in the first round of the tournament. Due to Covid, Hill had to pull out of the bout and was replaced by Nikita Mikhailov.

Wild Cards
(United States) Danny Sabatello	UD
(United States) Jornel Lugo	3
(Peru) Enrique Barzola	UD
(Russia) Nikita Mikhailov	3

Quarter-finals
(United States) Juan Archuleta	3
(United States) Raufeon Stots	KO
(Brazil) Leandro Higo	5
(United States) Danny Sabatello	UD
(Russia) Magomed Magomedov	SUB
(Peru) Enrique Barzola	4
(United States) Patchy Mix	UD
(Japan) Kyoji Horiguchi	5

Semi-finals
(United States) Raufeon Stots (ic)	SD
(United States) Danny Sabatello	5
(Russia) Magomed Magomedov	2
(United States) Patchy Mix	SUB

Final
(United States) Raufeon Stots (ic)	1
(United States) Patchy Mix	KO

== Title fights ==
Title fights in 2022
Weight class				Method	Round	Time	Event	Notes
Heavyweight	Ryan Bader (c)	def.	Valentin Moldavsky (ic)	Decision (unanimous) (48–47, 48–47, 48–47)	5	5:00	Bellator 273	(Note: For the Bellator Heavyweight World Championship.)
Middleweight	Gegard Mousasi (c)	def.	Austin Vanderford	TKO (punches)	1	1:25	Bellator 275	(Note: For the Bellator Middleweight World Championship.)
Light Heavyweight	Vadim Nemkov (c)	vs.	Corey Anderson	No Contest (accidental clash of heads)	3	4:55	Bellator 277	(Note: For the Bellator Light Heavyweight World Championship)
Featherweight	Patrício Pitbull	def.	A. J. McKee (c)	Decision (unanimous) (49–46, 48–47, 48–47)	5	5:00	Bellator 277	(Note: For the Bellator Featherweight World Championship)
Women's Flyweight	Liz Carmouche	def.	Juliana Velasquez (c)	TKO (elbows)	4	4:47	Bellator 278	(Note: For the Bellator Women's Flyweight World Championship.)
Bantamweight	Raufeon Stots	def.	Juan Archuleta	KO (head kick and elbows)	3	0:16	Bellator 279	(Note: For the interim Bellator Bantamweight World Championship)
Women's Featherweight	Cris Cyborg (c)	def.	Arlene Blencowe	Decision (unanimous) (49–45, 49–45, 49–45)	5	5:00	Bellator 279	(Note: For the Bellator Women's Featherweight World Championship.)
Heavyweight	Ryan Bader (c)	def.	Cheick Kongo	Decision (unanimous) (50–45, 50–45, 50–45)	5	5:00	Bellator 280	(Note: For the Bellator Heavyweight World Championship.)
Welterweight	Logan Storley	def.	Michael Page	Decision (split) (48–47, 47–48, 49–46)	5	5:00	Bellator 281	(Note: For the Bellator Welterweight World Championship)
Middleweight	Johnny Eblen	def.	Gegard Mousasi (c)	Decision (unanimous) (50–45, 50–45, 50–45)	5	5:00	Bellator 282	(Note: For the Bellator Middleweight World Championship)
Featherweight	Patrício Pitbull (c)	def.	Ádám Borics	Decision (unanimous) (48–47, 49–46, 50–45)	5	5:00	Bellator 286	(Note: For the Bellator Featherweight World Championship)
Lightweight	Usman Nurmagomedov	def.	Patricky Pitbull (c)	Decision (unanimous) (50–45, 50–44, 50–44)	5	5:00	Bellator 288	(Note: For the Bellator Lightweight World Championship)
Light Heavyweight	Vadim Nemkov (c)	def.	Corey Anderson	Decision (unanimous) (48–47, 49–46, 49–46)	5	5:00	Bellator 288	(Note: For the Bellator Light Heavyweight World Championship)
Women's Flyweight	Liz Carmouche (c)	def.	Juliana Velasquez	Submission (armbar)	2	4:24	Bellator 289	(Note: For the Bellator Women's Flyweight World Championship)
Bantamweight	Raufeon Stots (ic)	def.	Danny Sabatello	Decision (split) (45–50, 48–47, 48–47)	5	5:00	Bellator 289	(Note: For the interim Bellator Bantamweight World Championship)

== See also ==
- List of Bellator events
- List of current Bellator fighters
- 2022 in UFC
- 2022 in ONE Championship
- 2022 in Absolute Championship Akhmat
- 2022 in Konfrontacja Sztuk Walki
- 2022 in Rizin Fighting Federation
- 2022 in AMC Fight Nights
- 2022 in Brave Combat Federation
- 2022 in Road FC
- 2022 Professional Fighters League season
- 2022 in Eagle Fighting Championship
- 2022 in Legacy Fighting Alliance
- 2022 in combat sports
