= Bellator 289 =

Bellator mixed martial arts event in 2022

Bellator 289: Stots vs. Sabatello
- The poster for Bellator 289: Stots vs. Sabatello
- Promotion: Bellator MMA
- Date: December 9, 2022
- Venue: Mohegan Sun Arena
- City: Uncasville, Connecticut, United States

Event chronology
Bellator 288: Nemkov vs. Anderson 2	Bellator 289: Stots vs. Sabatello	Bellator MMA vs. Rizin FF

Bellator 289: Stots vs. Sabatello was a mixed martial arts event produced by Bellator MMA that took place on December 9, 2022, at the Mohegan Sun Arena in Uncasville, Connecticut, United States.

== Background ==
The semi-finals of the $1-million Bellator Bantamweight World Grand Prix took place at this event, with interim champ Raufeon Stots taking on Danny Sabatello, while Patchy Mix took on Magomed Magomedov. Stots defeated Juan Archuleta for the Interim Bellator Bantamweight Championship in their last outing, knocking him out by the way of headkick in the third round. At the same event, Patchy Mix defeated Kyoji Horiguchi by unanimous decision. Sabatello entered the tournament as a wild card, having defeated Jornel Lugo via unanimous decision for a spot in the tournament, while Magomed Magomedov defeated other wild card Enrique Barzola via guillotine choke in the fourth round.

A title bout rematch for the Bellator Women's Flyweight World Championship between champion Liz Carmouche and Juliana Velasquez took place as the co-main event. Carmouche won the title from Velasquez in April; however, the TKO stoppage was considered controversial as many felt that it happened too early. Following the bout, Velasquez's team appealed the result on the grounds of refereeing error made by Mike Beltran, but the appeal was denied by the Hawaii State Boxing Commission.

== Results ==
Main Card (Showtime)
Weight class				Method	Round	Time	Notes
Bantamweight	Raufeon Stots (ic)	def.	Danny Sabatello	Decision (split) (45–50, 48–47, 48–47)	5	5:00	(Note: Bellator Bantamweight World Grand Prix Tournament Semi-Final bout for the interim Bellator Bantamweight World Championship.)
Women's Flyweight	Liz Carmouche (c)	def.	Juliana Velasquez	Submission (armbar)	2	4:24	(Note: For the Bellator Women's Flyweight World Championship.)
Bantamweight	Patchy Mix	def.	Magomed Magomedov	Technical Submission (guillotine choke)	2	2:39	(Note: Bellator Bantamweight World Grand Prix Tournament Semi-Final bout.)
Middleweight	Dalton Rosta	def.	Anthony Adams	Decision (unanimous) (30–27, 30–27, 30–27)	3	5:00
Preliminary card (Youtube/Pluto TV)
Women's Flyweight	Ilara Joanne	def.	Denise Kielholtz	Decision (split) (27–30, 29–28, 30–27)	3	5:00
Welterweight	Jaleel Willis	def.	Kyle Crutchmer	Decision (unanimous) (30–27, 30–27, 30–27)	3	5:00
Featherweight	Cris Lencioni	def.	Cody Law	Decision (split) (30–27, 28–29, 30–27)	3	5:00
Middleweight	Christian Echols	def.	Pat Downey	KO (punches)	1	2:27
Featherweight	Kai Kamaka III	def.	Kevin Boehm	TKO (punches)	3	2:23
Welterweight	Michael Lombardo	def.	Mark Lemminger	KO (punch)	1	4:23
Bantamweight	Cass Bell	def.	Jared Scoggins	Decision (split) (29–28, 28–29, 29–28)	3	5:00

== See also ==
- 2022 in Bellator MMA
- List of Bellator MMA events
- List of current Bellator fighters
