= Bellator 278 =

Mixed martial arts event in 2022

Bellator 278: Velasquez vs. Carmouche
- The poster for Bellator 278: Velasquez vs. Carmouche
- Promotion: Bellator MMA
- Date: April 22, 2022
- Venue: Neal S. Blaisdell Arena
- City: Honolulu, Hawaii, United States

Event chronology
| Bellator 277: McKee vs. Pitbull 2 | Bellator 278: Velasquez vs. Carmouche | Bellator 279: Cyborg vs. Blencowe 2 |

Bellator 278: Velasquez vs. Carmouche was a mixed martial arts event produced by Bellator MMA that took place on April 22, 2022, at the Neal S. Blaisdell Arena in Honolulu, Hawaii, United States.

== Background ==
The event marked the promotion's fifth visit to Hawaii and first since Bellator 236 in December 2019. The event was dedicated to military and first responders meaning that there would be no tickets on sale to the general public.

The event was headlined by a Bellator Women's Flyweight World Championship bout between undefeated current champion Juliana Velasquez and Liz Carmouche.

The event also featured two wild card qualifier bouts for the Bellator Bantamweight World Grand Prix due to injuries removing Bellator Bantamweight World Champion Sergio Pettis and James Gallagher from the tournament. Josh Hill was to face Enrique Barzola with the winner later meeting Magomed Magomedov in the opening round, while the winner of the second qualifier between Jornel Lugo and Danny Sabatello would face Leandro Higo in the first round of the tournament. Due to Covid, Hill had to pull out of the bout and was replaced by Nikita Mikhailov.

A bantamweight bout between Cee Jay Hamilton and Jared Scoggins was scheduled for this event. However, Scoggins pulled out of the bout for unknown reasons and was replaced by Erik Pérez. Pérez in turn pulled out of the bout and Hamilton was not rebooked, instead being paid his show money, despite not weighing in or fighting.

A lightweight bout between Tofiq Musayev and Zach Zane was scheduled for this event. However, the bout was scrapped after Zane pulled out for unknown reasons and Tofiq wasn't rebooked against a new opponent.

== Results ==
Main Card (Showtime)
| Weight class | | | | Method | Round | Time | Notes |
|---|---|---|---|---|---|---|---|
| Women's Flyweight | Liz Carmouche | def. | Juliana Velasquez (c) | TKO (elbows) | 4 | 4:47 | (Note: For the Bellator Women's Flyweight World Championship.) |
| Catchweight (140 lb) | Enrique Barzola | def. | Nikita Mikhailov | Decision (unanimous) (30–27, 30–27, 30–27) | 3 | 5:00 | (Note: Bellator Bantamweight World Grand Prix Wild Card Qualifier.) |
| Bantamweight | Danny Sabatello | def. | Jornel Lugo | Decision (unanimous) (30–26, 30–26, 30–26) | 3 | 5:00 | (Note: Bellator Bantamweight World Grand Prix Wild Card Qualifier.) |
| Light Heavyweight | Grant Neal | def. | Christian Edwards | Decision (unanimous) (30–27, 30–27, 30–27) | 3 | 5:00 |
| Catchweight (160 lb) | Manny Muro | def. | Nate Andrews | Decision (split) (29–28, 28–29, 29–28) | 3 | 5:00 |
Preliminary card (Youtube/Pluto TV)
| Featherweight | Weber Almeida | def. | Fabricio Franco | TKO (leg kick) | 1 | 3:01 |
| Welterweight | Dante Schiro | def. | Scotty Hao | TKO (punches) | 3 | 1:03 |
| Welterweight | Blake Perry | def. | Makoa Cooper | Submission (anaconda choke) | 2 | 4:14 |

== See also ==
- 2022 in Bellator MMA
- List of Bellator MMA events
- List of current Bellator fighters
