= Bellator MMA vs. Rizin =

Bellator and Rizin mixed martial arts event in 2022

Bellator MMA vs. Rizin FF
- The poster for Bellator MMA vs. Rizin FF
- Promotion(s): Bellator MMA; Rizin Fighting Federation
- Date: December 31, 2022
- City: Saitama, Japan
- Venue: Saitama Super Arena
- Attendance: 23,661

Bellator MMA events chronology
← Previous; Bellator 289: Stots vs. Sabatello	Next → Bellator 290: Bader vs. Fedor 2

Rizin events chronology
← Previous; Rizin Landmark Vol.4	Next → Rizin 41 – Osaka

Bellator MMA vs. Rizin FF and Rizin 40 (also known as Bellator MMA x Rizin 1) was a mixed martial arts event being co-promoted by Bellator MMA and the Rizin Fighting Federation that took place on December 31, 2022, at the Saitama Super Arena in Saitama, Japan.

== Background ==
The main card saw fighters from each promotion fight each other, with the Bellator representatives including a current champion and three former champions: Patrício Pitbull, A. J. McKee, Juan Archuleta and Kyoji Horiguchi. Matches were contested under Rizin's ruleset, which differs from Bellator's usual Unified Rules of Mixed Martial Arts.

The main card aired tape delayed in the U.S. on Showtime, Bellator's regular broadcast partner.

== Results ==
Bellator MMA vs. Rizin (Showtime)
Weight class				Method	Round	Time	Notes
Lightweight	A. J. McKee	def.	Roberto de Souza	Decision (unanimous)	3	5:00
Featherweight	Patrício Pitbull	def.	Kleber Koike Erbst	Decision (unanimous)	3	5:00
Flyweight	Kyoji Horiguchi	def.	Hiromasa Ougikubo	Decision (unanimous)	3	5:00
Bantamweight	Juan Archuleta	def.	Soo Chul Kim	Decision (split)	3	5:00
Lightweight	Gadzhi Rabadanov	def.	Koji Takeda	Decision (unanimous)	3	5:00
Rizin 40 (Fite TV PPV)
Super Atomweight	Seika Izawa	def.	Si Woo Park	Decision (split)	3	5:00	(Note: Rizin Women's Super Atomweight Grand Prix Finals)
Bantamweight	Naoki Inoue	def.	Kenta Takizawa	Submission (kimura)	2	3:53
Heavyweight	Junior Tafa	def.	Tsuyoshi Sudario	TKO (punches)	1	1:38
Flyweight	John Dodson	def.	Hideo Tokoro	KO (punches)	1	1:43
Intermission
Catchweight	Ren Hiramoto	def.	Genji Umeno	KO (punch)	2	3:00	(Note: Special Standing bout rules, exhibition boxing match. Umeno was the mystery fighter.)
Bantamweight	Yuki Motoya	def.	Rogério Bontorin	KO (knee)	2	2:56
Lightweight	Johnny Case	def.	Nobumitsu Osawa	TKO (punches)	1	0:36
Featherweight	Chihiro Suzuki	def.	Yoshiki Nakahara	KO (punches)	1	4:44
Lightweight	Patrick Sho Usami	def.	BeyNoah	KO (punch)	1	0:45
Bantamweight	Yushi	def.	Tatsuya Nakazawa	Decision (unanimous)	3	3:00	(Note: Special Rules bout)

== See also ==
- 2022 in Bellator MMA
- 2022 in Rizin Fighting Federation
- List of Bellator MMA events
