= Bellator 288 =

Bellator mixed martial arts event in 2022

Bellator 288: Nemkov vs. Anderson 2
- The poster for Bellator 288: Nemkov vs. Anderson 2
- Promotion: Bellator MMA
- Date: November 18, 2022
- Venue: Wintrust Arena
- City: Chicago, Illinois, United States

Event chronology
Bellator 287: Piccolotti vs. Barnaoui	Bellator 288: Nemkov vs. Anderson 2	Bellator 289: Stots vs. Sabatello

Bellator 288: Nemkov vs. Anderson 2 was a mixed martial arts event produced by Bellator MMA that took place on November 18, 2022, at the Wintrust Arena in Chicago, Illinois, United States.

== Background ==
The event was headlined by a rematch in the final of the Bellator Light Heavyweight World Grand Prix Tournament for the Bellator Light Heavyweight World Championship between the champion Vadim Nemkov and former title challenger Corey Anderson. The two met earlier in the year at Bellator 277 where the bout ended in a no contest due to an accidental clash of heads at the end of the third round.

A Bellator Lightweight World Championship bout between the champion Patricky Pitbull and undefeated contender Usman Nurmagomedov took place at the event.

A featherweight bout between Daniel Weichel and Akhmed Magomedov was set for this event. However, Magomedov pulled out due to unknown reason and was replaced by Timur Khizriev.

A bantamweight bout between Jaylon Bates and Jornel Lugo was scheduled for this event, however the bout was scrapped the week of the event after Bates pulled out for unknown reasons.

A featherweight bout between Lucas Brennan and Nick Talavera was set for this event. However, Talavera pulled out due to unknown reason the week of the event and the bout was scrapped.

A featherweight bout between Khasan Askhabov and Otto Rodrigues was scheduled for this event, however Askhabov did not attempt to weigh in and the bout was scrapped.

== Results ==
Main Card (Showtime)
Weight class				Method	Round	Time	Notes
Light Heavyweight	Vadim Nemkov (c)	def.	Corey Anderson	Decision (unanimous) (48–47, 49–46, 49–46)	5	5:00	(Note: Bellator Light Heavyweight World Grand Prix Tournament Final bout for the Bellator Light Heavyweight World Championship and $1 million dollar prize.)
Lightweight	Usman Nurmagomedov	def.	Patricky Pitbull (c)	Decision (unanimous) (50–45, 50–44, 50–44)	5	5:00	(Note: For the Bellator Lightweight World Championship.)
Featherweight	Timur Khizriev	def.	Daniel Weichel	Decision (unanimous) (29–28, 30–27, 30–27)	3	5:00
Heavyweight	Daniel James	vs.	Tyrell Fortune	NC (overturned)	2	0:27	(Note: Originally a TKO (punches and elbows) win for James, overturned after he tested positive for anabolic substance.)
Welterweight	Levan Chokheli	def.	Roman Faraldo	Decision (unanimous) (29–27, 29–27, 29–27)	3	5:00
Preliminary card (Youtube/Pluto TV)
Middleweight	Imamshafi Aliev	def.	Sean Connor Fallon	TKO (doctor stoppage)	1	3:20
Lightweight	Killys Mota	def.	Jairo Pacheco	Decision (unanimous) (30-27, 30-27, 30-27)	3	5:00
Lightweight	Archie Colgan	def.	Jesse Hannam	TKO (punches)	1	0:50
Light Heavyweight	Sullivan Cauley	def.	Jay Radick	KO (punch)	1	1:01
Middleweight	Jordan Newman	def.	Jayden Taulker	Submission (rear-naked choke)	2	3:20
Featherweight	Laird Anderson	def.	Rob Fenicle	TKO (elbows and punches)	2	2:28
Featherweight	Isaiah Hokit	def.	Matias Nader	TKO (punches)	2	3:48
Heavyweight	Wladmir Gouvea	def.	Kory Moegenburg	TKO (knee and punches)	2	1:46

== See also ==
- 2022 in Bellator MMA
- List of Bellator MMA events
- List of current Bellator fighters
