= Raufeon Stots =

American mixed martial artist

- Born: December 16, 1988 (age 37); Houston, Texas, U.S.
- Other names: Supa
- Height: 5 ft 7 in (1.70 m)
- Weight: 135 lb (61 kg; 9.6 st)
- Division: Bantamweight
- Style: Wrestling
- Fighting out of: Milwaukee, Wisconsin, U.S.
- Team: 802 MMA (2013–2014); Miletich Fighting Systems (2014–2015); Roufusport (2015–present)
- Rank: Brown belt in Brazilian Jiu-Jitsu
- Wrestling: NCAA Division II Wrestling
- Years active: 2015–present

Mixed martial arts record
- Total: 26
- Wins: 21
- By knockout: 4
- By submission: 5
- By decision: 12
- Losses: 5
- By knockout: 2
- By decision: 3

Other information
- University: University of Nebraska at Kearney
- Notable school: Klein Oak High School
- Mixed martial arts record from Sherdog

Raufeon Stots (born December 16, 1988) is an American professional mixed martial artist and graduated collegiate wrestler. He currently competes in the Bantamweight division of the Professional Fighters League. He previously competed in Bellator MMA, where he is a former interim Bellator Bantamweight Champion. As a wrestler, he is a two-time NCAA Division II champion.

== Background ==
Stots grew up modestly in Houston, Texas, with his mother and two brothers. He started wrestling in his junior year at Klein Oak High School in Klein, Texas, after the passing of his mother. He then earned a scholarship at Labette Community College and became an All-American with a fourth-place finish in the NJCAA level as a freshman. As a sophomore, he once again qualified for the NJCAA tournament, but did not place. He then transferred to the University of Nebraska-Kearney (NCAA Division II), where he was forced to take a medical redshirt instead of a junior season. When he came back as a junior, he won his first DII title with a record of 30 wins and 6 losses, helping the team reach the team title. As a senior, he compiled his second NCAA title and helped the team win the team championship before graduating.

When transferring from collegiate wrestling to mixed martial arts, Stots found that it wasn't only his work ethic but also the body awareness that helped him move over and adapt to the new sport quickly.

During his transition, fellow Nebraska wrestler-turned-mixed martial artist Kamaru Usman, took Stots under his wing as a mentor.

== Mixed martial arts career ==
=== Early career ===
Stots got into mixed martial arts after being introduced to the sport by Jens Pulver and Pat Miletich. After turning pro in May 2015, he compiled 8 wins and no losses before competing at a regional event featured on the Lookin' for a Fight show, in an attempt of getting signed by the UFC. After losing the bout, he compiled 4 more wins before getting signed by Bellator MMA.

Stots chose to sign with Bellator out of LFA due to where he saw the promotion heading. Stots said the signing of prospects in the sport instead of former UFC fighters was a big reason, giving him the opportunity to fight some of the best in the world. In addition to that, the Grand Prix tournaments put on by the promotion was another deciding factor for Stots.

=== Bellator MMA ===
In his promotional debut, Stots faced Cheyden Leialoha on December 21, 2019, at Bellator 236. He won the bout by unanimous decision.

Stots faced Cass Bell on July 24, 2020, at Bellator 242. He won the match via submission in the third round.

Stots faced Keith Lee at Bellator 253 on November 19, 2020. He won the fight by unanimous decision.

Stots faced Josh Hill at Bellator 258 on May 7, 2021. He won the bout via unanimous decision.

Stots was scheduled to face Magomed Magomedov on July 31, 2021, at Bellator 263. On July 19, it was announced that the bout was scratched from the event. It was rescheduled for Bellator 264 on August 13, 2021. Stots won the bout via unanimous decision.

==== Bellator Bantamweight World Grand Prix and Interim Champ ====
In the first round bout of the $1 million Bellator Bantamweight World Grand Prix Tournament, Stots was scheduled to face Sergio Pettis for the Bellator Bantamweight World Championship on April 23, 2022, at Bellator 279. However, Pettis was forced to pull out of the bout and the Grand Prix after sustaining an injury that required surgery, resulting in Juan Archuleta taking his place and the bout now being held for the Interim Bellator Bantamweight World Championship. Stots won the bout and became the interim champion after knocking down Archuleta with a head kick and then finishing him on the ground with elbows at the beginning of the third round.

In the semi-finals, Stots faced Danny Sabatello on December 9, 2022, in the main event at Bellator 289. He won the fight via controversial split decision. 4 out of 6 media outlets scored it for Stots.

In the finals, Stots faced Patchy Mix on April 22, 2023, at Bellator 295. He lost the bout and the title, getting knocked out in the first round with a step up knee.

Stots rematched Danny Sabatello on November 17, 2023, at Bellator 301. In a thrilling bout, Stots won the bout via unanimous decision.

=== Professional Fighters League ===
Stots was scheduled to face Marcos Breno on September 7, 2024, at Bellator Champions Series 4. However, the bout was removed from the event for unknown reasons. The bout was rescheduled to instead take place on October 19, 2024, at PFL Super Fights: Battle of the Giants. Stots won the fight via a rear-naked choke submission in the third round.

Stots next faced Sergio Pettis at PFL 7 on June 27, 2025. He lost the fight via unanimous decision.

Stots faced Renat Khavalov at PFL Chicago: Pettis vs. McKee on April 11, 2026, and lost the bout via unanimous decision.

Stots faced Lazaro Dayron on July 31, 2026, at PFL New York. He lost the fight via split decision.

== Personal life ==
Stots is married to Michaela whom he met in college. She is an educator and mother. Stots has two sons.

== Championships and accomplishments ==
=== Mixed martial arts ===
- Bellator MMA
  - Bellator Interim Bantamweight World Championship (One time)
    - One successful title defence

=== Folkstyle wrestling ===
- National Collegiate Athletic Association
  - NCAA Division II Champion out of University of Nebraska at Kearney (2012, 2013)
  - NCAA Division II All-American out of University of Nebraska at Kearney (2012, 2013)
- National Junior College Athletic Association
  - NJCAA All-American out of Labette Community College (2009)

== Mixed martial arts record ==
Professional record breakdown
26 matches	21 wins	5 losses
By knockout	4	2
By submission	5	0
By decision	12	3

Res.	Record	Opponent	Method	Event	Date	Round	Time	Location	Notes
Loss	21–5	Lázaro Dayron	Decision (split)	PFL New York: Nurmagomedov vs. Colgan	July 31, 2026	3	5:00	Elmont, New York, United States	
Loss	21–4	Renat Khavalov	Decision (unanimous)	PFL Chicago: Pettis vs. McKee	April 11, 2026	3	5:00	Chicago, Illinois, United States	
Loss	21–3	Sergio Pettis	Decision (unanimous)	PFL 7 (2025)	June 27, 2025	3	5:00	Chicago, Illinois, United States	
Win	21–2	Marcos Breno	Submission (rear-naked choke)	PFL Super Fights: Battle of the Giants	October 19, 2024	3	3:01	Riyadh, Saudi Arabia	
Win	20–2	Danny Sabatello	Decision (unanimous)	Bellator 301	November 17, 2023	3	5:00	Chicago, Illinois, United States	
Loss	19–2	Patchy Mix	KO (knee)	Bellator 295	April 22, 2023	1	1:20	Honolulu, Hawaii, United States	Bellator Bantamweight World Grand Prix Final. Lost the interim Bellator Bantamweight World Championship.
Win	19–1	Danny Sabatello	Decision (split)	Bellator 289	December 9, 2022	5	5:00	Uncasville, Connecticut, United States	Bellator Bantamweight World Grand Prix Semifinal. Defended the interim Bellator Bantamweight World Championship.
Win	18–1	Juan Archuleta	KO (head kick and elbows)	Bellator 279	April 23, 2022	3	0:16	Honolulu, Hawaii, United States	Bellator Bantamweight World Grand Prix Quarterfinal. Won the interim Bellator Bantamweight World Championship.
Win	17–1	Magomed Magomedov	Decision (unanimous)	Bellator 264	August 13, 2021	3	5:00	Uncasville, Connecticut, United States	
Win	16–1	Josh Hill	Decision (unanimous)	Bellator 258	May 7, 2021	3	5:00	Uncasville, Connecticut, United States	
Win	15–1	Keith Lee	Decision (unanimous)	Bellator 253	November 19, 2020	3	5:00	Uncasville, Connecticut, United States	
Win	14–1	Cass Bell	Submission (rear-naked choke)	Bellator 242	July 24, 2020	3	1:24	Uncasville, Connecticut, United States	
Win	13–1	Cheyden Leialoha	Decision (unanimous)	Bellator 236	December 21, 2019	3	5:00	Honolulu, Hawaii, United States	
Win	12–1	Ralph Acosta	Decision (unanimous)	LFA 68	May 31, 2019	3	5:00	Dallas, Texas, United States	
Win	11–1	Levi Mowles	Decision (unanimous)	LFA 55	November 30, 2018	3	5:00	Dallas, Texas, United States	
Win	10–1	Ryan Lilley	TKO (punches)	LFA 48	September 7, 2018	3	3:00	Kearney, Nebraska, United States	
Win	9–1	Arnold Berdon	Submission (rear-naked choke)	Victory FC 59	December 16, 2017	1	4:36	Omaha, Nebraska, United States	Defended the VFC Bantamweight Championship.
Loss	8–1	Merab Dvalishvili	KO (spinning backfist)	Ring of Combat 59	June 2, 2017	1	0:15	Atlantic City, New Jersey, United States	For the Ring of Combat Bantamweight Championship.
Win	8–0	Rob Emerson	Decision (unanimous)	Victory FC 56	April 14, 2017	5	5:00	Omaha, Nebraska, United States	Won the VFC Bantamweight Championship.
Win	7–0	Jeff Curran	Decision (unanimous)	Victory FC 53	November 23, 2016	3	5:00	Waterloo, Iowa, United States	
Win	6–0	Charlie DuBray	Submission (rear-naked choke)	Victory FC 52	July 16, 2016	2	4:52	Omaha, Nebraska, United States	
Win	5–0	William Joplin	KO (punch)	Victory FC 49	April 1, 2016	1	1:18	Omaha, Nebraska, United States	
Win	4–0	Demetrius Wilson	Submission (rear-naked choke)	Victory FC 47	January 29, 2016	3	4:45	Omaha, Nebraska, United States	
Win	3–0	Rob Menigoz	Decision (unanimous)	United Combat League: Cut Throath	September 19, 2015	3	5:00	Hammond, Indiana, United States	
Win	2–0	Mitch White	Decision (unanimous)	Legacy FC 43	July 17, 2015	3	5:00	Hinckley, Minnesota, United States	Bantamweight debut.
Win	1–0	Mike Hebdon	TKO (punches)	Extreme Challenge 232	May 30, 2015	2	0:35	Clinton, Iowa, United States	Lightweight debut.

== NCAA record ==
NCAA Division II Championships Matches
Res.	Record	Opponent	Score	Date	Event
2013 NCAA (DII) Championships (gold) at 149 lbs
Win	8–0	Jacobd Horn	4-3	March 8–9, 2013	2013 NCAA Division II Wrestling Championships
Win	7-0	James Martinez	MD 12-4	March 8–9, 2013	2013 NCAA Division II Wrestling Championships
Win	6–0	Ryan Maus	6-1	March 8–9, 2013	2013 NCAA Division II Wrestling Championships
Win	5–0	Nate Herda	3-2	March 8–9, 2013	2013 NCAA Division II Wrestling Championships
2012 NCAA (DII) Championships (gold) at 149 lbs
Win	4–0	John Hagerty	5-4	March 9–10, 2012	2012 NCAA Division II Wrestling Championships
Win	3-0	Ky Corley	6-1	March 9–10, 2012	2012 NCAA Division II Wrestling Championships
Win	2–0	Nate Herda	8-5	March 9–10, 2012	2012 NCAA Division II Wrestling Championships
Win	1–0	Nathan Link	MD 12-4	March 9–10, 2012	2012 NCAA Division II Wrestling Championships

== See also ==
- List of current Bellator fighters
- List of male mixed martial artists
