= Bellator 279 =

Mixed martial arts event in 2022

Bellator 279: Cyborg vs. Blencowe 2
- The poster for Bellator 279: Cyborg vs. Blencowe 2
- Promotion: Bellator MMA
- Date: April 23, 2022
- Venue: Neal S. Blaisdell Arena
- City: Honolulu, Hawaii, United States

Event chronology
Bellator 278: Velasquez vs. Carmouche	Bellator 279: Cyborg vs. Blencowe 2	Bellator 280: Bader vs. Kongo

Bellator 279: Cyborg vs. Blencowe 2 was a mixed martial arts event produced by Bellator MMA held on April 23, 2022, at the Neal S. Blaisdell Arena in Honolulu, Hawaii, United States.

== Background ==
The main event featured Bellator Women's Featherweight Champion Cris Cyborg defending her title in a rematch against Arlene Blencowe.

As the start of the $1-million Bellator Bantamweight World Grand Prix, the opening round was originally set to start with reigning Bellator Bantamweight Champion Sergio Pettis facing off against former teammate Raufeon Stots, while former champion Kyoji Horiguchi faced Patchy Mix. However, Pettis was forced to pull out of the bout and the Grand Prix after sustaining an injury that required surgery, resulting in Juan Archuleta taking his place and the bout instead being held for the Interim Bellator Bantamweight Championship.

At the weigh-ins, Whittany Pyles missed weight for her bout, weighing in at 127.4 pounds, 1.4 pounds over the flyweight non-title fight limit. The bout proceeded at catchweight and Pyles was fined a percentage of her purse which went to her opponent Sumiko Inaba.

== Results ==
Main Card (Showtime)
Weight class				Method	Round	Time	Notes
Women's Featherweight	Cris Cyborg (c)	def.	Arlene Blencowe	Decision (unanimous) (49–45, 49–45, 49–45)	5	5:00	(Note: For the Bellator Women's Featherweight World Championship. Cyborg was deducted a point in Round 1 due to an illegal knee.)
Bantamweight	Raufeon Stots	def.	Juan Archuleta	KO (head kick and elbows)	3	0:16	(Note: Bellator Bantamweight World Grand Prix Tournament Quarter-Final bout for the interim Bellator Bantamweight World Championship)
Women's Flyweight	Justine Kish	def.	Ilima-Lei Macfarlane	Decision (unanimous) (30–27, 29–28, 29–28)	3	5:00
Bantamweight	Patchy Mix	def.	Kyoji Horiguchi	Decision (unanimous) (48–47, 48–47, 48–47)	5	5:00	(Note: Bellator Bantamweight World Grand Prix Tournament Quarter-Final bout.)
Lightweight	Yancy Medeiros	def.	Emmanuel Sanchez	Decision (unanimous) (29–28, 30–27, 30–27)	3	5:00
Preliminary card (Youtube/Pluto TV)
Welterweight	Goiti Yamauchi	def.	Levan Chokheli	Submission (armbar)	1	3:49
Lightweight	Bobby King	def.	Keoni Diggs	Decision (split) (29–28, 28–29, 30–27)	3	5:00
Women's Featherweight	Dayana Silva	def.	Janay Harding	Decision (unanimous) (30–27, 30–27, 30–27)	3	5:00
Featherweight	Justin Gonzales	def.	Kai Kamaka III	Decision (split) (28–29, 30–27, 29–28)	3	5:00
Lightweight	Lance Gibson Jr.	def.	Nainoa Dung	Decision (unanimous) (30–26, 30–25, 30–25)	3	5:00
Postliminary card (Youtube/Pluto TV)
Bantamweight	Jordan Winski	def.	Ryan Dela Cruz	Decision (unanimous) (29–28, 29–28, 29–28)	3	5:00
Catchweight (120 lb)	Randi Field	def.	Maraya Miller	Submission (rear-naked choke)	2	0:48
Catchweight (127.4 lb)	Sumiko Inaba	def.	Whittany Pyles	KO (punches)	1	1:22	(Note: Originally a flyweight bout; Pyles missed weight)

== See also ==
- 2022 in Bellator MMA
- List of Bellator MMA events
- List of current Bellator fighters
