= Danny Sabatello =

American mixed martial arts fighter

- Born: Daniel Anthony Sabatello; March 31, 1993 (age 33); Chicago, Illinois, U.S.
- Other names: The Italian Gangster
- Height: 5 ft 10 in (1.78 m)
- Weight: 135 lb (61 kg; 9 st 9 lb)
- Division: Bantamweight
- Reach: 72 in (183 cm)
- Style: Collegiate wrestling
- Fighting out of: Sunrise, Florida, U.S.
- Team: American Top Team
- Wrestling: NCAA Division I Wrestling
- Years active: 2018–present

Mixed martial arts record
- Total: 24
- Wins: 19
- By knockout: 5
- By submission: 5
- By decision: 9
- Losses: 4
- By knockout: 1
- By submission: 1
- By decision: 2
- Draws: 1

Other information
- University: Purdue University
- Mixed martial arts record from Sherdog

Daniel Anthony Sabatello (born March 31, 1993) is an American mixed martial artist who competes in the Bantamweight division of RIZIN Fighting Federation. As of January 2026, Sabatello is the RIZIN Bantamweight World Champion.

== Background ==
Coming from a Sicilian family whose roots trace back to Palermo, Danny was born in Chicago, Illinois to Greg and Nancy Sabatello in the suburb of Long Grove. He graduated from Stevenson High School in Lincolnshire, Illinois, where he was a two-time Illinois state champion, going 152-19, which included two years at St. Viator High School. He went to wrestle Division I at Purdue University, where his older brothers Joey and Vinny also went. While there, he was a three-time NCAA Championships qualifier at 133 and 141, and a two-time 141-pound Big Ten Championship place-winner. He also become the first Purdue wrestler to twice earn Big Ten Wrestler of the Week honors in his career. After finishing his college degree in Law and Society with a minor in Organizational Leadership and Supervision, he moved to South Florida after his wrestling career on a whim to become a MMA fighter, eventually landing at American Top Team.

== Mixed martial arts career ==
=== Early career ===
Making his MMA debut in 2018, Sabatello submitted Ray Paige in the first round and would go on to defeat his next 4 opponents on the Florida regional scene, 3 by first round stoppages. Making his debut for Titan FC at Titan FC 56, Sabatello defeated Philip Keller via TKO stoppage in the first round. He was then given a chance to challenge reigning champ Irwin Rivera at Titan FC 58 on December 20, 2019. Sabatello lost the bout via fourth-round technical knockout due to a body punch.

Rebounding at Titan FC 56, he submitted Chris Johnson in the third round via arm-triangle choke, and at Titan FC 60, Sabatello was given another chance for the Titan FC Bantamweight Championship against Raymond Ramos, winning the bout and title via rear-naked choke in the first round.

After winning the Titan FC title, Sabatello was given a spot on Dana White's Contender Series 35 against Taylor Moore. Despite judges scores of 30-24, 30-25, 30-26 on the road to a unanimous decision victory, Sabatello was not given a UFC contract.

Returning to Titan FC, Sabatello faced future UFC fighter Da’mon Blackshear at Titan FC 67, defeating him over five round to defend his title.

=== Bellator MMA ===
Sabatello, as a replacement for Matheus Mattos, faced Brett Johns on May 21, 2021 at Bellator 259. Sabatello won the bout via unanimous decision.

Sabatello was expected to face the 34-fight veteran Johnny Campbell on August 13, 2021 at Bellator 264. However, the bout was cancelled during fight week due to health and safety protocols, with Sabatello being confirmed to have tested positive for COVID-19.

==== Bellator Bantamweight World Grand Prix ====
Due to the pull out of two fighters from the Bellator Bantamweight World Grand Prix due to injuries, a wild card bout between Sabatello and Jornel Lugo was announced for April 22, 2022 at Bellator 278. He won the bout in dominant fashion via unanimous decision.

After the bout, Sabatello signed a new long term deal with the promotion.

Sabatello faced Leandro Higo in the quarter-finals of the Bellator Bantamweight World Grand Prix at Bellator 282 on June 24, 2022. He won the bout via unanimous decision. Sabatello was fined $5,000 for abusive language in his post fight speech by the Mohegan Tribe Department of Athletic Regulation.

In the semi-finals, Sabatello faced Raufeon Stots for the Interim Bellator Bantamweight World Championship on December 9, 2022 in the main event at Bellator 289. He lost the fight via split decision.

==== Post Grand Prix ====
Sabatello faced Marcos Breno on April 21, 2023 at Bellator 294. He won the bout in the second round after wearing Breno down and submitting him with a rear-naked choke.

Sabatello faced Magomed Magomedov on July 30, 2023 at Bellator MMA x Rizin 2. He lost the fight via a guillotine choke submission in the first round.

Sabatello rematched Raufeon Stots on November 17, 2023 at Bellator 301. In a thrilling bout, Sabatello lost the bout via unanimous decision.

Sabatello faced Lazaro Dayron on August 16, 2024 at PFL 8. The bout was declared a majority draw.

=== Rizin Fighting Federation ===
On February 27, 2025, it was announced that Sabatello was no longer under contract with PFL and signed with Rizin FF.

Sabatello made his Rizin FF. Debut against 2016 Olympic Silver Medalist Shinobu Ota at Rizin: Otoko Matsuri on May 4, 2025, Sabatello won the fight by KO in the third round

Sabatello faced Shoko Sato at Rizin 51 On September 28, 2025. He won the bout by split decision.

==== Rizin bantamweight champion ====
Sabatello challenged for the Rizin Bantamweight Championship against Naoki Inoue at Rizin: Shiwasu no Cho Tsuwamono Matsuri on December 31, 2025. Sabatello won the fight by split decision.

Sabatello made the first defense of the Rizin Bantamweight Championship against Joji Goto at Rizin Landmark 13 on April 12, 2026. Sabatello won the fight by unanimous decision.

Sabatello made his second title defense against Jinnosuke Kashimura at Rizin Landmark 15 on July 18, 2026. Sabatello won the fight by knockout in the third round.

== Freestyle wrestling ==
Sabatello is scheduled to make his Real American Freestyle debut against Jacob Schultz on November 28, 2026 at RAF 15.

== Championships and accomplishments ==
- Rizin Fighting Federation
  - Rizin Bantamweight Championship (One time; current)
    - Two successful title defenses
- Titan Fighting Championships
  - Titan FC Bantamweight Championship (one time)
    - One successful title defense

== Mixed martial arts record ==
Professional record breakdown
24 matches	19 wins	4 losses
By knockout	5	1
By submission	5	1
By decision	9	2
Draws	1	

Res.	Record	Opponent	Method	Event	Date	Round	Time	Location	Notes
Win	19–4–1	Jinnosuke Kashimura	KO (punch)	Rizin Landmark 15	July 18, 2026	3	0:40	Hiroshima, Japan	Defended the Rizin Bantamweight Championship.
Win	18–4–1	Joji Goto	Decision (unanimous)	Rizin Landmark 13	April 12, 2026	3	5:00	Fukuoka, Japan	Defended the Rizin Bantamweight Championship.
Win	17–4–1	Naoki Inoue	Decision (split)	Rizin: Shiwasu no Cho Tsuwamono Matsuri	December 31, 2025	3	5:00	Saitama, Japan	Won the Rizin Bantamweight Championship.
Win	16–4–1	Shoko Sato	Decision (split)	Rizin 51	September 28, 2025	3	5:00	Nagoya, Japan	
Win	15–4–1	Shinobu Ota	KO (punches)	Rizin: Otoko Matsuri	May 4, 2025	3	0:20	Tokyo, Japan	
Draw	14–4–1	Lazaro Dayron	Draw (majority)	PFL 8 (2024)	August 16, 2024	3	5:00	Hollywood, Florida, United States	Dayron was deducted one point in round 3 due to grabbing the fence.
Loss	14–4	Raufeon Stots	Decision (unanimous)	Bellator 301	November 17, 2023	3	5:00	Chicago, Illinois, United States	
Loss	14–3	Magomed Magomedov	Submission (guillotine choke)	Bellator MMA x Rizin 2	July 30, 2023	1	3:55	Saitama, Japan	
Win	14–2	Marcos Breno	Submission (rear-naked choke)	Bellator 294	April 21, 2023	2	4:10	Honolulu, Hawaii, United States	
Loss	13–2	Raufeon Stots	Decision (split)	Bellator 289	December 9, 2022	5	5:00	Uncasville, Connecticut, United States	Bellator Bantamweight World Grand Prix Semifinal. For the interim Bellator Bantamweight World Championship.
Win	13–1	Leandro Higo	Decision (unanimous)	Bellator 282	June 24, 2022	5	5:00	Uncasville, Connecticut, United States	Bellator Bantamweight World Grand Prix Quarterfinal.
Win	12–1	Jornel Lugo	Decision (unanimous)	Bellator 278	April 22, 2022	3	5:00	Honolulu, Hawaii, United States	Bellator Bantamweight World Grand Prix Wild Card Qualifier.
Win	11–1	Brett Johns	Decision (unanimous)	Bellator 259	May 21, 2021	3	5:00	Uncasville, Connecticut, United States	
Win	10–1	Da'Mon Blackshear	Decision (unanimous)	Titan FC 67	February 12, 2021	5	5:00	Miami, Florida, United States	Defended the Titan FC Bantamweight Championship.
Win	9–1	Taylor Moore	Decision (unanimous)	Dana White's Contender Series 35	November 10, 2020	3	5:00	Las Vegas, Nevada, United States	
Win	8–1	Raymond Ramos	Submission (rear-naked choke)	Titan FC 61	June 26, 2020	1	1:56	Miami, Florida, United States	Won the vacant Titan FC Bantamweight Championship.
Win	7–1	Chris Johnson	Submission (arm-triangle choke)	Titan FC 60	May 29, 2020	3	1:54	Miami, Florida, United States	
Loss	6–1	Irwin Rivera	TKO (punch to the body)	Titan FC 58	December 20, 2019	4	4:26	Fort Lauderdale, Florida, United States	For the Titan FC Bantamweight Championship.
Win	6–0	Philip Keller	TKO (punches)	Titan FC 56	August 23, 2019	1	1:41	Fort Lauderdale, Florida, United States	
Win	5–0	Earnest Walls	Submission (rear-naked choke)	War at the Rock 2	June 19, 2019	1	1:34	Hollywood, Florida, United States	Catchweight (140 lb) bout.
Win	4–0	John Barragan	KO	Underground Cage Fighting Championship 3	March 30, 2019	1	2:29	West Palm Beach, Florida, United States	
Win	3–0	Jeremias Fernandez	Decision (unanimous)	War at the Rock 1	February 16, 2019	3	5:00	Hollywood, Florida, United States	
Win	2–0	Cesar Danny Gonzalez	KO (punch)	Underground Cage Fighting Championship 2	November 17, 2018	1	0:53	West Palm Beach, Florida, United States	
Win	1–0	Ray Paige	Submission	Underground Cage Fighting Championship 1	July 21, 2018	1	2:55	West Palm Beach, Florida, United States	

== See also ==
- List of Dana White's Contender Series alumni
- List of male mixed martial artists
