= Bellator 282 =

Bellator mixed martial arts event in 2022

Bellator 282: Mousasi vs. Eblen
- The poster for Bellator 282: Mousasi vs. Eblen
- Promotion: Bellator MMA
- Date: June 24, 2022
- Venue: Mohegan Sun Arena
- City: Uncasville, Connecticut, United States

Event chronology
Bellator 281: MVP vs. Storley	Bellator 282: Mousasi vs. Eblen	Bellator 283: Lima vs. Jackson

Bellator 282: Mousasi vs. Eblen was a mixed martial arts event produced by Bellator MMA that took place on June 24, 2022, at Mohegan Sun Arena in Uncasville, Connecticut, United States.

== Background ==
A Bellator Middleweight World Championship bout between current two-time champion (also former Strikeforce Light Heavyweight Champion) Gegard Mousasi and Johnny Eblen served as the main event.

In addition to the middleweight main event, two quarterfinal bouts in the Bellator Bantamweight World Grand Prix were featured at the event. The first bout saw #4 ranked Magomed Magomedov facing Enrique Barzola. The second bout saw #6 ranked Leandro Higo opposite Danny Sabatello.

== Results ==
Main Card (Showtime)
Weight class				Method	Round	Time	Notes
Middleweight	Johnny Eblen	def.	Gegard Mousasi (c)	Decision (unanimous) (50–45, 50–45, 50–45)	5	5:00	(Note: For the Bellator Middleweight World Championship.)
Bantamweight	Danny Sabatello	def.	Leandro Higo	Decision (unanimous) (49–46, 49–46, 49–46)	5	5:00	(Note: Bellator Bantamweight World Grand Prix Tournament Quarter-Final bout.)
Bantamweight	Magomed Magomedov	def.	Enrique Barzola	Submission (guillotine choke)	4	1:27	(Note: Bellator Bantamweight World Grand Prix Tournament Quarter-Final bout.)
Welterweight	Brennan Ward	def.	Kassius Kayne	TKO (punches)	2	1:11
Preliminary card (Youtube/Pluto TV)
Lightweight	Killys Mota	def.	Dan Moret	Decision (unanimous) (30–27, 30–27, 30–27)	3	5:00
Featherweight	Lucas Brennan	def.	Johnny Soto	Submission (rear-naked choke)	1	3:34
Lightweight	Alexandr Shabliy	def.	Brent Primus	TKO (punches)	2	1:22
Women's Featherweight	Cat Zingano	def.	Pam Sorenson	Decision (unanimous) (29–26, 29–27, 29–27)	3	5:00	(Note: Zingano was deducted a point in Round 1 due to an illegal knee.)
Middleweight	Anatoly Tokov	def.	Muhammad Abdullah	TKO (punches)	1	2:28
Welterweight	Sabah Homasi	def.	Maycon Mendonça	KO (punch)	1	0:58
Women's Flyweight	Ilara Joanne	def.	Alejandra Lara	Decision (unanimous) (30–26, 29–27, 29–27)	3	5:00	(Note: Lara was deducted a point in Round 2 for kicking Joanne in the head while she was a downed opponent.)
Featherweight	James Gonzalez	def.	Cody Law	Decision (unanimous) (29–27, 29–28, 30–26)	3	5:00
Middleweight	Aaron Jeffery	def.	Fabio Aguiar	TKO (knee and punches)	2	3:30
Lightweight	Mandel Nallo	def.	Bryce Logan	KO (punch)	1	1:07

== See also ==
- 2022 in Bellator MMA
- List of Bellator MMA events
- List of current Bellator fighters
