= Magomed Magomedov (fighter) =

Russian mixed martial artist

- Born: Magomed Zhamaludinovich Magomedov; December 25, 1991 (age 34); Khasavyurt, Dagestan, Russia
- Other names: Tiger
- Height: 5 ft 6 in (1.68 m)
- Weight: 135 lb (61 kg; 9.6 st)
- Division: Bantamweight
- Reach: 69 in (175 cm)
- Fighting out of: Makhachkala, Dagestan, Russia
- Team: DagFighter
- Years active: 2011–present

Mixed martial arts record
- Total: 28
- Wins: 22
- By knockout: 4
- By submission: 10
- By decision: 8
- Losses: 6
- By knockout: 2
- By submission: 1
- By decision: 3

Other information
- Mixed martial arts record from Sherdog

Magomed Zhamaludinovich Magomedov (born December 25, 1991) is a Russian mixed martial artist who competes in the Bantamweight division of Professional Fighters League. He previously competed in Bellator MMA and Absolute Championship Berkut (ACB). As of April 21, 2026, he is #7 in the PFL bantamweight rankings.

== Background ==
Magomed was born in the city of Khasavyurt, in Dagestan. He went to one of the schools in Makhachkala, but rarely went to his classes, preferring to skip them with his peers. To make sure his parents did not suspect anything, he put marks in his diary for the main subjects and forged the teachers' signatures. One day, his father visited the school and found out that his 14-year-old son had not been there for 4 months.

The punishment was severe, but at the same time fateful for Magomedov. He was enrolled in the sports boarding school Five Directions of the World, where he began to study martial arts and did not have the opportunity to skip classes. The first month and a half was very hard, but gradually Magomed got used to the routine. Here he met Zabit Magomedsharipov, who inspired him to study wushu sanda.

For a long time, "Tiger" could not get into the tournament for the regional level, and he did not even dream about competing on the national level. Nevertheless, training with more experienced partners under the guidance of Alexander Buryak, he began to gradually get in shape and give a better account of himself in competitions. By 2011, Magomed completely retrained in mixed martial arts, since many of his acquaintances and friends began to build their careers in this sport. Speaking at the national championship in MMA, and after - in Europe, as an amateur champion, he migrated to professionals.

== Mixed martial arts career ==
=== Early career ===
It all started with M-1 Ukraine, where the Dagestan athlete smashed Ivan Prokopenko. The successful debut was followed by performances on events Legion Fight 10, SRPO Federation of Mixed Combat: Ultimatum 1, Pride of Caucasus and Pro FC 45: Thunder in Grozny, which brought victories over compatriots Garun Dibirov, Agil Ragimov, Kutmanbek Ashirov and Yakub Tangiev.

The result allowed him to move to M-1 Challenge and make a name in the company of prominent colleagues from Russia and abroad. Within a couple of years, the athlete from Dagestan gained a reputation of an unbeatable fighter in fights with representatives of different nationalities. He won by unanimous decision of judges against Damian Stasiak of Poland and Paata Robakidze of Georgia. His bout with Yuri Maia of Brazil ended with a technical knockout and Anton Vasiliev of Ukraine suffered a painful hold.

=== Absolute Championship Berkut ===
During the year, he got four more wins and moved to the ACB league, where he was waiting for great success and serious media growth. In his debut, he managed to defeat Arthur Kashcheev by technical knockout at ACB 18, then dismantled the Brazilian Bruno Diaz in a difficult fight at ACB 24.

The leadership of the organization appreciated the young prospect, giving him the opportunity to fight for the champion title, which was then owned by Petr Yan. Their fight was held in Moscow on 26 March 2016 in Moscow at ACB 32, and it lasted all 5 rounds, since neither of the participants planned to retreat. Even the judges could not unanimously determine the winner, but still gave the split decision to Magomedov. Many did not agree with this verdict, however, many felt that Yan had won the fight, including ACB president, Mairbek Khasiev who promised to book a rematch. This fight was voted as ACB's best fight of the year in 2016.

Having rested for 9 months, "Tiger" went to the first defense at ACB 50, catching Oleg Borisov on the guillotine just 10 seconds before the end of the duel. At the same time, Petr Yan deserved a chance to challenge the title again facing off again on 15 April at ACB 57 in Moscow, but this time Yan managed to perform more convincingly, beating Magomedov by unaniumous decision. In the summer of 2017, Magomedov returned and defeated Dean Garnett at ACB 67, and in 2018, he performed twice, dismantling Edgars Skrivers at ACB 83 and Walter Pereira at ACB 90.

=== Bellator MMA ===
On October 14, 2020, it was announced that Magomedov signed with Bellator MMA.

In his promotional debut, Magomedov faced Matheus Mattos on December 10, 2020, at Bellator 254. He won the bout via unanimous decision.

Magomedov was scheduled to face Jared Scoggins on April 2, 2021, at Bellator 255. However, Scoggins pulled out of the bout due to undisclosed reasons. He was replaced by Cee Jay Hamilton. He won the fight via rear-naked choke submission in the second round.

Magomedov was scheduled to face Raufeon Stots on July 31, 2021, at Bellator 263. On July 19, it was announced that the bout was scratched from the event. It was rescheduled for Bellator 264 on August 13, 2021. He lost the bout via unanimous decision.

==== Bellator Bantamweight World Grand Prix ====
Magomedov faced Enrique Barzola in the quarter-finals of the Bellator Bantamweight World Grand Prix at Bellator 282 on June 24, 2022. He won the bout via guillotine choke in the fourth round.

In the semi-finals, Magomedov faced former Bellator Bantamweight World Championship challenger Patchy Mix on December 9, 2022, at Bellator 289. He lost the bout via second round technical submission.

==== Post Grand Prix ====
In his first bout after losing in the grand prix, Magomedov faced Danny Sabatello on July 30, 2023 at Bellator MMA x Rizin 2. He won the fight via a guillotine choke submission in the first round.

Magomedov faced Patchy Mix in a rematch, for the Bellator Bantamweight World Championship on May 17, 2024 at Bellator Champions Series 2. He lost the fight via a split decision.

=== Professional Fighters League ===
On February 21, 2025, the promotion officially revealed that Magomedov was join the 2025 PFL Bantamweight Tournament.

In the quarterfinal, Magomedov was scheduled to face Leandro Higo on April 11, 2025, at PFL 2. However, Magomedov withdrew from the tournament due to injury and was replaced by Josh Rettinghouse.

In a tournament alternate bout, Magomedov faced Sarvarjon Khamidov on June 20, 2025, at PFL 6. He won the bout via unanimous decision.

Magomedov faced former Bellator Bantamweight Champion Sergio Pettis on October 3, 2025, at PFL Champions Series 3. He lost the bout via knockout in the second round.

Magomedov faced Leandro Higo on May 2, 2026, at PFL Sioux Falls. At the weigh-ins, Magomedov weighed in at 136.8 pounds, 0.8 pounds over the bantamweight non-title fight limit and he was fined a percentage of his purse, which went to Higo. He won the fight via split decision.

Magomedov faced Daniel Marcos on August 22, 2026, at PFL Tampa. He lost the fight via technical knockout in round three after being rendered unable to continue due to a shoulder injury.

== Championships and accomplishments ==
- Absolute Championship Berkut
  - ACB Bantamweight Championship (One time)
    - One successful title defense

== Mixed martial arts record ==
Professional record breakdown
28 matches	22 wins	6 losses
By knockout	4	2
By submission	10	1
By decision	8	3

Res.	Record	Opponent	Method	Event	Date	Round	Time	Location	Notes
Loss	22–6	Daniel Marcos	TKO (corner stoppage)	PFL Tampa: Cyborg vs. Vieira	August 22, 2026	3	0:11	Tampa, Florida, United States	
Win	22–5	Leandro Higo	Decision (split)	PFL Sioux Falls: Storley vs. Zendeli	May 2, 2026	3	5:00	Sioux Falls, South Dakota, United States	Catchweight (136.8 lb) bout; Magomedov missed weight.
Loss	21–5	Sergio Pettis	KO (spinning back elbow and punch)	PFL Champions Series 3	October 3, 2025	2	4:31	Dubai, United Arab Emirates	
Win	21–4	Sarvarjon Khamidov	Decision (unanimous)	PFL 6 (2025)	June 20, 2025	3	5:00	Wichita, Kansas, United States	2025 PFL Bantamweight Tournament Alternate bout.
Loss	20–4	Patchy Mix	Decision (split)	Bellator Champions Series 2	May 17, 2024	5	5:00	Paris, France	For the Bellator Bantamweight World Championship.
Win	20–3	Danny Sabatello	Submission (guillotine choke)	Bellator MMA x Rizin 2	July 30, 2023	1	3:55	Saitama, Japan	
Loss	19–3	Patchy Mix	Technical Submission (guillotine choke)	Bellator 289	December 9, 2022	2	2:39	Uncasville, Connecticut, United States	Bellator Bantamweight World Grand Prix Semifinal.
Win	19–2	Enrique Barzola	Submission (guillotine choke)	Bellator 282	June 24, 2022	4	1:27	Uncasville, Connecticut, United States	Bellator Bantamweight World Grand Prix Quarterfinal.
Loss	18–2	Raufeon Stots	Decision (unanimous)	Bellator 264	August 13, 2021	3	5:00	Uncasville, Connecticut, United States	
Win	18–1	Cee Jay Hamilton	Submission (rear-naked choke)	Bellator 255	April 2, 2021	2	1:22	Uncasville, Connecticut, United States	
Win	17–1	Matheus Mattos	Decision (unanimous)	Bellator 254	December 10, 2020	3	5:00	Uncasville, Connecticut, United States	
Win	16–1	Walter Pereira Jr.	Submission (guillotine choke)	ACB 90	November 10, 2018	1	4:41	Moscow, Russia	
Win	15–1	Edgar Skriver	Decision (unanimous)	ACB 83	March 24, 2018	3	5:00	Baku, Azerbaijan	
Win	14–1	Dean Garnett	Submission (guillotine choke)	ACB 67	August 19, 2017	1	4:09	Grozny, Russia	
Loss	13–1	Petr Yan	Decision (unanimous)	ACB 57	April 15, 2017	5	5:00	Moscow, Russia	Lost the ACB Bantamweight Championship.
Win	13–0	Oleg Borisov	Submission (guillotine choke)	ACB 50	December 18, 2016	4	4:50	Saint Petersburg, Russia	Defended the ACB Bantamweight Championship. Submission of the Night.
Win	12–0	Petr Yan	Decision (split)	ACB 32	March 26, 2016	5	5:00	Moscow, Russia	Won the inaugural ACB Bantamweight Championship. Fight of the Night.
Win	11–0	Bruno Dias	Decision (unanimous)	ACB 24	October 24, 2015	3	5:00	Moscow, Russia	Bantamweight debut.
Win	10–0	Artur Kascheev	TKO (punches)	ACB 18	May 23, 2015	1	2:31	Grozny, Russia	
Win	9–0	Paata Robakidze	Decision (unanimous)	M-1 Challenge 48	May 24, 2014	3	5:00	Astana, Kazakhstan	Fight of the Night.
Win	8–0	Yuri Maia	TKO (punches)	M-1 Challenge 44	November 30, 2013	3	2:12	Tula, Russia	
Win	7–0	Anton Vasiliev	Submission (armbar)	M-1 Challenge 40	June 8, 2013	1	2:25	Dzheyrakh, Russia	
Win	6–0	Damian Stasiak	Decision (unanimous)	M-1 Challenge 37	February 27, 2013	3	5:00	Orenburg, Russia	
Win	5–0	Yakub Tangiev	KO (punch)	ProFC 45	December 15, 2012	1	2:35	Grozny, Russia	Lightweight bout.
Win	4–0	Kutmanbek Ashirov	TKO (punches)	Pride Of Caucasus 2012	September 23, 2012	2	2:35	Khasavyurt, Russia	
Win	3–0	Agil Ragimov	Submission (rear-naked choke)	Ultimatum MMA 1	March 26, 2012	2	1:45	Saratov, Russia	Featherweight debut.
Win	2–0	Garun Dibirov	Submission (armbar)	Legion Fight 10	March 10, 2012	1	2:25	Salsk, Russia	Welterweight debut.
Win	1–0	Ivan Prokopenko	Submission (guillotine choke)	M-1: International Club Grand Prix	April 2, 2011	1	1:27	Kyiv, Ukraine	Lightweight debut.

== See also ==
- List of current Bellator fighters
- List of male mixed martial artists
