= Bellator 286 =

Bellator mixed martial arts event in 2022

Bellator 286: Pitbull vs. Borics
- The poster for Bellator 286: Pitbull vs. Borics
- Promotion: Bellator MMA
- Date: October 1, 2022
- Venue: Long Beach Arena
- City: Long Beach, California, United States

Event chronology
Bellator 285: Henderson vs. Queally	Bellator 286: Pitbull vs. Borics	Bellator 287: Piccolotti vs. Barnaoui

Bellator 286: Pitbull vs. Borics was a mixed martial arts event produced by Bellator MMA that took place on October 1, 2022, at the Long Beach Arena in Long Beach, California, United States.

== Background ==
The event marked the promotion's second visit to Long Beach and first since Bellator 106 in November 2013.

A Bellator Featherweight World Championship between current three-time champion (also former Bellator Lightweight World Champion) Patrício Pitbull and Ádám Borics headlined the event.

The co-main event featured a lightweight bout between former Bellator Featherweight Champion A. J. McKee and Spike Carlyle.

At weigh ins, the bout between Juan Archuleta and Enrique Barzola was moved to a catchweight of 141 pounds; while two fighters missed weight; Spike Carlyle, was .6 pounds over the division non-title fight limit at 156.6 lbs, and Dominic Clark, who came in at 2.2 pounds over the limit at 158.2 lbs for his lightweight bout. Carlyle and Clark were fined 20% of their purses and the bouts continued at catchweights.

A Lightweight bout between Mike Hamel and Max Rohskopf was planned for the event; however it was scrapped the day of the event as Rohskopf was not cleared by doctors.

== Results ==
Main Card (Showtime)
Weight class				Method	Round	Time	Notes
Featherweight	Patrício Pitbull (c)	def.	Ádám Borics	Decision (unanimous) (48–47, 49–46, 50–45)	5	5:00	(Note: For the Bellator Featherweight World Championship)
Catchweight (156.6 lbs)	A. J. McKee	def.	Spike Carlyle	Decision (unanimous) (29–26, 30–26, 30–27)	3	5:00	(Note: Originally a lightweight bout; Carlyle missed weight)
Featherweight	Jeremy Kennedy	def.	Aaron Pico	TKO (shoulder injury)	1	5:00
Catchweight (141 lbs)	Juan Archuleta	def.	Enrique Barzola	Decision (unanimous) (30-27, 30-27, 30-27)	3	5:00
Preliminary card (Youtube/Pluto TV)
Bantamweight	Bobby Seronio III	def.	Miguel Peimbert	Decision (unanimous) (30-27, 30-27, 30-27)	3	5:00
Lightweight	Islam Mamedov	def.	Nick Browne	Decision (unanimous) (30–27, 30–27, 30–27)	3	5:00
Lightweight	Jay Jay Wilson	def.	Vladimir Tokov	Decision (split) (29–28, 28–29, 29–28)	3	5:00
Middleweight	Khalid Murtazaliev	def.	Khadzhimurat Bestaev	TKO (punches)	2	3:02
Women's Flyweight	Sumiko Inaba	def.	Nadine Mandiau	Decision (unanimous) (29–28, 30–27, 30–27)	3	5:00
Featherweight	Weber Almeida	def.	Ryan Lilley	Decision (split) (29–28, 28–29, 29–28)	3	5:00
Catchweight (158.2 lbs)	Lance Gibson Jr.	def.	Dominic Clark	Submission (triangle choke)	1	1:49	(Note: Originally a lightweight bout; Clark missed weight)
Bantamweight	Cee Jay Hamilton	def.	Richard Palencia	TKO (leg injury)	2	0:12
Postliminary card (Youtube)
Lightweight	Keoni Diggs	def.	Ricardo Seixas	Decision (unanimous) (29–28, 30–27, 30–27)	3	5:00

== Reported payout ==
The following is the reported payout to the fighters as reported to the California State Athletic Commission. The amounts do not include sponsor money, discretionary bonuses, viewership points or additional earnings.

- Patrício Pitbull: $150,000 (no win bonus) vs. Ádám Borics: $100,000
- A.J. McKee: $105,000 (no win bonus, $5,000 fine from Carlyle) def. Spike Carlyle: $40,000 (includes $10,000 deduction)
- Jeremy Kennedy: $110,000 (includes $55,000 win bonus) def. Aaron Pico: $100,000
- Juan Archuleta: $100,000 (no win bonus) def. Enrique Barzola: $31,000
- Bobby Seronio III $6,000 (includes $55,000 win bonus) def. Miguel Peimbert: $3,000
- Islam Mamedov: $80,000 (includes $40,000 win bonus) def. Nick Browne: $24,000
- Jay Jay Wilson: $70,000 (includes $35,000 win bonus) def. Vladimir Tokov: $23,000
- Khalid Murtazaliev: $40,000) (includes $20,000 win bonus) def. Khadzhimurat Bestaev: $13,000
- Sumiko Inaba: $24,000 (includes $12,000 win bonus) def. Nadine Mandiau: $3,000
- Weber Almeida: $36,000 (includes $18,000 win bonus) def. Ryan Lilley: $5,000
- Lance Gibson Jr.: $15,700 (no win bonus, $700 fine from Clark) def. Dominic Clark: $5,600 (includes $1,400 deduction)
- Cee Jay Hamilton: $30,000 (includes $15,000 win bonus) def. Richard Palencia: $15,000
- Keoni Diggs: $26,000 (includes $13,000 win bonus) def. Ricardo Seixas: $12,000

== See also ==
- 2022 in Bellator MMA
- List of Bellator MMA events
- List of current Bellator fighters
