= Patchy Mix =

American mixed martial arts fighter

- Born: Patrick Ethan Mix; August 16, 1993 (age 33); Angola, New York, U.S.
- Height: 5 ft 11 in (180 cm)
- Weight: 135 lb (61 kg; 9 st 9 lb)
- Division: Bantamweight
- Reach: 71 1/2 in (182 cm)
- Stance: Southpaw
- Fighting out of: Buffalo, New York, U.S.
- Team: Xtreme Couture (2020–present); Jackson Wink MMA (2017–2020); WNY MMA & Fitness
- Rank: Black belt in Brazilian Jiu-Jitsu
- Years active: 2016–present

Mixed martial arts record
- Total: 25
- Wins: 20
- By knockout: 2
- By submission: 13
- By decision: 5
- Losses: 5
- By knockout: 1
- By decision: 4

Amateur record
- Total: 11
- Wins: 11
- By knockout: 2
- By submission: 6
- By decision: 3
- Losses: 0

Other information
- Children: 1
- Mixed martial arts record from Sherdog

Patrick Ethan "Patchy" Mix (born August 16, 1993) is an American professional mixed martial artist who competes in the Bantamweight division and is currently signed with the Rizin Fighting Federation. Mix first gained prominence in Bellator MMA, where he became the final Bellator Bantamweight Champion and won the 2023 Bellator Bantamweight World Grand Prix Tournament. Mix also had a brief stint with the Ultimate Fighting Championship (UFC) in 2025.

== Background ==
Mix was born in Angola, New York, a small village approximately 20 miles outside of Buffalo. Mix was born prematurely before his due date at just 1 lb 8 oz (680 g).

Growing up, Mix was a lot smaller than other kids his age, Mix's household, consisting of his mom and three siblings, also did not have much money.

As Mix described his childhood, “We didn't really have a lot growing up, my mom had food stamps and stuff, I just remember various ways to get money. I'd sell my school lunch to get a dollar, I'd go and beat up another kid in an arranged fight for 20 bucks. I'd play football for 20 bucks. Then I'd go and buy bread, eggs and milk and stuff. We just had to find a way."

Mix began wrestling in the eighth grade, joining the Lake Shore High School wrestling team. With only two years of wrestling experience under his belt, Mix became a state qualifier in his weight class in the tenth grade, and in the process became the first wrestler from Lake Shore High to make the state tournament in over 40 years. Mix graduated from Lake Shore Senior High School in 2011, and his senior quote was "Luck is when preparation meets opportunity. Six minutes on the mat is all that matters."

== Mixed martial arts career ==
=== King of the Cage ===
Making his pro debut in May 2016, Mix began regularly fighting for the King of the Cage promotion. Mix went undefeated in the promotion, going 9–0 and he became KOTC Bantamweight champion after defeating future UFC bantamweight Andre Ewell by submission.

=== Bellator MMA ===
After having championship success in King of the Cage, Mix was signed by Bellator MMA. He made his promotional debut on June 14, 2019 at Bellator 222, facing highly touted prospect Ricky Bandejas. Mix was victorious rather quickly, showing a superior ground game and submitting Bandejas with a rear-naked choke just 66 seconds into the first round.

Mix was next scheduled to face Dominic Mazzotta on October 26, 2019 at Bellator 232. However, Mazzotta withdrew from the bout and was replaced by Isaiah Chapman. Mix once again showed dominance on the ground, submitting Chapman with a Suloev stretch kneebar in the first round.

For Mix's next bout, he fought in the Rizin Fighting Federation, representing Bellator in a card that featured RIZIN fighters against Bellator fighters. He took on Yuki Motoya at RIZIN 20 on December 31, 2019. He was victorious via first round submission. Subsequently, Mix signed his second multi-fight contract with Bellator.

After racking up three straight first round victories as part of the Bellator promotion, Mix was linked to a fight against Juan Archuleta for the vacant Bellator MMA Bantamweight World Championship at Bellator 242. However, Archuleta tested positive for COVID-19 and the bout was delayed. The bout was rebooked and took place at Bellator 246 on September 12, 2020. Mix lost the bout via unanimous decision, thus facing defeat for the first time in either his amateur or professional MMA career.

Mix was expected to face James Gallagher at Bellator 258 on May 7, 2021. However, Gallagher withdrew from the bout. UFC alum Albert Morales was announced as a replacement. Mix won the bout via arm-triangle choke in the third round.

The bout against James Gallagher was rescheduled for Bellator 270 on November 5, 2021. At the weigh-ins, Mix missed weight for his bout, weighing in at 137.8 pounds, 1.7 pounds over the bantamweight non-title fight limit. The bout proceeded at catchweight and Mix was fined a percentage of his purse which went to Gallagher. Mix won the fight via guillotine choke submission in the third round.

==== Bellator Bantamweight World Grand Prix ====
In the first round bout of the $1 million Bellator Bantamweight World Grand Prix Tournament, Mix faced Kyoji Horiguchi on April 23, 2022 at Bellator 279. He won the bout via unanimous decision and moved on to the next round.

In the semi-finals, Mix faced Magomed Magomedov on December 9, 2022 at Bellator 289. He was victorious via second round technical submission and advanced to the final round of the tournament.

In the finals, Mix faced Raufeon Stots for the Interim Bellator Bantamweight World Championship on April 22, 2023 at Bellator 295. He won the bout, the title, and the $1 million prize, knocking out Stots with a step up knee in the first round.

==== Bellator Bantamweight Championship ====
Mix faced reigning Bellator Bantamweight World Champion Sergio Pettis in a title unification bout on November 17, 2023 at Bellator 301. He won the bout and unified the belt, submitting Pettis in the second round via rear-naked choke.

As his first title defense, Mix faced Magomed Magomedov in a rematch on May 17, 2024 at Bellator 303. He won the bout via split decision.

Mix was scheduled to make the second defense of his title against Leandro Higo on November 16, 2024, at Bellator Champions Series 6. However, this event was later cancelled due to unspecified reasons.

On May 13, 2025, it was announced that Mix and PFL had mutually parted ways.

=== Ultimate Fighting Championship ===
On May 14, 2025, it was announced that Mix had signed with the Ultimate Fighting Championship and replacing Marlon Vera, who withdrew due to unknown reasons, Mix faced Mario Bautista on June 7, 2025 at UFC 316. Mix lost the fight by unanimous decision.

Mix faced former KSW Bantamweight Champion and promotional newcomer Jakub Wikłacz on October 4, 2025, at UFC 320. He lost the fight by split decision. 12 out of 17 media outlets scored the bout for Mix.

On January 28, 2026, it was announced that Mix had been released from the UFC.

=== Rizin Fighting Federation ===
Following his release, Mix signed with RIZIN and is scheduled to return to the featherweight division to face Kyoma Akimoto on March 7, 2026 at Rizin 52. He lost the fight by technical knockout in the second round.

== Professional grappling career ==
Mix faced Kairat Akhmetov in the main event of ADXC 6 on October 25, 2024. He won the match by unanimous decision.

== Personal life ==
Mix has a daughter, born in 2018, from a previous relationship. He is currently engaged to Tatiana Suarez. Mix has an older brother with intellectual disabilities who helps serve as inspiration for Mix.

== Championships and accomplishments ==
- Bellator MMA
  - Bellator Bantamweight World Championship (One time; final)
    - One successful title defense
  - Interim Bellator Bantamweight World Championship (One time)
  - Bellator Bantamweight World Grand Prix Tournament (2023)
  - Most stoppage wins in Bellator Bantamweight division history (six)
  - Most submission wins in Bellator Bantamweight division history (five)
- King of the Cage
  - KOTC Bantamweight Championship (One time; former)
    - Two successful title defenses
- ESPN
  - 2023 Non-UFC Male Fighter of the Year
- MMA Junkie
  - 2021 November Submission of the Month vs. James Gallagher
- MMA Fighting
  - 2023 First Team MMA All-Star
- MMA Mania
  - 2023 #5 Ranked Fighter of the Year

== Mixed martial arts record ==
Professional record breakdown
25 matches	20 wins	5 losses
By knockout	2	1
By submission	13	0
By decision	5	4

Res.	Record	Opponent	Method	Event	Date	Round	Time	Location	Notes
Loss	20–5	Shoko Sato	Decision (unanimous)	Rizin 54	August 11, 2026	3	5:00	Tokyo, Japan	Catchweight (140.7 lb) bout; originally a win for Mix, overturned to loss after point deduction for missing weight.
Loss	20–4	Kyoma Akimoto	TKO (punches and soccer kicks)	Rizin 52	March 7, 2026	2	0:37	Tokyo, Japan	Featherweight bout.
Loss	20–3	Jakub Wikłacz	Decision (split)	UFC 320	October 4, 2025	3	5:00	Las Vegas, Nevada, United States	
Loss	20–2	Mario Bautista	Decision (unanimous)	UFC 316	June 7, 2025	3	5:00	Newark, New Jersey, United States	
Win	20–1	Magomed Magomedov	Decision (split)	Bellator Champions Series 2	May 17, 2024	5	5:00	Paris, France	Defended the Bellator Bantamweight World Championship.
Win	19–1	Sergio Pettis	Submission (rear-naked choke)	Bellator 301	November 17, 2023	2	1:51	Chicago, Illinois, United States	Won and unified the Bellator Bantamweight World Championship.
Win	18–1	Raufeon Stots	KO (knee)	Bellator 295	April 22, 2023	1	1:20	Honolulu, Hawaii, United States	Won the Bellator Bantamweight World Grand Prix and the interim Bellator Bantamweight World Championship.
Win	17–1	Magomed Magomedov	Technical Submission (guillotine choke)	Bellator 289	December 9, 2022	2	2:39	Uncasville, Connecticut, United States	Bellator Bantamweight World Grand Prix Semifinal.
Win	16–1	Kyoji Horiguchi	Decision (unanimous)	Bellator 279	April 23, 2022	5	5:00	Honolulu, Hawaii, United States	Bellator Bantamweight World Grand Prix Quarterfinal.
Win	15–1	James Gallagher	Submission (guillotine choke)	Bellator 270	November 5, 2021	3	0:39	Dublin, Ireland	Catchweight (137.8 lb) bout; Mix missed weight.
Win	14–1	Albert Morales	Submission (arm-triangle choke)	Bellator 258	May 7, 2021	3	2:40	Uncasville, Connecticut, United States	
Loss	13–1	Juan Archuleta	Decision (unanimous)	Bellator 246	September 12, 2020	5	5:00	Uncasville, Connecticut, United States	For the vacant Bellator Bantamweight World Championship.
Win	13–0	Yuki Motoya	Submission (guillotine choke)	Rizin 20	December 31, 2019	1	1:37	Saitama, Japan	
Win	12–0	Isaiah Chapman	Submission (Suloev stretch)	Bellator 232	October 26, 2019	1	3:49	Uncasville, Connecticut, United States	Catchweight (136.25 lb) bout; Chapman missed weight.
Win	11–0	Ricky Bandejas	Submission (rear-naked choke)	Bellator 222	June 14, 2019	1	1:06	New York City, New York, United States	
Win	10–0	Turrell Galloway	TKO (elbows and punches)	KOTC: Combat Zone	February 23, 2019	1	1:45	Niagara Falls, New York, United States	
Win	9–0	Keith Richardson	Submission (kneebar)	KOTC: In the Mix	November 10, 2018	3	3:29	Salamanca, New York, United States	Defended the KOTC Flyweight Championship (135 lb).
Win	8–0	Fard Muhammad	Submission (rear-naked choke)	KOTC: Territorial Conflict	September 15, 2018	3	3:48	Niagara Falls, New York, United States	Non-title bout.
Win	7–0	Tony Gravely	Submission (guillotine choke)	KOTC: No Retreat	May 12, 2018	1	1:44	Salamanca, New York, United States	Defended the KOTC Flyweight Championship (135 lb).
Win	6–0	Andre Ewell	Submission (rear-naked choke)	KOTC: Ultimate Mix	November 18, 2017	1	2:28	Las Vegas, Nevada, United States	Return to Bantamweight. Won the vacant KOTC Flyweight Championship (135 lb).
Win	5–0	Jesse Bazzi	Decision (unanimous)	KOTC: Counterstrike	August 12, 2017	3	5:00	Niagara Falls, New York, United States	Flyweight debut.
Win	4–0	Nicholas Gonzalez	Decision (unanimous)	KOTC: Public Offense	May 6, 2017	3	5:00	Salamanca, New York, United States	
Win	3–0	Alberto Martinez Jr.	Submission (rear-naked choke)	KOTC: Raw Deal	February 25, 2017	1	0:51	Niagara Falls, New York, United States	
Win	2–0	Noel Arcibal	Submission (rear-naked choke)	KOTC: National Dispute	September 24, 2016	1	2:55	Niagara Falls, New York, United States	Bantamweight debut.
Win	1–0	Tobias Taylor	Decision (unanimous)	Prodigy MMA: Resurrection	May 28, 2016	3	5:00	Erie, Pennsylvania, United States	Featherweight debut.

== See also ==
- List of male mixed martial artists
