= Enrique Barzola =

Peruvian mixed martial artist (born 1989)

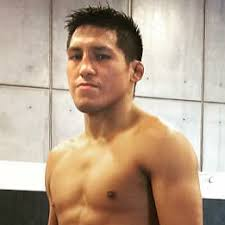
- Born: Enrique Johnatan Barzola Acosta; 28 April 1989 (age 37); Lima, Peru
- Other names: El Fuerte
- Height: 5 ft 7 in (1.70 m)
- Weight: 145 lb (66 kg; 10 st 5 lb)
- Division: Featherweight; Bantamweight (2020-present)
- Reach: 70 in (178 cm)
- Style: Wrestling, Luta Livre, Kickboxing, Brazilian Jiu Jitsu
- Fighting out of: Lima, Peru
- Team: American Top Team (2015–2019); American Kickboxing Academy (2019–present)
- Rank: Black belt in Luta Livre under Ivan Iberico
- Years active: 2012–present

Mixed martial arts record
- Total: 36
- Wins: 23
- By knockout: 5
- By submission: 6
- By decision: 12
- Losses: 11
- By knockout: 2
- By submission: 1
- By decision: 8
- Draws: 2

Other information
- Mixed martial arts record from Sherdog

Enrique Johnatan Barzola Acosta (born 28 April 1989) is a Peruvian mixed martial artist who competes in the Bantamweight and Featherweight divisions of Absolute Championship Akhmat (ACA). He was the lightweight winner on The Ultimate Fighter: Latin America 2 and he competed in both Bellator MMA and the Ultimate Fighting Championship (UFC).

== Background ==
Barzola was born in Lima, Peru. He was graphic designer and studied architecture in college briefly prior to fighting professionally in MMA.

Barzola was a wrestler and never thought that he would become a professional fighter, due to money being scarce to pay for MMA lessons. He has enjoyed mixed martial arts from a young age, watching Cain Velasquez and Fedor Emelianenko on YouTube. He transitioned from wrestling to mixed martial arts when he was 22. After six months of training, he announced that he would one day fight in UFC where he was laughed at by his gym mates, and four years later he became the winner of “The Ultimate Fighter: Latin America 2".

== Mixed martial arts career ==
=== Early career ===
Barzola began his professional mixed martial arts career in 2012.

While on the regional circuit in South America, he competed primarily in his home country of Peru. He amassed a record of 10-2-1 prior joining UFC.

=== The Ultimate Fighter: Latin America 2 ===
Barzola was selected as one of the cast members for The Ultimate Fighter: Latin America 2, UFC The Ultimate Fighter TV series, under Team Efraín Escudero in April 2015.

In the elimination round, Barzola defeated the Chilean Jonathan Ortega by unanimous decision. Barzola next faced Paraguayan Cesar Arzamendia in the semifinals and won by submission in round one. He moved on to face Horacio Gultierrez in the finals at UFC Fight Night: Magny vs. Gastelum.

=== Ultimate Fighting Championship ===
Barzola made his promotional debut on 21 November 2015 at The Ultimate Fighter Latin America 2 Finale. He faced Horacio Gutierrez in the finals for The Ultimate Fighter: Latin America 2. He defeated Gutierrez via unanimous decision (30-27, 30–27, 30–27).

He next faced Kyle Bochniak on 27 August 2016 at UFC on Fox: Maia vs. Condit. He lost via split decision. He stated after the fight that he disagreed with the judges decision saying "It was a very bad decision because everyone saw that I won. I connected more, I was more active and pressed all the time. I will correct some errors without considering this duel as a defeat". 14 out of 14 media scores gave it to Barzola.

His third fight in UFC was against Chris Avila on 5 November 2016 at The Ultimate Fighter Latin America 3 Finale. He picked up a win via unanimous decision.

On 13 May 2017, Barzola took up Gabriel Benítez at UFC 211. After three rounds, judges awarded the win to Barzola via unanimous decision with (29-28) across the score board.

Barzola faced Arnold Allen at UFC 220 on 20 January 2018. However, Allen was pulled from the fight on 11 January due to alleged visa issues which restricted his ability to travel, and he was replaced by Matt Bessette. Barzola won the fight by unanimous decision.

Barzola faced Brandon Davis on 19 May 2018 at UFC Fight Night 129. He won the fight by unanimous decision.

Barzola was expected to face Nad Narimani on 17 November 2018 at UFC Fight Night 140. However, on 25 October 2018, it was reported that Barzola pulled out of the fight due to arm injury.

Barzola faced Kevin Aguilar on 30 March 2019 at UFC on ESPN 2. He lost the fight via unanimous decision.

Barzola faced Bobby Moffett on 10 August 2019 at UFC on ESPN+ 14. He won the fight via split decision. 7 out of 12 media scores gave it to Barzola.

Barzola faced Movsar Evloev on 26 October 2019 at UFC on ESPN+ 20. He lost the fight via unanimous decision. 4 out of 9 media scores gave it to Barzola.

Barzola faced Rani Yahya on 14 March 2020 at UFC Fight Night 170. After a back-and-forth three rounds, the judges declared the bout a majority draw decision.

After fighting out his four-year and 10-fight contract, he was not re-signed and became a free agent.

=== Bellator MMA ===
On 11 August 2021, it was announced that Barzola signed a multifight contract with Bellator.

Barzola made his promotional debut against Darrion Caldwell on January 29, 2022, at Bellator 273. He won the bout via ground and pound TKO in the third round.

Barzola was scheduled to face Josh Hill on April 22, 2022, at Bellator 278. Due to the pull out of two fighters from the Bellator Bantamweight World Grand Prix due to injuries, the bout was changed to a wild card qualifier for one of the spots in the tournament. Due to Covid, Hill had to pull out of the bout and was replaced by Nikita Mikhailov. He won the bout in dominant fashion via unanimous decision.

Barzola faced Magomed Magomedov in the quarterfinals of the Bellator Bantamweight World Grand Prix on June 24, 2022, at Bellator 282. He lost the bout via guillotine choke in the fourth round, losing for the first time via stoppage in his career.

Barzola faced Juan Archuleta on October 1, 2022, at Bellator 286. At weigh ins, the bout was moved to a catchweight of 141 pounds. In a fast-paced bout, Barzola lost the bout via unanimous decision.

Barzola faced Erik Pérez on March 10, 2023, at Bellator 292. He won the fight by unanimous decision.

Barzola faced Jaylon Bates on August 11, 2023, at Bellator 298. He won the fight via unanimous decision.

=== PFL ===
In his PFL debut, Barzola faced Ádám Borics on April 19, 2024 at PFL 3 (2024). He lost the bout via unanimous decision.

Barzola next faced Timur Khizriev at PFL 6 (2024) on June 28, 2024, losing the fight via unanimous decision.

Barzola faced Tyler Diamond on August 23, 2024 at PFL 9. He won the fight by unanimous decision.

== Championships and accomplishments ==
=== Mixed martial arts ===
- Ultimate Fighting Championship
  - The Ultimate Fighter: Latin America 2 Lightweight Tournament Winner
  - Fifth most takedowns landed in UFC Featherweight division history (36)

== Personal life ==
Barzola's moniker "El Fuerte" means "The Fort / The Strong" in English and he considers himself as "The Fort of El Agustino" (El Agustino, a district of Lima) - a humble person who fights for his dream.

Barzola appeared in the Reebok "Be More Human" Latin America advertising campaign.

His favorite fighter is Stipe Miocic.

He is also a Christian, and nicknames himself "Guerrero de Cristo" (Warrior for Christ), as this nickname is also written on a Peruvian flag that is usually shown in the cage.

== Mixed martial arts record ==
Professional record breakdown
| 36 matches | 23 wins | 11 losses |
| By knockout | 5 | 2 |
| By submission | 6 | 1 |
| By decision | 12 | 8 |
| Draws | 2 | |

| Res. | Record | Opponent | Method | Event | Date | Round | Time | Location | Notes |
|---|---|---|---|---|---|---|---|---|---|
| Loss | 23–11–2 | Saifullah Dzhabrailov | TKO (punches) | ACA 206 | August 15, 2026 | 1 | 1:22 | Moscow, Russia | |
| Loss | 23–10–2 | Makharbek Karginov | TKO (punches) | ACA 197 | December 5, 2025 | 1 | 1:18 | Moscow, Russia | |
| Win | 23–9–2 | Marat Balaev | Submission (rear-naked choke) | ACA 190 | August 15, 2025 | 3 | 1:25 | Moscow, Russia | |
| Win | 22–9–2 | Kafiz Sakibekov | Technical Submission (guillotine choke) | ACA 187 | June 6, 2025 | 3 | 1:03 | Moscow, Russia | |
| Win | 21–9–2 | Tyler Diamond | Decision (unanimous) | PFL 9 (2024) | August 23, 2024 | 3 | 5:00 | Washington, D.C., United States | 2024 PFL Featherweight Tournament Alternate bout. |
| Loss | 20–9–2 | Timur Khizriev | Decision (unanimous) | PFL 6 (2024) | June 28, 2024 | 3 | 5:00 | Sioux Falls, South Dakota, United States | |
| Loss | 20–8–2 | Ádám Borics | Decision (unanimous) | PFL 3 (2024) | April 19, 2024 | 3 | 5:00 | Chicago, Illinois, United States | Return to Featherweight. |
| Win | 20–7–2 | Jaylon Bates | Decision (unanimous) | Bellator 298 | August 11, 2023 | 3 | 5:00 | Sioux Falls, South Dakota, United States | |
| Win | 19–7–2 | Erik Pérez | Decision (unanimous) | Bellator 292 | March 10, 2023 | 3 | 5:00 | San Jose, California, United States | Featherweight bout. |
| Loss | 18–7–2 | Juan Archuleta | Decision (unanimous) | Bellator 286 | October 1, 2022 | 3 | 5:00 | Long Beach, California, United States | Catchweight (141 lb) bout. |
| Loss | 18–6–2 | Magomed Magomedov | Submission (guillotine choke) | Bellator 282 | June 24, 2022 | 4 | 1:27 | Uncasville, Connecticut, United States | Bellator Bantamweight World Grand Prix Quarterfinal. |
| Win | 18–5–2 | Nikita Mikhailov | Decision (unanimous) | Bellator 278 | April 22, 2022 | 3 | 5:00 | Honolulu, Hawaii, United States | Catchweight (140 lb) bout. Bellator Bantamweight World Grand Prix Wild Card Qualifier. |
| Win | 17–5–2 | Darrion Caldwell | TKO (punches and elbows) | Bellator 273 | January 29, 2022 | 3 | 3:01 | Phoenix, Arizona, United States | |
| Draw | 16–5–2 | Rani Yahya | Draw (majority) | UFC Fight Night: Lee vs. Oliveira | March 14, 2020 | 3 | 5:00 | Brasília, Brazil | Bantamweight debut. |
| Loss | 16–5–1 | Movsar Evloev | Decision (unanimous) | UFC Fight Night: Maia vs. Askren | October 26, 2019 | 3 | 5:00 | Kallang, Singapore | |
| Win | 16–4–1 | Bobby Moffett | Decision (split) | UFC Fight Night: Shevchenko vs. Carmouche 2 | August 10, 2019 | 3 | 5:00 | Montevideo, Uruguay | |
| Loss | 15–4–1 | Kevin Aguilar | Decision (unanimous) | UFC on ESPN: Barboza vs. Gaethje | March 30, 2019 | 3 | 5:00 | Philadelphia, Pennsylvania, United States | |
| Win | 15–3–1 | Brandon Davis | Decision (unanimous) | UFC Fight Night: Maia vs. Usman | May 19, 2018 | 3 | 5:00 | Santiago, Chile | |
| Win | 14–3–1 | Matt Bessette | Decision (unanimous) | UFC 220 | January 20, 2018 | 3 | 5:00 | Boston, Massachusetts, United States | |
| Win | 13–3–1 | Gabriel Benítez | Decision (unanimous) | UFC 211 | May 13, 2017 | 3 | 5:00 | Dallas, Texas, United States | |
| Win | 12–3–1 | Chris Avila | Decision (unanimous) | The Ultimate Fighter Latin America 3 Finale: dos Anjos vs. Ferguson | November 5, 2016 | 3 | 5:00 | Mexico City, Mexico | |
| Loss | 11–3–1 | Kyle Bochniak | Decision (split) | UFC on Fox: Maia vs. Condit | August 27, 2016 | 3 | 5:00 | Vancouver, British Columbia, Canada | Return to Featherweight. |
| Win | 11–2–1 | Horacio Gutierrez | Decision (unanimous) | The Ultimate Fighter Latin America 2 Finale: Magny vs. Gastelum | November 21, 2015 | 3 | 5:00 | Monterrey, Mexico | Won The Ultimate Fighter: Latin America 2 Lightweight Tournament. |
| Win | 10–2–1 | Fernando Perez | TKO (punches) | Peru FC 18 | September 6, 2014 | 2 | 4:36 | Lima, Peru | |
| Loss | 9–2–1 | Martin Mollinedo | Decision (unanimous) | Fusion FC 9 | July 16, 2014 | 3 | 5:00 | Lima, Peru | |
| Win | 9–1–1 | Manuel Meza | Decision (unanimous) | Inka FC 26 | May 24, 2014 | 3 | 5:00 | Lima, Peru | |
| Win | 8–1–1 | Humberto Bandenay | Submission (rear-naked choke) | Inka FC 25 | April 16, 2014 | 2 | N/A | Lima, Peru | |
| Loss | 7–1–1 | Fernando Bruno | Decision (unanimous) | 300 Sparta 5 Grand Prix | February 4, 2014 | 2 | 5:00 | Lima, Peru | 300 Sparta Featherweight Grand Prix Semifinal. |
| Win | 7–0–1 | Marco Anatoly | TKO (punches) | 300 Sparta 5 Grand Prix | February 4, 2014 | 2 | N/A | Lima, Peru | 300 Sparta Featherweight Grand Prix Quarterfinal. |
| Win | 6–0–1 | Missael Silva de Souza | TKO (punches) | Show Fighting Enterprise 2 | November 30, 2013 | 2 | 2:25 | Quito, Ecuador | |
| Win | 5–0–1 | Joel Iglesias | TKO (punches) | Inka FC 24 | October 23, 2013 | 2 | 3:29 | Lima, Peru | |
| Win | 4–0–1 | Jorge Enciso | Submission (rear-naked choke) | 300 Sparta MMA 4 | October 10, 2013 | 1 | 0:00 | Lima, Peru | |
| Draw | 3–0–1 | Gonzalo Vallejo | Decision (unanimous) | 300 Sparta MMA 2 | July 17, 2013 | 3 | 5:00 | Lima, Peru | |
| Win | 3–0 | Emiliano Nielli | Submission (rear-naked choke) | Inka FC 21 | May 19, 2013 | 3 | 0:00 | Lima, Peru | |
| Win | 2–0 | Jorge Luis Figueroa Duran | Decision (unanimous) | 300 Sparta MMA 1 | April 24, 2013 | 3 | 5:00 | Lima, Peru | |
| Win | 1–0 | Arturo Frias | Submission (rear-naked choke) | Inka FC 19 | December 12, 2012 | 1 | 2:28 | Lima, Peru | Featherweight debut. |

== See also ==
- List of current ACA fighters
- List of male mixed martial artists
