= Sergio Pettis =

American mixed martial artist

- Born: Sergio Jerome Pettis; August 18, 1993 (age 33); Milwaukee, Wisconsin, U.S.
- Other names: The Phenom
- Height: 5 ft 6 in (1.68 m)
- Weight: 134 lb (61 kg; 9 st 8 lb)
- Division: Flyweight (125 lbs) (2012–2019); Bantamweight (135 lbs) (2011–2014, 2018–present)
- Reach: 69 in (175 cm)
- Fighting out of: Milwaukee, Wisconsin, U.S.
- Team: Roufusport (2007–present)
- Rank: 2nd dan black belt in Taekwondo; Black belt in Roufusport Kickboxing; Black belt in Brazilian Jiu-Jitsu under Daniel Wanderley
- Years active: 2011–present

Professional boxing record
- Total: 1
- Losses: 1

Mixed martial arts record
- Total: 34
- Wins: 25
- By knockout: 5
- By submission: 4
- By decision: 16
- Losses: 9
- By knockout: 1
- By submission: 2
- By decision: 6

Amateur record
- Total: 4
- Wins: 4
- By knockout: 2
- By submission: 1

Other information
- Notable relatives: Anthony Pettis (brother)
- Boxing record from BoxRec
- Mixed martial arts record from Sherdog

Sergio Jerome Pettis (born August 18, 1993) is an American mixed martial artist who is currently signed in the Professional Fighters League. Previously, he fought in Bellator, where he competed in the Bantamweight division and became the Bellator Bantamweight Champion. Earlier in his career, Pettis also competed in the Ultimate Fighting Championship (UFC), fighting in both Bantamweight and Flyweight divisions. As of April 21, 2026, he is #1 in the PFL bantamweight rankings.

== Background ==
Pettis was born to Annette (née Garcia) and Eugene Pettis Jr. in Milwaukee, Wisconsin. Along with his older brother former UFC Lightweight Champion Anthony Pettis, who competes in the lightweight division, and oldest brother Reynaldo Pettis, he grew up in the south side of Milwaukee, Wisconsin.

Pettis' mother is of Mexican descent and his father is of Puerto Rican descent. To escape prejudice, his grandpa Eugenio Pérez anglicised the family name from Pérez to Pettis. Pettis was a student at Pius XI High School.

Pettis' father was fatally stabbed by a robber on November 12, 2003, at a friend's residence.

== Mixed martial arts career ==
=== Early career ===
Pettis turned pro on September 10, 2011, against Kyle Vivian at Canadian Fighting Championship 7. He won via TKO in the first round.

On January 7, 2012, Sergio took on Mike Lindquist at Madtown Throwdown 26. He won via submission in round one.

Pettis fought Tom McKenna at LFC 53. He won via first round submission.

Pettis then took on Tony Zelinski at NAFC: Unleashed. He won via second-round TKO.

Pettis took on Chris Haney at NAFC: Colosseum. He won via unanimous decision.

In his next fight, Pettis defeated Jimmy Jones via unanimous decision at RFA 4-Griffin vs Escudero.

Pettis was originally set to face Matt Manzanares at Resurrection Fighting Alliance 7, but Manzanares was forced out of the bout due to injury. RFA could not find another opponent for Sergio, therefore the bout was scrapped. Pettis is now set to face Josh Robinson at NAFC: Battleground. Pettis improved his record to an unblemished 7–0 with the unanimous decision victory.

Resurrection Fighting Alliance announced that Pettis will take on UFC vet Jeff Curran for the inaugural RFA Flyweight Championship at RFA 8 on June 21, 2013, inside the historic The Rave/Eagles Club Milwaukee, Wisc. Curran was forced out of the bout for personal reasons, RFA President Ed Soares reported that Dillard Pegg will take his place and fight Pettis for the flyweight title. He won via KO in the first round to win the RFA flyweight title.

Pettis faced James Porter for the NAFC Bantamweight Championship, at NAFC: Battle in the Ballroom on September 28, 2013. Pettis won via first round submission and was subsequently signed by the UFC.

=== Ultimate Fighting Championship ===
Pettis was expected to make his promotional debut against Vaughan Lee in a bantamweight bout on November 16, 2013, at UFC 167. A week before the fight Lee was forced out of the bout due to injury and was replaced by Will Campuzano. Pettis won the fight via unanimous decision.

In his second UFC bout, Pettis faced Alex Caceres at UFC on Fox 10 on January 25, 2014. He lost the back-and-forth fight via rear-naked choke submission late in the third round. Despite the loss, Pettis won a Fight of the Night bonus award for the bout.

Pettis faced Yaotzin Meza on June 7, 2014, at UFC Fight Night 42. He won the fight via unanimous decision.

Pettis faced Matt Hobar on December 6, 2014, at UFC 181. He won the fight via unanimous decision. The bout also earned Pettis his second Fight of the Night bonus award.

Pettis faced Ryan Benoit in a flyweight bout on March 14, 2015, at UFC 185. After winning the first round, Pettis was dropped by left hook and finished off with a flurry of ground and pound from Benoit in the second round.

Pettis faced Chris Cariaso on October 3, 2015, at UFC 192. He won the fight via unanimous decision.

Pettis faced Chris Kelades on April 23, 2016, at UFC 197. Pettis won the fight by unanimous decision. Sergio was dominating most of the exchanges and defending takedowns by attacking the neck. He stunned Moraga many times and arguably won all 3 rounds. Pettis called out Jussier Formiga in his post fight interview.

Pettis was expected to face Louis Smolka on October 1, 2016, at UFC Fight Night 96. However, Pettis pulled out of the fight during the week leading up to the event citing what his trainer described as "a minor injury" and was replaced by promotional newcomer Brandon Moreno.

Pettis was expected to face Jussier Formiga on January 15, 2017, at UFC Fight Night 103. However, Formiga pulled out of the fight in late December and was replaced by John Moraga. He won the fight via unanimous decision.

Pettis was expected to face Henry Cejudo on May 13, 2017, at UFC 211. However, on May 10, Cejudo pulled out of the fight with a hand injury and the bout was canceled.

Pettis faced Brandon Moreno on August 5, 2017, in the main event at UFC Fight Night 114. He won the bout via unanimous decision.

A rescheduled fight with Cejudo took place on December 2, 2017, at UFC 218. Pettis lost the fight by unanimous decision.

Pettis faced Joseph Benavidez on June 9, 2018, at UFC 225. He won the back-and-forth fight via split decision.

Pettis faced Jussier Formiga on October 6, 2018, at UFC 229. He lost the fight via unanimous decision After the fight, Pettis' head coach Duke Roufus announced that Sergio is returning to the bantamweight division.

Pettis faced Rob Font in a bantamweight bout, on December 15, 2018, at UFC on Fox 31. He lost the fight via unanimous decision.

Pettis was expected to face Ricardo Ramos on June 29, 2019, at UFC on ESPN 3. However, on June 15, 2019, it was reported that Pettis pulled out of the bout due to injury.

Pettis was scheduled to face Alex Perez on September 21, 2019, at UFC on ESPN+ 17. However, Perez pulled out of the bout on August 26 citing an injury, and he was replaced by Tyson Nam. Pettis won the fight by unanimous decision.

Pettis was scheduled to face Kai Kara-France on December 14, 2019, at UFC 245. Later, news surfaced that Pettis fought out his contract with his previous fight with Nam, and is testing free agency.

=== Bellator MMA ===
On October 24, 2019, it was announced that Pettis signed a multi-fight deal with Bellator MMA. Pettis made his promotional debut at Bellator 238 on January 25, 2020, against Alfred Khashakyan. He was victorious via first round technical submission.

Pettis faced Ricky Bandejas on July 24 at Bellator 242. He won the bout via unanimous decision.

==== Bellator Bantamweight Championship ====
Pettis faced Juan Archuleta for the Bellator Bantamweight World Championship at Bellator 258 on May 7, 2021. Pettis won the bout and the title by unanimous decision.

Pettis made his first title defense against former Bellator Bantamweight Champion Kyoji Horiguchi on December 3, 2021, at Bellator 272. After losing the first three rounds, Pettis came back to win the fight via knockout in round four.

For his second title defense and also the first round bout of the $1 million Bellator Bantamweight World Grand Prix Tournament, Pettis was scheduled to face Raufeon Stots on April 23, 2022, at Bellator 279. However Pettis was forced to pull out of the bout and the Grand Prix after sustaining an injury that required surgery.

Pettis defended the Bellator Bantamweight World Championship against the reigning Bellator Featherweight World Champion Patrício Pitbull on June 16, 2023, at Bellator 297. He won the bout via unanimous decision.

Pettis faced interim champion Patchy Mix in a title unification bout on November 17, 2023, at Bellator 301. He lost the bout and the belt, being submitted in the second round via rear-naked choke.

=== Rizin Fighting Federation ===
Pettis made his MMA debut in Japan on June 9, 2024, as he faced Kyoji Horiguchi in a rematch at RIZIN 47. Pettis lost the bout via unanimous decision.

=== Professional Fighters League ===
In 2025, Pettis made his debut in the Professional Fighters League. He faced Raufeon Stots at PFL 7 on June 27, 2025. He won the fight via unanimous decision.

Pettis faced Magomed Magomedov at PFL Champions Series 3, on October 3, 2025. He won the bout via knockout in the second round.

Pettis faced Mitch McKee at PFL Chicago: Pettis vs. McKee, on April 11, 2026. He lost the bout via unanimous decision.

Pettis was scheduled to face Lewis McGrillen on July 18, 2026, at PFL Austin. However, Pettis withdrew due to an injury and was replaced by Rafael do Nascimento.

Pettis faced Jōji Gotō in a crossover fight between PFL and Rizin on November 14, 2026, at PFL Returns to Dubai. He lost the fight via unanimous decision.

== Freestyle wrestling ==
Pettis is scheduled to make his Real American Freestyle debut against Cody Garbrandt on November 28, 2026 at RAF 15.

== Personal life ==
Sergio is the younger brother of Anthony and Rey Pettis. Sergio graduated from Pius XI Catholic High School located in Milwaukee, WI in June 2011. On November 23, 2003, their father, Eugene Pettis Jr. was stabbed to death by a robber at a friend's house.

== Championships and accomplishments ==
=== Mixed martial arts ===
- Bellator MMA
  - Bellator Bantamweight World Championship (One time, Former)
    - Two successful title defenses
- Ultimate Fighting Championship
  - Fight of the Night (Two times) vs. Alex Caceres & Matt Hobar
  - UFC.com Awards
    - 2018: Ranked #5 Upset of the Year vs. Joseph Benavidez
- Resurrection Fighting Alliance
  - RFA Flyweight Championship (One time, First)
- North American Fighting Championship
  - NAFC Bantamweight Championship (One time)
- Cageside Press
  - Comeback of the Year 2021 (tied w/Charles Oliveira) vs. Kyoji Horiguchi
- ESPN
  - 2021 Finish of the Year vs. Kyoji Horiguchi
- CBS Sports
  - 2021 Bellator Knockout of the Year vs. Kyoji Horiguchi
  - 2021 Bellator Fighter of the Year (tied with A.J. McKee)
- MMA Junkie
  - 2021 December Knockout of the Month vs. Kyoji Horiguchi
  - 2021 Knockout of the Year vs. Kyoji Horiguchi
  - 2021 Comeback of the Year vs. Kyoji Horiguchi
- Sherdog
  - 2021 Knockout of the Year vs. Kyoji Horiguchi
- LowKick MMA
  - 2021 Comeback of the Year vs. Kyoji Horiguchi
- MMA Sucka
  - 2021 Knockout of the Year vs. Kyoji Horiguchi
  - 2021 Comeback of the Year vs. Kyoji Horiguchi
- Combat Press
  - 2021 Comeback of the Year vs. Kyoji Horiguchi
- Cageside Press
  - 2021 Comeback of the Year vs. Kyoji Horiguchi at Bellator 272 (tied with Charles Oliveira)
- MMA Fighting
  - 2025 #4 Ranked Knockout of the Year vs. Magomed Magomedov at PFL Champions Series 3
  - 2025 Third Team MMA All-Star
- Bleacher Report
  - 2014 #8 Ranked Fight of the Year vs. Alex Caceres at UFC on Fox: Henderson vs. Thomson
- Uncrowned
  - 2025 #2 Ranked Knockout of the Year vs. Magomed Magomedov at PFL Champions Series 3

== Mixed martial arts record ==
Professional record breakdown
34 matches	25 wins	9 losses
By knockout	5	1
By submission	4	2
By decision	16	6

Res.	Record	Opponent	Method	Event	Date	Round	Time	Location	Notes
Loss	25–9	Jōji Gotō	Decision (unanimous)	PFL Dubai: Nemkov vs. Bilostenniy	November 14, 2026	3	5:00	Dubai, United Arab Emirates	
Loss	25–8	Mitchell McKee	Decision (unanimous)	PFL Chicago: Pettis vs. McKee	April 11, 2026	3	5:00	Chicago, Illinois, United States	
Win	25–7	Magomed Magomedov	KO (spinning back elbow and punch)	PFL Champions Series 3	October 3, 2025	2	4:31	Dubai, United Arab Emirates	
Win	24–7	Raufeon Stots	Decision (unanimous)	PFL 7 (2025)	June 27, 2025	3	5:00	Chicago, Illinois, United States	
Loss	23–7	Kyoji Horiguchi	Decision (unanimous)	Rizin 47	June 9, 2024	3	5:00	Tokyo, Japan	
Loss	23–6	Patchy Mix	Submission (rear-naked choke)	Bellator 301	November 17, 2023	2	1:51	Chicago, Illinois, United States	Lost the Bellator Bantamweight World Championship.
Win	23–5	Patrício Pitbull	Decision (unanimous)	Bellator 297	June 16, 2023	5	5:00	Chicago, Illinois, United States	Defended the Bellator Bantamweight World Championship.
Win	22–5	Kyoji Horiguchi	KO (spinning backfist)	Bellator 272	December 3, 2021	4	3:24	Uncasville, Connecticut, United States	Defended the Bellator Bantamweight World Championship.
Win	21–5	Juan Archuleta	Decision (unanimous)	Bellator 258	May 7, 2021	5	5:00	Uncasville, Connecticut, United States	Won the Bellator Bantamweight World Championship.
Win	20–5	Ricky Bandejas	Decision (unanimous)	Bellator 242	July 24, 2020	3	5:00	Uncasville, Connecticut, United States	
Win	19–5	Alfred Khashakyan	Technical Submission (guillotine choke)	Bellator 238	January 25, 2020	1	3:00	Inglewood, California, United States	
Win	18–5	Tyson Nam	Decision (unanimous)	UFC Fight Night: Rodríguez vs. Stephens	September 21, 2019	3	5:00	Mexico City, Mexico	Flyweight bout.
Loss	17–5	Rob Font	Decision (unanimous)	UFC on Fox: Lee vs. Iaquinta 2	December 15, 2018	3	5:00	Milwaukee, Wisconsin, United States	Return to Bantamweight.
Loss	17–4	Jussier Formiga	Decision (unanimous)	UFC 229	October 6, 2018	3	5:00	Las Vegas, Nevada, United States	
Win	17–3	Joseph Benavidez	Decision (split)	UFC 225	June 9, 2018	3	5:00	Chicago, Illinois, United States	
Loss	16–3	Henry Cejudo	Decision (unanimous)	UFC 218	December 2, 2017	3	5:00	Detroit, Michigan, United States	
Win	16–2	Brandon Moreno	Decision (unanimous)	UFC Fight Night: Pettis vs. Moreno	August 5, 2017	5	5:00	Mexico City, Mexico	
Win	15–2	John Moraga	Decision (unanimous)	UFC Fight Night: Rodríguez vs. Penn	January 15, 2017	3	5:00	Phoenix, Arizona, United States	
Win	14–2	Chris Kelades	Decision (unanimous)	UFC 197	April 23, 2016	3	5:00	Las Vegas, Nevada, United States	
Win	13–2	Chris Cariaso	Decision (unanimous)	UFC 192	October 3, 2015	3	5:00	Houston, Texas, United States	
Loss	12–2	Ryan Benoit	TKO (punches)	UFC 185	March 14, 2015	2	1:34	Dallas, Texas, United States	Return to Flyweight.
Win	12–1	Matt Hobar	Decision (unanimous)	UFC 181	December 6, 2014	3	5:00	Las Vegas, Nevada, United States	Fight of the Night.
Win	11–1	Yaotzin Meza	Decision (unanimous)	UFC Fight Night: Henderson vs. Khabilov	June 7, 2014	3	5:00	Albuquerque, New Mexico, United States	
Loss	10–1	Alex Caceres	Submission (rear-naked choke)	UFC on Fox: Henderson vs. Thomson	January 25, 2014	3	4:39	Chicago, Illinois, United States	Fight of the Night.
Win	10–0	Will Campuzano	Decision (unanimous)	UFC 167	November 16, 2013	3	5:00	Las Vegas, Nevada, United States	
Win	9–0	James Porter	Submission (kimura)	North American FC: Battle in the Ballroom	September 28, 2013	1	2:33	Milwaukee, Wisconsin, United States	Return to Bantamweight. Won the NAFC Bantamweight Championship.
Win	8–0	Dillard Pegg	TKO (punches)	RFA 8	June 21, 2013	1	0:51	Milwaukee, Wisconsin, United States	Won the inaugural RFA Flyweight Championship.
Win	7–0	Josh Robinson	Decision (unanimous)	North American FC: Battleground	March 29, 2013	3	5:00	Milwaukee, Wisconsin, United States	Return to Flyweight.
Win	6–0	Jimmy Jones	Decision (unanimous)	RFA 4	November 2, 2012	3	5:00	Las Vegas, Nevada, United States	
Win	5–0	Tom McKenna	Submission (guillotine choke)	Legend of Fighting 53	June 16, 2012	1	3:52	Indianapolis, Indiana, United States	Return to Bantamweight.
Win	4–0	Chris Haney	Decision (unanimous)	North American FC: Colosseum	May 4, 2012	3	5:00	Milwaukee, Wisconsin, United States	Flyweight debut.
Win	3–0	Mike Lindquist	Submission (arm-triangle choke)	Madtown Throwdown 26	January 7, 2012	1	1:43	Madison, Wisconsin, United States	
Win	2–0	Tony Zelinski	TKO (head kick)	North American FC: Unleashed	November 18, 2011	2	1:59	Milwaukee, Wisconsin, United States	
Win	1–0	Kyle Vivian	TKO (head kick)	Canadian FC 7	September 10, 2011	1	1:46	Winnipeg, Manitoba, Canada	Bantamweight debut.

== Professional boxing record ==
1 fight	0 wins	1 loss
By decision	0	1

No.	Result	Record	Opponent	Type	Round, time	Date	Location	Notes
1	Loss	0–1	Sabari Jaishankar	UD	6	Mar 7, 2025	Quake Arena, Hyderabad, India	

== See also ==
- List of current Bellator fighters
- List of male mixed martial artists
