= Juliana Velasquez =

Brazilian mixed martial arts (MMA) fighter

- Born: Juliana Velasquez Tonasse; October 19, 1986 (age 39); Rio de Janeiro, Brazil
- Height: 5 ft 7 in (1.70 m)
- Weight: 125 lb (57 kg; 8.9 st)
- Division: Flyweight
- Reach: 67 1/2 in (171 cm)
- Style: Judo
- Stance: Southpaw
- Fighting out of: Rio de Janeiro, Brazil
- Team: Team Nogueira
- Rank: Black belt in Judo
- Years active: 2014–present

Mixed martial arts record
- Total: 18
- Wins: 14
- By knockout: 5
- By submission: 2
- By decision: 7
- Losses: 4
- By knockout: 1
- By submission: 2
- By decision: 1

Other information
- Mixed martial arts record from Sherdog

Juliana Velasquez Tonasse (born October 19, 1986) is a Brazilian professional mixed martial artist currently competing in the flyweight division of Bellator MMA, where she is the former Bellator Women's Flyweight World Champion.

== Background ==
Juliana Velasquez's father introduced her to the judo mats when she was only four years old. The young carioca entered high-level competition 11 years later, capturing a few medals in the South American judo circuit. After failing to win a spot on the Brazilian Olympic Judo team, at the age of 28, she decided to try her luck in the mixed martial arts world.

In 2013, she gained attention in Brazil for her part played in a polemic story about a fight between herself and male fighter Emerson Falcão, promoted by Shooto Brazil. After receiving a ton of criticism from the combat sports community for the promotion of a fight between a man and a woman, the promotion revealed the real reason for the event was to raise awareness and bring attention to a campaign about violence against women and that the bout wasn't actually going to take place.

== Mixed martial arts career ==
=== Early career ===
Making her debut in 2014, Velasquez won her amateur debut via second-round submission, later that year, kicking off her professional career with a decision victory in a Rio de Janeiro regional promotion. She won her next 4 fights, collecting a 5–0 record, in the process also winning the 1RC Vacant Bantamweight Championship and defending it once. She was eventually offered a multi fight contract with Bellator MMA.

=== Bellator MMA ===
Juliana made her Bellator debut against Na Liang at Bellator 189 on December 1, 2017. She won the fight via second round armbar.

Juliana faced Rebecca Ruth at Bellator 197 on April 13, 2018. She won the fight via front kick to the body in the third round.

In her third fight for the promotion, Velasquez faced Alejandra Lara at Bellator 212 on December 14, 2018. She won the fight via split decision.

Juliana faced Kristina Williams at Bellator 224 on July 12, 2019. She won the fight via TKO in the second round.

Juliana faced Bruna Ellen at Bellator 236 on December 21, 2019. She won the fight via unanimous decision.

==== Bellator Women's Flyweight World Champion ====
Juliana faced undefeated flyweight champ, Ilima-Lei Macfarlane, on December 10, 2020 at Bellator 254. She won the fight and the Bellator Women's Flyweight World Championship via unanimous decision.

Juliana made her first title defense against Denise Kielholtz on July 16, 2021 at Bellator 262. She won the bout by split decision.

Velasquez attempted to defend her title against Liz Carmouche on April 22, 2022 at Bellator 278. She lost the bout and the title via elbows from crucifix at the end of the fourth round. Following the bout, Velasquez's team appealed the result on the grounds of refereeing error made by Mike Beltran, but the appeal was denied by the Hawaii State Boxing Commission.

In a title rematch, Velasquez faced Liz Carmouche again on December 9, 2022 at Bellator 289. She lost the fight via an armbar submission in the second round.

Velasquez was scheduled to face Paula Cristina on November 17, 2023 at Bellator 301. The week of the event, the bout was scrapped for unknown reasons.

=== Professional Fighters League ===
Velasquez debuted with the Professional Fighters League (PFL) at PFL 1 on April 4, 2024 and lost the bout by unanimous decision to Liz Carmouche in a third consecutive loss against her.

Velasquez faced Lisa Mauldin at PFL 4 on June 13, 2024. She won the fight via TKO in the second round.

On February 18, 2025, the promotion officially revealed that Velasquez joined the 2025 PFL Women's Flyweight Tournament.

In the quarterfinal, Velasquez was scheduled to face Taila Santos on April 11, 2025, at PFL 2. However, Santos withdrew from the tournament and was replaced by Ekaterina Shakalova. She lost the fight via rear-naked choke in round one.

Velasquez faced Skakalova in a rematch at PFL 9 on August 15, 2025. She won the fight by unanimous decision.

== Championships and accomplishments ==
=== Mixed martial arts ===
- Bellator MMA
  - Bellator Women's Flyweight World Championship (One time)
    - One successful title defense
- 1º Round Combat
  - 1RC Bantamweight Championship (One time)
    - One successful title defense

== Mixed martial arts record ==
Professional record breakdown
18 matches	14 wins	4 losses
By knockout	5	1
By submission	2	2
By decision	7	1

Res.	Record	Opponent	Method	Event	Date	Round	Time	Location	Notes
Win	14–4	Ekaterina Shakalova	Decision (unanimous)	PFL 9 (2025)	August 15, 2025	3	5:00	Charlotte, North Carolina, United States	
Loss	13–4	Ekaterina Shakalova	Submission (rear-naked choke)	PFL 2 (2025)	April 11, 2025	1	2:05	Orlando, Florida, United States	2025 PFL Women's Flyweight Tournament Quarterfinal.
Win	13–3	Lisa Mauldin	TKO (punches)	PFL 4 (2024)	June 13, 2024	2	1:30	Uncasville, Connecticut, United States	
Loss	12–3	Liz Carmouche	Decision (unanimous)	PFL 1 (2024)	April 4, 2024	3	5:00	San Antonio, Texas, United States	
Loss	12–2	Liz Carmouche	Submission (armbar)	Bellator 289	December 9, 2022	2	4:24	Uncasville, Connecticut, United States	For the Bellator Women's Flyweight World Championship.
Loss	12–1	Liz Carmouche	TKO (elbows)	Bellator 278	April 22, 2022	4	4:47	Honolulu, Hawaii, United States	Lost the Bellator Women's Flyweight World Championship.
Win	12–0	Denise Kielholtz	Decision (split)	Bellator 262	July 16, 2021	5	5:00	Uncasville, Connecticut, United States	Defended the Bellator Women's Flyweight World Championship.
Win	11–0	Ilima-Lei Macfarlane	Decision (unanimous)	Bellator 254	December 10, 2020	5	5:00	Uncasville, Connecticut, United States	Won the Bellator Women's Flyweight World Championship.
Win	10–0	Bruna Ellen	Decision (unanimous)	Bellator 236	December 21, 2019	3	5:00	Honolulu, Hawaii, United States	
Win	9–0	Kristina Williams	TKO (punches)	Bellator 224	July 12, 2019	2	4:03	Thackerville, Oklahoma, United States	
Win	8–0	Alejandra Lara	Decision (split)	Bellator 212	December 14, 2018	3	5:00	Honolulu, Hawaii, United States	
Win	7–0	Rebecca Ruth	KO (body kick)	Bellator 197	April 13, 2018	3	0:19	St. Charles, Missouri, United States	
Win	6–0	Liang Na	Submission (armbar)	Bellator 189	December 1, 2017	2	0:32	Thackerville, Oklahoma, United States	Flyweight debut.
Win	5–0	Taynna Taygma	Decision (unanimous)	IKombat 1	November 12, 2016	3	5:00	Guarulhos, Brazil	
Win	4–0	Elaine Albuquerque	KO (punches)	1° Round Combat 2	May 6, 2016	1	3:55	Natal, Brazil	Defended 1RC Bantamweight Championship.
Win	3–0	Rosy Duarte	TKO (doctor stoppage)	1° Round Combat 1	December 6, 2015	5	4:07	Fortaleza, Brazil	Won the inaugural 1RC Bantamweight Championship.
Win	2–0	Talita Bernardo	Decision (unanimous)	Face to Face 11	April 24, 2015	3	5:00	Rio de Janeiro, Brazil	
Win	1–0	Priscila de Souza	Decision (unanimous)	Circuito Team Nogueira MMA Fight Live 4	December 4, 2014	3	5:00	Rio de Janeiro, Brazil	Bantamweight debut.

Amateur record breakdown		
1 match	1 win	0 losses
By knockout	0	0
By submission	1	0
By decision	0	0

Res.	Record	Opponent	Method	Event	Date	Round	Time	Location	Notes
Win	1–0	Lucelia Souza	Submission (rear-naked choke)	Talent Draft 1: São Paulo	March 7, 2014	2	1:57	São Paulo, Brazil	

== See also ==
- List of current Bellator fighters
- List of current mixed martial arts champions
- List of Bellator MMA champions
- List of female mixed martial artists
