= Bellator 258 =

Bellator mixed martial arts event in 2021

Bellator 258: Archuleta vs. Pettis
- The poster for Bellator 258: Archuleta vs. Pettis
- Promotion: Bellator MMA
- Date: May 7, 2021
- Venue: Mohegan Sun Arena
- City: Uncasville, Connecticut, United States

Event chronology
Bellator 257: Nemkov vs. Davis 2	Bellator 258: Archuleta vs. Pettis	Bellator 259: Cyborg vs. Smith 2

Bellator 258: Archuleta vs. Pettis was a mixed martial arts event produced by Bellator MMA that took place on May 7, 2021 at Mohegan Sun Arena in Uncasville, Connecticut. This fight card is notable for being Anthony Johnson's final fight before his death.

== Background ==
The event was headlined by current Bellator Bantamweight World Champion Juan Archuleta making his first title defense against Sergio Pettis.

The co-main was to feature a Bellator Light Heavyweight World Grand Prix Tournament quarterfinal bout between former UFC Middleweight Title contender Yoel Romero facing off against former UFC Light-Heavyweight Title contender Anthony Johnson in their debuts for the promotion after the bout was moved from Bellator 257 to this event. On April 29, it was announced that Romero had failed his medicals due to an eye issue and the bout was pulled from the card. Romero was also pulled from the Grand Prix. The next day, it was announced that José Augusto Azevedo would replace Romero in the bout and the Grand Prix.

Former Bellator Bantamweight title challenger Patchy Mix was expected to face James Gallagher. However, Gallagher pulled out on April 16 due to undisclosed reasons. UFC alum Albert Morales was announced as a replacement.

A lightweight bout between Patricky Freire and Peter Queally also took place at the event.

A welterweight fight between Logan Storley and Killys Mota was to serve as the main card opener. However, Mota withdrew from the bout due to lingering issues after contracting COVID-19. Mota was replaced by Omar Hussein. Michael Page and Derek Anderson were announced as the replacement opening bout. A welterweight bout between Logan Storley and the debuting Omar Hussein was canceled on fight day before the event began, as Hussein was not medically cleared to compete.

Erik Pérez was scheduled to face Brian Moore at this event. However, Moore tested positive for COVID and pulled out of the bout. He was replaced by Blaine Shutt.

A women's flyweight bout between Valerie Loureda and Hannah Guy was set for this event, but was moved to Bellator 259.

A middleweight bout between Lorenz Larkin and Costello van Steenis was planned for this event. On April 27, it was announced that van Steenis suffered an injury during training and pulled out of the bout. On six days notice, former Bellator Middleweight Champion Rafael Carvalho was announced as the replacement.

A lightweight bout between Bryce Logan and Alan Omer was planned for this event. However, on April 29, Logan pulled out due to injury and the bout was scrapped altogether.

At weigh-ins, Johnny Soto came in at 148.5 pounds, 2.5 pounds over the featherweight limit. The fight proceeded as a catchweight matchup, with a percentage of Soto's purse going to Almeida.

== Results ==
Main Card (Showtime)
Weight class				Method	Round	Time	Notes
Bantamweight	Sergio Pettis	def.	Juan Archuleta (c)	Decision (unanimous) (50–45, 49–46, 49–46)	5	5:00	(Note: For the Bellator Bantamweight World Championship)
Light Heavyweight	Anthony Johnson	def.	José Augusto Azevedo	KO (punch)	2	1:30	(Note: Bellator Light Heavyweight World Grand Prix Tournament Quarter-Final bout.)
Lightweight	Peter Queally	def.	Patricky Freire	TKO (doctor stoppage)	2	5:00
Catchweight (175 lb)	Michael Page	def	Derek Anderson	TKO (doctor stoppage)	1	5:00
Preliminary card (Youtube/Pluto TV)
Bantamweight	Raufeon Stots	def.	Josh Hill	Decision (unanimous) (30–27, 30–27, 30–27)	3	5:00
Middleweight	Lorenz Larkin	def.	Rafael Carvalho	Decision (split) (29–28, 28–29, 29–28)	3	5:00
Bantamweight	Patchy Mix	def.	Albert Morales	Submission (arm-triangle choke)	3	2:40
Middleweight	Johnny Eblen	def.	Daniel Madrid	KO (punches)	1	2:44
Bantamweight	Johnny Campbell	def.	Henry Corrales	Submission (rear-naked choke)	2	4:12
Catchweight (148.5 lb)	Johnny Soto	def.	Weber Almeida	Decision (unanimous) (29–27, 29–28, 29–28)	3	5:00	(Note: Soto missed weight and was fined 20% of his purse.)
Bantamweight	Erik Pérez	def.	Blaine Shutt	Decision (unanimous) (30–26, 30–27, 30–27)	3	5:00

== See also ==
- 2021 in Bellator MMA
- List of Bellator MMA events
- List of current Bellator fighters
