= Juan Archuleta =

American mixed martial arts (MMA) fighter

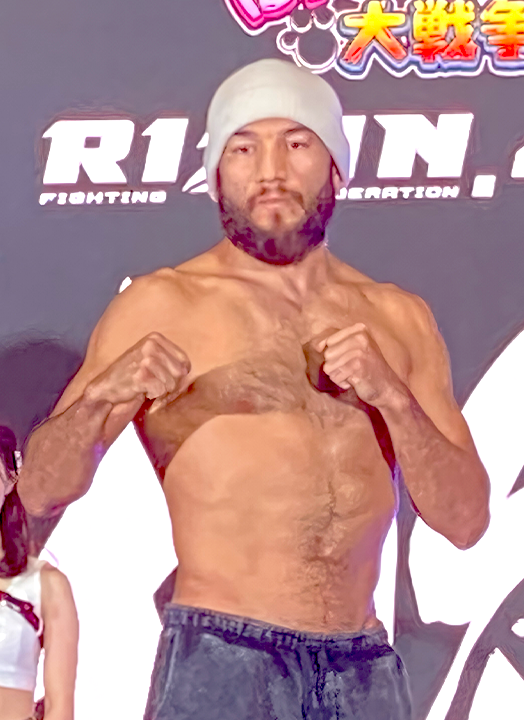
- Archuleta in December 2023
- Born: Juan Archuleta; September 13, 1987 (age 39); Hesperia, California, U.S.
- Other names: The Spaniard
- Height: 5 ft 8 in (1.73 m)
- Weight: 146 lb (66 kg; 10.4 st)
- Division: Bantamweight; Featherweight; Lightweight; Light Welterweight
- Reach: 69 in (175 cm)
- Style: Boxing, Wrestling
- Fighting out of: Hesperia, California, United States
- Team: The Treigning Lab; Cobra Kai Victorville
- Rank: Purple belt in Brazilian Jiu-Jitsu under Philipe Furão
- Wrestling: NCAA Division I Wrestling

Mixed martial arts record
- Total: 38
- Wins: 31
- By knockout: 12
- By submission: 2
- By decision: 17
- Losses: 7
- By knockout: 2
- By submission: 3
- By decision: 2

Other information
- University: Purdue University
- Spouse: Jannai
- Notable school: Sultana High School
- Mixed martial arts record from Sherdog

Juan Archuleta (born September 13, 1987) is an American mixed martial artist, most known for competing in the bantamweight divisions of Bellator MMA and Rizin Fighting Federation, where is a former Bellator Bantamweight World Champion and former Rizin Bantamweight Champion. A professional MMA competitor since 2013, he has also previously fought for King of the Cage and the World Series of Fighting.

== Background ==
Archuleta was born in Hesperia, California, and is of Spanish and Mexican descent. Archuleta's background is in folkstyle wrestling. In high school, he was a state championship qualifier at Sultana High School. He moved on to Sacramento City College where he became a junior college All-American, and finally he transferred to Purdue University where he wrestled at the NCAA Division I level. In January 2021, he was promoted to purple belt in Brazilian Jiu Jitsu by his teacher Philipe Furão.

== Mixed martial arts career ==
=== King of the Cage ===
After going 12–1 on the regional circuit, Archuleta then began fighting for the King of the Cage promotion. In his first fight with the promotion, Archuleta claimed the KOTC featherweight title when he finished former UFC fighter Chris Tickle in the second round via technical knockout. Archuleta also went on to become KOTC bantamweight, lightweight, and light welterweight champion.

=== Bellator MMA ===
After a successful run in King of the Cage, Archuleta signed with Bellator MMA. He made his promotional debut at Bellator 195 against William Joplin. He won the bout via unanimous decision.

His next bout came against Robbie Peralta at Bellator 201 on June 29, 2018. He won the bout via knockout in the third round.

Archuleta next faced Jeremy Spoon at Bellator 210 on November 30, 2018. He won via unanimous decision.

Archuleta's next bout took place on January 26, 2019, against Ricky Bandejas at Bellator 214. He won via unanimous decision.

In his next bout, Archuleta faced former Bellator Bantamweight World Champion Eduardo Dantas at Bellator 222 on June 14, 2019. Archuleta was victorious via knockout at 4:59 of round 2.

For his next fight, Archuleta entered the Bellator Featherweight World Grand Prix and in the opening round, he received a Featherweight title shot against champion Patrício Freire at Bellator 228 on September 28, 2019. He lost via unanimous decision.

Archuleta then faced Henry Corrales at Bellator 238 on January 25, 2020. He was victorious via unanimous decision.

==== Bellator MMA Bantamweight World Champion ====
Archuleta returned to the bantamweight division to face Patchy Mix for the vacant Bellator Bantamweight World Championship on September 12, 2020, at Bellator 246. He won the bout via unanimous decision to become Bellator Bantamweight world champion.

Archuleta made his first title defense against Sergio Pettis at Bellator 258 on May 7, 2021. He lost the bout and the title via unanimous decision.

==== Bellator Bantamweight World Grand Prix ====
Archuleta, replacing the injured Sergio Pettis, faced Raufeon Stots for the Interim Bellator Bantamweight World Championship on April 23, 2022, at Bellator 279. Archuleta lost the bout after getting knocked out by a head kick and then finished on the ground with elbows at the beginning of the third round.

==== Post Grand Prix; Rizin FF ====
Archuleta faced Enrique Barzola on October 1, 2022, at Bellator 286. At weigh ins, the bout was moved to a catchweight of 141 pounds. In a fast paced bout, Archuleta won the bout via unanimous decision.

Archuleta faced former Road FC and ONE Championship Bantamweight Champion Soo Chul Kim at Bellator MMA vs. Rizin on December 31, 2022. In a close back and forth bout, Archuleta came out of it with a split decision victory.

Archuleta was booked to face Naoki Inoue at Rizin 42 on May 6, 2023. He won the fight by unanimous decision.

==== Rizin Bantamweight World Champion ====
Archuleta was next expected to face former Rizin Bantamweight Champion Kai Asakura for the vacant Rizin Bantamweight Championship as part of the Bellator MMA x Rizin 2 card on July 30, 2023. However on July 18 it was announced that Asakura withdrew due to injury and was replaced by Hiromasa Ougikubo. Archuleta won the bout via unanimous decision.

For his first title defense, Archuleta faced Kai Asakura on December 31, 2023, at Rizin 45. At the weigh-ins, Archuleta weighed in at 140.65 pounds, 5.65 pounds over the limit. As a result, Archuleta was stripped of the title and only Asakura was eligible to win it. Archuleta lost the bout via TKO in the second round.

In his next bout, Archuleta faced former Rizin Featherweight Champion Kleber Koike Erbst in a featherweight bout at Rizin 47 on June 9, 2024. He lost the bout via an inverted heel hook submission in the first round.

Archuleta faced Razhabali Shaydullaev at Rizin 48 on September 29, 2024, and lost the bout via armbar submission in the first round.

== Personal life ==
After being deemed academically ineligible to continue wrestling at Purdue University, Archuleta struggled with alcohol addiction and became involved in criminal activity. He eventually served a prison stint prior to becoming a mixed martial artist.

== Championships and awards ==
- Bellator MMA
  - Bellator Bantamweight World Championship (One time)
- Rizin Fighting Federation
  - RIZIN Bantamweight Championship (One time)
- King of the Cage
  - KOTC Lightweight Championship (One time)
  - KOTC Featherweight Championship (One time)
    - Three successful title defenses
  - KOTC Bantamweight Championship (One time)
  - KOTC Light Welterweight Championship (One time)
- California Fight League
  - CFL Featherweight Championship (One time)
- Tru-Form Entertainment
  - TFE Featherweight Championship (One time)
- Gladiator Challenge
  - GC Bantamweight Championship (One time)

== Mixed martial arts record ==
Professional record breakdown
38 matches	31 wins	7 losses
By knockout	12	2
By submission	2	3
By decision	17	2

Res.	Record	Opponent	Method	Event	Date	Round	Time	Location	Notes
Win	31–7	Jose Johnson	Submission (rear-naked choke)	Borroka Presents: XFC 53	September 20, 2025	2	2:31	Las Vegas, Nevada, United States	Defended the Borroka Featherweight Championship.
Win	30–7	Dennis Linton	KO (flying knee)	Borroka Promotion 3	June 21, 2025	2	0:32	Laughlin, Nevada, United States	Won the inaugural Borroka Featherweight Championship.
Loss	29–7	Razhabali Shaydullaev	Submission (armbar)	Rizin 48	September 29, 2024	1	3:12	Saitama, Japan	
Loss	29–6	Kleber Koike Erbst	Submission (inverted heel hook)	Rizin 47	June 9, 2024	1	2:25	Tokyo, Japan	Return to Featherweight.
Loss	29–5	Kai Asakura	TKO (knee to the body and punches)	Rizin 45	December 31, 2023	2	3:20	Saitama, Japan	Archuleta missed weight (140.65 lb) and was stripped of the Rizin Bantamweight Championship. Only Asakura was eligible to win the title.
Win	29–4	Hiromasa Ougikubo	Decision (unanimous)	Super Rizin 2	July 30, 2023	3	5:00	Saitama, Japan	Won the vacant Rizin Bantamweight Championship.
Win	28–4	Naoki Inoue	Decision (unanimous)	Rizin 42	May 6, 2023	3	5:00	Tokyo, Japan	
Win	27–4	Soo Chul Kim	Decision (split)	Bellator MMA vs. Rizin	December 31, 2022	3	5:00	Saitama, Japan	
Win	26–4	Enrique Barzola	Decision (unanimous)	Bellator 286	October 1, 2022	3	5:00	Long Beach, California, United States	Catchweight (141 lb) bout.
Loss	25–4	Raufeon Stots	KO (head kick and elbows)	Bellator 279	April 23, 2022	3	0:16	Honolulu, Hawaii, United States	Bellator Bantamweight World Grand Prix Quarterfinal. For the interim Bellator Bantamweight World Championship.
Loss	25–3	Sergio Pettis	Decision (unanimous)	Bellator 258	May 7, 2021	5	5:00	Uncasville, Connecticut, United States	Lost the Bellator Bantamweight World Championship.
Win	25–2	Patchy Mix	Decision (unanimous)	Bellator 246	September 12, 2020	5	5:00	Uncasville, Connecticut, United States	Return to Bantamweight. Won the vacant Bellator Bantamweight World Championship.
Win	24–2	Henry Corrales	Decision (unanimous)	Bellator 238	January 25, 2020	3	5:00	Inglewood, California, United States	
Loss	23–2	Patrício Freire	Decision (unanimous)	Bellator 228	September 28, 2019	5	5:00	Inglewood, California, United States	Bellator Featherweight World Grand Prix Opening Round. For the Bellator Featherweight World Championship.
Win	23–1	Eduardo Dantas	KO (punch)	Bellator 222	June 14, 2019	2	4:59	New York City, New York, United States	
Win	22–1	Ricky Bandejas	Decision (unanimous)	Bellator 214	January 26, 2019	3	5:00	Inglewood, California, United States	Bantamweight bout.
Win	21–1	Jeremy Spoon	Decision (unanimous)	Bellator 210	November 30, 2018	3	5:00	Thackerville, Oklahoma, United States	
Win	20–1	Robbie Peralta	KO (punches)	Bellator 201	June 29, 2018	3	0:14	Temecula, California, United States	
Win	19–1	William Joplin	Decision (unanimous)	Bellator 195	March 2, 2018	3	5:00	Thackerville, Oklahoma, United States	
Win	18–1	Mark Dickman	TKO (retirement)	KOTC: Conquistadores	December 3, 2017	4	5:00	Ontario, California, United States	Defended the KOTC Bantamweight Championship.
Win	17–1	Adel Altamimi	TKO (punches)	KOTC: Never Quit	September 2, 2017	1	4:23	Ontario, California, United States	Won the vacant KOTC Light Welterweight Championship.
Win	16–1	Vytautas Sadauskas	Decision (unanimous)	KOTC: Baltic Tour	April 8, 2017	5	5:00	Kaunas, Lithuania	
Win	15–1	Brandon Hastings	TKO (punches)	KOTC: Supernova	March 18, 2017	1	0:24	Ontario, California, United States	Defended the KOTC Lightweight Championship.
Win	14–1	Derrick Mandell	Decision (unanimous)	KOTC: Warranted Aggression	December 18, 2016	5	5:00	Ontario, California, United States	Won the KOTC Flyweight Championship.
Win	13–1	Jay Bogan	TKO (retirement)	California Fight League 9	October 22, 2016	1	5:00	California, United States	Won the vacant CFL Featherweight Championship.
Win	12–1	Jordan Griffin	Decision (unanimous)	KOTC: Destructive Intent	July 23, 2016	5	5:00	Washington, Pennsylvania, United States	Won the KOTC Bantamweight Championship.
Win	11–1	Chris Tickle	TKO (punches)	KOTC: Firefight	June 4, 2016	2	0:41	San Jacinto, California, United States	Won the vacant KOTC Lightweight Championship.
Win	10–1	Emilio Chavez	Decision (unanimous)	SMASH Global 3	March 24, 2016	3	5:00	Los Angeles, California, United States	
Win	9–1	Luis Guerra	TKO (punches)	Tru-Form Entertainment: No Fear	January 23, 2016	3	2:39	Sullivan, Indiana, United States	Featherweight debut. Won the vacant TFE Featherweight Championship.
Win	8–1	Andrew Natividiad	Decision (unanimous)	California Fight League 5	November 21, 2015	3	5:00	Fort Irwin, California, United States	
Win	7–1	Alfred Khashakyan	Decision (unanimous)	Lights Out / Bash Entertainment Fight Night At Sportsmen's Lodge 4	October 23, 2015	3	5:00	Los Angeles, California, United States	Return to Bantamweight.
Win	6–1	Alex Valdez	Submission (Brabo choke)	Gladiator Challenge: Collision Course	October 10, 2015	3	0:13	Lincoln, California, United States	Lightweight debut.
Loss	5–1	Andres Ponce	Submission (triangle choke)	WSOF 19	March 28, 2015	2	0:53	Phoenix, Arizona, United States	
Win	5–0	Ralph Acosta	Decision (split)	Gladiator Challenge: Season's Beatings	November 22, 2014	3	3:00	Rancho Mirage, California, United States	Won the GC Bantamweight Championship.
Win	4–0	Valentino Beatty	TKO (punches)	Gladiator Challenge: Carnage	October 11, 2014	1	2:30	Lincoln, California, United States	
Win	3–0	Casey Doyle	TKO (punches)	Gladiator Challenge: Payback	August 30, 2014	1	0:46	San Jacinto, California, United States	
Win	2–0	Justin Santistevan	TKO (punches)	Gladiator Challenge: Night of Champions	July 19, 2014	3	1:25	Rancho Mirage, California, United States	
Win	1–0	David Duran	Decision (unanimous)	BAMMA USA: Badbeat 10	August 9, 2013	3	5:00	Commerce, California, United States	Bantamweight debut.

== Freestyle wrestling record ==
Freestyle matches
Res.	Record	Opponent	Score	Date	Event	Location
Loss	0–1	(United States) Dylan Ragusin	TF 0–10	October 23, 2026	RAF 14	(United States) Las Vegas, Nevada

== See also ==
- List of current Bellator fighters
- List of male mixed martial artists
