= Tywan Claxton =

American mixed martial arts fighter

- Born: Tywan Claxton; November 25, 1992 (age 33); Cleveland, Ohio, U.S.
- Other names: Air
- Height: 5 ft 8 in (1.73 m)
- Weight: 145 lb (66 kg; 10.4 st)
- Division: Featherweight
- Reach: 74 in (188 cm)
- Style: Wrestling, Boxing, Muay Thai, Jujitsu
- Fighting out of: Cleveland, Ohio, United States
- Team: Warehouse warriors Blackzilians (formerly); Elevation Fight Team (2020–present)
- Wrestling: NCAA Division I Wrestling
- Years active: 2017–present

Mixed martial arts record
- Total: 11
- Wins: 8
- By knockout: 4
- By decision: 4
- Losses: 3
- By submission: 1
- By decision: 2

Tywan Claxton (born November 25, 1992) is an American mixed martial artist and former amateur wrestler. He most notably competed in Bellator MMA at featherweight.

== Early life ==
Claxton was born in Cleveland, Ohio, where he went to Frank L. Wiley Middle School. Claxton formerly wrestled at King University in Bristol, Tennessee, where he studied medicine. He also wrestled and gained All-American status in NCAA Division II at the 141-pound weight class.

In 2015, Claxton transferred to Ohio University. He wrestled for two years for the Ohio Bobcats and was a two-time NCAA Division I national qualifier; Claxton was set to compete his senior year, however, days before the season was scheduled to start, Claxton was deemed ineligible to wrestle because of a transfer rule set by the NCAA. Claxton graduated with a degree in Healthcare Marketing. Claxton taught himself how to code and spends his spare time on the computer. Claxton compiled a 6–0 amateur MMA record after deciding to train in MMA.

== Mixed martial arts career ==
Claxton began training in mixed martial arts after not being able to compete in wrestling his senior year at Ohio University. Although he dabbled in the sport in college, he ultimately started real training once he received an invitation to move to Florida to train with the Blackzilians from wrestling coach Greg Jones. Claxton trained among the best fighters in the world, with teammates in both Ultimate Fighting Championship and Bellator MMA.

=== Bellator MMA ===
It was announced that Claxton had signed with Bellator MMA in August 2017.

Claxton made his professional MMA debut at Bellator 186 in University Park, Pennsylvania, vs Johnny Bonilla-Bowman. Claxton successfully made his debut with an emphatic flying knee to knock out his opponent in the first round. It was deemed as a knockout of the year contender.

Claxton had his second professional fight at Bellator 194 in Uncasville, Connecticut, vs Jose Perez. Claxton used his wrestling and top game to dominate his opponent and ultimately won the fight by second round tko.

On the 18th of August 2018, Claxton had his third professional bout at Bellator 204 in Sioux Falls, South Dakota, vs Cris Lencioni, who gave up a percentage of his fight purse by missing weight by 2.4 pounds. Claxton used his superior striking and ultimately using his wrestling to win a clear decision over three rounds.

Tywan then had his fourth fight against Kaeo Meyer at Bellator 212, in Bellator's debut in Hawaii, at the Neal S. Blaisdell Center in Honolulu. Claxton would win the fight by TKO in the second round.

Claxton's fifth fight came against James Bennett at Bellator 221 in Chicago on May 11, 2019. He won the bout by TKO in the third round. Claxton infamously began speaking to 50 Cent, seated near the cage, during the fight while engaging with Bennett on the ground.

Claxton next faced Emmanuel Sanchez in the opening round of the Bellator featherweight world grand prix at Bellator 226 on September 7, 2019. He lost the bout via second round submission.

Claxton faced Braydon Akeo at Bellator 235 on December 20, 2019. After largely winning the striking exchanges and taking Akeo down, Claxton won the bout via unanimous decision.

Claxton faced former Legacy Fighting Alliance Featherweight Champion Justin Gonzales at Bellator 260 on June 11, 2021. He lost the fight by split decision.

On July 10, 2021, it was announced that he was no longer under contract with Bellator.

== Mixed martial arts record ==
Professional record breakdown
| 11 matches | 8 wins | 3 losses |
| By knockout | 4 | 0 |
| By submission | 0 | 1 |
| By decision | 4 | 2 |

| Res. | Record | Opponent | Method | Event | Date | Round | Time | Location | Notes |
|---|---|---|---|---|---|---|---|---|---|
| Win | 8–3 | Tynchtykbek Kanybek Uulu | Decision (unanimous) | Tuff-N-Uff 142 | March 14, 2025 | 3 | 5:00 | Las Vegas, Nevada, United States | |
| Win | 7–3 | Sitik Muduev | Decision (unanimous) | Tuff-N-Uff 138 | July 26, 2024 | 3 | 5:00 | Las Vegas, Nevada, United States | |
| Loss | 6–3 | Justin Gonzales | Decision (split) | Bellator 260 | June 11, 2021 | 3 | 5:00 | Uncasville, Connecticut, United States | |
| Loss | 6–2 | Jay Jay Wilson | Decision (split) | Bellator 242 | July 24, 2020 | 3 | 5:00 | Uncasville, Connecticut, United States | Catchweight (147.9 lbs) bout; Wilson missed weight. |
| Win | 6–1 | Braydon Akeo | Decision (unanimous) | Bellator 235 | December 20, 2019 | 3 | 5:00 | Honolulu, Hawaii, United States | |
| Loss | 5–1 | Emmanuel Sanchez | Submission (triangle choke) | Bellator 226 | September 7, 2019 | 2 | 4:11 | San Jose, California, United States | Bellator Featherweight World Grand Prix Opening Round. |
| Win | 5–0 | James Bennett | TKO (punches) | Bellator 221 | May 11, 2019 | 3 | 2:09 | Rosemont, Illinois, United States | |
| Win | 4–0 | Kaeo Meyer | TKO (punches) | Bellator 212 | December 14, 2018 | 1 | 2:56 | Honolulu, Hawaii, United States | Catchweight (150 lb) bout. |
| Win | 3–0 | Cris Lencioni | Decision (unanimous) | Bellator 204 | August 18, 2018 | 3 | 5:00 | Sioux Falls, South Dakota, United States | |
| Win | 2–0 | Jose Perez | TKO (elbows and punches) | Bellator 194 | February 16, 2018 | 2 | 3:39 | Uncasville, Connecticut, United States | |
| Win | 1–0 | Jonny Bonilla-Bowman | KO (flying knee) | Bellator 186 | November 3, 2017 | 1 | 1:29 | University Park, Pennsylvania, United States | Featherweight debut. |
