= Joey Davis =

American wrestler and mixed martial arts (MMA) fighter

- Born: Joey Malcom Davis; December 29, 1993 (age 32); Compton, California, United States
- Other names: Black Ice
- Height: 5 ft 11 in (1.80 m)
- Weight: 170 lb (77 kg; 12 st)
- Division: Welterweight (170 lbs)
- Reach: 75 in (191 cm)
- Style: Wrestling
- Fighting out of: Compton, California, United States
- Team: Team Bodyshop
- Wrestling: NCAA Division II Wrestling
- Years active: 2016–present

Mixed martial arts record
- Total: 9
- Wins: 8
- By knockout: 5
- By decision: 3
- Losses: 1
- By decision: 1

Amateur record
- Total: 5
- Wins: 5
- Losses: 0

Other information
- Mixed martial arts record from Sherdog

Joel Malcolm Davis (born December 29, 1993) is an American professional mixed martial artist and graduated folkstyle wrestler who currently competes in the welterweight division. As a wrestler at Notre Dame College, he was the only four-time undefeated NCAA Division II National Champion in history and one of the three to do so across all NCAA divisions.

== Wrestling career ==
=== High school ===
Born in Compton, California, Davis attended Santa Fe High School, where he was a two-sport athlete, playing football and competing in wrestling. He started wrestling at age five, and he was a CIF state finalist his sophomore year and state champion in his junior and senior seasons as a high schooler. Nationally, he was a two-time FloNationals champion and a Reno champion.

Davis was an NCAA Division I recruit as a football player, however, he chose to wrestle.

=== College ===
After graduating from high school, Davis committed to wrestle at Notre Dame College.

Davis finished his true freshman season with 33 victories and no defeats and an NCAA title at 165 pounds. After moving up to 174 pounds, Davis compiled 35 more wins and closed the season undefeated, claiming titles from the Clarion Knight Point Open, Michigan State Open, Cleveland State Open, University of Indianapolis Greyhound Open, NCAA Division II Super Region I and the NCAA National Championship. As a junior, he compiled a record of 38–0 and won his third NCAA Division II National title. In his fourth and last season, Davis was able to close the show with a National title at 184 pounds and the Outstanding Wrestler Award, finishing his overall career with 133 wins and no losses.

Davis is one of the three undefeated four-time NCAA champions, sharing the podium with Cael Sanderson (159–0) from Division I and Marcus LeVesseur (155–0) from Division III.

=== Freestyle ===
In May 2016, Davis competed at the annual Beat The Streets event, named Salsa in the Square. He faced three-time NCAA Division I Champion and Dan Hodge Trophy winner Alex Dieringer. He lost the match by points, being outscored 9 points to none.

== Mixed martial arts career ==
Davis started competing in mixed martial arts while he was still competing in college, amassing an undefeated record of 5 wins and no losses.

=== Bellator MMA ===
Davis signed with Bellator MMA in June 2016, months after his last wrestling season in college.

Davis made his professional debut at an 175-pound catchweight bout against Keith Cutrone on August 26, 2016, at Bellator 160. He won the fight by unanimous decision.

Davis faced Justin Roswell on August 25, 2017, at Bellator 182 (a year later his previous bout). He won the fight by technical-knockout in the first round.

Davis faced Ian Butler on January 20, 2018, at Bellator 192. He won the fight by knockout 39 seconds into the first round.

Davis faced Craig Plaskett on June 29, 2018, at Bellator 201. He won the fight by unanimous decision.

Davis was scheduled to face Jesse Merritton on March 29, 2019, at Bellator 219. However, Merritton withdrew from the event and was replaced by Marcus Anthony. Davis won the fight by knockout in the first round.

Davis faced Jeff Peterson on October 9, 2019, at Bellator 229. He won the fight by knockout in a minute into the first round.

Davis faced Chris Cisneros on December 20, 2019, at Bellator 235. He won the fight by technical-knockout in the first round.

Davis faced promotional newcomer Bobby Lee on November 19, at Bellator 253. He won the fight by unanimous decision.

After a 2.5 year layoff, Davis made his return against Jeff Creighton on March 31, 2023, at Bellator 293. Despite being a 14-to-1 favorite, Davis lost the bout via split decision.

== Awards and accomplishments ==
May 17, 2025 Joey Davis was inducted into the California Wrestling Hall of Fame.

=== Folkstyle wrestling ===
- National Collegiate Athletic Association
  - NCAA Division II 165 lb National Champion out of Notre Dame College (2013)
  - NCAA Division II 174 lb National Champion out of Notre Dame College (2014)
  - NCAA Division II 174 lb National Champion out of Notre Dame College (2015)
  - NCAA Division II 184 lb National Champion out of Notre Dame College (2016)

== Mixed martial arts record ==
Professional record breakdown
9 matches	8 wins	1 loss
By knockout	5	0
By decision	3	1

Res.	Record	Opponent	Method	Event	Date	Round	Time	Location	Notes
Loss	8–1	Jeff Creighton	Decision (split)	Bellator 293	March 31, 2023	3	5:00	Temecula, California, United States	
Win	8–0	Bobby Lee	Decision (unanimous)	Bellator 253	November 19, 2020	3	5:00	Uncasville, Connecticut, United States	
Win	7–0	Chris Cisneros	TKO (punches)	Bellator 235	December 20, 2019	1	3:55	Honolulu, Hawaii, United States	
Win	6–0	Jeffrey Peterson	KO (flying knee)	Bellator 229	October 9, 2019	1	1:00	Temecula, California, United States	
Win	5–0	Marcus Anthony	KO (punch)	Bellator 219	March 29, 2019	1	4:21	Temecula, California, United States	
Win	4–0	Craig Plaskett	Decision (unanimous)	Bellator 201	June 29, 2018	3	5:00	Temecula, California, United States	
Win	3–0	Ian Butler	KO (spinning back kick)	Bellator 192	January 20, 2018	1	0:39	Inglewood, California, United States	Welterweight debut.
Win	2–0	Justin Roswell	TKO (elbows)	Bellator 182	August 25, 2017	1	1:35	Verona, New York, United States	Catchweight (175 lb) bout.
Win	1–0	Keith Cutrone	Decision (unanimous)	Bellator 160	August 26, 2016	3	5:00	Anaheim, California, United States	Catchweight (175 lb) bout.

== NCAA record ==
NCAA Division II Championships Matches
Res.	Record	Opponent	Score	Date	Event
2016 NCAA (DII) Championships (gold) at 184 lbs
Win	16–0	Travis Mckillop	3–1	March 11–12, 2016	2016 NCAA Division II Wrestling Championships
Win	15–0	Jacob Waste	3–2	March 11–12, 2016	2016 NCAA Division II Wrestling Championships
Win	14–0	Nick Burghardt	8–2	March 11–12, 2016	2016 NCAA Division II Wrestling Championships
Win	13–0	Brandon Supernaw	MD 13–5	March 11–12, 2016	2016 NCAA Division II Wrestling Championships
2015 NCAA (DII) Championships (gold) at 174 lbs
Win	12–0	Zeb Wahle	4–2	March 13–14, 2015	2015 NCAA Division II Wrestling Championships
Win	11–0	John Blankenship	7–4	March 13–14, 2015	2015 NCAA Division II Wrestling Championships
Win	10–0	Terrence Zaleski	4–2	March 13–14, 2015	2015 NCAA Division II Wrestling Championships
Win	9–0	Caleb Copeland	MD 14–5	March 13–14, 2015	2015 NCAA Division II Wrestling Championships
2014 NCAA (DII) Championships (gold) at 174 lbs
Win	8–0	Adam Walters	4–1	March 14–15, 2014	2014 NCAA Division II Wrestling Championships
Win	7–0	Patrick Martinez	5–2	March 14–15, 2014	2014 NCAA Division II Wrestling Championships
Win	6–0	Trevor Grant	Fall	March 14–15, 2014	2014 NCAA Division II Wrestling Championships
Win	5–0	Conner Monk	Fall	March 14–15, 2014	2014 NCAA Division II Wrestling Championships
2013 NCAA (DII) Championships (gold) at 165 lbs
Win	4–0	Chase Nelson	7–5	March 8–9, 2013	2013 NCAA Division II Wrestling Championships
Win	3–0	Isaiah Jimenez	MD 11–2	March 8–9, 2013	2013 NCAA Division II Wrestling Championships
Win	2–0	Justin Samora	MD 18–4	March 8–9, 2013	2013 NCAA Division II Wrestling Championships
Win	1–0	Wade Gobin	11–7	March 8–9, 2013	2013 NCAA Division II Wrestling Championships
