= 2019 in Bellator MMA =

Mixed martial arts events

Information
- Promotion: Bellator MMA
- First date aired: January 26, 2019
- Last date aired: December 29, 2019

2019 in Bellator MMA was the eleventh year in the history of Bellator MMA, a mixed martial arts promotion based in the United States. Bellator held 27 events in 2019.

== Bellator Featherweight World Grand Prix Tournament ==
Opening round
(United States) A. J. McKee	KO
(Armenia) Georgi Karakhanyan	1
(United States) Derek Campos	UD
(United States) Daniel Straus	3
(United States) Darrion Caldwell	UD
(United States) Henry Corrales	3
(Hungary) Ádám Borics	TKO
(United States) Pat Curran	2
(Brazil) Patrício Pitbull (c)	UD
(United States) Juan Archuleta	5
(Portugal) Pedro Carvalho	SUB
(United States) Sam Sicilia	2
(United States) Emmanuel Sanchez	SUB
(United States) Tywan Claxton	2
(Germany) Daniel Weichel	UD
(United Kingdom) Saul Rogers	3

Quarterfinals
(United States) A. J. McKee	SUB
(United States) Derek Campos	3
(United States) Darrion Caldwell	SUB
(Hungary) Ádám Borics	1
(Brazil) Patrício Pitbull (c)	KO
(Portugal) Pedro Carvalho	1
(United States) Emmanuel Sanchez	UD
(Germany) Daniel Weichel	5

Semi-finals
(United States) A. J. McKee	SUB
(United States) Darrion Caldwell	1
(Brazil) Patrício Pitbull (c)	SUB
(United States) Emmanuel Sanchez	1

Final
(United States) A. J. McKee	SUB
(Brazil) Patrício Pitbull (c)	1

== Bellator Welterweight World Grand Prix Tournament ==
In 2018, Bellator organised the 2018–2019 Welterweight Grand Prix that will crown the Bellator Welterweight champion. All fights will be five rounds. If Rory MacDonald were to lose, the victor will be declared lineal champion until he loses or wins the tournament and becomes undisputed champion.

Quarter-finals
(Brazil) Douglas Lima	SUB
(Russia) Andrey Koreshkov	5
(United Kingdom) Michael Page	UD
(United Kingdom) Paul Daley	5
(Canada) Rory MacDonald (c)	DRAW
(United States) Jon Fitch	5
(Brazil) Neiman Gracie	SUB
(United States) Ed Ruth	4

Semi-finals
(Brazil) Douglas Lima	KO
(United Kingdom) Michael Page	2
(Canada) Rory MacDonald (c)	UD
(Brazil) Neiman Gracie	5

Final
(Brazil) Douglas Lima	UD
(Canada) Rory MacDonald (c)	5

- Lorenz Larkin versus Ion Pascu took place to determine a tournament alternate, with Larkin winning to stand as the alternate.
- Champion Rory MacDonald retained his title in a majority draw. He advanced to fight Neiman Gracie.

== Bellator 214 ==
Bellator 214: Fedor vs. Bader
- Date: January 26, 2019
- Venue: The Forum
- City: Inglewood, California
- Attendance: 12,914
- Total gate: $1,277,196

Bellator 214: Fedor vs. Bader took place on January 26, 2019 at The Forum in Inglewood, California. The event aired live on Paramount Network and DAZN.

Background

This event concluded the Bellator Heavyweight World Grand Prix by awarding the winner of the main event with the Bellator Heavyweight World Championship. This belt was vacated in May 2016 by Vitaly Minakov, who had not defended the title since April 2014. Fedor Emelianenko and current Bellator Light Heavyweight World Champion Ryan Bader both advanced to the finals.

A featherweight bout between elite prospects Aaron Pico and Henry Corrales was announced for the event on November 7, 2018.

On November 19, 2018, it was announced that Bellator Middleweight World Champion Gegard Mousasi would be defending the title against Rafael Lovato Jr. in the co main event. However, Mousasi pulled out on December 19 due to back injury and Lovato was eventually pulled from the card.

On December 3, 2018, it was announced that Bellator 214 would feature the MMA debut of former WWE World Heavyweight Champion and NCAA Division I All-American Jake Hager.

Results

Fight card (Paramount Network and DAZN)
Weight class				Method	Round	Time	Notes
Heavyweight	Ryan Bader	def.	Fedor Emelianenko	TKO (punches)	1	0:35	(Note: Bellator Heavyweight World Grand Prix Final. For the vacant Bellator Heavyweight World Championship.)
Featherweight	Henry Corrales	def.	Aaron Pico	KO (punches)	1	1:07
Heavyweight	Jake Hager	def.	J.W. Kiser	Submission (arm-triangle choke)	1	2:09
Bantamweight	Juan Archuleta	def.	Ricky Bandejas	Decision (unanimous) (29–28, 29–28, 29–28)	3	5:00
Featherweight	Adel Altamimi	def.	Brandon McMahan	Submission (armbar)	1	1:16
Preliminary card (Bellator.com and Bellator Mobile App)
Welterweight	Thor Skancke	def.	Jesse Merritt	Submission (north-south choke)	1	4:26
Catchweight (160 lb)	Jesse Roberts	def.	AJ Agazarm	Decision (split) (29–28, 28–29, 29–28)	3	5:00
Catchweight (137 lb)	Weber Almeida	def.	Odan Chinchilla	KO (punch)	1	3:04
Heavyweight	Art Rivas	def.	Sean Johnson	TKO (knees and punches)	1	4:30
Featherweight	Jay Jay Wilson	def.	Tyler Beneke	Submission (rear-naked choke)	1	1:31
Bantamweight	Ryan Lilley	def.	James Barnes	KO (head kick)	1	1:03
Welterweight	Craig Plaskett	def.	Ian Butler	Decision (unanimous) (30–27, 30–27, 30–27)	3	5:00
Bantamweight	Desmond Torres	def.	Steve Ramirez	Submission (arm-triangle choke)	1	4:21
Postliminary card (Dark Bouts)
Catchweight (190 lb)	Osman Diaz	def.	Christopher Reyes	TKO (punches)	1	4:15
Lightweight	David Pacheco	def.	Jorge Juarez	TKO (punches)	2	3:36

== Bellator Newcastle ==
Bellator Newcastle: Pitbull vs. Scope
- Date: February 9, 2019
- Venue: Utilita Arena Newcastle
- City: Newcastle upon Tyne, England
- Attendance: 9,684
- Total gate: £741,296 (GBP) / $986,316 (USD)

Bellator Newcastle: Pitbull vs. Scope took place on February 9, 2019 at Utilita Arena in Newcastle upon Tyne, England.

Background

The event marked the start of Bellator's new European series.

The event was headlined by a lightweight title bout between Patricky Freire and Ryan Scope.

Results

Fight card
Weight class				Method	Round	Time	Notes
Lightweight	Patricky Freire	def.	Ryan Scope	Decision (split) (29–28, 28–29, 29–28)	3	5:00
Lightweight	Corey Browning	def.	Aaron Chalmers	Submission (heel hook)	3	0:20
Lightweight	Chris Bungard	def.	Terry Brazier	Submission (rear-naked choke)	1	2:06
Middleweight	Fabian Edwards	def.	Lee Chadwick	Decision (unanimous) (30–26, 30–27, 30–27)	3	5:00
Preliminary card (Bellator.com and Bellator Mobile App)
Light Heavyweight	Arunas Andriuskevicus	def.	James Mulheron	TKO (doctor stoppage)	3	0:42
Welterweight	Jim Wallhead	def.	Abner Lloveras	Decision (unanimous) (29–28, 30–27, 30–27)	3	5:00
Bantamweight	Cal Ellenor	def.	Nathan Greyson	Submission (rear-naked choke)	1	3:49
Featherweight	Nathan Rose	def.	Ranjett Baria	KO (punch)	1	4:59
Welterweight	Justin Burlinson	def.	Maciej Gierszewski	Submission (rear-naked choke)	1	4:04
Bantamweight	Luke Westwood	def.	Richard Kallos	TKO (punches)	3	1:32
Welterweight	Ashley Reece	def.	John Ross	TKO (punches)	1	3:42
Middleweight	Tommy Quinn	def.	Martin Hudson	KO (punches)	1	3:02
Lightweight	Kieran Lister	def.	Davie McLaughlin	KO (punch)	1	1:19
Lightweight	Joseph Calboutin	def.	Milad Ahady	TKO (punches)	1	3:30
Heavyweight	Mindaugas Gerve	def.	Tony Mustard	TKO (injury)	1	1:46

== Bellator 215 ==
Bellator 215: Mitrione vs. Kharitonov
- Date: February 15, 2019
- Venue: Mohegan Sun Arena
- City: Uncasville, Connecticut
- Attendance: 9,117
- Total gate: $902,401

Bellator 215: Mitrione vs. Kharitonov took place on February 15, 2019 at Mohegan Sun Arena in Uncasville, Connecticut The event aired on Paramount Network and DAZN.

Background

The event featured a heavyweight bout between Matt Mitrione and Sergei Kharitonov in the main event.

Results

Fight card
Weight class				Method	Round	Time	Notes
Heavyweight	Matt Mitrione	vs.	Sergei Kharitonov	NC (accidental groin kick)	1	0:15
Welterweight	Logan Storley	def.	Ion Pascu	Decision (unanimous) (30–27, 30–26, 30–26)	3	5:00
Bantamweight	Eduardo Dantas	def.	Toby Misech	Decision (unanimous) (29–28, 30–27, 30–27)	3	5:00
Bantamweight	John Douma	def.	Mike Kimbel	Submission (triangle choke)	1	2:51
Catchweight (175 lb)	Austin Vanderford	def.	Cody Jones	Submission (arm-triangle choke)	1	4:49
Preliminary card (Bellator.com and Bellator Mobile App)
Welterweight	Billy Goff	def.	Ryan Hardy	Decision (unanimous) (29–28, 29–28, 29–28)	3	5:00
Flyweight	Zarrukh Adashev	def.	Ron Arana	Decision (unanimous) (29–28, 30–27, 30–27)	3	5:00
Featherweight	Matt Probin	def.	Ali Zebian	Decision (split) (29–28, 28–29, 29–28)	3	5:00
Featherweight	Pete Rogers Jr.	def.	Jason Rine	TKO (punches)	2	0:50
Heavyweight	Steve Mowry	def.	Darion Abbey	Submission (kimura)	1	1:27
Women's Featherweight	Amanda Bell	def.	Amber Leibrock	TKO (punches)	1	3:52
Women's Atomweight	Lindsey VanZandt	def.	Tabatha Watkins	TKO (punches)	2	3:25
Middleweight	Pat McCrohan	def.	Jason Markland	TKO (punches)	1	1:11

== Bellator 216 ==
Bellator 216: MVP vs. Daley
- Date: February 16, 2019
- Venue: Mohegan Sun Arena
- City: Uncasville, Connecticut
- Attendance: 9,624
- Total gate: $1,005,708

Bellator 216: MVP vs. Daley took place on February 16, 2019 at Mohegan Sun Arena in Uncasville, Connecticut. The event aired on DAZN and Sky Sports in the UK live.

Background

The event featured a Quarter-Final round bout in the Bellator Welterweight World Grand Prix between Michael Page and Paul Daley in the main event.

On January 10, 2019 it was reported that a welterweight bout between Erick Silva and Yaroslav Amosov was added to the event.

The card also featured the Bellator MMA debut of former K-1, Pride and UFC fighter Mirko Cro Cop, as he faced Roy Nelson in a rematch. The pair previously fought seven-and-a-half years ago at UFC 137.

Results

Fight card
Weight class				Method	Round	Time	Notes
Welterweight	Michael Page	def.	Paul Daley	Decision (unanimous) (48–47, 48–47, 48–47)	5	5:00	(Note: Bellator Welterweight World Grand Prix Quarter-final.)
Heavyweight	Mirko Cro Cop	def.	Roy Nelson	Decision (unanimous) (30–27, 29–28, 29–28)	3	5:00
Heavyweight	Cheick Kongo	def.	Vitaly Minakov	Decision (unanimous) (30–27, 29–28, 29–28)	3	5:00
Welterweight	Yaroslav Amosov	def.	Erick Silva	Decision (unanimous) (29–27, 29–28, 29–28)	3	5:00
Women's Flyweight	Valerie Loureda	def.	Colby Fletcher	TKO (punches)	1	2:55
Preliminary card (Bellator.com and Bellator Mobile App)
Welterweight	Demetrios Plaza	def.	Andrews Rodriguez	Decision (unanimous) (29–28, 29–27, 29–27)	3	5:00
Middleweight	Justin Sumter	def.	Reginaldo Felix	Submission (rear-naked choke)	2	3:27
Catchweight (165 lb)	Kemran Lachinov	def.	Kastriot Xhema	Submission (kneebar)	2	0:53
Heavyweight	Tyrell Fortune	def.	Ryan Pokryfky	TKO (knee and punches)	1	2:21
Welterweight	Vinicius De Jesus	def.	Rodolpho Barcellos	TKO (punches)	1	3:46
Welterweight	Jesse Kosakowski	def.	Rodolfo Rocha	Submission (rear-naked choke)	2	3:05
Lightweight	Nekruz Mirkhojaev	def.	Pat Casey	Submission (neck crank)	3	1:18

== Bellator 217 ==
Bellator 217: Gallagher vs. Graham
- Date: February 23, 2019
- Venue: 3Arena
- City: Dublin, Ireland
- Attendance: 13,150
- Total gate: €850,003 (IEP) / $1,228,868 (USD)

Bellator 217: Gallagher vs. Graham took place on February 23, 2019 at 3Arena in Dublin, Ireland. The event aired on Paramount Network, DAZN and Sky Sports in the UK and Ireland.

Background

This card marked Bellator's third event held in Ireland.

The event featured a bantamweight bout between James Gallagher and Steven Graham in the main event.

Results

Fight card
Weight class				Method	Round	Time	Notes
Bantamweight	James Gallagher	def.	Steven Graham	Submission (rear-naked choke)	1	2:31
Lightweight	Myles Price	def.	Peter Queally	Decision (split) (28–29, 29–28, 29–28)	3	5:00
Welterweight	Kiefer Crosbie	def.	Daniel Olejniczak	Submission (rear-naked choke)	1	4:09
Featherweight	Richie Smullen	def.	Adam Gustab	Decision (unanimous) (30–26, 30–27, 30–27)	3	5:00
Preliminary card (Bellator.com and Bellator Mobile App)
Middleweight	Charlie Ward	def.	Jamie Stephenson	KO (punch)	1	0:34
Lightweight	Paul Redmond	def.	Charlie Leary	Decision (unanimous) (29–28, 29–28, 29–28)	3	5:00
Welterweight	Richard Kiely	def.	Mickael Bucher	KO (punch)	1	4:21
Welterweight	Walter Gahadza	def.	Ruben Crawford	TKO (head kick and punches)	1	1:59
Flyweight	Ryan Curtis	def.	Luis Gonzales	TKO (knee and punches)	1	4:59
Catchweight (148 lbs)	Leah McCourt	def.	Hatice Ozyurt	TKO (doctor stoppage)	1	5:00	(Note: Ozyurt missed weight and was fined 20% of her purse.)
Women's Featherweight	Olga Rubin	def.	Iony Razafiarison	Decision (unanimous) (29–28, 29–28, 29–28)	3	5:00
Middleweight	Will Fleury	def.	Shaun Taylor	Submission (rear-naked choke)	2	1:32
Lightweight	Alfie Davis	def.	Daniele Scatizzi	Decision (unanimous) (30–27, 29–28, 29–28)	3	5:00
Preliminary card (Dark bouts)
Lightweight	Chris Duncan	def.	Samuel Slater	TKO (punches)	1	3:52
Featherweight	Dylan Logan	def.	Andrew Murphy	Submission (armbar)	1	2:41
Bantamweight	George Courtney	def.	Ian Cleary	Submission (guillotine choke)	3	0:54

== Bellator 218 ==
Bellator 218: Sanchez vs. Karakhanyan 2
- Date: March 22, 2019
- Venue: WinStar World Casino
- City: Thackerville, Oklahoma
- Attendance: 1,013
- Total gate: $200,935

Bellator 218: Sanchez vs. Karakhanyan 2 took place on March 22, 2019 at WinStar World Casino in Thackerville, Oklahoma The event aired on Paramount Network and DAZN.

Background

The event was to feature a featherweight main event bout between Emmanuel Sanchez and Ashleigh Grimshaw; However, the promotion announced that March 8 that Georgi Karakhanyan replaced Grimshaw due to undisclosed reasons. The two previous met at Bellator 170 where Sanchez won by a close decision.

A Light Heavyweight bout between Christian Edwards and Roman Huerta was cancelled the day of the weigh-in. Huerta did not weigh in as he was reportedly more than five pounds heavier than Edwards.

Results

Fight card
Weight class				Method	Round	Time	Notes
Featherweight	Emmanuel Sanchez	def.	Georgi Karakhanyan	Decision (unanimous) (29–28, 29–28, 29–28)	3	5:00
Heavyweight	Valentin Moldavsky	def.	Linton Vassell	Decision (unanimous) (29–27, 29–27, 29–27)	3	5:00
Middleweight	Anatoly Tokov	def.	Gerald Harris	Submission (guillotine choke)	2	0:37
Middleweight	Norbert Növényi Jr.	def.	William Lavine	Submission (arm-triangle choke)	2	4:05
Preliminary card (Bellator.com and Bellator App)
Women's Catchweight (130 lb)	Deborah Kouzmin	def.	Ky Bennett	Decision (unanimous) (30–27, 30–27, 30–27)	3	5:00
Middleweight	Johnny Eblen	def.	Chauncey Foxworth	Decision (unanimous) (30–27, 30–27, 30–27)	3	5:00
Featherweight	John Macapa	def.	Kevin Croom	Decision (unanimous) (30–26, 29–27, 30–26)	3	5:00
Middleweight	Jordan Newman	def.	Joseph Holmes	Decision (unanimous) (30–27, 29–28, 29–28)	3	5:00
Lightweight	Vladimir Tokov	def.	Ryan Walker	Decision (unanimous) (29–28, 29–28, 29–28)	3	5:00
Women's Flyweight	Victoria Leonardo	def.	Malin Hermansson	Submission (armbar)	1	4:49
Postliminary card (Bellator.com and Bellator App)
Lightweight	Nation Gibrick	def.	Nicholas Page	Submission (rear-naked choke)	1	3:14
Bantamweight	Isaiah Gutierrez	def.	Aaron Vickers	Decision (unanimous) (30–27, 30–26, 30–26)	3	5:00
Lightweight	Luis Erives	def.	Craig Fairley	TKO (punches)	2	2:40

== Bellator 219 ==
Bellator 219: Awad vs. Girtz
- Date: March 29, 2019
- Venue: Pechanga Resort & Casino
- City: Temecula, California
- Attendance: 1,167
- Total gate: $301,471

Bellator 219: Awad vs. Girtz took place on March 29, 2019 at Pechanga Resort & Casino in Temecula, California. The event aired on Paramount Network and DAZN.

Background

The event was expected to feature a welterweight bout between Andrey Koreshkov and Lorenz Larkin. However, Larkin pulled out on March 1 due to undisclosed reasons. Koreshkov remained on the card facing Michael Jasper.

A lightweight bout between Saad Awad and Brandon Girtz was announced as the new main event.

Results

Fight card
Weight class				Method	Round	Time	Notes
Lightweight	Brandon Girtz	def.	Saad Awad	Decision (unanimous) (29–28, 30–27, 29–28)	3	5:00
Lightweight	Daniel Straus	def.	Shane Kruchten	Submission (rear-naked choke)	1	3:53
Welterweight	Andrey Koreshkov	def.	Michael Jasper	Decision (unanimous) (30–27, 30–27, 30–27)	3	5:00
Middleweight	Joe Schilling	def.	Keith Berry	Decision (unanimous) (30–26, 30–26, 30–26)	3	5:00
Preliminary card (Bellator.com and Bellator App)
Welterweight	Joey Davis	def.	Marcus Anthony	KO (punches)	1	4:21
Light Heavyweight	Dalton Rosta	def.	Cody Vidal	Verbal Submission (injury)	1	1:06
Postliminary card (Bellator.com and Bellator App)
Lightweight	Sunni Imhotep	def.	Eugene Correa	KO (punch)	1	0:44
Bantamweight	Ricky Furar	def.	Roman Puga	TKO (doctor stoppage)	2	5:00
Catchweight (175 lb)	John Mercurio	def.	Johnny Cisneros	Decision (majority) (28–28, 29–28, 29–28)	3	5:00
Lightweight	Darren Smith	def.	Joshua Jones	KO (punches)	1	0:34
Women's Featherweight	Janay Harding	def.	Marina Mokhnatkina	Decision (unanimous) (29–28, 29–27, 29–28)	3	5:00
Welterweight	David Rickels	def.	A.J. Matthews	TKO (punch)	2	3:24
Bantamweight	Shawn Bunch	def.	Dominic Mazzotta	Decision (unanimous) (30–27, 29–28, 30–27)	3	5:00

== Bellator 220 ==
Bellator 220: MacDonald vs. Fitch
- Date: April 27, 2019
- Venue: SAP Center
- City: San Jose, California
- Attendance: 12,287
- Total gate: $1,179,426

Bellator 220: MacDonald vs. Fitch took place on April 27, 2019 at SAP Center in San Jose, California. The event aired live on DAZN.

Background

The event featured in the main event a Bellator Welterweight World Championship bout between the champion Rory MacDonald and Jon Fitch. The bout served as both a title defense for MacDonald and a quarter-final match in the Bellator Welterweight World Grand Prix.

The event featured a Bellator Women's Flyweight World Championship bout between the champion Ilima-Lei Macfarlane and Veta Arteaga.

Results

Fight card (DAZN)
Weight class				Method	Round	Time	Notes
Welterweight	Rory MacDonald (c)	vs.	Jon Fitch	Draw (majority) (46–48, 47–47, 47–47)	5	5:00	(Note: Bellator Welterweight World Grand Prix Quarter-final for the Bellator Welterweight World Championship.)
Women's Flyweight	Ilima-Lei Macfarlane (c)	def.	Veta Arteaga	TKO (doctor stoppage – forehead cut)	3	1:50	(Note: For the Bellator Women's Flyweight World Championship.)
Lightweight	Benson Henderson	def.	Adam Piccolotti	Decision (split) (29–28, 28–29, 29–28)	3	5:00
Light Heavyweight	Phil Davis	def.	Liam McGeary	TKO (punches)	3	4:11
Lightweight	Gaston Bolanos	def.	Nathan Stolen	KO (punches)	1	2:21
Preliminary card (Bellator.com and Bellator App)
Welterweight	Abraham Vaesau	def.	Justin Roswell	TKO (punches)	1	1:59
Middleweight	Jordan Williams	def.	Diego Herzog	TKO (punches)	3	1:21
Catchweight (140 lb)	Josh San Diego	def.	Brandon Laroco	Decision (split) (30–27, 30–27, 30–26)	3	5:00
Featherweight	Hyder Amil	def.	Paradise Vaovasa	Submission (rear-naked choke)	1	2:34
Light Heavyweight	Chuck Campbell	def.	Bruno Casillas	KO (knee and punch)	1	1:46
Bantamweight	Cass Bell	def.	Peter Ishiguro	KO (knee and punches)	1	3:00
Lightweight	Aviv Gozali	def.	Travis Crain	Submission (rear-naked choke)	1	2:15
Lightweight	Brandon Faumui	def.	Chris Avila	Decision (split) (30–27, 28–29, 29–28)	3	5:00
Flyweight	Matthew Perez	def.	Justin Tenedora	KO (punches)	1	4:52
Postliminary card (Dark)
Catchweight (131 lb)	Eric Gunha	vs.	Jon Adams	Draw (majority) (29–27, 28–28, 28–28)	3	5:00
Welterweight	Tom Ponce De Leon	def.	Jamario Mulder	Decision (unanimous) (29–27, 29–27, 30–27)	3	5:00
Featherweight	Chris Inocencio	def.	Boris Novachkov	Decision (split) (29–28, 28–29, 29–28)	3	5:00
Featherweight	Ignacio Ortiz	vs.	Roger Severson	Draw (unanimous) (28–28, 28–28, 28–28)	3	5:00

== Bellator Birmingham ==
Bellator Birmingham: Primus vs. Wilde
- Date: May 4, 2019
- Venue: Resorts World Arena
- City: Birmingham, England
- Attendance: 10,064
- Total gate: £804,413 (GBP) / $1,042,660 (USD)

Bellator Birmingham: Primus vs. Wilde took place on May 4, 2019 at Resorts World Arena in Birmingham, England.

Background

This is the second event in the Bellator European series.

The event featured a lightweight bout between former champion Brent Primus and Tim Wilde.

Results

Fight card
Weight class				Method	Round	Time	Notes
Lightweight	Brent Primus	def.	Tim Wilde	Submission (gogoplata)	1	1:20
Middleweight	Fabian Edwards	def.	Falco Neto	TKO (upkicks and punches)	1	3:51
Lightweight	Pedro Carvalho	def.	Derek Campos	KO (punches)	1	2:03
Welterweight	Raymond Daniels	def.	Wilker Barros	KO (punch)	1	4:36
Preliminary card
Featherweight	Saul Rogers	def.	Aiden Lee	Decision (unanimous) (30–27, 30–27, 30–27)	3	5:00
Bantamweight	Brian Moore	def.	Binh Son Le	Decision (unanimous) (30–26, 30–25, 30–25)	3	5:00
Lightweight	Kane Mousah	def.	Mateusz Piskorz	Decision (unanimous) (30–27, 30–27, 30–27)	3	5:00
Light Heavyweight	Lee Chadwick	def.	James Mulheron	Decision (unanimous) (29–28, 30–27, 30–27)	3	5:00
Light Heavyweight	Yannick Bahati	def.	Amir Dadović	Submission (kimura)	1	3:00
Featherweight	Dominique Wooding	def.	David Khalsa	TKO (punches)	1	2:43
Welterweight	Jim Wallhead	def.	Giorgio Pietrini	Decision (unanimous) (29–27, 30–26, 30–27)	3	5:00
Lightweight	Gavin Hughes	def.	Mohammad Yahya	Submission (rear-naked choke)	2	4:51
Welterweight	Ashley Reece	def.	Craig Turner	Decision (unanimous) (30–27, 30–27, 30–27)	3	5:00
Lightweight	Dan Cassell	def.	John Nicholls	TKO (punches)	1	3:09
Lightweight	Akonne Wanliss	def.	Samuel Slater	TKO (punches)	2	3:55
Bantamweight	Raphael Uchegbu	def.	Lee Percival	Submission (triangle choke)	1	2:14
Welterweight	Nicolo Solli	def.	Simon Ridgway	TKO (punches)	2	4:32
Lightweight	Kieran Lister	vs.	Constantin Gnusariev	Draw (split) (29–28, 27–29, 28–28)	3	5:00

== Bellator 221 ==
Bellator 221: Chandler vs. Pitbull
- Date: May 11, 2019
- Venue: Allstate Arena
- City: Rosemont, Illinois
- Attendance: 12,936
- Total gate: $1,283,059

Bellator 221: Chandler vs. Pitbull took place on May 11, 2019 at Allstate Arena in Rosemont, Illinois. The event was aired exclusively on DAZN.

Background

The event featured a Bellator Lightweight Championship bout between the champion Michael Chandler and current Bellator Featherweight Champion Patrício Pitbull.

Results

Fight card (DAZN)
Weight class				Method	Round	Time	Notes
Lightweight	Patrício Pitbull	def.	Michael Chandler (c)	TKO (punches)	1	1:01	(Note: For the Bellator Lightweight World Championship.)
Welterweight	Douglas Lima	def.	Michael Page	KO (punch)	2	0:35	(Note: Bellator Welterweight World Grand Prix Semi-final.)
Featherweight	A. J. McKee	def.	Pat Curran	Decision (unanimous) (30–27, 30–27, 30–26)	3	5:00
Heavyweight	Jake Hager	def.	T.J Jones	Submission (arm-triangle choke)	1	2:36
Featherweight	Tywan Claxton	def.	James Bennett	TKO (punches)	3	2:09
Preliminary card (Paramount Network.com)
Bantamweight	Robert Fenicle	def.	Bryan Bautista	Submission (heel hook)	1	1:42
Welterweight	Khuukhenkhuu Amartuvshin	def.	Adam Ward	Decision (unanimous) (29–28, 29–28, 29–28)	3	5:00
Flyweight	Christian Rodriguez	def.	Jose Leon	Submission (armbar)	1	4:35
Middleweight	Robert Morrow	def.	James Bochnovic	KO (punches)	1	1:18
Welterweight	Chris Gonzalez	def.	Charlie Radtke	Decision (unanimous) (29–28, 29–28, 29–28)	3	5:00
Featherweight	Chris Lencioni	def.	Adil Benjilany	Submission (triangle choke)	1	4:55
Heavyweight	Jason Belyew	vs.	Dave Latoria	No Contest (accidental groin kick)	1	N/A
Flyweight	Jesse Bazzi	def.	Joey Diehl	Decision (unanimous) (30–27, 30–27, 30–27)	3	5:00
Welterweight	Josh Streacker	def.	Scott Writz	KO (punches)	2	3:33

== Bellator 222 ==
Bellator 222: MacDonald vs. Gracie
- Date: June 14, 2019
- Venue: Madison Square Garden
- City: New York, New York
- Attendance: 13,937
- Total gate: $1,814,132

Bellator 222: MacDonald vs. Gracie took place on June 14, 2019 at Madison Square Garden in New York, New York. The event aired exclusively on DAZN.

Background

The event featured a Bellator Welterweight Championship bout between the champion Rory MacDonald and Neiman Gracie. The bout served as both a title defense for MacDonald and a semi-final match in the Bellator Welterweight World Grand Prix.

The event also featured a light heavyweight bout between former UFC Light Heavyweight Champion Lyoto Machida and Chael Sonnen, as well as a Bellator Bantamweight Championship bout between current champ Darrion Caldwell and Kyoji Horiguchi. The bout was a rematch from the 2018 meeting between the two that took place at RIZIN 14 on New Year's Eve.

Results

Fight card (DAZN)
Weight class				Method	Round	Time	Notes
Welterweight	Rory MacDonald (c)	def.	Neiman Gracie	Decision (unanimous) (49–46, 48–47, 48–47)	5	5:00	(Note: Bellator Welterweight World Grand Prix Semi-final for the Bellator Welterweight World Championship.)
Light Heavyweight	Lyoto Machida	def.	Chael Sonnen	TKO (flying knee and punches)	2	0:22
Catchweight (175 lb)	Dillon Danis	def.	Max Humphrey	Submission (armbar)	1	4:28
Bantamweight	Patchy Mix	def.	Ricky Bandejas	Submission (rear-naked choke)	1	1:06
Featherweight	Juan Archuleta	def.	Eduardo Dantas	KO (punch)	2	4:59
Bantamweight	Kyoji Horiguchi	def.	Darrion Caldwell (c)	Decision (unanimous) (48–47, 49–46, 49–46)	5	5:00	(Note: For the Bellator Bantamweight World Championship.)
Preliminary card
Flyweight	Brandon Polcare	def.	Brandon Medina	Submission (guillotine choke)	1	4:33
Catchweight (165 lb)	Kastriot Xhema	def.	Whitney Francois	TKO (punches)	2	3:17
Featherweight	John Beneduce	def.	Kenny Rivera	Decision (unanimous) (30–26, 30–27, 30–27)	3	5:00
Catchweight (128 lb)	Taylor Turner	def.	Heather Hardy	TKO (punches)	1	3:53
Featherweight	Ádám Borics	def.	Aaron Pico	KO (flying knee and punches)	2	3:55
Women's Flyweight	Valerie Loureda	def.	Larkyn Dasch	Decision (unanimous) (29–28, 30–27, 30–27)	3	5:00
Catchweight (112 lb)	Lindsey VanZandt	def.	Rena Kubota	Technical Submission (rear-naked choke)	1	4:04
Catchweight (180 lb)	Haim Gozali	def.	Gustavo Wurlitzer	Submission (triangle choke)	1	4:02
Bantamweight	Mike Kimbel	def.	Sebastian Ruiz	Decision (split) (28–29, 30–27, 30–27)	3	5:00
Welterweight	Robson Gracie Jr.	def.	Oscar Vera	Submission (armbar)	1	3:15
Lightweight	Marcus Surin	def.	Nekruz Mirkhojaev	Decision (unanimous) (30–27, 29–27, 29–27)	3	5:00
Middleweight	Phil Hawes	def.	Michael Wilcox	TKO (doctor stoppage)	1	5:00

== Bellator 223 ==
Bellator London/Bellator 223
- Date: June 22, 2019
- Venue: SSE Arena
- City: London, England
- Attendance: 11,768
- Total gate: £853,146 (GBP) $1,087,087 (USD)

Bellator London/Bellator 223 took place on June 22, 2019 at SSE Arena in London, England.

Background

The event marked the third event in Bellator's European series, with the Bellator London portion of the card airing on Channel 5 in the UK, including the five-round middleweight title fight between current champ Gegard Mousasi and Rafael Lovato Jr.

The five fights billed as Bellator 223 will take place on Paramount Network and DAZN, with the headlining bout featuring Paul Daley and Erick Silva in a welterweight contest.

The event featured a Bellator Middleweight World Championship bout between Gegard Mousasi and Rafael Lovato Jr.

Melvin Manhoef returned to action for the first time since 2017 at the event, facing England's Kent Kauppinen.

Results

Bellator London card
Weight class				Method	Round	Time	Notes
Middleweight	Rafael Lovato Jr.	def.	Gegard Mousasi (c)	Decision (majority) (47–47, 48–47, 48–47)	5	5:00	(Note: For the Bellator Middleweight World Championship.)
Light Heavyweight	Melvin Manhoef	def.	Kent Kauppinen	Decision (unanimous) (29–28, 29–28, 29–28)	3	5:00
Catchweight (160 lb)	Aaron Chalmers	def.	Fred Freeman	Submission (triangle choke)	2	4:05
Bellator 223 card
Welterweight	Paul Daley	def.	Erick Silva	Decision (unanimous) (29–27, 29–27, 29–27)	3	5:00
Catchweight (140 lb)	James Gallagher	def.	Jeremiah Labiano	Decision (unanimous) (29–28, 29–28, 29–28)	3	5:00
Middleweight	Fabian Edwards	def.	Jonathan Bosuku	Decision (unanimous) (30–27, 30–27, 30–27)	3	5:00
Women's Flyweight	Denise Kielholtz	def.	Bryony Tyrell	TKO (punches)	3	2:48
Middleweight	Costello van Steenis	def.	Mike Shipman	KO (punches)	2	1:34
Middleweight	Charlie Ward	def.	Justin Moore	TKO (punches)	2	3:23
Bellator 223 Preliminary card
Lightweight	Charlie Leary	def.	Chris Bungard	Decision (unanimous) (30–25, 30–25, 30–25)	3	5:00
Women's Flyweight	Kate Jackson	def.	Lena Ovchynnikova	TKO (doctor stoppage)	1	4:20
Catchweight (161 lb)	Terry Brazier	def.	Alessandro Botti	Submission (americana)	3	2:17
Featherweight	Luke Ord	def.	Nathan Rose	Decision (unanimous) (29–27, 29–28, 30–25)	3	5:00
Lightweight	Alfie Davis	def.	Jorge Kanella	Decision (unanimous) (29–27, 29–27, 29–27)	3	5:00
Welterweight	Justin Burlinson	def.	Wendle Lewis	TKO (verbal submission due to knee injury)	1	0:09
Welterweight	Galore Bofando	def.	Keith McCabe	Decision (unanimous) (29–28, 30–27, 30–27)	3	5:00
Middleweight	Kevin Fryer	def.	John Redmond	Decision (split) (29–28, 28–29, 29–28)	3	5:00
Bantamweight	Frans Mlambo	def.	Nathan Greyson	Submission (D'Arce choke)	2	4:22
Postliminary card (Dark)
Welterweight	Oliver Enkamp	def.	Walter Gahadza	Submission (rear-naked choke)	1	4:54

== Bellator 224 ==
Bellator 224: Budd vs. Rubin
- Date: July 12, 2019
- Venue: WinStar World Casino
- City: Thackerville, Oklahoma
- Attendance: 1,008
- Total gate: $200,896

Bellator 224: Budd vs. Rubin took place on July 12, 2019 at WinStar World Casino in Thackerville, Oklahoma. The event took place on Paramount Network and DAZN.

Background

The event featured a Bellator Women's Featherweight Championship between Julia Budd and Olga Rubin.

Results

Fight card
Weight class				Method	Round	Time	Notes
Women's Featherweight	Julia Budd (c)	def.	Olga Rubin	TKO (body kick and punches)	1	2:14	(Note: For the Bellator Women's Featherweight Championship.)
Catchweight (190 lb)	Rafael Carvalho	def.	Chidi Njokuani	Decision (unanimous) (29–28, 29–28, 29–28)	3	5:00
Women's Flyweight	Juliana Velasquez	def.	Kristina Williams	TKO (punches)	2	4:03
Welterweight	Ed Ruth	def.	Kiichi Kunimoto	TKO (knee and punches)	2	3:49
Preliminary card (Bellator.com and Bellator App)
Lightweight	Nainoa Dung	def.	Bradley Robison	Decision (unanimous) (28–27, 28–27, 28–27)	3	5:00
Featherweight	Gabriel Varga	def.	Jamese Taylor	TKO (punches)	2	3:23
Catchweight (165 lb)	Mike Jackson	def.	Kiefer Crosbie	DQ (illegal knee)	1	1:46
Women's Featherweight	Leslie Smith	def.	Sinead Kavanagh	Decision (majority) (28–28, 29–28, 29–28)	3	5:00
Light Heavyweight	Jordan Young	def.	Joel Bauman	Submission (triangle choke)	1	3:20
Women's Featherweight	Arlene Blencowe	def.	Amanda Bell	KO (punches)	1	0:22
Catchweight (190 lb)	Will Fleury	def.	Antonio Jones	Decision (unanimous) (30–26, 30–27, 30–27)	3	5:00
Lightweight	AJ Agazarm	def.	Jacob Landin	Submission (rear-naked choke)	1	4:21
Light Heavyweight	Christian Edwards	def.	Justin Vargas	TKO (punches and elbows)	1	0:54
Postliminary card (Bellator App and DAZN)
Featherweight	Lucas Brennan	def.	Thomas Lopez	Submission (rear-naked choke)	1	3:02
Women's Flyweight	Bruna Ellen	def.	Elina Kallionidou	Decision (unanimous) (30–27, 29–28, 29–28)	3	5:00
Welterweight	Joseph Holmes	def.	Kona Oliveira	Submission (rear-naked choke)	2	2:41

== Bellator 225 ==
Bellator 225: Mitrione vs. Kharitonov 2
- Date: August 24, 2019
- Venue: Webster Bank Arena
- City: Bridgeport, Connecticut
- Attendance: 6,631
- Total gate: $648,141

Bellator 225: Mitrione vs. Kharitonov 2 was a mixed martial arts event that took place on August 24, 2019 at Webster Bank Arena in Bridgeport, Connecticut. The event took place on Paramount Network and DAZN.

Background

This marked the second major MMA event to take place in Connecticut proper, after CES 56, rather than on tribal or reservation land, and will be overseen by the Connecticut Boxing Commission.

The event featured a heavyweight rematch between Matt Mitrione and Sergei Kharitonov. The two met earlier in the year at Bellator 215 where the bout ended in a no contest 15 seconds into the bout due to an accidental groin kick.

Vitaly Minakov was originally scheduled to face Javy Ayala on the card. However, the day of the event it was announced that Ayala was pulled from the fight by the Connecticut Boxing Commission due to an undisclosed medical reason; as a result Timothy Johnson moved up from a preliminary bout against Azunna Anyanwu to face Minakov in the co-main event.

Bellator 225 became the first event in the organizational history where every bout ended via stoppage.

Results

Fight card
Weight class				Method	Round	Time	Notes
Heavyweight	Sergei Kharitonov	def.	Matt Mitrione	TKO (knee and punches)	2	1:24
Heavyweight	Vitaly Minakov	def.	Timothy Johnson	KO (punches)	1	1:45
Women's Bantamweight	Alejandra Lara	def.	Taylor Turner	TKO (punches)	1	3:44
Catchweight (175 lb)	Yaroslav Amosov	def.	David Rickels	Submission (D'Arce choke)	2	4:05
Heavyweight	Tyrell Fortune	def.	Rudy Schaffroth	Submission (rear-naked choke)	2	2:08
Preliminary card
Lightweight	Nick Newell	def.	Corey Browning	Submission (arm-triangle choke)	1	3:15
Catchweight (165 lb)	Connor Dixon	def.	Kastriot Xhema	Submission (armbar)	3	2:08
Catchweight (175 lb)	Jon Manley	def.	Thiago Rela	Submission (rear-naked choke)	3	4:47
Catchweight (140 lb)	Chris Disonell	def.	Mike Kimbel	TKO (punches)	1	4:54
Bantamweight	Ricky Bandejas	def.	Ahmet Kayretli	KO (punches)	1	1:21
Middleweight	Austin Vanderford	def.	Joseph Creer	TKO (doctor stoppage)	2	5:00
Welterweight	Sabah Homasi	def.	Micah Terrill	KO (punch)	1	0:17
Catchweight (165 lb)	Aviv Gozali	def.	Eduard Muravitsky	Submission (heel hook)	1	0:11
Welterweight	Khonry Gracie	def.	Oscar Vera	Submission (armbar)	1	2:50

== Bellator 226 ==
Bellator 226: Bader vs. Kongo
- Date: September 7, 2019
- Venue: SAP Center
- City: San Jose, California
- Attendance: 13,224
- Total gate: $1,289,684

Bellator 226: Bader vs. Kongo took place on September 7, 2019 at SAP Center in San Jose, California. The event took place on DAZN.

Background

The event featured the first four bouts in the Bellator Featherweight World Grand Prix.

The event also featured a Bellator Heavyweight Championship bout between the champion Ryan Bader and Cheick Kongo.

Results

Fight card (DAZN)
Weight class				Method	Round	Time	Notes
Heavyweight	Ryan Bader (c)	vs.	Cheick Kongo	No Contest (accidental eye poke)	1	3:52	(Note: For the Bellator Heavyweight Championship.)
Featherweight	Derek Campos	def.	Daniel Straus	Decision (unanimous) (30-26, 30-25, 30-25)	3	5:00	(Note: Bellator Featherweight World Grand Prix First Round bout.)
Featherweight	Ádám Borics	def.	Pat Curran	TKO (punches)	2	4:59	(Note: Bellator Featherweight World Grand Prix First Round bout.)
Featherweight	Pedro Carvalho	def.	Sam Sicilia	Submission (neck crank)	2	1:56	(Note: Bellator Featherweight World Grand Prix First Round bout.)
Featherweight	Emmanuel Sanchez	def.	Tywan Claxton	Submission (triangle choke)	2	4:11	(Note: Bellator Featherweight World Grand Prix First Round bout.)
Featherweight	Daniel Carey	def.	Gaston Bolanos	Technical Submission (guillotine choke)	1	4:19
Preliminary card (Bellator App)
Featherweight	John Teixeira	def.	Ashleigh Grimshaw	TKO (corner stoppage)	2	5:00
Lightweight	Adam Piccolotti	def.	Jacob Smith	Submission (rear-naked choke)	2	2:34
Women's Featherweight	Jessica Borga	def.	Amber Leibrock	Submission (armbar)	1	4:45
Bantamweight	Cass Bell	def.	Isaiah Rocha	Submission (guillotine choke)	1	1:21
Welterweight	Batsumberel Dagvadorj	def.	James Terry	Submission (bulldog choke)	1	2:43
Welterweight	Renato Alves	def.	Abraham Vaesau	Submission (rear-naked choke)	3	3:36
Featherweight	Hyder Amil	def.	Ignacio Ortiz	Decision (split) (29-28, 28-29, 29-28)	3	5:00
Lightweight	Chris Gonzalez	def.	Luis Vargas	Decision (unanimous) (30-27, 30-26. 30-25)	3	5:00
Postliminary card (Bellator App/DAZN)
Middleweight	Ivan Batinich	def.	Daniel Compton	Submission (rear-naked choke)	2	4:33
Catchweight (180 lb)	Tyson Miller	def.	Albert Gonzalez	TKO (injury)	1	1:18
Middleweight	Alan Benson	def.	Favian Gutierrez	Decision (split) (28-29, 29-28, 29-28)	3	5:00
Catchweight (140 lb)	Peter Ishiguro	def.	Elias Anderson	Decision (unanimous) (29-28, 29-28, 29-28)	3	5:00
Flyweight	Daniel Gonzalez	def.	Jonathan Adams	TKO (submission due to strikes)	2	4:56
Middleweight	Cornelius Savage	def.	Evan Gubera	Decision (split) (29-28, 28-29, 29-28)	3	5:00

== Bellator Dublin/Bellator 227 ==
Bellator Dublin/Bellator 227
- Date: September 27, 2019
- Venue: 3Arena
- City: Dublin, Ireland
- Attendance: 12,920
- Total gate: €1,175,379 (EURO) / $1,288,072 (USD)

Bellator Dublin/Bellator 227 took place on September 27, 2019 at 3Arena in Dublin, Ireland. The event marked the fourth event in Bellator's European series, with the Bellator Dublin portion of the card airing on Channel 5 in the UK.

Background

The Bellator Dublin main event was original a bantamweight bout between James Gallagher and Cal Ellenor. However, Ellenor pulled out on September 16 due to injury. Gallagher instead fought UFC veteran Roman Salazar.

The fights billed as Bellator 227 took place on Paramount Network and DAZN, with the headlining bout featuring former WEC and UFC Lightweight Champion Benson Henderson and Myles Jury.

Brandon Girtz was expected to face Paul Redmond at the event. Redmond pulled out on September 4 due to injury. Girtz was instead to face Bellator newcomer Jon Tuck. The bout was canceled after Girtz pulled out due to injury.

Results

Bellator Dublin card
Weight class				Method	Round	Time	Notes
Featherweight	James Gallagher	def.	Roman Salazar	Submission (guillotine choke)	1	0:35
Women's Strawweight	Danni Neilan	def.	Camila Rivarola	Decision (unanimous) (29-28, 29-28, 30-27)	3	5:00
Welterweight	Michael Page	def.	Richard Kiely	KO (flying knee)	1	2:47
Lightweight	Peter Queally	def.	Ryan Scope	TKO (punches)	2	3:07
Bellator 227 card
Lightweight	Benson Henderson	def.	Myles Jury	Decision (unanimous) (30-27, 30-27, 30-27)	3	5:00
Catchweight (160 lb)	Kiefer Crosbie	def.	Hugo Pereira	Decision (unanimous) (29-28, 29-28, 30-27)	3	5:00
Middleweight	Norbert Növényi Jr.	def.	Will Fleury	Decision (unanimous) (30-26, 30-26, 30-27)	3	5:00
Women's Featherweight	Leah McCourt	def.	Kerry Hughes	Technical Submission (rear-naked choke)	1	2:14
Bantamweight	Frans Mlambo	def.	Dominique Wooding	Decision (unanimous) (30-27, 30-27, 30-28)	3	5:00
Bellator 227 Preliminary card
Featherweight	Richie Smullen	def.	Sean Tobin	Technical Submission (rear-naked choke)	1	2:43
Lightweight	Ryan Roddy	def.	Patrik Pietilla	Decision (unanimous) (29-27, 29-27, 29-27)	3	5:00
Featherweight	Ilias Bulaid	def.	Vitalic Maiboroda	KO (knee)	1	4:59
Light Heavyweight	Karl Moore	def.	Lee Chadwick	Decision (split) (30-27, 28-29, 29-28)	3	5:00
Welterweight	Philip Mulpeter	def.	Keith McCabe	Decision (split) (27-30, 29-28, 29-28)	3	5:00
Flyweight	Jacob Hadley	def.	Blaine O'Driscoll	Submission (rear-naked choke)	3	3:14
Featherweight	Dylan Logan	def.	Adam Gustab	Submission (triangle choke)	2	2:14
Welterweight	Constantin Gnusariev	def.	Ian Coughlan	Decision (unanimous) (29-28, 29-28, 30-27)	3	5:00
Postliminary card
Featherweight	Ciaran Clarke	def.	George Courtney	Submission (rear-naked choke)	3	2:19

== Bellator 228 ==
Bellator 228: Machida vs. Mousasi 2
- Date: September 28, 2019
- Venue: The Forum
- City: Inglewood, California
- Attendance: 12,268
- Total gate: $1,190,188

Bellator 228: Machida vs. Mousasi 2 took place on September 28, 2019 at The Forum in Inglewood, California. The event will take place on DAZN.

Background

The event was headlined by a rematch between Lyoto Machida and Gegard Mousasi. The pair previously met on February 15, 2014 in the main event at UFC Fight Night 36. Machida won the earlier bout by unanimous decision.

The event also featured a Bellator Featherweight World Championship bout between the champion Patricio Freire and Juan Archuleta, a first round bout in the Bellator Featherweight World Grand Prix.

Results

Fight card
Weight class				Method	Round	Time	Notes
Middleweight	Gegard Mousasi	def.	Lyoto Machida	Decision (split) (29-28, 27-30, 29-28)	3	5:00
Featherweight	Patrício Pitbull (c)	def.	Juan Archuleta	Decision (unanimous) (49-46, 50-45, 49-46)	5	5:00	(Note: Bellator Featherweight World Grand Prix First Round bout for the Bellator Featherweight World Championship.)
Featherweight	A. J. McKee	def.	Georgi Karakhanyan	KO (punches)	1	0:08	(Note: Bellator Featherweight World Grand Prix First Round bout.)
Featherweight	Darrion Caldwell	def.	Henry Corrales	Decision (unanimous) (29-27, 30-27, 30-27)	3	5:00	(Note: Bellator Featherweight World Grand Prix First Round bout.)
Featherweight	Daniel Weichel	def.	Saul Rogers	Decision (unanimous) (29-28, 30-27, 29-28)	3	5:00	(Note: Bellator Featherweight World Grand Prix First Round bout.)
Preliminary card
Featherweight	AJ Agazarm	def.	Jonathan Quiroz	Decision (unanimous) (29-28, 29-28, 29-28)	3	5:00
Women's Strawweight	Ava Knight	def.	Shannon Goughary	TKO (punch to the body)	3	1:46
Catchweight (165 lb)	Antonio McKee	def.	William Sriyapai	TKO (punches)	2	1:17
Catchweight (175 lb)	Johnny Cisneros	def.	Michael Jasper	TKO (ankle injury)	2	2:48
Bantamweight	Leandro Higo	def.	Shawn Bunch	Submission (guillotine choke)	2	4:34
Featherweight	Weber Almeida	def.	Castle Williams	TKO (punches)	2	0:20
Catchweight (133 lb)	James Barnes	def.	David Duran	Submission (rear-naked choke)	2	1:51
Lightweight	Joshua Jones	def.	Dominic Clark	Submission (guillotine choke)	1	2:39
Postliminary card
Bantamweight	Adrian Najera	def.	Jason Edwards	Submission (rear-naked choke)	3	2:28
Catchweight (130 lb)	Benji Gomez	def.	Jonathan Santa Maria	Decision	3	5:00
Middleweight	Osman Diaz	def.	Andre Walker	Submission (rear-naked choke)	1	3:05
Catchweight (165 lb)	Ian Butler	def.	Emilio Williams	TKO (punches)	2	0:53

== Bellator 229 ==
Bellator 229: Koreshkov vs. Larkin
- Date: October 4, 2019
- Venue: Pechanga Resort and Casino
- City: Temecula, California
- Attendance: 1,210
- Total gate: $308,722

Bellator 229: Koreshkov vs. Larkin took place on October 4, 2019 at Pechanga Resort and Casino in Temecula, California. The event took place on Paramount Network and DAZN.

Background

The event featured a welterweight bout between former Bellator Welterweight Champion Andrey Koreshkov and Lorenz Larkin.

Results

Fight card
Weight class				Method	Round	Time	Notes
Welterweight	Lorenz Larkin	def.	Andrey Koreshkov	Decision (split) (28-29, 29-28, 29-28)	3	5:00
Lightweight	Goiti Yamauchi	def.	Saad Awad	Verbal Submission (armbar)	1	1:40
Catchweight (118 lb)	Keri Taylor-Melendez	def.	Mandy Polk	Decision (unanimous) (30-27, 30-27, 30-27)	3	5:00
Middleweight	Tony Johnson	def.	Joe Schilling	KO (punch)	3	2:07
Preliminary card
Middleweight	Anatoly Tokov	def.	Hracho Darpinyan	TKO (punches)	1	4:38
Featherweight	Salim Mukhidinov	def.	Adel Altamimi	Decision (unanimous) (29-27, 30-26, 30-27)	3	5:00
Postliminary card
Featherweight	Jay Jay Wilson	def.	Jorge Juarez	Submission (rear-naked choke)	1	1:33
Lightweight	Kelvin Gentapanan	def.	Sunni Imhotep	Decision (split) (29-28, 28-29, 29-28)	3	5:00
Middleweight	Jordan Newman	def.	Riley Miller	TKO (punches)	1	4:28
Lightweight	Vladimir Tokov	def.	Brandon Hastings	Decision (unanimous) (30-26, 30-27, 30-27)	3	5:00
Middleweight	Johnny Eblen	def.	Mauricio Alonso	Decision (unanimous) (30-26, 30-27, 30-27)	3	5:00
Welterweight	Joey Davis	def.	Jeffrey Peterson	KO (flying knee)	1	1:00
Welterweight	Derek Anderson	def.	Guilherme Bomba	Decision (unanimous) (30-27, 30-27, 30-27)	3	5:00

== Bellator Milan/Bellator 230 ==
Bellator Milan/Bellator 230
- Date: October 12, 2019
- Venue: Ex Palalido (Allianz Cloud)
- City: Milan, Italy
- Attendance: 4,927
- Total gate: €398,942 (ITL) / $511,529 (USD)

Bellator Milan/Bellator 230 took place on October 12, 2019 at Ex Palalido (Allianz Cloud) in Milan, Italy.

Background

The event marked the fifth event in Bellator's European series, with the Bellator Milan portion of the card airing on Channel 5 in the UK, including the light heavyweight bout between Alessio Sakara and Canaan Grigsby.

The fights billed as Bellator 230 were shown on Paramount Network and DAZN, with the headlining bout featuring former Bellator Middleweight Champion Rafael Carvalho and Vadim Nemkov.

Bellator Kickboxing was also featured on the card.

Results

Bellator Milan card
Weight class				Method	Round	Time	Notes
Light Heavyweight	Alessio Sakara	def.	Canaan Grigsby	TKO (punches)	1	0:23
Welterweight	Stefano Paterno	def.	Ashley Reece	Decision (unanimous) (30-27, 29-27, 29-27)	3	5:00
Light Heavyweight	Melvin Manhoef	def.	Yannick Bahati	TKO (punches)	1	2:29
Lightweight	Rafael Macedo	def.	Kane Mousah	Decision (split) (30-27, 29-28, 28-29)	3	5:00
Bellator 230 card
Light Heavyweight	Vadim Nemkov	def.	Rafael Carvalho	Submission (rear-naked choke)	2	3:56
Heavyweight	Dragos Zubco	def.	Hesdy Gerges	Decision (unanimous) (29-28, 29-28, 29-28)	3	5:00
Heavyweight	Kirill Sidelnikov	def.	Domingos Barros	Decision (unanimous) (30-27, 29-28, 29-28)	3	5:00
Welterweight	Walter Pugliesi	def.	Andrea Fusi	Decision (unanimous) (30-27, 30-27, 30-27)	3	5:00
Bellator Milan Preliminary card
Lightweight	Nicolo Solli	def.	Dan Cassell	Submission (triangle choke)	1	3:15
Bellator Kickboxing 12 card
Featherweight	Gabriel Varga (c)	def.	Cristian Faustino	Decision (unanimous)	5	3:00	(Note: For the Bellator Kickboxing Featherweight Championship.)
Catchweight (158 lb)	Chingiz Allazov	def.	Sudsakorn Sor Klinmee	Decision (unanimous)	3	3:00
Catchweight (132 lb)	Luca Cecchetti	def.	Alex Avogadro	TKO (doctor stoppage)	1	2:09
Featherweight	Shan Cangelosi	def.	Kevin Ross	Decision (unanimous)	3	3:00
Catchweight (174 lb)	Yuri Bessmertny	def.	Guiseppe De Domenico	Decision (unanimous)	3	3:00
Featherweight	Enderson Bonat	vs.	Kebrom Neguse	Draw (majority)	3	3:00
Lightweight	Taras Hnatchuk	def.	Giacoma Licheri	Decision (unanimous)	3	3:00
Catchweight (140 lb)	Luca Mameli	def.	Pawel Zymansky	Decision (unanimous)	3	3:00

== Bellator 231 ==
Bellator 231: Mir vs. Nelson 2
- Date: October 25, 2019
- Venue: Mohegan Sun Arena
- City: Uncasville, Connecticut
- Attendance: 7,919
- Total gate: $857,486

Bellator 231: Mir vs. Nelson 2 took place on October 25, 2019 at Mohegan Sun Arena in Uncasville, Connecticut. The event took place on Paramount Network and DAZN.

Background

The event featured a heavyweight bout between former UFC Heavyweight Champion Frank Mir and Roy Nelson. The two previously met at UFC 130 where Mir won by unanimous decision.

Results

Fight card
Weight class				Method	Round	Time	Notes
Heavyweight	Frank Mir	def.	Roy Nelson	Decision (unanimous) (30-27, 29-28, 29-28)	3	5:00
Light Heavyweight	Phil Davis	def.	Karl Albrektsson	TKO (punches)	3	3:06
Welterweight	Ed Ruth	def.	Jason Jackson	Decision (split) (29-28, 28-29, 29-28)	3	5:00
Women's Flyweight	Ilara Joanne	def.	Bec Rawlings	Submission (kneebar)	2	3:35
Heavyweight	Jake Hager	vs.	Anthony Garrett	No Contest (accidental groin strike)	1	1:56
Preliminary card
Flyweight	Phumi Nkuta	def.	Adrian Haley	Decision (unanimous) (30-27, 30-26, 30-26)	3	5:00
Welterweight	Connor Dixon	def.	Orkhan Ismatzade	Submission (kimura)	1	0:42
Lightweight	Killys Mota	def.	Mandel Nallo	TKO (ankle injury)	3	1:16
Women's Featherweight	Jessy Miele	def.	Talita Nogueira	Decision (split) (27-30, 29-28, 30-27)	3	5:00
Heavyweight	Steve Mowry	def.	Gokhan Saricam	Submission (kimura)	2	0:56
Light Heavyweight	Dalton Rosta	def.	Claude Wilcox	TKO (punches)	2	4:23
Middleweight	Tim Caron	def.	Lucas Borges	Decision (unanimous) (29-28, 29-28, 29-28)	3	5:00
Welterweight	Jonathan Manley	def.	Thiago Oliveira	Decision (unanimous) (30-27, 29-28, 29-28)	3	5:00
Women's Atomweight	Elise Reed	def.	Rebecca Bryggman	TKO (punches)	1	4:48

== Bellator 232 ==
Bellator 232: MacDonald vs. Lima 2
- Date: October 26, 2019
- Venue: Mohegan Sun Arena
- City: Uncasville, Connecticut
- Attendance: 9,624
- Total gate: $1,192,207

Bellator 232: MacDonald vs. Lima 2 took place on October 26, 2019 at Mohegan Sun Arena in Uncasville, Connecticut. The event aired on DAZN.

Background

The event featured the finals of the Bellator Welterweight World Grand Prix for the Bellator Welterweight World Championship between the champion Rory MacDonald and former champion Douglas Lima. The two previously met at Bellator 192 where MacDonald won by unanimous decision to claim the championship.

Vitaly Minakov was expected to face Javy Ayala at the event. Eventually, Minakov pulled out due to visa issues and the bout was cancelled.

A Featherweight bout between Robin van Roosmalen and Cris Lencioni was scheduled for the main card. However, Van Roosmalen missed the featherweight limit by nine pounds and the bout was cancelled. Isaiah Chapman also came in one-quarter pound over the allotted bantamweight limit.

Results

Fight card
Weight class				Method	Round	Time	Notes
Welterweight	Douglas Lima	def.	Rory MacDonald (c)	Decision (unanimous) (49-46, 50-45, 50-45)	5	5:00	(Note: Bellator Welterweight World Grand Prix Final. For the Bellator Welterweight World Championship.)
Catchweight (175 lb)	Paul Daley	def.	Saad Awad	TKO (punches)	2	1:30
Catchweight (136.25 lb)	Patchy Mix	def.	Isaiah Chapman	Submission (Suloev stretch)	1	3:49
Lightweight	Manny Muro	def.	Nick Newell	Decision (split) (29-28, 27-29, 29-28)	3	5:00
Catchweight (160 lb)	Kevin Ferguson Jr.	vs.	Craig Campbell	No Contest (overturned)	1	0:38	(Note: Originally a TKO (punches and elbows) win for Ferguson. Over turned upon review when the elbows were deemed illegal when they landed to the back of Campbell's head.)
Preliminary card
Welterweight	Ryan Hardy Evans	def.	Demetrios Plaza	Submission (rear-naked choke)	3	3:03
Lightweight	Lance Gibson Jr.	def.	Dominic Jones	TKO (punches)	1	1:58
Lightweight	Devin Powell	def.	Marcus Surin	Technical Submission (mounted guillotine choke)	2	5:00
Flyweight	Johnny Lopez	def.	Dan Cormier	Decision (unanimous) (29-28, 30-27, 30-27)	3	5:00
Bantamweight	Jornel Lugo	def.	John Douma	Decision (unanimous) (30-26, 30-27, 30-27)	3	5:00
Flyweight	Zarrukh Adashev	def.	Tevin Dyce	TKO (punches)	2	1:39

== Bellator 233 ==
Bellator 233: Salter vs. Van Steenis
- Date: November 8, 2019
- Venue: WinStar World Casino
- City: Thackerville, Oklahoma
- Attendance: 1,165
- Total gate: $202,238

Bellator 233: Salter vs. van Steenis took place on November 8, 2019 at WinStar World Casino in Thackerville, Oklahoma. The event aired on Paramount Network and DAZN.

Background

The event featured a middleweight bout between John Salter and Costello van Steenis.

Jason Perrotta and Robert Gidron missed weight for their respective bouts.

Results

Fight card
Weight class				Method	Round	Time	Notes
Middleweight	John Salter	def.	Costello van Steenis	Decision (unanimous) (29-28, 29-28, 29-28)	3	5:00
Catchweight (195 lb)	Andrew Kapel	def.	Muhammed Lawal	KO (punches)	1	1:22
Women's Featherweight	Arlene Blencowe	def.	Leslie Smith	Decision (unanimous) (30-27, 30-27, 30-27)	3	5:00
Heavyweight	Tyrell Fortune	def.	Zu Anyanwu	TKO (punches)	2	1:56
Preliminary card
Light Heavyweight	Tyree Fortune	def.	Chuck Campbell	Decision (split) (29-28, 28-29, 29-28)	3	5:00
Catchweight (175 lb)	Logan Storley	def.	E. J. Brooks	TKO (doctor stoppage)	1	5:00
Light Heavyweight	Julius Anglickas	def.	Jordan Young	Decision (unanimous) (30-27, 30-27, 30-27)	3	5:00
Women's Featherweight	Amanda Bell	def.	Janay Harding	TKO (punches)	3	4:44
Welterweight	Kyle Crutchmer	def.	Robert Gidron	Decision (unanimous) (30-27, 30-27, 30-27)	3	5:00
Middleweight	Romero Cotton	def.	Jason Perrotta	Verbal submission (injury)	1	2:16
Light Heavyweight	Christian Edwards	def.	Cesar Bennett	KO (head kick)	1	0:16
Light Heavyweight	Grant Neal	def.	Jimmy Lugo	Decision (unanimous) (30-26, 29-28, 30-26)	3	5:00
Postliminary card
Lightweight	Aaron McKenzie	def.	Sean Clements	Submission (rear-naked choke)	2	4:31
Featherweight	Lucas Brennan	def.	Jacob Landin	Submission (rear-naked choke)	1	3:38

== Bellator 234 ==
Bellator 234: Kharitonov vs. Vassell
- Date: November 14, 2019
- Venue: Menora Mivtachim Arena
- City: Tel Aviv, Israel
- Attendance: 10,793
- Total gate: ₪3,626,040 (ILS) / $1,044,291 (USD)

Bellator 234: Kharitonov vs. Vassell took place on November 14, 2019 at Menora Mivtachim Arena in Tel Aviv, Israel. The event will air on November 15 via tape delay on Paramount Network and DAZN.

Background

The event featured a heavyweight bout between Sergei Kharitonov and Linton Vassell.

Results

Main card
Weight class				Method	Round	Time	Notes
Heavyweight	Linton Vassell	def.	Sergei Kharitonov	TKO (punches)	2	3:15
Lightweight	Sidney Outlaw	def.	Roger Huerta	Decision (unanimous) (30-27, 30-27, 29-28)	3	5:00
Lightweight	Aviv Gozali	def.	Zaka Fatullazade	Submission (anaconda choke)	1	0:56
Welterweight	Haim Gozali	def.	Artur Pronin	Submission (heel hook)	1	4:12
Middleweight	Austin Vanderford	def.	Grachik Bozinyan	Decision (unanimous) (29-28, 29-28, 29-28)	3	5:00
Preliminary card
Women's Featherweight	Sinead Kavanagh	def.	Olga Rubin	TKO (punches)	2	4:37
Catchweight (173.4 lb)	Robson Gracie Jr.	def.	Ameer Basheer	Submission (triangle choke)	1	4:39
Heavyweight	Adam Keresh	def.	Vladimir Fedin	KO (head kick, knee, and punches)	1	3:29
Welterweight	Simon Smotritsky	def.	Illia Hladkii	TKO (punches)	1	2:10
Catchweight (158.8 lb)	Vuqar Keramov	def.	Gustavo Wurlitzer	KO (punches)	1	1:29
Catchweight (157 lb)	Kirill Medvedovsky	def.	Akhmed Fararzha	Submission (guillotine choke)	2	0:46
Bantamweight	Raz Bring	def.	Naziri Daniliuk	Decision (unanimous)	3	5:00
Lightweight	Mikail Dulgher	def.	Ofir Leibel	Decision (unanimous)	3	5:00
Bantamweight	Ron Becker	def.	Artem Kazartsev	TKO (punches)	1	2:57
Bantamweight	Ben Cohen	def.	Maksym Tkachuk	Submission (rear-naked choke)	1	3:17
Light Heavyweight	Eli Aronov	def.	Sari Hleihil	Decision (split) (30-26, 27-28, 30-26)	3	5:00
Flyweight	Itay Lipszyc	def.	Itzik Vakobov	Submission (heel hook)	1	2:52
Catchweight (220 lb)	Noam Voldman	def.	Nisim Rozalis	Decision (split)	3	5:00
Featherweight	Itay Tratner	vs.	Elias Mamadov	Draw (split)	3	5:00
Welterweight	Maslis Tomer	def.	David Malka	TKO	3	1:32

== Bellator London 2 ==
Bellator London
- Date: November 23, 2019
- Venue: The SSE Arena
- City: London, England
- Attendance: 11,746
- Total gate: £845,934 (GBP) / $1,086,976 (USD)

Bellator London: MVP vs. Melillo was an event for Bellator MMA that took place on November 23, 2019 at The SSE Arena in London, England.

Background

The event was the sixth event of the Bellator European Series and second of 2019 in London. The event was to be headlined by a welterweight bout between Michael Page and Derek Anderson. However, on November 12, it was announced Anderson had pulled out of the bout due to an undisclosed injury. Page instead fought Gianni Melillo.

Results

Fight card
Weight class				Method	Round	Time	Notes
Welterweight	Michael Page	def.	Gianni Melillo	KO (punch)	1	1:47
Middleweight	Fabian Edwards	def.	Michael Shipman	Decision (split) (28-29, 29-28, 30-27)	3	5:00
Lightweight	Soren Bak	def.	Terry Brazier	Decision (unanimous) (30-27, 30-27, 29-28)	3	5:00
Preliminary card
Women's Flyweight	Denise Kielholtz	def.	Sabriye Şengül	Submission (armericana)	1	0:32
Lightweight	Tim Wilde	def.	Charlie Leary	Decision (unanimous) (29-28, 29-28, 29-28)	3	5:00
Middleweight	Pietro Penini	def.	Charlie Ward	Decision (unanimous) (30-27, 30-27, 29-28)	3	5:00
Featherweight	Robert Whiteford	def.	Sam Sicilia	KO (punches)	3	4:54
Welterweight	Lewis Long	def.	Walter Gahadza	Submission (rear-naked choke)	1	1:44
Lightweight	Chris Bungard	def.	Benjamin Brander	Submission (rear-naked choke)	1	1:26
Middleweight	Kent Kauppinen	def.	Andy Manzolo	Submission (forearm choke)	1	3:53
Catchweight (161 lb)	Alfie Davis	def.	Alessandro Botti	Decision (unanimous) (30-27, 30-27, 29-28)	3	5:00
Middleweight	Kevin Fryer	def.	Tuco Tokkos	Decision (unanimous) (30-27, 30-27, 30-27)	3	5:00
Featherweight	Aiden Lee	def.	Damian Frankiewicz	Submission (rear-naked choke)	3	1:24
Catchweight (150 lb)	Jeremy Petley	def.	Tommy Mearns	Decision (unanimous) (29-28, 29-28, 29-28)	3	5:00
Featherweight	Harry Hardwick	def.	Nathan Rose	Decision (majority) (29-28, 29-28, 28-28)	3	5:00
Lightweight	Akonne Wanliss	def.	Tim Barnett	Technical Submission (D'Arce choke)	1	0:56
Welterweight	Raphael Uchegbu	def.	Shane Campbell	Submission (rear-naked choke)	3	2:17
Women's Featherweight	Charlotte McIntyre	def.	Josie Blaber	TKO (punches)	2	2:00

== Bellator 235 ==
Bellator 235: Misech vs. Perez
- Date: December 20, 2019
- Venue: Neal S. Blaisdell Arena
- City: Honolulu, Hawaii
- Attendance: 7,213
- Total gate: $803,430

Bellator USO Salute to the Troops: Misech vs. Perez was an event for Bellator MMA that took place on December 20, 2019 at Neal S. Blaisdell Arena in Honolulu, Hawaii. The event took place on Paramount Network and DAZN.

Background

The event was expected to feature a heavyweight bout between the former UFC Heavyweight Champion Josh Barnett and UFC veteran Ronny Markes. However, the bout was cancelled after Barnett was pulled due to illness just moments before the fight was scheduled to take place. The originally scheduled bantamweight bout between Toby Miesch and Erik Pérez was bumped to the main event.

Results

Main card
Weight class				Method	Round	Time	Notes
Catchweight (141.4 lb)	Toby Misech	def.	Erik Pérez	KO (punches)	1	0:54
Catchweight (126.8 lb)	Alejandra Lara	def.	Veta Arteaga	Decision (unanimous) (30-26, 30-26, 30-26)	3	5:00
Featherweight	Tywan Claxton	def.	Braydon Akeo	Decision (unanimous) (30-27, 30-27, 30-27)	3	5:00
Welterweight	Joey Davis	def.	Chris Cisneros	TKO (punches)	1	3:55
Preliminary card
Catchweight (180 lb)	Hunter Eweld	def.	Brysen Bolohao	Submission (rear-naked choke)	1	1:42
Middleweight	Joseph Creer	def.	Ty Gwerder	Decision (unanimous) (30-27, 30-27, 29-26	3	5:00
Bantamweight	Cass Bell	def.	Pierre Daguzan	Decision (unanimous) (30-27, 29-28, 30-27)	3	5:00

== Bellator 236 ==
Bellator 236: Macfarlane vs. Jackson
- Date: December 21, 2019
- Venue: Neal S. Blaisdell Arena
- City: Honolulu, Hawaii
- Attendance: 8,293
- Total gate: $973,343

Bellator 236: Macfarlane vs. Jackson was an event for Bellator MMA that took place on December 21, 2019 at Neal S. Blaisdell Arena in Honolulu, Hawaii. The event streamed on DAZN.

Background

The event featured a Bellator Women's Flyweight World Championship bout between the champion Ilima-Lei Macfarlane and Kate Jackson.

Neiman Gracie was expected to face Kiichi Kunimoto at the event. Gracie pulled out a few days before the event due to injury. Kunimoto instead fought Jason Jackson.

Results

Main card
Weight class				Method	Round	Time	Notes
Women's Flyweight	Ilima-Lei Macfarlane (c)	def.	Kate Jackson	Decision (unanimous) (50-45, 50-44, 50-44)	5	5:00	(Note: For the Bellator Women's Flyweight World Championship.)
Featherweight	A.J. McKee	def.	Derek Campos	Submission (armbar)	3	1:08	(Note: Bellator Featherweight World Grand Prix Quarter-Final Round bout.)
Welterweight	Jason Jackson	def.	Kiichi Kunimoto	Decision (unanimous) (30-27 30-27, 30-27)	3	5:00
Women's Flyweight	Juliana Velasquez	def.	Bruna Ellen	Decision (unanimous) (30-27, 30-27, 30-26)	3	5:00
Bantamweight	Raufeon Stots	def.	Cheyden Leialoha	Decision (unanimous) (29-28, 30-27, 29-28)	3	5:00
Lightweight	Zachary Zane	def.	Nainoa Dung	Decision (unanimous) (29-28, 29-28, 29-28)	3	5:00
Preliminary card
Catchweight (142.8 lb)	Swayne Lunasco	def.	Kaylan Gorospe	TKO (punches)	3	3:29
Welterweight	Benjamin Wilhelm	def.	Keali'i Kanekoa	Submission (rear-naked choke)	1	2:24
Lightweight	Dustin Barca	def.	Brandon Pieper	Submission (rear-naked choke)	1	0:58
Featherweight	Kai Kamaka III	def.	Spencer Higa	Decision (unanimous) (30-27 30-27, 30-27)	3	5:00
Lightweight	Keoni Diggs	def.	Scotty Hao	Technical Submission (rear-naked choke)	2	2:23
Postliminary card
Flyweight	Chas Dunhour	def.	Nate Yoshimura	KO (elbow and punches)	2	2:46

== Bellator 237 ==
Bellator 237: Fedor vs. Rampage
- Date: December 29, 2019
- Venue: Saitama Super Arena
- City: Saitama, Japan
- Attendance: 26,080
- Total gate: ¥684,363,859 (JPY) / $6,294,448 (USD)

Bellator Japan (also known as Bellator 237: Fedor vs. Rampage) was an event for Bellator MMA that took place on December 29, 2019 at Saitama Super Arena in Saitama, Japan. The event aired live on Paramount Network and DAZN in the United States.

Background

The event was announced by Bellator on October 9, 2019 as the company's debut in Japan. The event marked Bellator's first collaboration with the Japanese Rizin Fighting Federation; the preliminary matches featured Rizin fighters. The event was headlined by a heavyweight bout between former Pride FC Heavyweight Champion Fedor Emelianenko and former UFC Light Heavyweight Champion Quinton Jackson.

A 160 pound catchweight bout between former Bellator Lightweight Champion Michael Chandler and former WEC and UFC Lightweight Champion Benson Henderson was expected to take place at the event. It was to have been a rematch from Bellator 165 where Chandler won by split decision over Henderson to remain the lightweight champion. However, Henderson pulled out on December 5 due to injury. Chandler instead faced Sidney Outlaw.

Results

Bellator 237 Card
Weight class				Method	Round	Time	Notes
Heavyweight	Fedor Emelianenko	def.	Quinton Jackson	TKO (punches)	1	2:44
Catchweight (160 lb)	Michael Chandler	def.	Sidney Outlaw	KO (punches)	1	2:59
Catchweight (175 lb)	Michael Page	def.	Shinsho Anzai	KO (punch)	2	0:23
Catchweight (175 lb)	Lorenz Larkin	def.	Keita Nakamura	Decision (unanimous) (30–27, 30–26, 30–26)	3	5:00	(Note: Larkin missed weight and was fined 20% of his purse.)
Women's Flyweight	Kana Watanabe	def.	Ilara Joanne	TKO (punches)	3	4:39
Lightweight	Goiti Yamauchi	def.	Daron Cruickshank	Submission (rear-naked choke)	1	3:11	(Note: Yamauchi missed weight and was fined 20% of his purse.)
Bellator Prelims Powered by Rizin
RIZIN Lightweight	Yusuke Yachi	def.	Hiroto Uesako	KO (soccer kick)	3	4:36
RIZIN Super Atomweight	Kanna Asakura	def.	Jayme Hinshaw	Submission (kimura)	3	3:33
RIZIN Strawweight	Jarred Brooks	def.	Haruo Ochi	Decision (unanimous)	3	5:00
RIZIN Super Flyweight (Kickboxing)	Ren Hiramoto	def.	Takahiro Ashida	TKO (punches)	1	4:49
RIZIN Super Flyweight	Makoto Takahashi	def.	Yusaku Nakamura	Decision (unanimous)	3	5:00
RIZIN Women's Strawweight	Ai Shimizu	def.	Andy Nguyen	Decision (split)	3	5:00
RIZIN Welterweight	Jon Tuck	def.	Ryuichiro Sumimura	KO (punch)	1	3:45
RIZIN Heavyweight	Shoma Shibisai	def.	Sergey Shemetov	Submission (achilles lock)	1	0:45
