= Daniel Weichel =

German martial artist

- Born: November 22, 1984 (age 41); Michelstadt, West Germany
- Other names: The Weasel; Drake
- Nationality: German
- Height: 5 ft 10 in (1.78 m)
- Weight: 145 lb (66 kg; 10.4 st)
- Division: Featherweight; Lightweight
- Reach: 71 in (180 cm)
- Fighting out of: Frankfurt am Main, Germany
- Team: Team MMA Spirit
- Rank: Black belt in Brazilian Jiu-Jitsu under Din Thomas
- Years active: 2002–present

Mixed martial arts record
- Total: 58
- Wins: 43
- By knockout: 6
- By submission: 22
- By decision: 15
- Losses: 15
- By knockout: 5
- By submission: 3
- By decision: 7

Other information
- Mixed martial arts record from Sherdog

Daniel Weichel (born November 22, 1984) is a German professional mixed martial artist who currently competes in the Lightweight division of the Oktagon MMA. He previously competed in Bellator MMA, M-1 Global and Shooto.

== Background ==
Born and raised in Germany, Weichel originally began training in Jujutsu at the age of 14, before transitioning into Brazilian jiu-jitsu a year later. Weichel also began training in Muay Thai and then wrestling when he was 17, with both freestyle wrestling and Greco-Roman wrestling, as well as boxing. In 2014 Daniel received his blackbelt in Brazilian jiu-jitsu by Din Thomas.

== Mixed martial arts career ==
=== Early career ===
Weichel made his professional MMA debut in May 2002. Over the next four and a half years of his career, he amassed a record of 15–2.

During this time, Weichel competed on a German mixed martial arts reality show titled M.A.X. (Martial Arts Xtreme) in 2006, where he made it to the final against Ivan Mussardo. However, the production shut down before the match could actually take place. The two did eventually meet in 2009, where Weichel won by unanimous decision.

=== M-1 Global ===
Following a rough patch where he went 3-4 (including two losses to future UFC fighters Paul Daley and Dan Hardy), Weichel joined the Russian MMA organization M-1 Global, going 5–0 on their M-1 Challengers series.

Weichel eventually challenged for the M-1 Global Lightweight Championship as he faced Jose Figueroa in November 2011 at M-1 Global: Fedor vs. Monson. He won the bout and title via knockout in the first round.

Weichel's reign as champion would be short lived though. He lost the belt in his first defense in June 2012 against Musa Khamanaev at M-1 Global: Fedor vs. Rizzo. He lost the bout via submission in the first round.

=== Bellator MMA ===
In September 2013, it was announced that Weichel had signed a contract with Bellator MMA and would compete in their Season Ten Featherweight Tournament.

Weichel made his Bellator debut in the Season Ten Featherweight Tournament Quarterfinal facing Scott Cleve at Bellator 110 on February 28, 2014 he won via submission with a rear-naked choke.

Weichel fought against Matt Bessette at Bellator 114 on March 28, 2014 in the Featherweight tournament semifinals. He won the bout via unanimous decision.

Weichel faced Desmond Green in the Tournament Final at Bellator 119 on May 9, 2014. He won the fight via submission in the second round. He also became the final tournament winner as Bellator moves away from tournament era.

Weichel faced Pat Curran on February 13, 2015 at Bellator 133. He won the fight via split decision.

Replacing an injured Georgi Karakhanyan, Weichel faced Bellator Featherweight Champion Patrício Freire at Bellator 138 on June 19, 2015. Despite dropping Freire with a series of strikes the waning seconds of the first round, Weichel lost the fight via knockout when Freire rallied with a counter left hook early in the second round.

Weichel faced Georgi Karakhanyan at Bellator 147 on December 4, 2015. He won by unanimous decision.

Weichel next faced up-and-comer Emmanuel Sanchez at Bellator 159 on July 22, 2016. He won via split decision.

Weichel faced Brian Moore at Bellator 169 on December 16, 2016. He won the fight via submission in the first round.

Weichel faced John Teixeira at Bellator 177 on April 14, 2017. He won via split decision.

After four consecutive victories, Weichel was expected to face newly crowned featherweight champion, Patrício Freire, in a second fight at Bellator 188 on November 16, 2017. However, Freire pulled out of the fight due to multiple injuries. Weichel eventually faced Patricio Freire in a rematch in the main event at Bellator 203 on July 14, 2018. He lost the back-and-forth fight via split decision.

After the title fight, Weichel faced Goiti Yamauchi at Bellator 210 on November 30, 2018. He lost the close fight via split decision.

As the opening round fight of the Bellator Featherweight World Grand Prix First Round, Weichel faced Saul Rogers at Bellator 228 on September 28, 2019. Weichel won the fight via unanimous decision as he rocked Rogers late in the opening round.

In the quarterfinals, Weichel was initially expected to face Emmanuel Sanchez in a rematch in February 2020. However, the date got pushed back and they were next expected to face at Bellator 241 on March 13, 2020. However, the whole event was eventually cancelled due to the prevailing COVID-19 pandemic. The bout was rescheduled and took place at Bellator 252 on November 12. Weichel lost the bout via unanimous decision.

Weichel faced Keoni Diggs on June 25, 2021 at Bellator 261. He won the close bout via split decision.

Weichel faced Pedro Carvalho at Bellator 270 on November 5, 2021. He lost the bout via unanimous decision.

Weichel faced Rob Whiteford on May 13, 2022 at Bellator 281. He won the bout via TKO stoppage in the first round.

Weichel was set to face Akhmed Magomedov at Bellator 288 on November 18, 2022. However, Magomedov pulled out due to unknown reason and was replaced by Timur Khizriev. Weichel lost the bout via unanimous decision.

Weichel faced Mads Burnell on September 23, 2023 at Bellator 299. He lost the fight via unanimous decision. After the bout, Weichel retired from mixed martial arts competition.

=== Oktagon MMA ===
Returning from retirement, Weichel faced Aboubakar Tounkara in the main event on September 20, 2025, at Oktagon 76. He won the fight via unanimous decision.

== Championships and accomplishments ==
- Bellator MMA
  - Bellator Season Ten Featherweight Tournament Winner
- M-1 Global
  - M-1 Global Lightweight Championship (One time)

== Mixed martial arts record ==
Professional record breakdown
58 matches	43 wins	15 losses
By knockout	6	5
By submission	22	3
By decision	15	7

Res.	Record	Opponent	Method	Event	Date	Round	Time	Location	Notes
Win	43–15	Aboubakar Tounkara	Decision (unanimous)	Oktagon 76	September 20, 2025	3	5:00	Frankfurt, Germany	Return to Lightweight.
Loss	42–15	Mads Burnell	Decision (unanimous)	Bellator 299	September 23, 2023	3	5:00	Dublin, Ireland	
Loss	42–14	Timur Khizriev	Decision (unanimous)	Bellator 288	November 18, 2022	3	5:00	Chicago, Illinois, United States	
Win	42–13	Rob Whiteford	TKO (punches)	Bellator 281	May 13, 2022	1	1:12	London, England	
Loss	41–13	Pedro Carvalho	Decision (unanimous)	Bellator 270	November 5, 2021	3	5:00	Dublin, Ireland	
Win	41–12	Keoni Diggs	Decision (split)	Bellator 261	June 25, 2021	3	5:00	Uncasville, Connecticut, United States	
Loss	40–12	Emmanuel Sanchez	Decision (unanimous)	Bellator 252	November 12, 2020	5	5:00	Uncasville, Connecticut, United States	Bellator Featherweight World Grand Prix Quarterfinal.
Win	40–11	Saul Rogers	Decision (unanimous)	Bellator 228	September 28, 2019	3	5:00	Inglewood, California, United States	Bellator Featherweight World Grand Prix Opening Round.
Loss	39–11	Goiti Yamauchi	Decision (split)	Bellator 210	November 30, 2018	3	5:00	Thackerville, Oklahoma, United States	Lightweight bout.
Loss	39–10	Patrício Pitbull	Decision (split)	Bellator 203	July 14, 2018	5	5:00	Rome, Italy	For the Bellator Featherweight World Championship.
Win	39–9	John Macapá	Decision (split)	Bellator 177	April 14, 2017	3	5:00	Budapest, Hungary	
Win	38–9	Brian Moore	Submission (arm-triangle choke)	Bellator 169	December 16, 2016	1	4:44	Dublin, Ireland	
Win	37–9	Emmanuel Sanchez	Decision (split)	Bellator 159	July 22, 2016	3	5:00	Mulvane, Kansas, United States	
Win	36–9	Georgi Karakhanyan	Decision (unanimous)	Bellator 147	December 4, 2015	3	5:00	San Jose, California, United States	
Loss	35–9	Patrício Pitbull	KO (punch)	Bellator 138	June 19, 2015	2	0:32	St. Louis, Missouri, United States	For the Bellator Featherweight World Championship.
Win	35–8	Pat Curran	Decision (split)	Bellator 133	February 13, 2015	3	5:00	Fresno, California, United States	
Win	34–8	Desmond Green	Submission (rear-naked choke)	Bellator 119	May 9, 2014	2	2:07	Rama, Ontario, Canada	Won the Bellator Season Ten Featherweight Tournament
Win	33–8	Matt Bessette	Decision (unanimous)	Bellator 114	March 28, 2014	3	5:00	West Valley City, Utah, United States	Bellator Season Ten Featherweight Tournament Semifinal.
Win	32–8	Scott Cleve	Submission (rear-naked choke)	Bellator 110	February 28, 2014	1	3:46	Uncasville, Connecticut, United States	Return to Featherweight. Bellator Season Ten Featherweight Tournament Quarterfinal.
Win	31–8	Artiom Damkovsky	Submission (arm-triangle choke)	M-1 Challenge 37	February 27, 2013	2	4:24	Orenburg, Russia	
Win	30–8	Georgi Stoyanov	Submission (rear-naked choke)	M-1 Challenge 36	December 8, 2012	2	2:24	Mytishchi, Russia	
Win	29–8	Semen Tyrlya	Submission (rear-naked choke)	Respect FC 8	September 22, 2012	1	3:40	Wuppertal, Germany	
Loss	28–8	Musa Khamanaev	Submission (heel hook)	M-1 Global: Fedor vs. Rizzo	June 21, 2012	1	1:48	Saint Petersburg, Russia	Lost the M-1 Global Lightweight Championship.
Win	28–7	Jose Figueroa	KO (punches)	M-1 Global: Fedor vs. Monson	November 20, 2011	1	1:50	Moscow, Russia,	Won the M-1 Global Lightweight Championship.
Win	27–7	Beau Baker	Decision (unanimous)	M-1 Challenge 26	July 8, 2011	3	5:00	Costa Mesa, California, United States	
Win	26–7	Magomedrasul Khasbulaev	Technical Submission (triangle choke)	M-1 Challenge 23	March 5, 2011	1	3:26	Moscow, Russia	
Win	25–7	Yuri Ivlev	TKO (doctor stoppage)	M-1 Challenge 21	October 28, 2010	3	2:24	Saint Petersburg, Russia	
Win	24–7	Avtandil Shoshiashvili	Submission (rear-naked choke)	Fight Night Merseburg 3	August 29, 2010	1	4:20	Spergau, Germany	
Loss	23–7	Rob Sinclair	TKO (punches)	BAMMA 3	May 15, 2010	1	4:03	Birmingham, England	
Win	23–6	Victor Kuku	Submission (rear-naked choke)	Tempel Fight School: Mix Fight Gala 9	December 5, 2009	1	2:57	Darmstadt, Germany	
Win	22–6	Ivan Musardo	Decision (unanimous)	Shooto: Switzerland 6	September 19, 2009	3	5:00	Zürich, Switzerland	
Win	21–6	Danial Sharifi	Submission (guillotine choke)	M-1 Challenge 18	August 15, 2009	1	2:53	Hilversum, Netherlands	Return to Lightweight.
Win	20–6	Jimmy Sidoni	TKO (punches)	Tempel Fight School: Mix Fight Gala 8	May 9, 2009	1	2:32	Darmstadt, Germany	
Win	19–6	Fatih Dogan	Submission (brabo choke)	M-1 Challenge 13	March 28, 2009	1	2:29	Bourgas, Bulgaria	
Loss	18–6	Peter Irving	Submission (rear-naked choke)	Strike and Submit 8	October 26, 2008	2	1:47	Gateshead, England	
Loss	18–5	Dan Hardy	TKO (elbows)	Ultimate Force: Punishment	May 3, 2008	2	N/A	Doncaster, England	Return to Welterweight.
Win	18–4	Ian Jones	Submission (armbar)	Gorilla Fight 2	April 5, 2008	1	2:38	Mannheim, Germany	
Loss	17–4	Jason Jones	TKO (punch and knee)	M-1 Challenge 1	March 2, 2008	1	0:06	Almere, Netherlands	Middleweight debut.
Win	17–3	Chas Jacquier	Submission (choke)	Tempel Fight School: Mix Fight Gala 6	November 25, 2007	1	N/A	Darmstadt, Germany	
Win	16–3	Fatih Balci	Submission (triangle choke)	Stapel Fighting Challenge 1	April 29, 2007	1	N/A	Stapel, Germany	
Loss	15–3	Paul Daley	KO (knee)	FX3: Fight Night 4	March 10, 2007	1	2:55	Reading, England	
Win	15–2	Amir Lekaj	Submission (kimura)	Martial Arts Xtreme 8	November 25, 2006	1	N/A	Berlin, Germany	
Win	14–2	Marcelo Lopez	Decision (split)	Martial Arts Xtreme 6	November 11, 2006	3	3:00	Berlin, Germany	
Win	13–2	Hugo Blatter	Submission (rear-naked choke)	Martial Arts Xtreme 4	October 28, 2006	1	2:47	Berlin, Germany	
Win	12–2	Josenildo Ramalho	Decision (majority)	Cage Warriors 23	May 27, 2006	3	5:00	Coventry, England	
Win	11–2	Dennis Siver	Submission (rear-naked choke)	Tempel Fight School: Mix Fight Gala 3	May 6, 2006	1	N/A	Darmstadt, Germany	
Loss	10–2	Thiago Tavares	Submission (guillotine choke)	Cage Warriors 20	March 5, 2006	3	4:47	Liverpool, England	
Win	10–1	Johan Antonsson	Submission (rear-naked choke)	European Vale Tudo 5	October 8, 2005	1	3:41	Stockholm, Sweden	
Win	9–1	Boris Jonstomp	Submission (rear-naked choke)	European Vale Tudo 5	October 8, 2005	2	2:12	Stockholm, Sweden	
Win	8–1	Mike Lucero	Submission (guillotine choke)	KOTC: Grudge Match	June 17, 2005	1	3:41	Albuquerque, New Mexico, United States	Featherweight bout.
Win	7–1	Joakim Engberg	Decision (unanimous)	European Vale Tudo 4	September 17, 2004	3	5:00	Stockholm, Sweden	Lightweight bout.
Win	6–1	Abdul Mohammed	Decision (unanimous)	Pride and Glory 3	August 7, 2004	3	5:00	Newcastle, England	
Win	5–1	Gaz Roriston	Submission (keylock)	European Vale Tudo 3	May 22, 2004	2	1:57	Copenhagen, Denmark	Welterweight debut.
Loss	4–1	Mattias Awad	Decision (unanimous)	European Vale Tudo 2	April 4, 2004	3	5:00	Stockholm, Sweden	
Win	4–0	Malte Janssen	KO (head kick)	Outsider Cup 2	February 28, 2004	2	0:13	Lübbecke, Germany	Lightweight debut.
Win	3–0	Masaya Takita	Decision (unanimous)	Shooto: 11/25 in Kitazawa Town Hall	November 25, 2003	2	5:00	Tokyo, Japan	
Win	2–0	Eduardo Guimarães	KO (flying knee)	Shooto Holland: Holland vs. the World	April 12, 2003	1	2:50	Culemborg, Netherlands	
Win	1–0	Vincent Latoel	Submission (armbar)	Shooto Holland: The Lords of the Ring	May 12, 2002	1	1:48	Deventer, Netherlands	Featherweight debut.

== See also ==
- List of current Oktagon MMA fighters
- List of male mixed martial artists
