= Pat Curran (fighter) =

American mixed martial arts fighter

- Born: August 31, 1987 (age 39)
- Other names: Paddy Mike
- Nationality: American
- Height: 5 ft 9 in (175 cm)
- Weight: 145 lb (66 kg; 10.4 st)
- Division: Lightweight, Featherweight
- Reach: 73 in (185 cm)
- Fighting out of: Crystal Lake, Illinois, United States
- Team: Team Curran
- Years active: 2008–2020

Mixed martial arts record
- Total: 32
- Wins: 23
- By knockout: 5
- By submission: 7
- By decision: 11
- Losses: 9
- By knockout: 1
- By submission: 1
- By decision: 7

Other information
- Notable relatives: Jeff Curran, cousin
- Mixed martial arts record from Sherdog

Pat Curran (born August 31, 1987) is a retired American mixed martial artist, and a former two-time Bellator Featherweight World Champion. He is the cousin of World Extreme Cagefighting veteran Jeff Curran and fought primarily with Xtreme Fighting Organization (XFO) before signing with Bellator, where he is the winner of Bellator Season Two Lightweight Tournament and the Bellator 2011 Summer Series. From July 2011 till April 2014 and January 2018 till July 2018, Curran was ranked in the top #10 Featherweights in the world by Fight Matrix, rising to as high as #2 from July 2012 till April 2013.

== Background ==
Curran went to Olympic Heights Community High School where he was a standout wrestler.

== Mixed martial arts career ==
Curran spent much of his youth crafting his skills on the playground with boxing gloves. Curran was a Florida High School wrestling stand-out who went on to study Brazilian jiu-jitsu with his cousin Jeff Curran at the young age of 17. It was during this summer of training that Curran decided to pursue mixed martial arts as a career. Curran made his debut in 2008, against Tony Hervey, a future King of the Cage Lightweight Champion. Curran won the bout. Curran had his second professional bout against Lazar Stojadinovic, who previously had a dominating performance over Curran's teammate Ben Miller. The bout was featured on the Tapout reality series on the Versus Channel, giving Curran his first mainstream performance.

=== TapouT ===
Curran was featured on the Tapout reality series on the TV channel Versus. Curran trains under his cousin, former WEC Featherweight title challenger Jeff Curran at his gym in Crystal Lake, Illinois. On the show, between training sessions, Pat got his first tattoo and he, Jeff and the crew did an autograph session at a Chicago clothing store. At the official weigh-in, Pat gets his first look at his opponent, Lazar Stojadinovic. Lazar has fought another of Jeff's students, so Pat reviews footage of that fight. The fighters were scheduled to meet at XFO 23 in Crystal Lake. Pat went on to dominate much of the first round with his grappling and ground and pound. He similarly dominated rounds two and three and won a unanimous decision from the judges.

=== Post-TapouT ===
Curran returned to the XFO for his third professional fight, where he defeated Amir Khillah by Decision (Split). His next two fights took place outside of the XFO banner, where he went 1-1 (the loss coming at the hands of UFC competitor Darren Elkins), before returning to XFO to defeat Daniel Mason-Straus by KO (Punches) in the second. After winning another with XFO, he lost again competing outside of the promotion, this time to Charles Diaz by Decision (Split).

Once again, returning to XFO, Curran next faced Luke Gwaltney, winning by TKO in the first. On October 10, 2009 he faced Jay Ellis in an XFO event, where he defeated his opponent in under a minute, submitting him with a Guillotine Choke.

He was defeated in his next fight with XFO, at the hands of Travis Perzynski, losing by rear naked choke in the second round.

Curran took part in a Trojan MMA event, where he defeated former Cage Rage British Lightweight Championship contender Robbie Olivier on February 27, 2010 via unanimous decision.

=== Bellator MMA ===
It was announced that Curran would be a participant in the Bellator Season Two Lightweight Tournament. His first round match-up was announced to be UFC Welterweight Champion Georges St-Pierre's protégé, Mike Ricci and the fight took place at Bellator 14. A crowd favorite, the Chicago-area fighter remained patient through a few strategic minutes in which the fighters traded low kicks and jabs while finding their range. However, a little more than midway through the round, Curran connected on a powerful right hook that sent opponent Mike Ricci crashing to the mat where he stayed unconscious for a few uncomfortable minutes after a few follow up punches. The bout was called, and Curran won by knockout by 3:01 in the first round.

His second bout took place at Bellator 17 against former UFC veteran Roger Huerta. Huerta was heavily favored going in to the fight, but Curran impressed over three rounds and went home with a unanimous decision, winning 29-28 on all three judges scorecards. With that victory, Curran moved on to face Toby Imada, who was also victorious that night, in the Season 2 Lightweight Tournament Final.

At Bellator 21 Curran defeated Imada via split decision in a close fight, becoming the Bellator Season Two Lightweight Tournament Champion.

A match-up against Bellator Season One Champion Eddie Alvarez was anticipated for Season Three, but Curran was forced out of the contest due to a shoulder injury. Fighting in his place, Roger Huerta took on Alvarez in a non-title bout at Bellator 33 and lost via TKO due to a doctor stoppage. Curran's bout with Alvarez took place on April 2, 2011 at Bellator 39. He lost the fight via unanimous decision, with the judges scoring it 49-46, 50-45 and 50-45 in favor of Alvarez.

Curran dropped to his original fight weight of 145 lbs to enter the Bellator 2011 Summer Series Featherweight Tournament. In his quarterfinal bout Curran submitted Luis Palomino via Peruvian necktie in the first round.

Curran faced Ronnie Mann in the Featherweight Tournament Semifinal at Bellator 47. He won the fight via unanimous decision, advancing him to the Bellator Featherweight Tournament Finals.

Curran faced former Sengoku Featherweight Champion and Pancrase Featherweight Champion Marlon Sandro at Bellator 48 for the Bellator Featherweight Tournament Final. Curran defeated Sandro four minutes into the second round via a highlight reel head-kick KO, in the process becoming the first person to win Bellator tournaments in two different weight classes.

Curran faced Joe Warren at Bellator 60. Curran defeated Warren by a brutal KO in round three to win the Bellator Featherweight Championship.

In his first title defense, Curran faced Patricio Freire at Bellator 85 on January 17, 2013. He successfully defended his title for the first time, winning the fight via split decision.

Curran was expected to defend his title against Bellator Season Six Featherweight Tournament winner, Daniel Mason-Straus, at Bellator 95. However, Straus broke his hand and was forced out of the bout. Straus was replaced by Bellator Season Seven Featherweight Tournament winner, Shahbulat Shamhalaev. Curran was successful in his second title defense, defeating Shamalaev via first-round submission.

Curran put his Bellator Featherweight Championship on the line on November 2, 2013 at Bellator 106 in a rematch against Daniel Mason-Straus. He was unsuccessful with his third title defense, losing the fight by unanimous decision.

Curran fought current champ Daniel Mason-Straus for the third time at Bellator 112 in March. An instant rematch drew criticism for Bellator from MMA pundits and fans, as many felt that Curran, who had previously lost his last match to Straus and not won a tournament for a rematch, had not done enough to earn a title shot over waiting tournament winners Patricio Freire and Magomedrasul Khasbulaev. He won the bout via rear-naked choke submission in the fifth round thus, ending their trilogy and winning the Bellator Featherweight Championship for the second time.

Curran was scheduled to make the first defense of his new title in a rematch with Patricio Freire on June 6, 2014 at Bellator 121. However, on May 21, it was announced that Curran had pulled out of the bout due to a calf injury. The rematch eventually took place at Bellator 123 on September 5, 2014. Curran lost the bout to Freire by unanimous decision.

Curran faced Daniel Weichel on February 13, 2015 at Bellator 133. He lost the fight via split decision.

Curran was expected to face Goiti Yamauchi at Bellator 139 on June 26, 2015. However, Yamauchi pulled out of the fight due to injury. Curran instead faced Emmanuel Sanchez at the event. He won the fight via unanimous decision.

Curran was expected to face Justin Lawrence at Bellator 145 on November 6, 2015. Curran pulled out of the bout due to a knee injury.

Curran faced Georgi Karakhanyan at Bellator 155 on May 20, 2016. In the first round, Curran knocked down his opponent with a left hand. Karakhanyan managed to recover and fight on, but in the end Curran won via unanimous decision.

Curran was expected to face John Teixeira at Bellator 167 on December 3, 2016, however, Curran pulled out of the bout due to an injury and was replaced by Justin Lawrence. The bout with Teixeira was rescheduled for Bellator 184 on October 6, 2017. Curran won the fight by unanimous decision.

After a year and a half long layoff, Curran returned to face rising Featherweight prospect A.J. McKee at Bellator 221 on May 11, 2019. He lost the fight via unanimous decision. In the heels of the defeat, Curran signed a contract extension with Bellator.

In the first round of the tournament, Curran got Ádám Borics as his opponent. The fight was held on 7 September 2019 on Bellator 226. At the end of round 2, a flying knee made an impact again and sent Curran to the floor. At the end of a huge amount of punches on the ground, the referee stopped the fight in the last second of the 2nd round.

Curran announced on October 27, 2020 that he was retiring from MMA.

== Championships and accomplishments ==
- Bellator MMA
  - Bellator Featherweight World Championship (Two times)
  - Two successful title defenses
  - Bellator Season Two Lightweight Tournament Winner
  - Bellator 2011 Summer Series Featherweight Tournament Winner
  - First Fighter to win tournaments in multiple weight classes
  - Two successful title defenses
- Inside Fights
  - Knockout of the Year (2012)
- Sherdog
  - 2011 All-Violence Second Team
- MMA Junkie
  - 2014 March Submission of the Month vs. Daniel Straus
- Bleacher Report
  - 2014 #10 Ranked Fight of the Year vs. Daniel Straus at Bellator 112

== Mixed martial arts record ==
Professional record breakdown
| 32 matches | 23 wins | 9 losses |
| By knockout | 5 | 1 |
| By submission | 7 | 1 |
| By decision | 11 | 7 |

| Res. | Record | Opponent | Method | Event | Date | Round | Time | Location | Notes |
|---|---|---|---|---|---|---|---|---|---|
| Loss | 23–9 | Ádám Borics | TKO (punches) | Bellator 226 | September 7, 2019 | 2 | 4:59 | San Jose, California, United States | Bellator Featherweight World Grand Prix Opening Round. |
| Loss | 23–8 | A. J. McKee | Decision (unanimous) | Bellator 221 | May 11, 2019 | 3 | 5:00 | Rosemont, Illinois, United States | |
| Win | 23–7 | John Macapá | Decision (unanimous) | Bellator 184 | October 6, 2017 | 3 | 5:00 | Thackerville, Oklahoma, United States | |
| Win | 22–7 | Georgi Karakhanyan | Decision (unanimous) | Bellator 155 | May 20, 2016 | 3 | 5:00 | Boise, Idaho, United States | |
| Win | 21–7 | Emmanuel Sanchez | Decision (unanimous) | Bellator 139 | June 26, 2015 | 3 | 5:00 | Mulvane, Kansas, United States | |
| Loss | 20–7 | Daniel Weichel | Decision (split) | Bellator 133 | February 13, 2015 | 3 | 5:00 | Fresno, California, United States | |
| Loss | 20–6 | Patrício Pitbull | Decision (unanimous) | Bellator 123 | September 5, 2014 | 5 | 5:00 | Uncasville, Connecticut, United States | Lost the Bellator Featherweight World Championship. |
| Win | 20–5 | Daniel Straus | Submission (rear-naked choke) | Bellator 112 | March 14, 2014 | 5 | 4:46 | Hammond, Indiana, United States | Won the Bellator Featherweight World Championship. |
| Loss | 19–5 | Daniel Straus | Decision (unanimous) | Bellator 106 | November 2, 2013 | 5 | 5:00 | Long Beach, California, United States | Lost the Bellator Featherweight World Championship. |
| Win | 19–4 | Shahbulat Shamhalaev | Technical Submission (guillotine choke) | Bellator 95 | April 4, 2013 | 1 | 2:38 | Atlantic City, New Jersey, United States | Defended the Bellator Featherweight World Championship. |
| Win | 18–4 | Patrício Pitbull | Decision (split) | Bellator 85 | January 17, 2013 | 5 | 5:00 | Irvine, California, United States | Defended the Bellator Featherweight World Championship. |
| Win | 17–4 | Joe Warren | KO (knees and punches) | Bellator 60 | March 9, 2012 | 3 | 1:25 | Hammond, Indiana, United States | Won the Bellator Featherweight World Championship. |
| Win | 16–4 | Marlon Sandro | KO (head kick) | Bellator 48 | August 20, 2011 | 2 | 4:00 | Uncasville, Connecticut, United States | Bellator 2011 Summer Series Featherweight Tournament Final. |
| Win | 15–4 | Ronnie Mann | Decision (unanimous) | Bellator 47 | July 23, 2011 | 3 | 5:00 | Rama, Ontario, Canada | Bellator 2011 Summer Series Featherweight Tournament Semifinal. |
| Win | 14–4 | Luis Palomino | Submission (Peruvian necktie) | Bellator 46 | June 25, 2011 | 1 | 3:49 | Hollywood, Florida, United States | Bellator 2011 Summer Series Featherweight Tournament Quarterfinal. |
| Loss | 13–4 | Eddie Alvarez | Decision (unanimous) | Bellator 39 | April 2, 2011 | 5 | 5:00 | Uncasville, Connecticut, United States | For the Bellator Lightweight World Championship. |
| Win | 13–3 | Toby Imada | Decision (split) | Bellator 21 | June 10, 2010 | 3 | 5:00 | Hollywood, Florida, United States | Bellator Season Two Lightweight Tournament Final. |
| Win | 12–3 | Roger Huerta | Decision (unanimous) | Bellator 17 | May 6, 2010 | 3 | 5:00 | Boston, Massachusetts, United States | Bellator Season Two Lightweight Tournament Semifinal. |
| Win | 11–3 | Mike Ricci | KO (punch) | Bellator 14 | April 15, 2010 | 1 | 3:01 | Chicago, Illinois, United States | Bellator Season Two Lightweight Tournament Quarterfinal. |
| Win | 10–3 | Robbie Olivier | Decision (unanimous) | Trojan MMA: Trojan Warfare | February 27, 2010 | 3 | 5:00 | Exeter, England, United Kingdom | |
| Loss | 9–3 | Travis Perzynski | Submission (rear-naked choke) | XFO 34: Curran vs. Hori | December 5, 2009 | 2 | 4:38 | Lakemoor, Illinois, United States | |
| Win | 9–2 | Jay Ellis | Submission (guillotine choke) | XFO 32 | October 10, 2009 | 1 | 0:58 | New Munster, Wisconsin, United States | |
| Win | 8–2 | Lucas Gwaltney | TKO (punches) | XFO 31: Outdoor War 5 | August 15, 2009 | 1 | 1:32 | Island Lake, Illinois, United States | |
| Loss | 7–2 | Charles Diaz | Decision (split) | Elite Fighting Challenge 4 | June 27, 2009 | 3 | 5:00 | Norfolk, Virginia, United States | |
| Win | 7–1 | Mike Pickett | Submission (rear-naked choke) | XFO 30 | May 2, 2009 | 1 | 1:56 | New Munster, Wisconsin, United States | |
| Win | 6–1 | Daniel Straus | KO (punches) | XFO 29 | April 27, 2009 | 2 | 1:31 | Lakemoor, Illinois, United States | |
| Win | 5–1 | Ramiro Hernandez | Decision (unanimous) | Adrenaline MMA 2: Miletich vs. Denny | December 11, 2008 | 3 | 5:00 | Moline, Illinois, United States | |
| Loss | 4–1 | Darren Elkins | Decision (unanimous) | C3: Domination | November 22, 2008 | 3 | 5:00 | Hammond, Indiana, United States | For the C3 Lightweight Championship. |
| Win | 4–0 | Jay Ellis | Submission (rear-naked choke) | XFO 25 | August 9, 2008 | 1 | 0:51 | Island Lake, Illinois, United States | |
| Win | 3–0 | Amir Khillah | Decision (unanimous) | XFO 25: Outdoor War 4 | August 9, 2008 | 3 | 5:00 | Island Lake, Illinois, United States | |
| Win | 2–0 | Lazar Stojadinovic | Decision (unanimous) | XFO 23: Title Night | April 25, 2008 | 3 | 5:00 | Lakemoor, Illinois, United States | Bout featured on Tapout reality series. |
| Win | 1–0 | Tony Hervey | Submission (rear-naked choke) | XFO 22: Rising Star | February 23, 2008 | 1 | 1:24 | Crystal Lake, Illinois, United States | |

== See also ==
- List of mixed martial artists
