= Daniel Straus (fighter) =

American mixed martial arts fighter

Daniel Mason-Straus
- Born: Daniel Mason-Straus; July 27, 1984 (age 42); Cincinnati, Ohio, U.S.
- Height: 5 ft 8 in (1.73 m)
- Weight: 145 lb (66 kg; 10.4 st)
- Division: Featherweight
- Reach: 67 in (170 cm)
- Fighting out of: Cincinnati, Ohio, United States
- Team: American Top Team; Vision MMA
- Years active: 2009–2021

Mixed martial arts record
- Total: 36
- Wins: 26
- By knockout: 7
- By submission: 4
- By decision: 15
- Losses: 10
- By knockout: 3
- By submission: 5
- By decision: 2

Other information
- Notable school: Sycamore High School
- Mixed martial arts record from Sherdog

Daniel Mason-Straus (born July 27, 1984), is an American former professional mixed martial artist who competed in the Featherweight division. He previously competed in Bellator MMA, where he is the former two-time Bellator Featherweight Champion. A professional competitor since 2009, Straus has also formerly competed for Shark Fights.

== Background ==
Straus was born in Cincinnati, Ohio, and grew up in the nearby suburb of Sycamore Township. Straus came from a troubled household and by the time he was a junior in high school he was living on his own and supporting himself, which included involvement in criminal activities. Straus was a highly successful and highly controversial high school wrestler at Sycamore High School. As a freshman in the (112 lbs.) weight class, Straus was an alternate for the state tournament and in his sophomore season he went 2–2 in the state tournament. In his junior season, Straus finished third in the state in Division I (135 lbs.) and in his senior year he was ruled academically ineligible and missed the second half of the season (including the state tournament). However, he was given a wild card berth into the NHSCA Senior Nationals (high school senior national championship) and won the tournament. Straus is considered by some in the Ohio wrestling media to be one of the best Ohio wrestlers of the decade (2001–2010) and one of the greatest Ohio high school wrestlers to never win a state title. In addition to wrestling, Straus also played soccer and ran for the track and field team in high school. After graduating, Straus moved to Florida and worked in maintenance, but was arrested on robbery charges and was incarcerated from 2004 to 2007.

== Mixed martial arts career ==
=== Early career ===
Straus returned to Cincinnati after his release from prison and was introduced to mixed martial arts by a friend who was a former high school wrestling opponent. He invited Straus to come train with him at Team Vision and Straus made his professional debut in February 2009.

=== Shark Fights ===
Straus was a late replacement for Marcus Hicks at Shark Fights 13: Jardine vs. Prangley where he beat WEC veteran Karen Darabedyan via unanimous decision.

=== Bellator MMA ===
Straus made his Bellator debut on June 24, 2010, at Bellator 23 where he defeated Chad Hinton via unanimous decision.

In January 2011, Bellator announced that Straus would be part of the Bellator Season Four Featherweight Tournament. In the quarter-finals, Straus fought Nazareno Malegarie. Straus defeated Malegarie via unanimous decision to move on to the semifinals and give Malegarie the first loss of his career. The fight won Fight of the Night honors.

At Bellator 41, Straus competed in the semifinals of the Season Four Tournament against Kenny Foster. Straus controlled the fight for the first two rounds before he finished Foster via guillotine choke submission and moved on to the finals of the tournament. Straus met Patricio Freire in the Season Four Tournament Final at Bellator 45. He lost the fight via unanimous decision.

Straus returned in the Bellator Season Six Featherweight Tournament that started on March 9, 2012. He defeated Jeremy Spoon via unanimous decision in the opening round at Bellator 60. In the semifinal round, Straus faced Mike Corey at Bellator 65 and again won by unanimous decision. In the finals, Straus faced Marlon Sandro at Bellator 68 and won via unanimous decision. This win earned him a title shot and rematch against Featherweight Champion Pat Curran, who had previous beaten Straus in 2009.

At Bellator 78, Straus took a fight to keep himself busy while waiting for his title shot. He fought Royce Gracie black belt, Alvin Robinson, defeating him via submission in the second round.

Straus was scheduled to face Pat Curran on April 4, 2013, for the Featherweight Title at Bellator 95. However, on February 26, it was announced that Straus had broken his hand and had to pull out of the fight.

The Featherweight Championship fight between Curran and Straus took place on November 2, 2013, at Bellator 106. Straus won the fight by unanimous decision to become the new Bellator Featherweight Champion.

Straus is scheduled to face Pat Curran for the third time at Bellator 112 on March 14, 2014. Straus publicly expressed his displeasure in having to face Curran again so soon after beating him, going so far as to say he believes Bellator wants Curran as champion. However, he also stated it is his job to fight and he welcomed the bout. At the weigh ins for Bellator 112, Straus had to cut his hair to make weight. He lost the bout via rear naked choke in the fifth round.

Straus faced Justin Wilcox in the main event at Bellator 127 on October 3, 2014. He won the fight via knockout in the first round.

Straus challenged Patrício Freire for the Bellator Featherweight Championship in a rematch at Bellator 132 on January 16, 2015. Freire won the back-and-forth fight in the fourth round via a rear-naked choke submission.

Straus faced undefeated prospect Henry Corrales at Bellator 138 on June 19, 2015. He won the fight via submission in the second round.

Straus had a third fight with Freire on November 6, 2015, at Bellator 145. He won the fight via unanimous decision to reclaim the Bellator Featherweight Championship.

Over a year since his last fight, Straus returned to defend his title against Freire in a fourth fight in the main event at Bellator 178 on April 21, 2017. After a back-and-forth first round, Straus lost the bout via a submission due to a guillotine choke early in the second round.

Straus faced Emmanuel Sanchez at Bellator 184 on October 6, 2017. He lost the fight via triangle choke submission in the third round.

After a 17-month long layoff due to severe injuries suffered in a motorcycle accident, Straus returned to the cage on March 29, 2019, at Bellator 219 and faced Shane Krutchen. He was victorious by way of first round submission.

Straus next faced Derek Campos in the opening round of the Bellator Featherweight World Grand Prix at Bellator 226 on September 7, 2019. He lost the bout via unanimous decision.

On July 10, 2021, it was announced that he was no longer under contract with Bellator.

=== Post Bellator ===
Straus faced Keith Richardson on October 23, 2021, in the co-main event of XMMA 3. He lost the bout via TKO due to ground and pound.

== Bare-knuckle boxing ==
=== Bare Knuckle Fighting Championship ===
Straus made his debut against boxer Dat Nguyen at BKFC 38 in the main event and lost by unanimous decision in the sixth round after the first five rounds were ruled a draw.

Straus faced former UFC fighter Jimmie Rivera in the main event at BKFC 61 on May 11, 2024. He lost the fight by unanimous decision.

== Personal life ==
Straus has a daughter.

On March 1, 2013, Straus was arrested in Fort Lauderdale, Florida after his vehicle was pulled over. He faced charges of driving with a suspended license, possession of more than 20 grams of marijuana, more than three grams of synthetic cannabis, possession of drug paraphernalia, and possession of MDMA.

In the early morning hours of December 17, 2017, Straus was involved in an accident while riding his Suzuki GSX-R1000 motorcycle on State Road 7 in Dade County, Florida. He was unconscious for an unknown amount of time, and was unable to move his extremities upon regaining consciousness. His passenger was able to get help and Straus was transported to hospital. Although no alcohol was involved, it is still unknown what caused the accident. His passenger was unharmed. It would take eight months and extreme physical therapy before Straus could walk again on his own. Once able to move again without assistance, Daniel Straus made the decision to get back into physical shape and continue his professional MMA career. His long journey back culminated with his comeback fight at Bellator 219 on March 29, 2019, a bout which he won via submission.

On February 6, 2021, Straus was arrested in Broward County, Florida and was charged aggravated domestic battery with a weapon after he allegedly stabbed his ex-girlfriend with a sharp object. According to the affidavit, Straus showed up to the alleged victim's place of work after the two argued over text message. Once he arrived, the two allegedly got into a verbal dispute. Straus followed the alleged victim as she walked to her car, at which point the victim claimed Straus pushed and struck her, knocking her to the ground. She then stated that Straus left the scene and later called her, informing her he was at her apartment. Fearing Straus would destroy her property, she drove to his apartment to retrieve a spare key to her own apartment. In the interim, Straus would arrive back at his home, where he would attack the alleged victim with a sharp object, creating multiple stab wounds. The victim fled the scene and went to a neighbor's home, and from there she was taken to a nearby hospital for examination. An arrest warrant for Straus was issued, and he was booked into the Broward County jail. He was released on $100,000 bail.

== Championships and accomplishments ==
=== Mixed martial arts ===
- Bellator MMA
  - Bellator Featherweight World Championship (Two times)
  - Bellator Season Four Featherweight Tournament Runner-up
  - Bellator Season Six Featherweight Tournament Winner
- North American Allied Fight Series
  - NAAFS Undisputed Pro Series Lightweight Championship (One time)
  - NAAFS Interim Pro Series Lightweight Championship (One time)
- MMA Junkie
  - 2015 #3 Ranked Fight of the Year vs. Patrício Pitbull 3 at Bellator 145
  - November 2015 Fight of the Month vs. Patrício Pitbull 3 at Bellator 145
- Bleacher Report
  - 2014 #10 Ranked Fight of the Year vs. Pat Curran at Bellator 112

=== Amateur Wrestling ===
- National High School Coaches Association
  - NHSCA Senior High School National Championship (2003)
  - NHSCA Senior All-American (2003)
- Ohio High School Athletic Association
  - OHSAA Division I High School State Championship Third Place (2002)
  - OHSAA Division I All-State (2002)
  - Sycamore High School Record for Best Season Record (42–1; 2003)

== Mixed martial arts record ==
Professional record breakdown
36 matches	26 wins	10 losses
By knockout	7	3
By submission	4	5
By decision	15	2

Res.	Record	Opponent	Method	Event	Date	Round	Time	Location	Notes
Loss	26–10	Keith Richardson	TKO (punches)	XMMA 3: Vice City	October 23, 2021	2	1:54	Miami, Florida, United States	Lightweight bout.
Loss	26–9	Derek Campos	Decision (unanimous)	Bellator 226	September 7, 2019	3	5:00	San Jose, California, United States	Bellator Featherweight World Grand Prix Opening Round.
Win	26–8	Shane Kruchten	Submission (rear-naked choke)	Bellator 219	March 29, 2019	1	3:53	Temecula, California, United States	Lightweight bout.
Loss	25–8	Emmanuel Sanchez	Submission (triangle choke)	Bellator 184	October 6, 2017	3	1:56	Thackerville, Oklahoma, United States	
Loss	25–7	Patricio Freire	Submission (guillotine choke)	Bellator 178	April 21, 2017	2	0:37	Uncasville, Connecticut, United States	Lost the Bellator Featherweight World Championship.
Win	25–6	Patricio Freire	Decision (unanimous)	Bellator 145	November 6, 2015	5	5:00	St. Louis, Missouri, United States	Won the Bellator Featherweight World Championship.
Win	24–6	Henry Corrales	Submission (guillotine choke)	Bellator 138	June 19, 2015	2	3:47	St. Louis, Missouri, United States	
Loss	23–6	Patricio Freire	Submission (rear-naked choke)	Bellator 132	January 16, 2015	4	4:49	Temecula, California, United States	For the Bellator Featherweight World Championship.
Win	23–5	Justin Wilcox	KO (punches)	Bellator 127	October 3, 2014	1	0:50	Temecula, California, United States	
Loss	22–5	Pat Curran	Submission (rear-naked choke)	Bellator 112	March 14, 2014	5	4:46	Hammond, Indiana, United States	Lost the Bellator Featherweight World Championship
Win	22–4	Pat Curran	Decision (unanimous)	Bellator 106	November 2, 2013	5	5:00	Long Beach, California, United States	Won the Bellator Featherweight Championship
Win	21–4	Alvin Robinson	Submission (rear-naked choke)	Bellator 78	October 26, 2012	2	4:51	Dayton, Ohio, United States	
Win	20–4	Marlon Sandro	Decision (unanimous)	Bellator 68	May 11, 2012	3	5:00	Atlantic City, New Jersey, United States	Bellator Season Six Featherweight Tournament Final
Win	19–4	Mike Corey	Decision (unanimous)	Bellator 65	April 13, 2012	3	5:00	Atlantic City, New Jersey, United States	Bellator Season Six Featherweight Tournament Semifinal
Win	18–4	Jeremy Spoon	Decision (unanimous)	Bellator 60	March 9, 2012	3	5:00	Hammond, Indiana, United States	Bellator Season Six Featherweight Tournament Quarterfinal
Win	17–4	Jason Dent	Decision (unanimous)	NAAFS: Caged Fury 15	October 15, 2011	5	5:00	Cleveland, Ohio, United States	Won and unified NAAFS Pro Series Lightweight Championship
Loss	16–4	Patricio Freire	Decision (unanimous)	Bellator 45	May 21, 2011	3	5:00	Lake Charles, Louisiana, United States	Bellator Season Four Featherweight Tournament Final
Win	16–3	Kenny Foster	Submission (guillotine choke)	Bellator 41	April 16, 2011	3	3:48	Yuma, Arizona, United States	Bellator Season Four Featherweight Tournament Semifinal
Win	15–3	Nazareno Malegarie	Decision (unanimous)	Bellator 37	March 19, 2011	3	5:00	Concho, Oklahoma, United States	Bellator Season Four Featherweight Tournament Quarterfinal
Win	14–3	Karen Darabedyan	Decision (unanimous)	Shark Fights 13: Jardine vs Prangley	September 11, 2010	3	5:00	Amarillo, Texas, United States	
Win	13–3	Joe Pearson	TKO (punches)	XFO 36: Outdoor War 6	August 14, 2010	2	4:04	Island Lake, Illinois, United States	
Win	12–3	Chad Hinton	Decision (unanimous)	Bellator 23	June 24, 2010	3	5:00	Louisville, Kentucky, United States	
Win	11–3	Travis Perzynski	Decision (unanimous)	ICE: International Combat Events 45	March 13, 2010	3	5:00	Forest Park, Ohio, United States	
Win	10–3	Frank Caraballo	TKO (punches)	NAAFS: Caged Fury 9	February 20, 2010	5	3:57	Cleveland, Ohio, United States	Won NAAFS Interim Pro Series Lightweight Championship.
Win	9–3	Gideon Ray	Decision (unanimous)	XFO 33	January 23, 2010	3	5:00	Chicago, Illinois, United States	
Win	8–3	Joe Heiland	Decision (unanimous)	NAAFS: Night of Champions 2009	December 5, 2009	3	5:00	Akron, Ohio, United States	
Win	7–3	Patrick Ferm	TKO (punches)	XFO 32	October 10, 2009	1	1:50	New Munster, Wisconsin, United States	
Win	6–3	Tim Troxell	TKO (elbows and punches)	Xtreme Caged Combat: Cops vs. Cons	October 3, 2009	1	3:51	Reading, Pennsylvania, United States	
Win	5–3	Mitch Lyons	TKO (punches)	Indiana Xtreme Fighting 1: Wildcard	June 26, 2009	3	2:13	Rising Sun, Indiana, United States	
Loss	4–3	Pat Curran	KO (punches)	XFO 29	April 17, 2009	2	1:31	Lakemoor, Illinois, United States	
Win	4–2	Mike Baskis	Decision (unanimous)	ICF: Breakout	April 11, 2009	3	5:00	Cincinnati, Ohio, United States	
Win	3–2	Lester Caslow	Decision (split)	Extreme Challenge: Mayhem at the Marina	March 28, 2009	3	5:00	Atlantic City, New Jersey, United States	
Win	2–2	Tim Cook	TKO (punches)	ICF: Turfwar	March 14, 2009	2	0:11	Florence, Kentucky, United States	
Loss	1–2	Scott Bickerstaff	TKO (punches)	MMA Big Show: Retribution	March 7, 2009	1	N/A	Switzerland County, Indiana, United States	
Win	1–1	David Silva	Decision (unanimous)	XFO 28	February 27, 2009	3	5:00	Lakemoor, Illinois, United States	
Loss	0–1	Jay Ellis	Submission (Rear-Naked Choke)	XFO: New Blood	February 7, 2009	2	2:46	Delray Beach, Florida, United States	

== Bare knuckle record ==
Professional record breakdown
2 matches	0 wins	2 losses
By decision	0	2

Res.	Record	Opponent	Method	Event	Date	Round	Time	Location	Notes
Loss	0–2	Jimmie Rivera	Decision (unanimous)	BKFC 61	May 11, 2024	5	2:00	Uncasville, Connecticut, United States	
Loss	0–1	Dat Nguyen	Decision (unanimous)	BKFC 38: Nguyen vs. Straus	April 21, 2023	6	2:00	Delray Beach, Florida, United States	Fight went to a sixth round after the first five rounds were ruled a draw.

== See also ==
- List of male mixed martial artists
- List of Bellator champions
