= Emmanuel Sanchez =

American mixed martial artist (born 1990)

- Born: August 11, 1990 (age 36); Milwaukee, Wisconsin, United States
- Other names: Matador
- Nationality: Mexican; American
- Height: 5 ft 9 in (1.75 m)
- Weight: 145.2 lb (65.9 kg; 10.37 st)
- Division: Welterweight; Lightweight; Featherweight
- Reach: 76 in (193 cm)
- Fighting out of: Milwaukee, Wisconsin, United States
- Team: Roufusport (2013–present)
- Rank: Black belt in Karate under Duke Roufus; Black belt in Brazilian Jiu-Jitsu under Daniel Wanderley
- Years active: 2011–present

Mixed martial arts record
- Total: 37
- Wins: 24
- By knockout: 1
- By submission: 10
- By decision: 13
- Losses: 13
- By knockout: 1
- By submission: 1
- By decision: 11

Other information
- Mixed martial arts record from Sherdog

Emmanuel Sanchez (born August 11, 1990) is a mixed martial artist currently in the Lightweight division. A professional competitor since 2011, Sanchez has formerly competed for Bellator MMA, where he was a contender for the Featherweight World Championship, and Resurrection Fighting Alliance.

== Background ==
Born and raised in a lower-middle-class family of Mexican immigrants, Sanchez wrestled as a kid but did not continue to the high school level in the sport. He became interested in MMA and Brazilian jiu-jitsu while attending high school. After a successful amateur career, Sanchez began his professional career in 2011, starting his professional career at 4–0.

== Mixed martial arts career ==
=== Early career ===
Sanchez began his professional MMA career in November 2011. He compiled a record of 8–1 before signing with Bellator MMA. During this time, Sanchez mainly competed in the lightweight division, before moving down to featherweight. He also competed once as a welterweight, in which he suffered his first professional loss against current UFC competitor Lewis Gonzalez.

=== Bellator MMA ===
Sanchez made his promotional debut against Stephen Banaszak at Bellator 128 on October 10, 2014. He won the fight via rear-naked choke submission at 2:18 in the first round.

In his second fight for the promotion, Sanchez faced Alejandro Villalobos at Bellator 135 on March 27, 2015. He won the back-and-forth fight via unanimous decision.

Stepping in for an injured Goiti Yamauchi, Sanchez faced former Bellator featherweight champion Pat Curran at Bellator 139 on June 26, 2015. He lost the fight via unanimous decision.

Sanchez next faced Henry Corrales at Bellator 143 on September 25, 2015. He won the fight via split decision.

In his highest profile fight to date, Sanchez faced UFC veteran Justin Lawrence on November 6, 2015 at Bellator 145. He won the back-and-forth fight via split decision.

As the last fight of his prevailing contract, Sanchez next faced Daniel Pineda on the main card at Bellator 149 on February 19, 2016. He won the fight by split decision.

As the first fight of his new, multi-year contract with Bellator, Sanchez faced Daniel Weichel at Bellator 159 on July 22, 2016. He lost via split decision.

Sanchez returned the following January and faced Georgi Karakhanyan at Bellator 170. He won the fight via majority decision. One point was taken from Sanchez in the second round due to two illegal knee strikes.

Sanchez faced former Bellator bantamweight champion Marcos Galvao, who moved up to the featherweight division, at Bellator 175 on March 31, 2017. He won the fight via unanimous decision.

Sanchez faced Daniel Straus at Bellator 184 on October 6, 2017. He won the fight via triangle choke submission in the third round.

Sanchez faced Sam Sicilia at Bellator 198 on April 28, 2018. He won the fight by submission due to an arm triangle from the back position in the 1st round.

Sanchez faced Bellator Featherweight Champion Patrício Freire at Bellator 209 on November 16, 2018. He lost the fight by unanimous decision.

Sanchez faced Georgi Karakhanyan at Bellator 218 on March 22, 2019. He won the bout via unanimous decision.

==== Bellator Featherweight World Grand Prix ====
Sanchez next faced prospect Tywan Claxton in the opening round of the Bellator Featherweight World Grand Prix on September 7, 2019 at Bellator 226. He won the fight via submission in the second round.

In the quarterfinals, Sanchez was initially expected to face Daniel Weichel in a rematch in February 2020. However, the date got pushed back and they were next expected to face at Bellator 241 on March 13, 2020. Eventually the whole event was cancelled due to the prevailing COVID-19 pandemic. The bout was rescheduled and took place at Bellator 252 on November 12. Sanchez won the bout via unanimous decision.

In the semifinals, Sanchez faced Patrício Freire for the Bellator Featherweight World Championship at Bellator 255 on April 2. This was a rematch of their November 2018 bout which saw Freire win by unanimous decision. He lost the fight via technical submission in round one.

==== Post Grand Prix ====
Sanchez faced Mads Burnell at Bellator 263 on July 31, 2021. He lost the very close bout via unanimous decision.

Sanchez faced Jeremy Kennedy on December 3, 2021 at Bellator 272. He lost the bout via unanimous decision.

Moving up to Lightweight, Sanchez faced Yancy Medeiros on April 23, 2022 at Bellator 279. Sanchez lost the bout via unanimous decision.

Sanchez faced Archie Colgan on June 16, 2023 at Bellator 297. He lost the bout via unanimous decision.

=== Post Bellator ===
Sanchez faced Daniel Salas on April 12, 2024 at XFC 50. He won the fight by unanimous decision.

Sanchez faced Peter Petties on May 25, 2024 in the main event of Anthony Pettis 11. He won the fight via second round submission.

== Mixed martial arts record ==
Professional record breakdown
37 matches	24 wins	13 losses
By knockout	1	1
By submission	10	1
By decision	13	11

Res.	Record	Opponent	Method	Event	Date	Round	Time	Location	Notes
Loss	24–13	Kegan Gennrich	Decision (unanimous)	Anthony Pettis FC 24	August 16, 2026	3	5:00	Milwaukee, Wisconsin, United States	Catchweight (160 lb) bout.
Loss	24–12	James Pleasant	Decision (unanimous)	Anthony Pettis FC 22	March 22, 2026	5	5:00	Albuquerque, New Mexico, United States	For the APFC Lightweight Championship.
Win	24–11	Zach Zane	Submission (arm-triangle choke)	Anthony Pettis FC 17	June 15, 2025	2	2:40	Milwaukee, Wisconsin, United States	Won the vacant APFC Welterweight Championship.
Win	23–11	John Simon	Decision (unanimous)	Borroka Promotion 2	March 28, 2025	3	5:00	Las Vegas, Nevada, United States	
Loss	22–11	Kenneth Cross	Decision (unanimous)	XFC 51	September 27, 2024	3	5:00	Milwaukee, Wisconsin, United States	
Loss	22–10	Yuji Yannick Ephoeviga	KO (punches)	TTF Challenge 10	August 16, 2024	1	3:40	Tokyo, Japan	
Win	22–9	Peter Petties	Technical Submission (guillotine choke)	Anthony Pettis FC 11	May 25, 2024	2	1:02	Milwaukee, Wisconsin, United States	Catchweight (160 lb) bout.
Win	21–9	Daniel Salas	Decision (unanimous)	XFC 50	April 12, 2024	3	5:00	Lakeland, Florida, United States	
Loss	20–9	Archie Colgan	Decision (unanimous)	Bellator 297	June 16, 2023	3	5:00	Chicago, Illinois, United States	
Loss	20–8	Yancy Medeiros	Decision (unanimous)	Bellator 279	April 23, 2022	3	5:00	Honolulu, Hawaii, United States	Return to Lightweight.
Loss	20–7	Jeremy Kennedy	Decision (unanimous)	Bellator 272	December 3, 2021	3	5:00	Uncasville, Connecticut, United States	
Loss	20–6	Mads Burnell	Decision (unanimous)	Bellator 263	July 31, 2021	3	5:00	Los Angeles, California, United States	
Loss	20–5	Patrício Pitbull	Technical Submission (guillotine choke)	Bellator 255	April 2, 2021	1	3:35	Uncasville, Connecticut, United States	Bellator Featherweight World Grand Prix Semifinal. For the Bellator Featherweight World Championship.
Win	20–4	Daniel Weichel	Decision (unanimous)	Bellator 252	November 12, 2020	5	5:00	Uncasville, Connecticut, United States	Bellator Featherweight World Grand Prix Quarterfinal.
Win	19–4	Tywan Claxton	Submission (triangle choke)	Bellator 226	September 7, 2019	2	4:11	San Jose, California, United States	Bellator Featherweight World Grand Prix Opening Round.
Win	18–4	Georgi Karakhanyan	Decision (unanimous)	Bellator 218	March 22, 2019	3	5:00	Thackerville, Oklahoma, United States	
Loss	17–4	Patrício Pitbull	Decision (unanimous)	Bellator 209	November 15, 2018	5	5:00	Tel Aviv, Israel	For the Bellator Featherweight World Championship.
Win	17–3	Sam Sicilia	Submission (arm-triangle choke)	Bellator 198	April 28, 2018	1	3:52	Rosemont, Illinois, United States	
Win	16–3	Daniel Straus	Submission (triangle choke)	Bellator 184	October 6, 2017	3	1:56	Thackerville, Oklahoma, United States	
Win	15–3	Marcos Galvão	Decision (unanimous)	Bellator 175	March 31, 2017	3	5:00	Rosemont, Illinois, United States	
Win	14–3	Georgi Karakhanyan	Decision (majority)	Bellator 170	January 21, 2017	3	5:00	Inglewood, California, United States	
Loss	13–3	Daniel Weichel	Decision (split)	Bellator 159	July 22, 2016	3	5:00	Mulvane, Kansas, United States	
Win	13–2	Daniel Pineda	Decision (split)	Bellator 149	February 19, 2016	3	5:00	Houston, Texas, United States	Catchweight (150 lb) bout.
Win	12–2	Justin Lawrence	Decision (split)	Bellator 145	November 6, 2015	3	5:00	St. Louis, Missouri, United States	
Win	11–2	Henry Corrales	Decision (split)	Bellator 143	September 25, 2015	3	5:00	Hidalgo, Texas, United States	
Loss	10–2	Pat Curran	Decision (unanimous)	Bellator 139	June 26, 2015	3	5:00	Mulvane, Kansas, United States	
Win	10–1	Alejandro Villalobos	Decision (unanimous)	Bellator 135	March 27, 2015	3	5:00	Thackerville, Oklahoma, United States	
Win	9–1	Stephen Banaszak	Submission (rear-naked choke)	Bellator 128	October 10, 2014	1	2:18	Thackerville, Oklahoma, United States	
Win	8–1	Brady Hovermale	Submission (armbar)	North American FC: Summer Slam	July 26, 2014	1	1:53	Milwaukee, Wisconsin, United States	
Win	7–1	Jose Pacheco	Submission (triangle choke)	North American FC: Mega Brawl MMA	May 31, 2014	1	2:44	Milwaukee, Wisconsin, United States	Featherweight debut.
Win	6–1	Gustavo Rodriguez	KO (punch)	North American FC: Super Brawl 2	January 31, 2014	1	3:53	Milwaukee, Wisconsin, United States	
Win	5–1	Michael McBride	Decision (unanimous)	RFA 10	October 25, 2013	3	5:00	Des Moines, Iowa, United States	Return to Lightweight.
Loss	4–1	Lewis Gonzalez	Decision (unanimous)	West Coast FC 5	May 3, 2013	3	5:00	Sacramento, California, United States	Welterweight debut.
Win	4–0	Brandon Dudley	Decision (split)	CageSport 21	September 29, 2012	3	5:00	Fife, Washington, United States	
Win	3–0	Travis Johnson	Submission (rear-naked choke)	United Combat Sports: Caged Combat 6	July 14, 2012	2	2:51	Grand Ronde, Oregon, United States	
Win	2–0	Juan Carlos Rodriguez	Submission (rear-naked choke)	Northwest Fighting: Young Guns 1	April 28, 2012	1	3:24	Usk, Washington, United States	
Win	1–0	Matt Church	Decision (unanimous)	Fight Night Round 17: Clash at the College	November 19, 2011	3	5:00	Mount Vernon, Washington, United States	Lightweight debut; Sanchez missed weight (158.5 lb).

== See also ==
- List of male mixed martial artists
