= PFL 10 (2025) =

Professional Fighters League MMA event in 2025

- The poster for PFL 10
- Promotion: Professional Fighters League
- Date: August 21, 2025
- Venue: Seminole Hard Rock Hotel & Casino Hollywood
- City: Hollywood, Florida, United States

Event chronology
PFL 9	PFL 10	PFL Europe 3

The PFL 10 mixed martial arts event for the 2025 season of the Professional Fighters League was held on August 21, 2025, at Seminole Hard Rock Hotel & Casino Hollywood in Hollywood, Florida, United States. This event marked the finals of the single-elimination tournament format in the Heavyweight, Light heavyweight and Middleweight divisions.

== Background ==
The event marked the promotion's seventh visit to Hollywood and first since PFL 8 (2024) in August 2024.

The event featured the finals of 2025 PFL World Tournament in the middleweight, light heavyweight and heavyweight divisions.

== Results ==
Main card (ESPN / ESPN+)
Weight class				Method	Round	Time	Notes
Middleweight	Fabian Edwards	def.	Dalton Rosta	KO (head kick)	3	1:28	(Note: 2025 PFL Middleweight Tournament Final.)
Heavyweight	Oleg Popov	def.	Alexander Romanov	Decision (split) (47–48, 49–46, 48–47)	5	5:00	(Note: 2025 PFL Heavyweight Tournament Final.)
Light Heavyweight	Antônio Carlos Júnior	def.	Sullivan Cauley	Submission (rear-naked choke)	2	3:44	(Note: 2025 PFL Light Heavyweight Tournament Final.)
Preliminary card (ESPN+)
Featherweight	Alexei Pergande	def.	Ethan Goss	Submission (brabo choke)	1	3:52
Bantamweight	Lazaro Dayron	def.	Bryce Meredith	TKO (punches)	3	4:06
Middleweight	Impa Kasanganay	def.	Andrew Sanchez	TKO (punches)	3	4:31
Light Heavyweight	Rasul Magomedov	def.	Guilherme Viana	Decision (unanimous) (30–27, 30–27, 30–27)	3	5:00
Heavyweight	Sergey Bilostenniy	def.	Karl Williams	TKO (punches)	2	4:11
Middleweight	Josh Silveira	def.	Murad Ramazanov	Decision (unanimous) (30–27, 29–28, 29–28)	3	5:00
Catchweight (175 lb)	Jean-Pierre Saint Louis	def.	Tyler Ray	Decision (unanimous) (30–27, 29–28, 29–28)	3	5:00

== Tournament brackets ==
=== 2025 PFL Heavyweight Tournament ===
Quarter-finals
(Russia) Valentin Moldavsky	UD
(Russia) Sergey Bilostenniy	3
(Moldova) Alexander Romanov	SUB
(United States) Timothy Johnson	1
(England) Abraham Bably	3
(Brazil) Rodrigo Nascimento (Note: Pouya Rahmani withdrew from the tournament due to visa issues and was replaced by Rodrigo Nascimento.)	SD
(Russia) Oleg Popov	SD
(United States Virgin Islands) Karl Williams (Note: Linton Vassell withdrew from the tournament and was replaced by Karl Williams.)	3

Semi-finals
(Russia) Valentin Moldavsky	1
(Moldova) Alexander Romanov	NC
(Brazil) Rodrigo Nascimento	3
(Russia) Oleg Popov	UD

Final
(Moldova) Alexander Romanov	5
(Russia) Oleg Popov	SD

=== 2025 PFL Light Heavyweight Tournament ===
Quarter-finals
(United States) Phil Davis	TKO
(Australia) Rob Wilkinson	2
(United States) Alex Polizzi (Note: Marcelo Nunes withdrew from the tournament before event started and was replaced by Alex Polizzi.)	1
(United States) Sullivan Cauley	TKO
(Republic of Ireland) Karl Moore	3
(Brazil) Antônio Carlos Júnior	SD
(Sweden) Karl Albrektsson	2
(England) Simeon Powell	TKO

Semi-finals
(United States) Phil Davis	3
(United States) Sullivan Cauley	UD
(Brazil) Antônio Carlos Júnior	UD
(England) Simeon Powell	3

Final
(United States) Sullivan Cauley	2
(Brazil) Antônio Carlos Júnior	SUB

=== 2025 PFL Middleweight Tournament ===
Quarter-finals
(United States) Impa Kasanganay	1
(England) Fabian Edwards	TKO
(England) Mike Shipman	3
(United States) Josh Silveira	UD
(United States) Dalton Rosta	SUB
(Sweden) Sadibou Sy	2
(Canada) Aaron Jeffery	SD
(Russia) Murad Ramazanov	3

Semi-finals
(England) Fabian Edwards	UD
(United States) Josh Silveira	3
(United States) Dalton Rosta	SD
(Canada) Aaron Jeffery	3

Final
(England) Fabian Edwards	KO
(United States) Dalton Rosta	3

== See also ==
- List of PFL events
- List of current PFL fighters
