= Sergey Bilostenniy =

Russian mixed martial artist (born 1995)

- Born: 23 October 1995 (age 31); Serpukhov, Russia
- Height: 6 ft 1 in (1.85 m)
- Weight: 262 lb (119 kg; 18.7 st)
- Division: Heavyweight; Light heavyweight (2017)
- Reach: 75 in (191 cm)
- Fighting out of: Serpukhov, Russia
- Team: Raty Team
- Years active: 2015–present

Mixed martial arts record
- Total: 20
- Wins: 16
- By knockout: 10
- By submission: 1
- By decision: 5
- Losses: 4
- By submission: 2
- By decision: 1
- By disqualification: 1

Other information
- Mixed martial arts record from Sherdog

Sergey Vyacheslavovich Bilostenniy (Russian: Сергей Вячеславович Билостенный; born 23 October 1995) is a Russian professional mixed martial artist. He is currently signed to the MMA promotion the Professional Fighters League (PFL) in the heavyweight division, where he is the PFL Heavyweight Champion. A professional since 2015, he previously competed in AMC Fight Nights, Absolute Championship Akhmat (ACA) and Bellator MMA.

== Professional mixed martial arts career ==
=== Early career ===
Bilostenniy started his professional MMA career in 2015 and mainly fought in Russian MMA promotions such as AMC Fight Nights and Absolute Championship Akhmat (ACA). He amassed a record of 10–2 prior to being signed by Bellator MMA. In one of them, Bilostenniy faced Mukhamad Vakhaev for the ACB Heavyweight Championship on 10 November 2018, losing by submission via rear-naked choke.

=== Bellator MMA ===
Making his Bellator debut, Bilostenniy faced Tyrell Fortune on 21 April 2023 at Bellator 294. He was disqualified in the first round after performing illegal blows to the back of Fortune's head.

Bilostenniy faced Kasim Aras on 23 September 2023, at Bellator 299. He won the bout by TKO in the first round.

=== Professional Fighters League ===
Bilostenniy debuted with the Professional Fighters League (PFL) and faced Blagoy Ivanov at PFL 1 on April 4, 2024. He won the bout by unanimous decision.

Ditcheva faced Tyrell Fortune at PFL 7 on August 2, 2024. He won the bout by submission in the first round.

On March 5, 2025, the promotion officially revealed that Bilostenniy joined the 2025 PFL Heavyweight Tournament.

In the quarterfinal, Bilostenniy faced Valentin Moldavsky on May 1, 2025, at PFL 4. He lost the fight by unanimous decision.

Bilostenniy faced Karl Williams on August 21, 2025, at PFL 10. He won the bout via technical knockout in the second round.

Bilostenniy faced Renan Ferreira on May 2, 2026, at PFL Sioux Falls. He won the fight via technical knockout in round three.

==== PFL Heavyweight Champion ====
Bilostenniy faced Vadim Nemkov for the PFL Heavyweight Championship on November 14, 2026, at PFL Returns to Dubai. He won the title by unanimous decision.

== Championships and accomplishments ==
- Professional Fighters League
  - PFL Heavyweight Championship (One time, current)

== Mixed martial arts record ==
Professional record breakdown
20 matches	16 wins	4 losses
By knockout	10	0
By submission	1	2
By decision	5	1
By disqualification	0	1

Res.	Record	Opponent	Method	Event	Date	Round	Time	Location	Notes
Win	16–4	Vadim Nemkov	Decision (unanimous)	PFL Dubai: Nemkov vs. Bilostenniy	November 14, 2026	5	5:00	Dubai, United Arab Emirates	Won the PFL Heavyweight Championship.
Win	15–4	Renan Ferreira	TKO (punches)	PFL Sioux Falls: Storley vs. Zendeli	May 2, 2026	3	1:56	Sioux Falls, South Dakota, United States	
Win	14–4	Karl Williams	TKO (punches)	PFL 10 (2025)	August 21, 2025	2	4:11	Hollywood, Florida, United States	
Loss	13–4	Valentin Moldavsky	Decision (unanimous)	PFL 4 (2025)	May 1, 2025	3	5:00	Orlando, Florida, United States	2025 PFL Heavyweight Tournament Quarterfinal.
Win	13–3	Tyrell Fortune	Submission (heel hook)	PFL 7 (2024)	August 2, 2024	1	2:00	Nashville, Tennessee, United States	
Win	12–3	Blagoy Ivanov	Decision (unanimous)	PFL 1 (2024)	April 4, 2024	3	5:00	San Antonio, Texas, United States	
Win	11–3	Kasim Aras	TKO (spinning wheel kick and punches)	Bellator 299	September 23, 2023	1	2:33	Dublin, Ireland	
Loss	10–3	Tyrell Fortune	DQ (punches to back of head)	Bellator 294	April 21, 2023	1	3:26	Honolulu, Hawaii, United States	
Win	10–2	Fernando Rodrigues Jr.	Decision (split)	RCC 11	May 6, 2022	3	5:00	Yekaterinburg, Russia	
Win	9–2	Caio Alencar	TKO (punches)	Open FC 15	December 19, 2021	1	2:23	Moscow, Russia	
Win	8–2	Roggers Souza	KO (punches)	Open FC 10	September 12, 2021	1	0:53	Moscow, Russia	
Win	7–2	Alex Sandry Modelli	TKO (upkick and punches)	Open FC 6	July 4, 2021	1	0:24	Krasnodar, Russia	
Win	6–2	Mark Godbeer	TKO (punches)	ACA 95	April 27, 2019	1	2:04	Moscow, Russia	
Loss	5–2	Mukhamad Vakhaev	Submission (rear-naked choke)	ACB 90	November 10, 2018	1	4:32	Moscow, Russia	For the ACB Heavyweight Championship.
Win	5–1	Amirkhan Isagadzhiev	KO (punches)	ACB 77	December 23, 2017	1	0:58	Moscow, Russia	Return to Heavyweight.
Win	4–1	Dmitriy Zabolotny	TKO (punches)	ACB 62	June 17, 2017	2	2:51	Rostov-on-Don, Russia	Light Heavyweight debut.
Loss	3–1	Mukhamad Vakhaev	Submission (rear-naked choke)	ACB 48	October 22, 2016	1	4:10	Moscow, Russia	
Win	3–0	Hanif Mirzamagomedov	Decision (unanimous)	ACB 32	March 26, 2016	3	5:00	Moscow, Russia	
Win	2–0	Amin Ergashev	Decision (unanimous)	League S-70: Plotforma Cup 2015	August 29, 2015	3	5:00	Sochi, Russia	
Win	1–0	Oleg Gapchenko	TKO (punches)	Fight Nights: Battle of Moscow 19	June 11, 2015	1	0:40	Moscow, Russia	Heavyweight debut.
