= Tyrell Fortune =

American professional mixed martial artist

- Fortune in 2014
- Born: July 4, 1990 (age 36); Portland, Oregon, U.S.
- Height: 6 ft 2 in (188 cm)
- Weight: 250 lb (113 kg; 17 st 12 lb)
- Division: Heavyweight
- Reach: 75 in (191 cm)
- Team: Arizona Combat Sports
- Years active: 2016–present (MMA)

Mixed martial arts record
- Total: 24
- Wins: 18
- By knockout: 11
- By submission: 1
- By decision: 5
- By disqualification: 1
- Losses: 4
- By knockout: 2
- By submission: 1
- By decision: 1
- No contests: 2

Other information
- University: Grand Canyon University
- Mixed martial arts record from Sherdog

Tyrell Fortune (born July 4, 1990) is an American professional mixed martial artist and former wrestler. He currently competes in the heavyweight division of the Ultimate Fighting Championship (UFC).

== Early life and wrestling career ==
Fortune was born on July 4, 1990, in Portland, Oregon. At age seven, he started wrestling at a local club in Portland. Fortune attended Parkrose High School before later transferring to Lakeridge High School, competing in wrestling and football in high school. During his junior season at Parkrose, he won the state Class 5A championship in his division, while, as a senior at Lakeridge, he won the Class 6A title. While in high school, Fortune won six national championships while competing as a member of Portland's Peninsula Wrestling Club. Competing in Greco-Roman and freestyle wrestling, he won two national titles in each event at the Cadet National Championships, and then won both titles at the 2008 Junior National Championships. Fortune was an eight-time All-American and ranked the top wrestling recruit nationally coming out of high school.

In 2009, Fortune represented the U.S. at the Junior World Championships. After high school, he enrolled at Clackamas Community College where he was a top wrestler. He competed there for two years and in both years won the Region 18 title and the National Junior College Athletic Association (NJCAA) title in his weight class. Fortune later entered Grand Canyon University in Phoenix, Arizona. He was named the NCAA Division II Wrestler of the Year as a junior after posting a record of 37–1 while winning the national title. Fortune left Grand Canyon short of graduating.

Fortune competed at the 2013 Summer Universiade in Kazan, Russia, winning a bronze medal in the 120 kg freestyle event while placing fifth in the Greco-Roman event. The following year, he won gold in the 125 kg event at the World University Wrestling Championships. He also competed at the 2014 Wrestling World Cup for the U.S. team. Fortune attempted to qualify for the 2016 Summer Olympics but narrowly missed out.

=== Weight-cutting incident ===
Fortune came close to death in 2012 during his wrestling career. A week before an event, Fortune found himself 26 pounds (12 kg) too heavy for the lower weight group, and so reduced his food intake to a bottle of water, a grain bar, and a cup of mandarin oranges. After finding himself one pound above the limit shortly before weigh-ins, he began running in an effort to lose the last pound, but collapsed from multiple organ failure and suffered multiple seizures over the next few hours including in the ambulance. He stated that he was briefly pronounced dead at the hospital, but managed to completely recover and continued his career.

== Mixed martial arts career ==
=== Bellator MMA ===
Fortune entered mixed martial arts and signed a contract with Bellator MMA in August 2015. He debuted at Bellator 163 on November 4, 2016. Competing as a heavyweight and aged 26 at the time of his debut, he won by technical knockout (TKO) in the first round of his fight against Cody Miskell. In 2017, he fought twice, winning by TKO once and by unanimous decision in the other. Fortune won two fights in 2018 and three in 2019, posting an eight-game winning-streak to begin his career, while six of his wins were finishes. On February 21, 2020, competing at Bellator 239, he was defeated for the first time in his career, being knocked out in the first round by a Timothy Johnson punch. After a Bellator 245 fight against Jack May was ruled no contest due to an accidental kick to the groin, Fortune won three straight fights, including two first-round TKOs, against May at Bellator 255 on April 2, 2021, and against Matt Mitrione at Bellator 262 on July 16, 2021.

Fortune trained at the Arizona Combat Sports club. At Bellator 271, on November 12, 2021, he lost by split decision to Linton Vassell. Following a first-round TKO against Rakim Cleveland on April 15, 2022, at Bellator 277, Fortune was number five in the Bellator heavyweight rankings. Fortune faced Daniel James on November 18, 2022, at Bellator 288, and initially was defeated before the match was overturned to no contest after James tested positive for an anabolic substance. On April 21, 2023, Fortune won against Sergey Bilostenniy at Bellator 294 after the latter was disqualified.

=== Professional Fighters League ===
Fortune later joined the Professional Fighters League (PFL), making his first appearance at PFL 4 on June 13, 2024, where he won by unanimous decision over Marcelo Golm. On August 2, 2024, he lost at PFL 7 by submission to Sergey Bilostenniy. Fortune later joined the Lights Out Xtreme Fighting (LXF) promotion, winning by TKO against Myron Dennis on May 10, 2025, at LXF 24, before competing under the Ringside United Fighting (RUF) promotion, winning a fight against Tony Lopez on August 16, 2025, by knockout. On September 20, 2025, at LXF 277, Fortune defeated Demoreo Dennis by TKO.

=== Ultimate Fighting Chammpionship ===
With two weeks' notice, Fortune agreed to fight Marcin Tybura at UFC Fight Night 271 on March 28, 2026, after the withdrawal of Tybura's original opponent. He won by unanimous decision, but announcer Bruce Buffer mistakenly announced Tybura as the winner. After Fortune "exited the octagon and headed toward the tunnel," he was told to return and was correctly announced as the victor.

Fortune was scheduled to face Rizvan Kuniev on June 27, 2026, at UFC Fight Night 280. However, for undisclosed reasons, the bout was moved to July 25, 2026 and took place at UFC Fight Night 282. Fortune lost the fight by technical knockout via knees in the third round. This fight earned him a $100,000 Fight of the Night award.

== Championships and accomplishments ==
=== Mixed martial arts ===
- Ultimate Fighting Championship
  - Fight of the Night (One time) vs. Rizvan Kuniev

== Mixed martial arts record ==
Professional record breakdown
24 matches	18 wins	4 losses
By knockout	11	2
By submission	1	1
By decision	5	1
By disqualification	1	0
No contests	2	

Res.	Record	Opponent	Method	Event	Date	Round	Time	Location	Notes
Loss	18–4 (2)	Rizvan Kuniev	TKO (knees)	UFC Fight Night: Ankalaev vs. Guskov	July 25, 2026	3	1:11	Abu Dhabi, United Arab Emirates	Fight of the Night.
Win	18–3 (2)	Marcin Tybura	Decision (unanimous)	UFC Fight Night: Adesanya vs. Pyfer	March 28, 2026	3	5:00	Seattle, Washington, United States	
Win	17–3 (2)	Demoreo Dennis	TKO (doctor stoppage)	Lights Out Xtreme Fighting 27	September 20, 2025	3	3:56	Long Beach, California, United States	
Win	16–3 (2)	Tony Lopez	KO (punch)	RUF 64	August 16, 2025	1	0:27	Phoenix, Arizona, United States	Won the vacant RUF MMA Heavyweight championship.
Win	15–3 (2)	Myron Dennis	TKO (punches)	Lights Out Xtreme Fighting 24	May 10, 2025	2	2:29	Long Beach, California, United States	Won the vacant LXF Heavyweight championship.
Loss	14–3 (2)	Sergey Bilostenniy	Submission (heel hook)	PFL 7 (2024)	August 2, 2024	1	2:00	Nashville, Tennessee, United States	2024 PFL Heavyweight Tournament Alternate bout.
Win	14–2 (2)	Marcelo Golm	Decision (unanimous)	PFL 4 (2024)	June 13, 2024	3	5:00	Uncasville, Connecticut, United States	
Win	13–2 (2)	Sergey Bilostenniy	DQ (punches to back of head)	Bellator 294	April 21, 2023	1	3:26	Honolulu, Hawaii, United States	
NC	12–2 (2)	Daniel James	NC (overturned)	Bellator 288	November 18, 2022	2	0:27	Chicago, Illinois, United States	Originally a TKO (punches and elbows) win for James; overturned after he tested positive for anabolic substance.
Win	12–2 (1)	Rakim Cleveland	TKO (punches and knee)	Bellator 277	April 15, 2022	1	1:38	San Jose, California, United States	
Loss	11–2 (1)	Linton Vassell	Decision (split)	Bellator 271	November 12, 2021	3	5:00	Hollywood, Florida, United States	
Win	11–1 (1)	Matt Mitrione	TKO (submission to punches)	Bellator 262	July 16, 2021	1	1:45	Uncasville, Connecticut, United States	
Win	10–1 (1)	Jack May	TKO (punches)	Bellator 255	April 2, 2021	1	3:16	Uncasville, Connecticut, United States	
Win	9–1 (1)	Said Sowma	Decision (unanimous)	Bellator 251	November 5, 2020	3	5:00	Uncasville, Connecticut, United States	
NC	8–1 (1)	Jack May	NC (accidental knee to groin)	Bellator 245	September 11, 2020	1	2:42	Uncasville, Connecticut, United States	Accidental knee to the groin rendered May unable to continue.
Loss	8–1	Tim Johnson	KO (punch)	Bellator 239	February 21, 2020	1	2:35	Thackerville, Oklahoma, United States	
Win	8–0	Azunna Anyanwu	TKO (punches)	Bellator 233	November 8, 2019	2	1:56	Thackerville, Oklahoma, United States	
Win	7–0	Rudy Schaffroth	Submission (rear-naked choke)	Bellator 225	August 24, 2019	2	2:08	Bridgeport, Connecticut, United States	
Win	6–0	Ryan Pokryfky	TKO (punches)	Bellator 216	February 16, 2019	1	2:21	Uncasville, Connecticut, United States	
Win	5–0	Giovanni Sarran	TKO (punches)	Bellator 201	June 29, 2018	2	4:35	Temecula, California, United States	
Win	4–0	Joe Hernandez	Decision (unanimous)	Bellator 193	January 26, 2018	3	5:00	Temecula, California, United States	
Win	3–0	Branko Busick	Decision (unanimous)	Bellator 178	April 21, 2017	3	5:00	Uncasville, Connecticut, United States	
Win	2–0	Will Johnson	TKO (punches)	Bellator 171	January 27, 2017	2	4:27	Mulvane, Kansas, United States	
Win	1–0	Cody Miskell	TKO (punches)	Bellator 163	November 4, 2016	1	2:22	Uncasville, Connecticut, United States	Heavyweight debut.

== See also ==
- List of current UFC fighters
- List of male mixed martial artists
