= Oleg Popov (fighter) =

Russian mixed martial artist (born 1992)

- Born: 10 January 1992 (age 34); Yashaltinsky District, Kalmykia, Russia
- Height: 6 ft 1 in (1.85 m)
- Weight: 248 lb (112 kg; 17.7 st)
- Division: Heavyweight
- Fighting out of: Krasnodar, Russia
- Team: FedorTeam
- Rank: Master of Sports in ARB
- Years active: 2015–present

Mixed martial arts record
- Total: 26
- Wins: 24
- By knockout: 9
- By submission: 3
- By decision: 12
- Losses: 2
- By submission: 1
- By decision: 1

Other information
- Mixed martial arts record from Sherdog

Oleg Popov (Russian: Олег Сергеевич Попов; born 10 January 1992) is a Russian professional mixed martial artist. He is currently signed to the MMA promotion the Professional Fighters League (PFL) in the heavyweight division, where he was the 2025 PFL Heavyweight Tournament Champion. A professional mixed martial arts competitor since 2015, he has previously fought in AMC Fight Nights and Bellator MMA. As of March 26, 2026, he is #1 in the PFL heavyweight rankings.

== Background ==
Prior to his professional MMA career, Popov was champion of the Southern Military District in ARB, won the Armed Forces Cup in ARB and was awarded Master of Sports of Russia in ARB.

== Mixed martial arts career ==
=== Early career ===
Popov started his professional MMA career in 2015 and mainly fought in Russia, particularly AMC Fight Nights and the MMA Series, the latter in where he won the heavyweight title. He amassed a record of 15–1 prior to being signed by Bellator MMA.

In his last bout before Bellator, Popov faced Antônio Silva at MMA Series 53 on June 24, 2022. He won the bout by knockout 15 seconds into the 2nd round.

=== Bellator ===
Popov faced Gökhan Saricam on February 25, 2023, at Bellator 291. He won the bout by unanimous decision.

=== Professional Fighters League ===
==== 2024 season ====
Popov debuted with the Professional Fighters League (PFL) at PFL 1 on April 4, 2024, and won his bout against Steve Mowry by TKO in the second round.

Popov faced Davion Franklin at PFL 4 on June 13, 2024. He won the bout by unanimous decision.

Popov was scheduled to face Valentin Moldavsky in the semifinals of the 2024 Heavyweight tournament at PFL 7 on August 2, 2024, however Moldavsky was forced to withdraw due to injury and was replaced by Linton Vassell. Popov won the bout via unanimous decision.

Popov faced Denis Goltsov in the finals of the 2024 Heavyweight tournament at PFL 10 on November 29, 2024, and lost the fight via a triangle choke submission in the first round.

==== 2025 Tournament ====
On March 5, 2025, the promotion officially revealed that Popov joined the 2025 PFL Heavyweight Tournament.

In the quarterfinal, Popov was scheduled to face Linton Vassell in a rematch on May 1, 2025, at PFL 4. However, on April 28, it was announced Vassell has pulled out of the bout and was replaced by Karl Williams. He won the fight by split decision.

In the semifinals, Popov faced Rodrigo Nascimento at PFL 7 on June 27, 2025. He won the fight via unanimous decision.

In the final, Popov faced Alexander Romanov at PFL 10, on August 21, 2025. He won the fight via split decision.

==== 2026 ====
In his bout outside PFL, Popov faced Magomed Magomedov on March 28, 2026, at "BetCity Fight Nights 135". He won the fight via unanimous decision.

Popov faced Pouya Rahmani on November 14, 2026, at PFL Returns to Dubai. He won the fight via unanimous decision.

== Championships and accomplishments ==
=== Mixed martial arts ===
- Professional Fighters League
  - 2025 PFL Heavyweight Tournament Champion
- MMA Series
  - MMA Series Heavyweight Championship (One time)

== Mixed martial arts record ==
Professional record breakdown
26 matches	24 wins	2 losses
By knockout	9	0
By submission	3	1
By decision	12	1

Res.	Record	Opponent	Method	Event	Date	Round	Time	Location	Notes
Win	24–2	Pouya Rahmani	Decision (unanimous)	PFL Dubai: Nemkov vs. Bilostenniy	November 14, 2026	3	5:00	Dubai, United Arab Emirates	
Win	23–2	Magomed Magomedov	Decision (unanimous)	BetCity Fight Nights 135	March 28, 2026	3	5:00	Elista, Russia	
Win	22–2	Alexander Romanov	Decision (split)	PFL 10 (2025)	August 21, 2025	5	5:00	Hollywood, Florida, United States	Won the 2025 PFL Heavyweight Tournament.
Win	21–2	Rodrigo Nascimento	Decision (unanimous)	PFL 7 (2025)	June 27, 2025	3	5:00	Chicago, Illinois, United States	2025 PFL Heavyweight Tournament Semifinal.
Win	20–2	Karl Williams	Decision (split)	PFL 4 (2025)	May 1, 2025	3	5:00	Orlando, Florida, United States	2025 PFL Heavyweight Tournament Quarterfinal.
Loss	19–2	Denis Goltsov	Technical Submission (triangle choke)	PFL 10 (2024)	November 29, 2024	1	2:55	Riyadh, Saudi Arabia	2024 PFL Heavyweight Tournament Final.
Win	19–1	Linton Vassell	Decision (unanimous)	PFL 7 (2024)	August 2, 2024	3	5:00	Nashville, Tennessee, United States	2024 PFL Heavyweight Tournament Semifinal.
Win	18–1	Davion Franklin	Decision (unanimous)	PFL 4 (2024)	June 13, 2024	3	5:00	Uncasville, Connecticut, United States	Catchweight (268.5 lb) bout; Franklin missed weight.
Win	17–1	Steve Mowry	TKO (punches)	PFL 1 (2024)	April 4, 2024	2	3:47	San Antonio, Texas, United States	
Win	16–1	Gökhan Saricam	Decision (unanimous)	Bellator 291	February 25, 2023	3	5:00	Dublin, Ireland	
Win	15–1	Antônio Silva	KO (punch)	MMA Series 53	June 24, 2022	2	0:15	Moscow, Russia	
Win	14–1	Alejandro Solorzano	TKO (corner stoppage)	MMA Series 43	October 30, 2021	2	N/A	Moscow, Russia	
Win	13–1	Marcos Brigagão	Submission (triangle choke)	Blacksmith FC 3	September 25, 2021	3	2:10	Anapa, Russia	
Win	12–1	Fernando Batista	TKO (punches)	Open FC 6	July 4, 2021	2	2:46	Krasnodar, Russia	
Win	11–1	Fayoz Shomurodov	Submission (armbar)	MMA Series 33	May 29, 2021	1	1:39	Rublyovka, Russia	Won the vacant MMA Series Heavyweight Championship.
Win	10–1	Abdul Elwahab Saeed	KO (punches)	MMA Series 26	February 20, 2021	5	5:00	Voronezh, Russia	
Win	9–1	Sergey Alekseevich	Submission (triangle choke)	MMA Series 7	November 21, 2020	2	3:13	Sochi, Russia	
Win	8–1	Magomedbag Agaev	Decision (unanimous)	Fight Nights Global 97	September 18, 2020	3	5:00	Elista, Russia	
Win	7–1	Denis Arkhireev	TKO (punches)	MMA Series 7	June 20, 2020	1	5:00	Taganrog, Russia	
Win	6–1	Gerônimo dos Santos	TKO (punches)	League S-70: Plotforma Cup 2019	August 14, 2019	2	1:49	Sochi, Russia	
Win	5–1	Alexander Soldatkin	Decision (unanimous)	Samara MMA Federation: Battle on Volga 10	April 14, 2019	3	5:00	Tolyatti, Russia	
Win	4–1	Yuriy Fedorov	TKO (punches)	M-1 Challenge 98	November 2, 2018	2	2:38	Chelyabinsk, Russia	
Win	3–1	Adam Bogatyrev	Decision (unanimous)	M-1 Challenge 95	July 21, 2018	3	5:00	Nazran, Russia	
Loss	2–1	Yusup Suliemanov	Decision (unanimous)	Fight Nights Global 54	November 16, 2016	3	5:00	Rostov-on-Don, Russia	Catchweight (220 lb) bout.
Win	2–0	Timofey Mishev	Decision (unanimous)	Fight Nights Global 48	May 26, 2016	3	5:00	Moscow, Russia	
Win	1–0	Anton Vyazigin	KO (punches)	Fight Nights Global 42	October 23, 2015	1	2:56	Saint Petersburg, Russia	Heavyweight debut.

== See also ==
- List of current PFL fighters
- List of male mixed martial artists
