= Russian National Freestyle 2016 – Men's freestyle 125 kg =

The men's freestyle 125 kg is a competition featured at the 2016 Russian National Freestyle Wrestling Championships, and was held in Yakutsk, Russia on May 28.

== Medalists ==
Gold	(Krasnoyarsk Krai) Mukhambazi Magomedov
Silver	(Chechnya) Bekhan Dukaev
Bronze	(Saint Petersburg) Anzor Khizriev
Bronze	(Buryatia) Baldan Tsyzhipov

== Results ==
Legend

- F — Won by fall
- WO — Won by walkover

=== Finals ===
Final
(Chechnya) Bekhan Dukaev	4
(Krasnoyarsk Krai) Mukhambazi Magomedov	8

=== Top half ===
Round of 32
(North Ossetia–Alania) Soslan Khinchagov
(North Ossetia–Alania) Atsamaz Gazaev	WO

Round of 16
(Khabarovsk Krai) Ruslan Aliev	WO
(Dagestan) Nimatullah Abdurakhmanov
(Chechnya) Bekhan Dukaev	WO
(Kabardino-Balkaria) Muradin Kushkhov
(Saint Petersburg) Anzor Khizriev	6
(Ingushetia) Adam Daurbekov	2
(Khanty-Mansi Autonomous Okrug) Kazbek Khubulov	2
(North Ossetia–Alania) Atsamaz Gazaev	4

Quarterfinals
(Khabarovsk Krai) Ruslan Aliev	2
(Chechnya) Bekhan Dukaev	12
(Saint Petersburg) Anzor Khizriev	6^{F}
(North Ossetia–Alania) Atsamaz Gazaev	0

Semifinals
(Chechnya) Bekhan Dukaev	3
(Saint Petersburg) Anzor Khizriev	1

=== Bottom half ===
Round of 32
(Moscow Oblast) Abas Abdulalev	WO
(Arkhangelsk Oblast) Aleksey Shilin
(Moscow Oblast) Edward Kodolaev	WO
(Saint Petersburg) Zelimkhan Khizriev
(Kemerovo Oblast) Ostap Pasenok
(Krasnoyarsk Krai) Mukhambazi Magomedov	WO
(Buryatia) Tsybik Maksarov
(North Ossetia–Alania) Vitaly Goloev	WO
(Buryatia) Baldan Tsyzhipov	WO
(North Ossetia–Alania) Alan Khugaev
(Khanty-Mansi Autonomous Okrug) Zaur Kozonov	WO
(Kalmykia) Boris Mudzhikov
(Moscow Oblast) Pavel Krivtsov
(North Ossetia–Alania) Eduard Bazrov	WO
(Dagestan) Asadullah Ibragimov	—
(Kabardino-Balkaria) Bilyal Makhov	—

Round of 16
(Moscow Oblast) Abas Abdulalev	3
(Moscow Oblast) Edward Kodolaev	9
(Krasnoyarsk Krai) Mukhambazi Magomedov	8
(North Ossetia–Alania) Vitaly Goloev	2
(Buryatia) Baldan Tsyzhipov	7
(Khanty-Mansi Autonomous Okrug) Zaur Kozonov	1
(North Ossetia–Alania) Eduard Bazrov	WO
-

Quarterfinals
(Moscow Oblast) Edward Kodolaev	1
(Krasnoyarsk Krai) Mukhambazi Magomedov	5
(Buryatia) Baldan Tsyzhipov	WO
(North Ossetia–Alania) Eduard Bazrov

Semifinals
(Krasnoyarsk Krai) Mukhambazi Magomedov	2
(Buryatia) Baldan Tsyzhipov	2

=== Repechage ===
Repechage round 1
(Kemerovo Oblast) Ostap Pasenok	6
(North Ossetia–Alania) Vitaly Goloev	3

Repechage round 2
(Kabardino-Balkaria) Muradin Kushkhov
(Khabarovsk Krai) Ruslan Aliev	WO
(Kemerovo Oblast) Ostap Pasenok	5
(Moscow Oblast) Edward Kodolaev	2

Bronze medals
(Khabarovsk Krai) Ruslan Aliev	2
(Saint Petersburg) Anzor Khizriev	4^{F}
(Kemerovo Oblast) Ostap Pasenok	1
(Buryatia) Baldan Tsyzhipov	3
