= Alexander Romanov (fighter) =

Moldovan wrestler and mixed martial artist (born 1990)

Alexandr Romanov
- Born: December 11, 1990 (age 35); Comrat, SSR Moldova, Soviet Union
- Other names: King Kong
- Height: 6 ft 2 in (1.88 m)
- Weight: 265 lb (120 kg; 18 st 13 lb)
- Division: Heavyweight
- Reach: 75 in (191 cm)
- Style: Wrestling
- Fighting out of: Comrat, Moldova
- Team: Rising Tide Academy
- Rank: Black belt in BJJ, under Mike Stewart.
- Wrestling: Olympic Freestyle Wrestling
- Years active: 2016–present (MMA); 2007–present (freestyle wrestling)

Mixed martial arts record
- Total: 27
- Wins: 22
- By knockout: 6
- By submission: 13
- By decision: 3
- Losses: 4
- By knockout: 1
- By submission: 1
- By decision: 2
- No contests: 1

Other information
- University: Comrat State University
- Mixed martial arts record from Sherdog

Alexandr Romanov (born December 11, 1990) is a Moldovan professional mixed martial artist and freestyle wrestler who competes in the Heavyweight division. He has also fought in the Ultimate Fighting Championship (UFC) and the Professional Fighters League (PFL). As of April 21, 2026, he is #5 in the PFL heavyweight rankings.

He currently competes in the Heavyweight division of Real American Freestyle (RAF).

== Wrestling career ==
Romanov started training in freestyle wrestling at age seven. He has made four Moldovan World Teams (two as a senior and two as a junior) and eight European Teams (five as a senior, three as an age-group wrestler). His best result has been a bronze medal at the 2016 World University Championships. His last performance to date took place at the 2020 European Wrestling Championships, where he placed twelfth. He is also a two-time UWW grappling European bronze medalist.

Romanov studied at law faculty of Comrat State University and pedagogical faculty of Chișinău Sport Institute.

Alexandr Romanov also competed in sumo for a brief time. While his time in the sport was not long, he won silver in the OPEN European Cup in 2016.

Romanov debuted for Real American Freestyle at RAF 02 on October 25, 2025, losing to Mason Parris. He will headline RAF 09 against Gable Steveson on May 30, 2026.

== Mixed martial arts career ==
=== Early career ===
Early in his career after his stint in wrestling, Romanov found Chelsea Edward, a Muay Thai coach. Edward brought Romanov into the sport of MMA and remains his coach to this day.

Romanov compiled a record of 11 wins and no losses while competing in his native Moldova, primarily at Eagles Fighting Championship, where he became the heavyweight champion.

=== Ultimate Fighting Championship ===
Romanov signed with the UFC on October 3, 2019, and was later scheduled to make his debut against Raphael Pessoa on April 25, 2020. However, the event was subsequently cancelled due to the COVID-19 pandemic.

Romanov was then slated to face Marcin Tybura on July 12, 2020, at UFC 251. However, Romanov was removed from the card on July 1, due to a positive COVID-19 test. He was then scheduled to face Marcos Rogério de Lima on September 5, 2020, at UFC Fight Night: Overeem vs. Sakai, but the bout was scratched the day of the event when Lima tested positive for COVID-19.

Romanov eventually made his debut on September 12, 2020, at UFC Fight Night: Waterson vs. Hill, when he defeated Roque Martinez via arm-triangle choke in the second round.

Next, he faced Marcos Rogério de Lima on November 7, 2020, at UFC on ESPN: Santos vs. Teixeira. He defeated Lima with the first forearm choke in UFC history, on the first round, to claim Performance of the Night honors.

Romanov faced Juan Espino on April 17, 2021, at UFC on ESPN: Whittaker vs. Gastelum. During the beginning of the third round, Espino accidentally connected with a knee to the groin of Romanov, who could not continue. Romanov was declared the winner via technical split decision. 6 out of 8 media scores gave it to Espino, with the other two declaring it a Draw.

Romanov faced Jared Vanderaa on October 9, 2021, at UFC Fight Night: Dern vs. Rodriguez. He won the fight via technical knockout in round two.

Romanov was next expected to face Ilir Latifi at UFC Fight Night 202 on February 19, 2022. However, the bout was cancelled for undisclosed reasons.

Replacing Rodrigo Nascimento, Romanov is scheduled to face Tanner Boser on April 23, 2022, at UFC Fight Night 205. However, on April 18, it was announced that Boser was out of the fight due to an injury. He was replaced by Chase Sherman. However, Sherman was deemed unable to compete due to a minor health issue on the day of the event and the fight was cancelled and the pair was rescheduled for UFC on ESPN 35. Romanov won the bout via keylock submission in the first round.

Romanov faced Marcin Tybura on August 20, 2022, at UFC 278. Romanov lost the fight via a controversial majority decision. 17 of 18 MMA media outlets scored the bout as a draw.

Romanov faced Alexander Volkov on March 11, 2023, at UFC Fight Night 221. He lost the fight via technical knockout in the first round.

Romanov faced Blagoy Ivanov at UFC on ESPN 48 on 1 July 2023. He won the fight by unanimous decision.

Romanov faced Jailton Almeida on June 1, 2024, at UFC 302. He lost in the first round via rear-naked choke in his first submission loss.

Romanov was originally scheduled to face former UFC Heavyweight Championship challenger Derrick Lewis on November 2, 2024, at UFC Fight Night 246. However, opponents were changed and Romanov instead faced Rodrigo Nascimento. He won the fight by unanimous decision.

Despite having a recent win, on November 5, 2024, it was reported that Romanov's contract was not renewed, so he was removed from the UFC roster as a result.

=== Professional Fighters League ===
On January 27, 2025, Romanov reported at Instagram account that he signed with Professional Fighters League. On March 5, 2025, the promotion officially revealed that Romanov will join the 2025 PFL Heavyweight Tournament.

In the quarterfinal, Romanov faced Timothy Johnson on May 1, 2025, at PFL 4. He won the fight via a guillotine choke submission in the first round.

In the semifinals, Romanov faced Valentin Moldavsky at PFL 7 on June 27, 2025. The bout ended in a no contest after Moldavsky accidentally hit Romanov with a groin strike and he was unable to continue. Per the decision of the judges, Romanov advanced to the tournament final.

In the final, Romanov faced Oleg Popov at PFL 10, on August 21, 2025. He lost the fight via split decision.

Romanov faced Rodrigo Nascimento in a rematch at PFL Chicago: Pettis vs. McKee, on April 11, 2026. He won the bout via submission in the second round.

== Professional grappling career ==
Romanov competed against Chris Daukaus at Fury Pro Grappling 8 on December 30, 2023. Romanov won the match by decision.

Romanov faced Roosevelt Sousa at Pit Submission Series 7 on July 25, 2024. He lost the match by submission.

Romanov competed against Dymere Rappa in the main event of Fury Pro Grappling 12 on December 28, 2024. He won the match by submission with a north south choke.

== Personal life ==
Romanov was born to a Russian father and Ukrainian mother and raised in Moldova. He and his wife have three children. He trains with Adeboy Kechin.

== Championships and accomplishments ==
=== Mixed martial arts ===
- Ultimate Fighting Championship
  - Performance of the Night (One time) vs. Marcos Rogério de Lima
- Eagles Fighting Championship
  - Eagles FC Heavyweight Championship (One time)
- Shogun Fights
  - Shogun Fights Heavyweight Championship (One time)

== Mixed martial arts record ==
Professional record breakdown
27 matches	22 wins	4 losses
By knockout	6	1
By submission	13	1
By decision	3	2
No contests	1	

Res.	Record	Opponent	Method	Event	Date	Round	Time	Location	Notes
Win	22–4 (1)	Rodrigo Nascimento	Submission (guillotine choke)	PFL Chicago: Pettis vs. McKee	April 11, 2026	2	3:10	Chicago, Illinois, United States	
Win	21–4 (1)	Jared Vanderaa	Submission (rear-naked choke)	Shogun Fights 32	March 28, 2026	1	1:30	Hanover, Maryland, United States	Won the vacant Shogun Fights Heavyweight Championship.
Win	20–4 (1)	Cameron Graham	Submission (rear-naked choke)	Shogun Fights 31	November 15, 2025	1	4:03	Hanover, Maryland, United States	
Loss	19–4 (1)	Oleg Popov	Decision (split)	PFL 10 (2025)	August 21, 2025	5	5:00	Hollywood, Florida, United States	2025 PFL Heavyweight Tournament Final.
NC	19–3 (1)	Valentin Moldavsky	NC (accidental knee to groin)	PFL 7 (2025)	June 27, 2025	1	4:26	Chicago, Illinois, United States	2025 PFL Heavyweight Tournament Semifinal. Accidental knee to the groin rendered Romanov unable to continue.
Win	19–3	Timothy Johnson	Submission (guillotine choke)	PFL 4 (2025)	May 1, 2025	1	1:53	Orlando, Florida, United States	2025 PFL Heavyweight Tournament Quarterfinal.
Win	18–3	Rodrigo Nascimento	Decision (unanimous)	UFC Fight Night: Moreno vs. Albazi	November 2, 2024	3	5:00	Edmonton, Alberta, Canada	
Loss	17–3	Jailton Almeida	Submission (rear-naked choke)	UFC 302	June 1, 2024	1	2:27	Newark, New Jersey, United States	
Win	17–2	Blagoy Ivanov	Decision (unanimous)	UFC on ESPN: Strickland vs. Magomedov	July 1, 2023	3	5:00	Las Vegas, Nevada, United States	
Loss	16–2	Alexander Volkov	TKO (punches)	UFC Fight Night: Yan vs. Dvalishvili	March 11, 2023	1	2:16	Las Vegas, Nevada, United States	
Loss	16–1	Marcin Tybura	Decision (majority)	UFC 278	August 20, 2022	3	5:00	Salt Lake City, Utah, United States	
Win	16–0	Chase Sherman	Submission (keylock)	UFC on ESPN: Font vs. Vera	April 30, 2022	1	2:11	Las Vegas, Nevada, United States	
Win	15–0	Jared Vanderaa	TKO (punches)	UFC Fight Night: Dern vs. Rodriguez	October 9, 2021	2	4:43	Las Vegas, Nevada, United States	
Win	14–0	Juan Espino	Technical Decision (split)	UFC on ESPN: Whittaker vs. Gastelum	April 17, 2021	3	1:05	Las Vegas, Nevada, United States	Accidental knee to the groin rendered Romanov unable to continue.
Win	13–0	Marcos Rogério de Lima	Technical Submission (forearm choke)	UFC on ESPN: Santos vs. Teixeira	November 7, 2020	1	4:48	Las Vegas, Nevada, United States	Performance of the Night.
Win	12–0	Roque Martinez	Submission (arm-triangle choke)	UFC Fight Night: Waterson vs. Hill	September 12, 2020	2	4:22	Las Vegas, Nevada, United States	
Win	11–0	Sérgio Freitas	TKO (submission to injury)	Eagles FC 11	February 16, 2019	1	2:28	Chișinău, Moldova	
Win	10–0	Sultan Murtazaliev	TKO (punches)	Eagles FC 10	November 3, 2018	3	2:17	Chișinău, Moldova	
Win	9–0	Virgil Zwicker	Submission (neck crank)	League S-70: Plotforma Cup 2018	August 22, 2018	1	1:15	Sochi, Russia	
Win	8–0	Ion Grigore	Submission (forearm choke)	Eagles FC 9	May 26, 2018	1	3:54	Chișinău, Moldova	Openweight bout.
Win	7–0	Alexander Stolyarov	TKO (punches)	Eagles FC 8	February 10, 2018	1	0:36	Chișinău, Moldova	Won the EFC Heavyweight Championship.
Win	6–0	Ravshankhon Khusanov	TKO (punches)	Eagles FC 7	November 4, 2017	1	1:37	Chișinău, Moldova	
Win	5–0	Yuri Gorbenko	Submission (forearm choke)	Eagles FC 6	June 24, 2017	1	3:43	Chișinău, Moldova	
Win	4–0	Evgeniy Golub	TKO (punches)	Eagles FC 5	May 20, 2017	1	0:48	Chișinău, Moldova	
Win	3–0	Shota Betlemidze	Submission (rear-naked choke)	ProFC Ukraine: Brave Hearts	April 8, 2017	1	4:56	Nikolaev, Ukraine	
Win	2–0	Andrey Burdiniuk	Submission (neck crank)	Eagles FC 4	February 18, 2017	3	0:43	Chișinău, Moldova	
Win	1–0	Yuriy Protsenko	Submission (rear-naked choke)	Eagles FC 3	November 19, 2016	1	0:50	Chișinău, Moldova	Heavyweight debut.

== See also ==
- List of male mixed martial artists
