= PFL 4 (2025) =

Professional Fighters League MMA event in 2025

- The poster for PFL 4
- Promotion: Professional Fighters League
- Date: May 1, 2025
- Venue: Universal Studios Florida
- City: Orlando, Florida, United States

Event chronology
PFL 3	PFL 4	PFL MENA 1

The PFL 4 mixed martial arts event for the 2025 season of the Professional Fighters League was held on May 1, 2025, at the Universal Studios Florida in Orlando, Florida, United States. This event marked the quarterfinal of the single-elimination tournament format in the Light Heavyweight and Heavyweight divisions.

== Background ==
The event featured the quarterfinal of 2025 PFL World Tournament in a light heavyweight and heavyweight divisions.

Linton Vassell was scheduled to face Oleg Popov in a heavyweight tournament bout at this event. However, on April 28, it was announced he has pulled out of the bout and was replaced by Karl Williams.

Before event started, the promotion announced the matchup between Sullivan Cauley and Marcelo Nunes was changed with Nunes withdrawing from the bout and being replaced by former LFA Heavyweight Champion Alex Polizzi.

== Fight card ==
Main card (ESPN2 / ESPN+)
Weight class				Method	Round	Time	Notes
Light Heavyweight	Phil Davis	def.	Rob Wilkinson	TKO (punches)	2	0:51	(Note: 2025 PFL Light Heavyweight Tournament Quarterfinal.)
Heavyweight	Valentin Moldavsky	def.	Sergey Bilostenniy	Decision (unanimous) (29–28, 29–28, 29–28)	3	5:00	(Note: 2025 PFL Heavyweight Tournament Quarterfinal.)
Light Heavyweight	Antônio Carlos Júnior	def.	Karl Moore	Decision (split) (29–28, 28–29, 29–28)	3	5:00	(Note: 2025 PFL Light Heavyweight Tournament Quarterfinal.)
Light Heavyweight	Simeon Powell	def.	Karl Albrektsson	TKO (elbows and punches)	2	2:05	(Note: 2025 PFL Light Heavyweight Tournament Quarterfinal.)
Preliminary card (ESPN+)
Heavyweight	Alexander Romanov	def.	Timothy Johnson	Submission (guillotine choke)	1	1:53	(Note: 2025 PFL Heavyweight Tournament Quarterfinal.)
Heavyweight	Oleg Popov	def.	Karl Williams	Decision (split) (28–29, 29–28, 29–28)	3	5:00	(Note: 2025 PFL Heavyweight Tournament Quarterfinal.)
Light Heavyweight	Sullivan Cauley	def.	Alex Polizzi	TKO (elbows and punches)	1	1:36	(Note: 2025 PFL Light Heavyweight Tournament Quarterfinal.)
Heavyweight	Rodrigo Nascimento	def.	Abraham Bably	Decision (split) (28–29, 29–28, 29–28)	3	5:00	(Note: 2025 PFL Heavyweight Tournament Quarterfinal.)

== Tournament brackets ==
=== 2025 PFL Heavyweight Tournament ===
Quarter-finals
(Russia) Valentin Moldavsky	UD
(Russia) Sergey Bilostenniy	3
(Moldova) Alexander Romanov	SUB
(United States) Timothy Johnson	1
(England) Abraham Bably	3
(Brazil) Rodrigo Nascimento (Note: Pouya Rahmani withdrew from the tournament due to visa issues and was replaced by Rodrigo Nascimento.)	SD
(Russia) Oleg Popov	SD
(United States Virgin Islands) Karl Williams (Note: Linton Vassell withdrew from the tournament and was replaced by Karl Williams.)	3

Semi-finals
(Russia) Valentin Moldavsky
(Moldova) Alexander Romanov
(Brazil) Rodrigo Nascimento
(Russia) Oleg Popov

Final

=== 2025 PFL Light Heavyweight Tournament ===
Quarter-finals
(United States) Phil Davis	TKO
(Australia) Rob Wilkinson	2
(United States) Alex Polizzi (Note: Marcelo Nunes withdrew from the tournament before event started and was replaced by Alex Polizzi.)	1
(United States) Sullivan Cauley	TKO
(Republic of Ireland) Karl Moore	3
(Brazil) Antônio Carlos Júnior	SD
(Sweden) Karl Albrektsson	2
(England) Simeon Powell	TKO

Semi-finals
(United States) Phil Davis
(United States) Sullivan Cauley
(Brazil) Antônio Carlos Júnior
(England) Simeon Powell

Final

== See also ==
- 2025 in Professional Fighters League
- List of PFL events
- List of current PFL fighters
