= Bellator 285 =

MMA event

Bellator 285: Henderson vs. Queally
- The poster for Bellator 285: Henderson vs. Queally
- Promotion: Bellator MMA
- Date: September 23, 2022
- Venue: 3Arena
- City: Dublin, Ireland

Event chronology
Bellator 284: Gracie vs. Yamauchi	Bellator 285: Henderson vs. Queally	Bellator 286: Pitbull vs. Borics

Bellator 285: Henderson vs. Queally was a mixed martial arts event produced by Bellator MMA, that took place on 23 September 2022 at the 3Arena in Dublin, Ireland.

== Background ==
The event marked the promotion's eighth visit to Dublin and first since Bellator 275 in February 2022.

A lightweight bout between former WEC and UFC Lightweight Champion Benson Henderson and Peter Queally headlined the event.

After initially being booked for May 6, 2022 at Bellator 280 and being scrapped due to a hand injury to Manhoef, Yoel Romero and Melvin Manhoef was rescheduled for this event.

A bantamweight bout between Brett Johns and James Gallagher was scheduled for this event. However in August, it was announced that Gallagher pulled out of the bout for unknown reasons. Jordan Winski was picked as a replacement for Gallagher.

== Results ==
Main Card (Showtime)
Weight class				Method	Round	Time	Notes
Lightweight	Benson Henderson	def.	Peter Queally	Decision (unanimous) (49–45, 49–45, 49–45)	5	5:00	(Note: Henderson was deducted 1 point in Round 2 for a low blow.)
Light Heavyweight	Yoel Romero	def.	Melvin Manhoef	KO (elbows)	3	3:34
Women's Featherweight	Leah McCourt	def.	Dayana Silva	Decision (unanimous) (30–27, 29–28, 29–28)	3	5:00
Featherweight	Pedro Carvalho	def.	Mads Burnell	Decision (unanimous) (30–27, 29–28, 29–28)	3	5:00
Catchweight (150 lbs)	Ciaran Clarke	def.	Rafael Hudson	Submission (rear-naked choke)	3	2:50
Light Heavyweight	Karl Moore	def.	Karl Albrektsson	Submission (face crank)	2	3:36
Preliminary card (Youtube/Pluto TV)
Bantamweight	Brian Moore	def.	Arivaldo Silva	Decision (unanimous) (30–27, 30–27, 30–27)	3	5:00
Bantamweight	Brett Johns	def.	Jordan Winski	Decision (unanimous) (30–27, 30–26, 30–26)	3	5:00
Lightweight	Darragh Kelly	def.	Kye Stevens	Decision (unanimous) (30–27, 30–26, 30–26)	3	5:00
Lightweight	Kane Mousah	def.	Georgi Karakhanyan	Decision (unanimous) (30–27, 30–27, 30–27)	3	5:00
Featherweight	Kenny Mokhonoana	def.	Alex Bodnar	Technical Submission (guillotine choke)	1	2:42
Featherweight	Asaël Adjoudj	def.	Jordan Barton	TKO (head kick and punches)	1	2:39
Welterweight	Luca Poclit	def.	Dante Shiro	Technical Submission (reverse arm-triangle choke)	2	4:27

== See also ==
- 2022 in Bellator MMA
- List of Bellator MMA events
- List of current Bellator fighters
