= Sullivan Cauley =

American mixed martial artist (born 1996)

- Born: Sullivan Troy Cauley; May 15, 1996 (age 30); Scottsdale, Arizona, U.S.
- Other names: Sully
- Height: 6 ft 3 in (191 cm)
- Weight: 205 lb (93 kg; 14 st 9 lb)
- Division: Light heavyweight
- Reach: 74.5 in (189 cm)
- Style: Freestyle wrestling Muay Thai
- Fighting out of: Mesa, Arizona, U.S.
- Team: Dan's Gym
- Years active: 2020–present

Mixed martial arts record
- Total: 11
- Wins: 8
- By knockout: 6
- By submission: 1
- By decision: 1
- Losses: 3
- By submission: 2
- By decision: 1

Other information
- Mixed martial arts record from Sherdog

Sullivan Troy Cauley (born May 15, 1996) is an American professional mixed martial artist. He currently competes in the light heavyweight division of the Professional Fighters League (PFL). A professional since 2020, Cauley has previously also fought in Bellator MMA. As of August 21, 2026, he is #7 in the PFL light heavyweight rankings.

== Background ==
Born in Scottsdale, Arizona, Cauley attended Reno High School and started competing on the school's wrestling team in tenth grade. He also attended Arizona State University, where he was a member of the Sun Devils wrestling team.

Cauley won the silver medal in the +91 kg division in the U-23 category of the 2019 IFMA World Muaythai Championships.

== Professional mixed martial arts career ==
=== Bellator MMA ===
Making his professional MMA and Bellator MMA debut, Cauley faced Jason Markland at Bellator 253 on November 19, 2020. He won the fight by TKO in the first round.

Cauley faced Deon Clash on October 16, 2021, at Bellator 268. He won the fight via technical knockout with one second left into round one.

Cauley faced Ben Parrish on January 29, 2022, at Bellator 273. He won the bout via technical knockout with 25 seconds remaining into the first round.

Cauley face Tyson Jeffries at Bellator 284 on August 12, 2022. He won the bout via knockout in the first round.

Cauley faced Jay Radick at Bellator 288: Nemkov vs. Anderson 2 on November 18, 2022. He won the bout by knockout in the first round.

Cauley faced Luke Trainer on March 31, 2023, at Bellator 293. He lost the fight via a rear-naked choke submission in the first round.

Cauley faced Hamza Salim on August 11, 2023, at Bellator 298. He won the fight by technical submission via arm triangle choke in the first round.

=== Professional Fighters League ===
On March 4, 2025, it was announced that Cauley joined the 2025 PFL Light Heavyweight Tournament.

In the quarterfinal, Cauley was scheduled to face Marcelo Nunes on May 1, 2025, at PFL 4. However, Nunes withdrew from the bout and was replaced by former LFA Heavyweight Champion Alex Polizzi. Cauley won the fight by technical knockout in the first round.

In the semifinals, Cauley faced Phil Davis at PFL 7 on June 27, 2025. He won the fight via unanimous decision. In July 2025, he reached No. 10 in the light heavyweight rankings according to Fight Matrix.

In the finals, Cauley is faced Antônio Carlos Júnior on August 21, 2025, at PFL 10. He lost the bout via submission in the second round.

Cauley faced Rasul Magomedov on July 25, 2026, at PFL Washington DC. He lost the fight via unanimous decision.

== Championships and accomplishments ==
=== Mixed martial arts ===
- Professional Fighters League
  - 2025 PFL Light Heavyweight Tournament Finalist
- Fight Matrix
  - 2025 Comeback Fighter of the Year

=== Muay Thai ===
- International Federation of Muaythai Associations
  - 2019 IFMA World Championships U-23 +91 kg (silver)

== Mixed martial arts record ==
Professional record breakdown
10 matches	8 wins	2 losses
By knockout	6	0
By submission	1	2
By decision	1	0

Res.	Record	Opponent	Method	Event	Date	Round	Time	Location	Notes
Loss	8–3	Rasul Magomedov	Decision (unanimous)	PFL Washington DC: Jean vs. Rodriguez	July 25, 2026	3	5:00	Washington, D.C., United States	
Loss	8–2	Antônio Carlos Jr.	Submission (rear-naked choke)	PFL 10 (2025)	August 21, 2025	2	3:44	Hollywood, Florida, United States	2025 PFL Light Heavyweight Tournament Final.
Win	8–1	Phil Davis	Decision (unanimous)	PFL 7 (2025)	June 27, 2025	3	5:00	Chicago, Illinois, United States	2025 PFL Light Heavyweight Tournament Semifinal.
Win	7–1	Alex Polizzi	TKO (elbows and punches)	PFL 4 (2025)	May 1, 2025	1	1:36	Orlando, Florida, United States	2025 PFL Light Heavyweight Tournament Quarterfinal.
Win	6–1	Hamza Salim	Technical Submission (arm triangle choke)	Bellator 298	August 11, 2023	1	4:24	Sioux Falls, South Dakota, United States	
Loss	5–1	Luke Trainer	Submission (rear-naked choke)	Bellator 293	March 31, 2023	1	2:58	Temecula, California, United States	
Win	5–0	Jay Radick	KO (punch)	Bellator 288	November 18, 2022	1	1:01	Chicago, Illinois, United States	
Win	4–0	Tyson Jeffries	KO (knee)	Bellator 284	August 12, 2022	1	1:39	Sioux Falls, South Dakota, United States	
Win	3–0	Ben Parrish	TKO (punches)	Bellator 273	January 29, 2022	1	4:35	Phoenix, Arizona, United States	
Win	2–0	Deon Clash	TKO (elbows and punches)	Bellator 268	October 16, 2021	1	4:59	Phoenix, Arizona, United States	
Win	1–0	Jason Markland	TKO (elbows and punches)	Bellator 253	November 19, 2020	1	0:28	Uncasville, Connecticut, United States	
