= Bellator 294 =

Mixed martial arts event in 2023

Bellator 294: Carmouche vs. Bennett 2
- The poster for Bellator 294: Carmouche vs. Bennett 2
- Promotion: Bellator MMA
- Date: April 21, 2023
- Venue: Neal S. Blaisdell Arena
- City: Honolulu, Hawaii, United States

Event chronology
Bellator 293: Golm vs. James	Bellator 294: Carmouche vs. Bennett 2	Bellator 295: Stots vs. Mix

Bellator 294: Carmouche vs. Bennett 2 was a mixed martial arts event produced by Bellator MMA that took place on April 21, 2023, at the Neal S. Blaisdell Arena in Honolulu, Hawaii, United States.

== Background ==
The event marked the promotion's seventh visit to Hawaii and first since Bellator 279 in April 2022. It was also dedicated for military and first responders meaning that there will be no tickets on sale to the general public.

A Bellator Women's Flyweight World Championship bout between current champion Liz Carmouche and DeAnna Bennett headlined the event. Bennett and Carmouche previously squared off in September 2020, with Carmouche submitting Bennett in both fighters' Bellator debuts.

At the weigh-ins, Bennett weighed in at 126.2 pounds, 1.2 pounds over the title flyweight fight limit. The bout proceeded at catchweight with Bennett being fined 30% of his purse, which went to her opponent Carmouche. Carmouche also chose to keep the title on the line, meaning if she loses the fight, the title will become vacant. Likewise, Blake Smith (146.4 lbs) and Cris Lencioni (152.4 lbs) both missed weight for their bout, coming in .4 and 6.4 pounds over the non-title limits. The bout proceeded at catchweight and both were fined a percentage of their purses.

== Results ==
Main Card (Showtime)
Weight class				Method	Round	Time	Notes
Women's Flyweight	Liz Carmouche (c)	def.	DeAnna Bennett	Submission (arm-triangle choke)	4	4:29	(Note: For the Bellator Women's Flyweight World Championship. Bennett missed weight (126.2 lbs) and was ineligible for the title.)
Heavyweight	Timothy Johnson	def.	Said Sowma	Decision (unanimous) (29–28, 29–28, 29–28)	3	5:00
Women's Featherweight	Sara McMann	def.	Arlene Blencowe	Decision (unanimous) (29–27, 30–27, 30–26)	3	5:00
Bantamweight	Danny Sabatello	def.	Marcos Breno	Submission (rear-naked choke)	2	4:10
Welterweight	Levan Chokheli	def.	Michael Lombardo	Decision (unanimous) (29–28, 30–27, 30–27)	3	5:00
Preliminary card (Youtube/Pluto TV)
Lightweight	Killys Mota	def.	Kenneth Cross	Submission (rear-naked choke)	2	2:14
Heavyweight	Tyrell Fortune	def.	Sergey Bilostenniy	DQ (punches to the back of the head)	1	3:26
Catchweight (152.4 lb)	Cris Lencioni	def.	Blake Smith	Submission (inverted triangle choke)	2	3:39	(Note: Smith (146.4 lbs) and Lencioni (152.4 lbs) both missed weight.)
Middleweight	Sharaf Davlatmurodov	def.	Anthony Adams	Decision (unanimous) (30–27, 30–27, 30–27)	3	5:00

== See also ==
- 2023 in Bellator MMA
- List of Bellator MMA events
- List of current Bellator fighters
