= 2020 European Wrestling Championships – Men's freestyle 125 kg =

Wrestling competition

The men's freestyle 125 kg is a competition featured at the 2020 European Wrestling Championships, and was held in Rome, Italy on February 15 and February 16.

== Medalists ==
Gold	Geno Petriashvili; Georgia
Silver	Robert Baran; Poland
Bronze	Baldan Tsyzhipov; Russia
Bronze	Jamaladdin Magomedov; Azerbaijan

== Results ==
Legend

- F — Won by fall

=== Final ===
Final
Geno Petriashvili (GEO)	11
Robert Baran (POL)	0

=== Top half ===
Round of 32

Round of 16
Boban Danov (MKD)	1
Ihar Dziatko (BLR)	7
Oleksandr Khotsianivskyi (UKR)	10
Ryan Malo (ITA)	0
Baldan Tsyzhipov (RUS)	10
Dániel Ligeti (HUN)	5
José Cuba (ESP)	0
Geno Petriashvili (GEO)	10

Quarterfinals
Ihar Dziatko (BLR)	2
Oleksandr Khotsianivskyi (UKR)	3
Baldan Tsyzhipov (RUS)	0
Geno Petriashvili (GEO)	11

Semifinals
Oleksandr Khotsianivskyi (UKR)	2
Geno Petriashvili (GEO)	7

=== Bottom half ===
Round of 32
Paris Karepi (ALB)	3
Tanju Gemici (TUR)	5
Jamaladdin Magomedov (AZE)	11
Elhad Hukić (BIH)	0

Round of 16
Nick Matuhin (GER)	8
Alexandr Romanov (MDA)	3
Rareș Chintoan (ROU)	1
Levan Berianidze (ARM)	4
Robert Baran (POL)	11
Johannes Ludescher (AUT)	0
Tanju Gemici (TUR)	0
Jamaladdin Magomedov (AZE)	11

Quarterfinals
Nick Matuhin (GER)	0
Levan Berianidze (ARM)	3
Robert Baran (POL)	12
Jamaladdin Magomedov (AZE)	2

Semifinals
Levan Berianidze (ARM)	0
Robert Baran (POL)	9

=== Repechage ===
Repechage round 2
José Cuba (ESP)	0
Baldan Tsyzhipov (RUS)	4^{F}
Johannes Ludescher (AUT)	1
Jamaladdin Magomedov (AZE)	5

Bronze medal match
Baldan Tsyzhipov (RUS)	4
Oleksandr Khotsianivskyi (UKR)	1
Jamaladdin Magomedov (AZE)	4
Levan Berianidze (ARM)	2

== Final standing ==
Rank	Athlete
1st place, gold medalist(s)	Geno Petriashvili (GEO)
2nd place, silver medalist(s)	Robert Baran (POL)
3rd place, bronze medalist(s)	Baldan Tsyzhipov (RUS)
3rd place, bronze medalist(s)	Jamaladdin Magomedov (AZE)
5	Oleksandr Khotsianivskyi (UKR)
5	Levan Berianidze (ARM)
7	Ihar Dziatko (BLR)
8	Nick Matuhin (GER)
9	Tanju Gemici (TUR)
10	Dániel Ligeti (HUN)
11	Paris Karepi (ALB)
12	Alexandr Romanov (MDA)
13	Rareș Chintoan (ROU)
14	Boban Danov (MKD)
15	Johannes Ludescher (AUT)
16	Ryan Malo (ITA)
17	Elhad Hukić (BIH)
18	José Cuba (ESP)
