= PFL 7 (2024) =

Professional Fighters League MMA event in 2024

- The poster for PFL 7
- Promotion: Professional Fighters League
- Date: August 2, 2024
- Venue: Nashville Municipal Auditorium
- City: Nashville, Tennessee, United States

Event chronology
PFL MENA 2	PFL 7	PFL 8

The PFL 7 mixed martial arts event for the 2024 season of the Professional Fighters League was held on August 2, 2024, at the Nashville Municipal Auditorium in Nashville, Tennessee, United States. This marked the semi-final playoffs for the Women's Flyweight and Heavyweight divisions.

== Background ==
This event marked the promotion's first visit to Nashville and second in Tennessee state before it was rebranded promotion, since WSOF 27 in Memphis in January 2016.

The event featured the semifinal of 2024 PFL playoffs in a heavyweight and women's flyweight divisions. Oleg Popov was originally scheduled to face Valentin Moldavsky, but Moldavsky was forced to withdraw due to injury and was replaced by Linton Vassell.

At weigh-ins;

- Liz Carmouche missed weight by 1 pound, coming in at 127 pounds. Carmouche forfeited 20 percent of her purse and entered the bout with a 1-pound penalty on the scorecards.
- Sergio Cossio missed weight by 6.8 pounds at 162.8 pounds, for his lightweight fight with Dedrek Sanders. The fight moved forward, and Cossio paid a penalty.
- Willis (172.6 pounds) and Ivy (172.8 pounds) both missed weight. The fight moved forward at a 173 pound catchweight, and neither man was fined.

== Results ==
Main card (ESPN / ESPN+)
Weight class				Method	Round	Time	Notes
Heavyweight	Denis Goltsov	def.	Timothy Johnson	TKO (punches)	1	2:26	(Note: 2024 PFL Heavyweight Tournament Semifinal.)
Women's Flyweight	Dakota Ditcheva	def.	Jena Bishop	TKO (front kick to the body and punch)	1	3:54	(Note: 2024 PFL Women's Flyweight Tournament Semifinal.)
Heavyweight	Oleg Popov	def.	Linton Vassell	Decision (unanimous) (30–27, 30–27, 30–27)	3	5:00	(Note: 2024 PFL Heavyweight Tournament Semifinal.)
Women's Flyweight	Taila Santos	def.	Liz Carmouche	Decision (unanimous) (29–28, 29–28, 29–28)	3	5:00	(Note: 2024 PFL Women's Flyweight Tournament Semifinal. Carmouche missed weight (127 lb).)
Preliminary card (ESPN+)
Heavyweight	Sergey Bilostenniy	def.	Tyrell Fortune	Submission (heel hook)	1	2:00	(Note: 2024 PFL Heavyweight Tournament Alternate bout.)
Featherweight	Alexei Pergande	def.	Daniel Boehle	Decision (unanimous) (30–27, 30–27, 30–27)	3	5:00
Featherweight	Cody Law	def.	Zachary Hicks	Submission (rear-naked choke)	1	3:15
Catchweight (163 lb)	Dedrek Sanders	def.	Sergio Cossio	KO (punches)	1	2:34	(Note: Cossio missed weight (162.8 lb).)
Catchweight (173 lb)	Anthony Ivy	def.	Jaleel Willis	Submission (rear-naked choke)	2	4:49
Welterweight	Kevin Pease	def.	Nick Meck	Decision (unanimous) (29–28, 29–28, 29–28)	3	5:00

== Playoff brackets ==
=== 2024 PFL Heavyweight playoffs ===
Semifinals
1	(Russia) Denis Goltsov	TKO
4	(United States) Timothy Johnson	1
2	(Russia) Oleg Popov	UD
6	(England) Linton Vassell (Note: Oleg Popov was originally scheduled to face #3 ranked Valentin Moldavsky, but he forced to withdraw due to injury and was replaced by #6 ranked Linton Vassell.)	3r.

Finals
1	(Russia) Denis Goltsov
2	(Russia) Oleg Popov

=== 2024 PFL Women's Flyweight playoffs ===
Semifinals
1	(England) Dakota Ditcheva	TKO
4	(United States) Jena Bishop	1
2	(Brazil) Taila Santos	UD
3	(United States) Liz Carmouche	3r.

Finals
1	(England) Dakota Ditcheva
2	(Brazil) Taila Santos

Legend
(SD)	(Split Decision)
(UD)	(Unanimous Decision)
(MD)	(Majority Decision)
SUB	Submission
(T)KO	(Technical) Knock Out
L	Loss

== See also ==
- List of PFL events
- List of current PFL fighters
