= PFL 1 (2024) =

Professional Fighters League MMA event in 2024

- The poster for PFL 1
- Promotion: Professional Fighters League
- Date: April 4, 2024
- Venue: Boeing Center at Tech Port
- City: San Antonio, Texas, United States

Event chronology
PFL Europe 1	PFL 1	PFL 2

The PFL 1 mixed martial arts event for the 2024 season of the Professional Fighters League was held on April 4, 2024, at the Boeing Center at Tech Port in San Antonio, Texas, United States. This marked the first regular-season event of the tournament and included fights in the Women's Flyweight and Heavyweight divisions.

== Background ==
The event marked the promotion's second visit to San Antonio and first since PFL 7 (2023) in August 2023.

The event was headlined by a heavyweight bout between former interim Bellator Heavyweight Champion Valentin Moldavsky and 2022 PFL heavyweight winner Ante Delija.

A trilogy clash between Bellator Women's Flyweight World Champion Liz Carmouche and former champion Juliana Velasquez took place at this event.

Former UFC Women's Flyweight Championship title challenger Taila Santos was expected to face former Bellator Kickboxing Women's Flyweight Champion Denise Kielholtz in a women's flyweight bout. However, a week before the event it was announced that Kielholtz had pulled out and replaced by Ilara Joanne.

On March 26, changes to the fight lineup saw 2021 PFL heavyweight winner Bruno Cappelozza replaced by former WSOF Heavyweight Champion Blagoy Ivanov against Sergei Bilostenniy, and a PFL women's flyweight alternate bout between Kaytlin Neil and Sumiko Inaba removed from the card.

Originally, Daniel James was expected to face Tyrell Fortune in a rematch at the event. However, on the fight week it was announced that Fortune withdrew from the event and was replaced by Marcelo Golm. At weigh-ins, Daniel James came in at 267 lbs, 1 pound over the limit for heavyweight, while Shanna Young weighed in at 128.6 lbs, 2.6 pounds over the flyweight limit. They were fined a percentage of their purses and given a point deduction in the standings.

== Results ==
Main card (ESPN2 / ESPN+)
Weight class				Method	Round	Time	Notes
Heavyweight	Valentin Moldavsky	def.	Ante Delija	TKO (knees and punches)	1	2:17
Heavyweight	Denis Goltsov	def.	Linton Vassell	TKO (punches)	3	3:11
Women's Flyweight	Liz Carmouche	def.	Juliana Velasquez	Decision (unanimous) (30–27, 30–27, 30–27)	3	5:00
Women's Flyweight	Dakota Ditcheva	def.	Lisa Mauldin	TKO (knee to the body and punches)	1	3:54
Preliminary card (ESPN+)
Heavyweight	Daniel James	def.	Marcelo Golm	TKO (punches)	1	4:59	(Note: James missed weight (267 lb).)
Heavyweight	Sergey Bilostenniy	def.	Blagoy Ivanov	Decision (unanimous) (29–28, 29–28, 29–28)	3	5:00
Women's Flyweight	Taila Santos	def.	Ilara Joanne	Submission (rear-naked choke)	1	3:57
Heavyweight	Oleg Popov	def.	Steve Mowry	TKO (punches)	2	3:47
Women's Flyweight	Kana Watanabe	def.	Shanna Young	Decision (unanimous) (30–27, 30–27, 30–27)	3	5:00	(Note: Young missed weight (128.6 lb).)
Women's Flyweight	Jena Bishop	def.	Chelsea Hackett	Submission (armbar)	1	4:15
Featherweight	Dimitre Ivy	def.	Lucas Brennan	Decision (unanimous) (29–28, 29–28, 29–28)	3	5:00
Bantamweight	Bryce Meredith	def.	Ty Johnson	Decision (unanimous) (30–27, 30–27, 30–27)	3	5:00

== Standings after event ==
The PFL points system is based on results of the match. The winner of a fight receives 3 points. If the fight ends in a draw, both fighters will receive 1 point. The bonus for winning a fight in the first, second, or third round is 3 points, 2 points, and 1 point respectively. The bonus for winning in the third round requires a fight be stopped before 4:59 of the third round. No bonus point will be awarded if a fighter wins via decision. For example, if a fighter wins a fight in the first round, then the fighter will receive 6 total points. A decision win will result in three total points. If a fighter misses weight, the opponent (should they comply with weight limits) will receive 3 points due to a walkover victory, regardless of winning or losing the bout; if the non-offending fighter subsequently wins with a stoppage, all bonus points will be awarded.

=== Heavyweight ===
Fighter	Wins	Draws	Losses	1st	2nd	3rd	Total Points (Note: The four fighters with most points advance to the playoffs)
(Russia) Valentin Moldavsky	1	0	0	1	0	0	6
(Russia) Oleg Popov	1	0	0	0	1	0	5
(United States) Daniel James	1	0	0	1	0	0	5
(Russia) Denis Goltsov	1	0	0	0	0	1	4
(Russia) Sergei Bilostenniy	1	0	0	0	0	0	3
(Bulgaria) Blagoy Ivanov	0	0	1	0	0	0	0
(England) Linton Vassell	0	0	1	0	0	0	0
(United States) Steve Mowry	0	0	1	0	0	0	0
(Brazil) Marcelo Golm	0	0	1	0	0	0	0
(Croatia) Ante Delija	0	0	1	0	0	0	0

=== Women's flyweight ===
Fighter	Wins	Draws	Losses	1st	2nd	3rd	Total Points (Note: The four fighters with most points advance to the playoffs)
(England) Dakota Ditcheva	1	0	0	1	0	0	6
(Brazil) Taila Santos	1	0	0	1	0	0	6
(United States) Jena Bishop	1	0	0	1	0	0	6
(United States) Liz Carmouche	1	0	0	0	0	0	3
(Japan) Kana Watanabe	1	0	0	0	0	0	3
(Brazil) Juliana Velasquez	0	0	1	0	0	0	0
(Australia) Chelsea Hackett	0	0	1	0	0	0	0
(Brazil) Ilara Joanne	0	0	1	0	0	0	0
(United States) Lisa Mauldin	0	0	1	0	0	0	0
(United States) Shanna Young	0	0	1	0	0	0	-1

== See also ==
- List of PFL events
- List of current PFL fighters
