= Karl Moore (fighter) =

Northern Irish mixed martial arts fighter

- Born: October 24, 1991 (age 34); Belfast, Northern Ireland
- Height: 6 ft 3 in (1.91 m)
- Weight: 205 lb (93 kg; 14 st 9 lb)
- Division: Light heavyweight
- Reach: 75 in (191 cm)
- Fighting out of: Belfast, Northern Ireland
- Team: SBG Ireland
- Years active: 2011–present

Mixed martial arts record
- Total: 16
- Wins: 12
- By knockout: 2
- By submission: 5
- By decision: 5
- Losses: 4
- By knockout: 1
- By submission: 1
- By decision: 2

Other information
- Mixed martial arts record from Sherdog

Karl Moore (born October 24, 1991) is a Northern Irish mixed martial artist who competes in the Light Heavyweight division. He has also competed in Cage Warriors (CW), where he was the Light Heavyweight Championship, in Bellator MMA, where he was a Light Heavyweight Title contender, and PFL.

== Background ==
Born and raised in the streets of Twinbrook, Belfast, Moore's journey into the world of combat sports began with wrestling matches on the gritty roads of Belfast. Influenced by the larger-than-life personas of 'Stone Cold' Steve Austin and his father's background in martial arts, Moore found himself drawn to the raw intensity of MMA at a young age. Despite initially dabbling in various disciplines like BJJ, judo, and Thai boxing, it was the all-encompassing nature of mixed martial arts that truly captivated him.

At 16, Moore took the plunge into formal MMA training at Fight Academy Ireland Gym in Poleglass, where his passion for the sport solidified. However, the path to success was far from easy. Moore endured hardships typical of aspiring fighters: working multiple jobs, scraping by on minimal income, and even resorting to sleeping on a gym mattress. Moore's life took a significant turn when he crossed paths with Gerry Storey, a legendary figure in Belfast's boxing scene. Under Storey's tutelage, Moore honed his skills and showcased his talent in the ring, earning a victory in his lone boxing bout organized by Storey.

== Mixed martial arts career ==
=== Early career ===
Moore started his professional MMA career in 2011 at Battlezone FC 4, where he clinched the Battlezone FC Light Heavyweight Championship with a first-round triangle choke victory over Rimantas Pukas. He would continue his win streak across the UK regionals, most notably defeating future UFC fighter Cyril Asker. However, Moore faced a setback at BAMMA 22 on September 19, 2015, where he succumbed to a guillotine choke submission by Paul Craig in the second round. Moore bounced back with two first round finishes before challenging for the Cage Warriors Light Heavyweight Championship at Cage Warriors 81 on March 4, 2017, where he claimed the vacant title with a hard-fought unanimous decision victory over Josh Clark.

Transitioning to the heavyweight division, Moore faced Mauro Cerilli for the Cage Warriors Heavyweight Championship at Cage Warriors 92 on March 24, 2018, in London, England. Despite his efforts, Moore fell short, suffering a first-round KO due to a devastating knee and subsequent punches.

=== Bellator MMA ===
Moore signed a contract with Bellator MMA, and made his promotional debut on September 27, 2019, at Bellator 227 against Lee Chadwick. He won the fight by split decision.

Moore faced Karl Albrektsson on September 23, 2022, at Bellator 285. He won the fight via face crank submission in the second round.

Moore faced Maciej Różański on February 25, 2023, at Bellator 291. He won the fight by unanimous decision.

Moore faced Alex Polizzi on June 16, 2023, at Bellator 297. He won the bout by unanimous decision.

After Vadim Nemkov vacated the Light Heavyweight title, Moore faced Corey Anderson on March 22, 2024, at Bellator Champions Series 1 for the vacant Bellator Light Heavyweight World Championship. He lost the bout via unanimous decision, getting dominated in the wrestling throughout the bout.

=== Professional Fighters League ===
On March 4, 2025, the promotion officially revealed that Moore will join the 2025 PFL Light Heavyweight Tournament.

In the quarterfinal, Moore faced Antônio Carlos Júnior on May 1, 2025, at PFL 4. He lost the fight by split decision.

On April 30, 2025 it was announced that Moore had tested positive for recombinant erythropoietin (rEPO) as the result of an out-of-competition sample collected on April 9, 2025. USADA gave him a 1 year suspension that began on April 9. It was also announced that Moore had been released from the promotion prior to the suspension.

== Championships and achievements ==
=== Mixed martial arts ===
- BattleZone Fighting Championships
  - Battlezone FC Light Heavyweight Championship (One Time)
- Cage Warriors
  - Cage Warriors Light Heavyweight Championship (One Time)

== Mixed martial arts record ==
Professional record breakdown
| 16 matches | 12 wins | 4 losses |
| By knockout | 2 | 1 |
| By submission | 5 | 1 |
| By decision | 5 | 2 |

| Res. | Record | Opponent | Method | Event | Date | Round | Time | Location | Notes |
|---|---|---|---|---|---|---|---|---|---|
| Loss | 12–4 | Antônio Carlos Júnior | Decision (split) | PFL 4 (2025) | May 1, 2025 | 3 | 5:00 | Orlando, Florida, United States | 2025 PFL Light Heavyweight Tournament Quarterfinal. |
| Loss | 12–3 | Corey Anderson | Decision (unanimous) | Bellator Champions Series 1 | March 22, 2024 | 5 | 5:00 | Belfast, Northern Ireland | For the vacant Bellator Light Heavyweight World Championship. |
| Win | 12–2 | Alex Polizzi | Decision (unanimous) | Bellator 297 | June 16, 2023 | 3 | 5:00 | Chicago, Illinois, United States | |
| Win | 11–2 | Maciej Różański | Decision (unanimous) | Bellator 291 | February 25, 2023 | 3 | 5:00 | Dublin, Ireland | |
| Win | 10–2 | Karl Albrektsson | Submission (face crank) | Bellator 285 | September 23, 2022 | 2 | 3:36 | Dublin, Ireland | |
| Win | 9–2 | Lee Chadwick | Decision (split) | Bellator 227 | September 27, 2019 | 3 | 5:00 | Dublin, Ireland | Return to Light Heavyweight. |
| Loss | 8–2 | Mauro Cerilli | KO (knee and punches) | Cage Warriors 92 | March 24, 2018 | 1 | 0:15 | London, England | Heavyweight debut. For the Cage Warriors Heavyweight Championship. |
| Win | 8–1 | Josh Clark | Decision (unanimous) | Cage Warriors 81 | March 4, 2017 | 5 | 5:00 | Dublin, Ireland | Won the vacant Cage Warriors Light Heavyweight Championship. |
| Win | 7–1 | Paco Estevez | KO (punches) | Cage Warriors: Unplugged 1 | November 12, 2016 | 1 | 3:23 | London, England | |
| Win | 6–1 | Prince Aounallah | Submission (arm-triangle choke) | Venator FC 2 | December 12, 2015 | 1 | 4:30 | Rimini, Italy | |
| Loss | 5–1 | Paul Craig | Submission (guillotine choke) | BAMMA 22 | September 19, 2015 | 2 | 0:42 | Dublin, Ireland | |
| Win | 5–0 | Lloyd Clarkson | Decision (unanimous) | Cage Warriors 70 | August 16, 2014 | 3 | 5:00 | Dublin, Ireland | |
| Win | 4–0 | Richie Knox | TKO (punches) | Cage Warriors 62 | July 12, 2013 | 1 | 2:36 | Newcastle, England | |
| Win | 3–0 | Cyril Asker | Submission (rear-naked choke) | Cage Contender 17 | May 25, 2013 | 3 | N/A | Newry, Northern Ireland | |
| Win | 2–0 | Washington Ferreira | Submission (rear-naked choke) | Cage Contender 14 | July 21, 2012 | 2 | 2:52 | Dublin, Ireland | |
| Win | 1–0 | Rimantas Pukas | Submission (triangle choke) | Battlezone FC 4 | November 12, 2011 | 1 | 3:45 | Dublin, Ireland | Light Heavyweight debut. Won the Battlezone FC Light Heavyweight Championship. |

== See also ==
- List of male mixed martial artists
