= Baldan Tsyzhipov =

Russian freestyle wrestler

Baldan Tsyzhipov Балдан Цыжипов
Personal information
- Native name: Балдан Мижитдоржиевич Цыжипов
- Full name: Baldan Mizhitdorzhievich Tsyzhipov
- Nationality: Russia
- Born: May 30, 1990 (age 36) Aga-Khangal village, Chita Oblast, Soviet Union
- Height: 192 cm (6 ft 4 in)

Sport
- Country: Russia
- Sport: Amateur wrestling
- Weight class: 125 kg
- Event: Freestyle
- Coached by: Konstantin Baldaev, Boris Darzhinimaev
Medal record
Men's freestyle wrestling
Representing Russia
European Championships
Bronze medal – third place	2020 Rome	125 kg
Golden Grand Prix Ivan Yarygin
Gold medal – first place	2020 Krasnoyarsk	125 kg
Bronze medal – third place	2016 Krasnoyarsk	125 kg
Representing Buryatia
Russian Wrestling Championships
Bronze medal – third place	2016 Sakha	125 kg
Bronze medal – third place	2021 Buryatia	125 kg
Bronze medal – third place	2022 Tuva	125 kg

Baldan Mizhitdorzhievich Tsyzhipov (Russian: Балдан Мижитдоржиевич Цыжипов; born 30 May 1990 in Chita Oblast) is a Russian freestyle wrestler of Buryat heritage. He won one of the bronze medals in the 125 kg event at the 2020 European Wrestling Championships held in Rome, Italy.

== Major results ==
Year	Tournament	Venue	Result	Event
2020	European Championships	Rome, Italy	3rd	Freestyle 125 kg
