= Blagoy Ivanov =

Bulgarian mixed martial artist

- Born: Blagoy Ivanov; October 9, 1986 (age 40); Sofia, People's Republic of Bulgaria
- Native name: Благой Иванов
- Other names: Bagata
- Nationality: Bulgarian
- Height: 5 ft 11 in (180 cm)
- Weight: 257 lb (117 kg; 18 st 5 lb)
- Division: Heavyweight
- Reach: 73 in (185 cm)
- Style: Combat Sambo, Judo, Kickboxing
- Team: Combat Sambo - Bulgaria; American Kickboxing Academy
- Rank: International Master of Sports in Sambo; Black belt in Judo
- Years active: 2007–present

Mixed martial arts record
- Total: 27
- Wins: 19
- By knockout: 6
- By submission: 6
- By decision: 7
- Losses: 7
- By submission: 1
- By decision: 6
- No contests: 1

Other information
- Mixed martial arts record from Sherdog
- Last updated on: March 27, 2011

Blagoy Ivanov (Bulgarian: Благой Александров Иванов; born October 9, 1986) is a Bulgarian mixed martial artist and Sambo practitioner. He previously competed for the Ultimate Fighting Championship (UFC) and Professional Fighters League (PFL). He was also the 2008 Combat Sambo World Champion and the former World Series of Fighting Heavyweight Champion.

== Background ==
Blagoy has competed in judo as a heavyweight national representative for Bulgaria. He competed in the 2003 Balkan Junior Championships and placed first. He then continued in competition up to the European Championships level but only placed 7th in the 2007 U23 Tournament, and did not make an attempt to represent Bulgaria in the 2008 Olympic games. Ivanov chose to enter into a career in mixed martial arts as opposed to representing Bulgaria in the 2012 Olympic Games.

== Sambo career ==
He notably defeated four-time World Combat Sambo Champion and mixed martial arts fighter Fedor Emelianenko in the semi-finals of the 2008 World Sambo Championships on November 16, 2008. (He went on to win the finals over Germany's Janosch Stefan the following day.) Ivanov previously faced Emelianenko in February 2008 at Russia's Presidents Cup Sambo competition, losing the match to Emelianenko.

== Mixed martial arts career ==
Ivanov started a career in mixed martial arts in his home country (2 wins and 1 NC) before going to World Victory Road, where he signed a three-fight deal. His first fight took place at Sengoku 9 where he defeated Pride FC veteran, Kazuyuki Fujita by split decision, breaking both hands in the process.

Ivanov was set next to face Fedor's brother, Aleksander Emelianenko, but that fight and eventually the entire event on which the fight should have occurred was canceled because Blagoy had broken both his hands in the fight against Fujita and was not able to heal and prepare properly for his fight with Aleksander.

Recently, in the capital city of Bulgaria - Sofia, Bagata defeated another well-known Bulgarian MMA fighter Svetoslav Zahariev who was European champion in grappling, heavyweight division. In the interview given after the fight, Bagata said that he was ready for a rematch with Svetoslav, but also with his brother, who is a fighter too. He added that he needs more easy matches like the last one in order to get in shape for the real challenges. According to Blagoy, in December 2010 he would go to fight and train in Las Vegas, USA.

=== Bellator MMA ===
On March 15, 2011, Ivanov announced that he had signed a deal to fight for Bellator. He debuted on March 26, 2011, at Bellator 38 against William Penn and won via first-round TKO.

Ivanov was expected to face Thiago Santos as part of a quarterfinals tournament at Bellator 52 on October 1 at the L'Audberge du Lac Casino Resort in Lake Charles, La. The tournament was to determine a No. 1 contender to face champion Cole Konrad. Santos, however, was unable to travel from Brazil for the event and was replaced by Zak Jensen.

Ivanov defeated Jensen by technical submission due to a guillotine choke at 2:35 into round 2. The 2008 Combat Sambo World Champion Ivanov used superior boxing technique, speed, and accuracy to bloody the face, Jensen, in round one. Jensen offered little offense, and it bordered on a 10–8 round. An outside trip takedown from Ivanov started off the second frame, where he immediately began to crank on an Americana attempt. Jensen gave up full mount attempting to defend. Eventually, Jensen was able to scramble out, but as he drove forward attempting to push Ivanov against the fence he left his neck exposed. Ivanov locked in a tight guillotine choke that left Jensen unconscious and unable to tap. The impressive performance from Ivanov furthers his career-winning streak to eleven.

On 24 Dec 2011, Ivanov defeated Ricco Rodriguez in the third round via TKO with a kick to the upper body that some felt hit Rodriguez's head, as he was still getting up from his knees. The fight took place in Chekhov, Moscow suburb, and Ivanov fought under the Russian banner.

=== Return to MMA ===
Ivanov returned to MMA competition after a 21-month absence due to injuries sustained in a bar fight and fought Manny Lara on September 13, 2013, at Bellator 99. He won the fight via submission in the first round.

Ivanov next fought on November 22, 2013, at Bellator 109 and faced Keith Bell. Ivanov was initially dropped by Bell early into the fight, but recovered and won the fight via submission.

In March 2014, Ivanov returned to the Heavyweight division. He faced Rich Hale in the opening round of the Bellator Season 10 Heavyweight tournament at Bellator 111 on March 7, 2014. He won the fight via unanimous decision.

He faced Lavar Johnson in the semifinals at Bellator 116 on April 11, 2014, and won via submission in the first round.

He faced Alexander Volkov in the tournament final on May 17, 2014, at Bellator 120. He lost the fight via submission in the second round, resulting in his first professional loss.

=== World Series of Fighting ===
On January 24, 2015, it was announced that Ivanov signed with WSOF.

In his debut, Ivanov faced Smealinho Rama for the WSOF Heavyweight championship at WSOF 21 on June 5, 2015 He won the fight and championship due to a submission in the third round.

Ivanov made his first title defense against Derrick Mehmen at WSOF 24 on October 17, 2015. He won the fight via TKO in the second round.

For his second title defense, Ivanov faced Josh Copeland at WSOF 31 on June 17, 2016. He won the fight via unanimous decision (49–46, 49–46, and 48–47).

For his third title defense, Ivanov faced Shawn Jordan. The bout was originally scheduled for February 28 (incorrectly reported as Feb 25) but was rescheduled to March 18, 2017. Ivanov won the fight via TKO in the first round.

=== Ultimate Fighting Championship ===
On April 25, 2018, it was reported that Ivanov was signed by Ultimate Fighting Championship. He made his UFC debut against former UFC Heavyweight champion Junior dos Santos on July 14 at UFC Fight Night 133. He lost the fight via unanimous decision.

In his second fight for the promotion, Ivanov faced Ben Rothwell on March 9, 2019, at UFC Fight Night 146. He won the fight by unanimous decision.

In his third fight with the company, Ivanov faced Tai Tuivasa on June 8, 2019, at UFC 238. He won the fight by unanimous decision.

Ivanov faced Derrick Lewis on November 2, 2019, at UFC 244. He lost the fight via split decision.

Ivanov was scheduled to face Augusto Sakai on May 9, 2020, at UFC 250. However, on April 9, Dana White, the president of UFC announced that this event was postponed and the bout eventually took place on May 30, 2020, at UFC on ESPN: Woodley vs. Burns. He lost the fight via a split decision.

Ivanov was expected to face Marcin Tybura on March 27, 2021, at UFC 260. However, Ivanov was pulled from the bout, citing injury.

Ivanov faced Marcos Rogério de Lima on May 7, 2022, at UFC 274. He won the fight via unanimous decision.

Ivanov faced Marcin Tybura on February 4, 2023, at UFC Fight Night 218. He lost the fight via unanimous decision.

Ivanov faced Alexander Romanov at UFC on ESPN 48 on 1 July 2023. He lost the fight by unanimous decision.

On July 20, 2023, it was announced that Ivanov was no longer on the UFC roster.

=== PFL ===
Ivanov debuted with the Professional Fighters League (PFL) at PFL 1 on April 4, 2024, and lost his bout against Sergei Bilostenniy by unanimous decision.

On 4 September 2024, Ivanov was suspended from competition by USADA until January 2026 because of a failed test for anabolic steroids.

== Bar fight incident ==
In the early morning of February 26, 2012, a group of eight men entered the bar "Ice" in Sofia and attacked Ivanov and his two friends. Ivanov was stabbed below the sternum and a lung was damaged. He fought off all the attackers and hailed a cab to the hospital. He was in the intensive care unit after six hours of life-saving medical intervention at Sofia's Pirogov Hospital, his condition stabilized with the aid of an artificial respirator. He remained in critical care for several weeks.

The police apprehended a 23-year-old suspect, nicknamed Dampela ("The Dumbbell") with a long criminal record, and charged him with the stabbing. Bulgaria's Interior Minister, Tsvetan Tsvetanov, used the speed of the arrest as an argument for success in the country's battle against organized crime, in a speech two days after the attack.

On March 5, 2012, Ivanov was reported to be in stable condition, having regained consciousness over the weekend. While his life was still considered to be in danger, he was switched to a milder treatment regimen.

Dampela claimed that Ivanov initiated the fight, at one point slapping Dampela in the face. Dampela had a criminal record of extortion, drug dealing, and fraudulent car registration. The defense claimed that Dampela did not know he stabbed Ivanov and went to the police immediately after finding out he did. The prosecution claimed that Dampela bragged about the incident and picked the fight with Ivanov in a drunken rage.

On March 12, 2012, Ivanov's condition deteriorated. A second surgery was performed and he was placed in an artificial coma. On May 19 Ivanov had been taken out of a medically induced coma, and had spoken with doctors. He was expected to make a full recovery in six months to a year. Dampela remained in permanent detention.

Around May 12, 2012, Ivanov regained the ability to talk and gave a brief press conference on the 19th in the hospital. He declared that he wanted to return to the ring and the doctors confirmed that he would be able to recover in six months to a year.

On May 28, Ivanov left the hospital's intensive care unit. He stated that he wanted to return to competition and doctors confirmed that he could return the next year.

Ivanov made his MMA return in September 2013 and won his next four fights.

== Championships and accomplishments ==
=== Mixed martial arts ===
- Bellator MMA
  - Bellator Season 10 Heavyweight Tournament: Runner-Up
- World Series of Fighting
  - WSOF Heavyweight Championship (1 time)
    - Four successful title defenses

=== Sambo ===
- Fédération Internationale de Sambo (FIAS)
  - 2008 World Championships - Gold Medalist in combat sambo at +100 kg
  - 2006 World Championships - Bronze Medalist in sambo wrestling at 100 kg

== Mixed martial arts record ==
Professional record breakdown
27 matches	19 wins	7 losses
By knockout	6	0
By submission	6	1
By decision	7	6
No contests	1	

Res.	Record	Opponent	Method	Event	Date	Round	Time	Location	Notes
Loss	19–7 (1)	Sergei Bilostenniy	Decision (unanimous)	PFL 1 (2024)	April 4, 2024	3	5:00	San Antonio, Texas, United States	
Loss	19–6 (1)	Alexander Romanov	Decision (unanimous)	UFC on ESPN: Strickland vs. Magomedov	July 1, 2023	3	5:00	Las Vegas, Nevada, United States	
Loss	19–5 (1)	Marcin Tybura	Decision (unanimous)	UFC Fight Night: Lewis vs. Spivac	February 4, 2023	3	5:00	Las Vegas, Nevada, United States	
Win	19–4 (1)	Marcos Rogério de Lima	Decision (unanimous)	UFC 274	May 7, 2022	3	5:00	Phoenix, Arizona, United States	
Loss	18–4 (1)	Augusto Sakai	Decision (split)	UFC on ESPN: Woodley vs. Burns	May 30, 2020	3	5:00	Las Vegas, Nevada, United States	
Loss	18–3 (1)	Derrick Lewis	Decision (split)	UFC 244	November 2, 2019	3	5:00	New York City, New York, United States	
Win	18–2 (1)	Tai Tuivasa	Decision (unanimous)	UFC 238	June 8, 2019	3	5:00	Chicago, Illinois, United States	
Win	17–2 (1)	Ben Rothwell	Decision (unanimous)	UFC Fight Night: Lewis vs. dos Santos	March 9, 2019	3	5:00	Wichita, Kansas, United States	
Loss	16–2 (1)	Junior dos Santos	Decision (unanimous)	UFC Fight Night: dos Santos vs. Ivanov	July 14, 2018	5	5:00	Boise, Idaho, United States	
Win	16–1 (1)	Caio Alencar	Decision (unanimous)	PFL: Fight Night	November 2, 2017	3	5:00	Washington, D.C., United States	Defended the PFL Heavyweight Championship.
Win	15–1 (1)	Shawn Jordan	TKO (punches)	WSOF 35	March 18, 2017	1	1:43	Verona, New York, United States	Defended the WSOF Heavyweight Championship.
Win	14–1 (1)	Josh Copeland	Decision (unanimous)	WSOF 31	June 17, 2016	5	5:00	Mashantucket, Connecticut, United States	Defended the WSOF Heavyweight Championship.
Win	13–1 (1)	Derrick Mehmen	TKO (punches)	WSOF 24	October 17, 2015	2	4:33	Mashantucket, Connecticut, United States	Defended the WSOF Heavyweight Championship.
Win	12–1 (1)	Smealinho Rama	Submission (guillotine choke)	WSOF 21	June 5, 2015	3	1:17	Edmonton, Alberta, Canada	Won the WSOF Heavyweight Championship.
Loss	11–1 (1)	Alexander Volkov	Submission (rear-naked choke)	Bellator 120	May 17, 2014	2	1:08	Southaven, Mississippi, United States	Bellator MMA: Season Ten Heavyweight Tournament Final.
Win	11–0 (1)	Lavar Johnson	Submission (Americana)	Bellator 116	April 11, 2014	1	4:08	Temecula, California, United States	Bellator MMA: Season Ten Heavyweight Tournament Semifinal.
Win	10–0 (1)	Rich Hale	Decision (unanimous)	Bellator 111	March 7, 2014	3	5:00	Thackerville, Oklahoma, United States	Bellator MMA: Season Ten Heavyweight Tournament Quarterfinal.
Win	9–0 (1)	Keith Bell	Submission (rear-naked choke)	Bellator 109	November 22, 2013	1	3:59	Bethlehem, Pennsylvania, United States	
Win	8–0 (1)	Manny Lara	Submission (standing guillotine choke)	Bellator 99	September 13, 2013	1	1:17	Temecula, California, United States	
Win	7–0 (1)	Ricco Rodriguez	TKO (retirement)	Chekhov MMA Tournament	December 24, 2011	3	3:33	Chekhov, Russia	
Win	6–0 (1)	Zak Jensen	Technical Submission (guillotine choke)	Bellator 52	October 1, 2011	2	2:35	Lake Charles, Louisiana, United States	Bellator Season 5: Heavyweight Tournament Quarterfinal.
Win	5–0 (1)	William Penn	TKO (punches)	Bellator 38	March 26, 2011	1	2:58	Tunica, Mississippi, United States	
Win	4–0 (1)	Svetoslav Zahariev	Submission (rear-naked choke)	Real Pain Challenge 9	October 9, 2010	1	3:33	Sofia, Bulgaria	
Win	3–0 (1)	Kazuyuki Fujita	Decision (split)	World Victory Road Presents: Sengoku 9	August 2, 2009	3	5:00	Saitama, Japan	
NC	2–0 (1)	Ilir Latifi	NC (ring broke)	Real Pain Challenge 2	May 17, 2008	1	0:55	Sofia, Bulgaria	
Win	2–0	Yancho Dimitrov	TKO (punches)	Real Pain Challenge 1	March 9, 2008	1	2:31	Sofia, Bulgaria	
Win	1–0	Kamen Georgiev	TKO (corner stoppage)	Fitness Mania	October 13, 2007	1	5:00	Pazardzhik, Bulgaria	

== See also ==
- List of Bellator MMA alumni
