= Karl Albrektsson =

Swedish mixed martial artist

- Born: September 27, 1993 (age 33); Sollentuna Municipality, Sweden
- Other names: King
- Height: 6 ft 2 in (1.88 m)
- Weight: 205 lb (93 kg; 14.6 st)
- Division: Light Heavyweight
- Reach: 75.5 in (192 cm)
- Style: Sanda
- Fighting out of: Stockholm, Sweden
- Team: Pancrase Gym Sweden; CSW Training Center (grappling)
- Years active: 2012–present

Mixed martial arts record
- Total: 22
- Wins: 14
- By knockout: 7
- By submission: 3
- By decision: 4
- Losses: 8
- By knockout: 5
- By submission: 1
- By decision: 2

Other information
- Website: https://twitter.com/karlalbrektsson
- Mixed martial arts record from Sherdog

Karl Albrektsson (born September 27, 1993) is a Swedish mixed martial arts fighter, competing in the Light Heavyweight division. He has been performing at a professional level since 2012, and he is also known for his participation in the tournaments of fighting organizations Bellator MMA and Rizin FF.

== Background ==
Albrektsson was born and raised in Stockholm. As a teenager, he easily got into trouble, but tried to keep himself in the loop via hockey and boxing. Hockey, which is also a physical sport, suited him well, already as a 15-year-old he was 1.88 tall and weighed over 90 kilos.

In March 2019, he said in an interview that he wanted to wait with the UFC debut and why he did not aim for UFC Stockholm. He would like to have more experience and "be as mature as he can" when he debuts there.

== Wushu ==
In 2014, Albrektsson participated in Wushu - European Championships in Bucharest and won Sweden's first European Championship gold on the men's side.

== MMA ==
=== Early career ===
Albrektsson made his debut in the Polish organization MMA Koszalin and won his first match via finish in the second round. It took a little over a year after the debut before the next match ended.

=== International Ring Fight Arena ===
Albrektsson started playing matches within the Swedish organization IRFA in 2013 and went undefeated, 3–0, through his time with them for a total result of 4–0 and was then picked up by the Japanese organization Rizin FF.

=== Rizin Fighting Federation ===
He made his debut on 17 April 2016 in Rizin 1, played a hard and even match against the Russian sambo world champion and later Bellator champion, Vadim Nemkov who Albrektsson finally defeated via a split decision.

On September 25 of the same year, Karl faced Valentin Moldavsky at Rizin World Grand Prix 2016: 2nd RoundMoldavsky was the first to defeat Albrektsson in the latter's professional career. He did so by unanimous decision in an open-weight bout.

Just over ten months later, it was time for Karl's next bout on July 30, 2017, at Rizin Fighting World Grand Prix 2017 Opening Round Part 1. This time against Lithuania Teodoras Aukstuolis who Albrektsson defeated via submission.

At the World Grand Prix second match of the tournament on December 29, 2017, Albrektsson met Czech Jiří Procházka who defeated him via TKO and knocked him out of the tournament.

After that match, according to Albrektsson himself, he and Rizin had some trouble agreeing on matches. Instead, Karl competed at Superior Challenge at SC 17 against Dmitry Tebekin and at SC 18 on December 1, 2018, against Josh Stansbury. He defeated both via stoppage

Albrektsson was supposed to meet Conor McGregor's club mate, Irishman Chris Fields 11 May at SC 19, but on May 3, 2019, it was reported that Albrektsson was forced to withdraw from the match due to injuries.

His next bout for Rizin came against Wanderlei Silva's student Christiano Frohlich at Rizin 15 on April 21, 2019, which Albrektsson won by unanimous decision.

=== Bellator MMA / PFL MMA ===
On July 30, 2019, it was announced that Albrektsson was signed to Bellator MMA. Bellator was in contact with Albrektsson already in 2013, but he wanted to get a little more experience before signing for a larger organization and therefore waited until 2019.

Albrektsson debuted in the organization on October 25, 2019, at Bellator 231 against former Light heavyweight Phil Davis in the co-main bout. Davis relied on his wrestling background and took down Albrektsson in rounds 1 and 2. In round 3, Davis beat Albrektsson with body blow and finished Albrektsson against the cage.

Albrektsson faced Viktor Nemkov, the brother of his previous opponent, at Bellator 257 on April 16, 2021. He won the bout via unanimous decision.

Albrektsson was scheduled to face Julius Anglickas on October 16, 2021, at Bellator 268. After Anglickas replaced Anthony Johnson in the LHW Grand Prix, Albrektsson instead faced Dovletdzhan Yagshimuradov. He won by unanimous decision.

As the first fight of his new multi-fight, multi-year contract, Albrektsson faced Karl Moore on September 23, 2022, at Bellator 285. He lost the fight via face crank submission in the second round.

Albrektsson faced Grant Neal on February 4, 2023, at Bellator 290. He lost the bout via split decision. 4 out of 6 media scores gave it to Albrektsson.

After winning the Superior Challenge Light Heavyweight title against Ederson Cristian Macedo via first round TKO stoppage at Superior Challenge 26 on November 4, 2023, Albrektsson was set to defend his title against PFL veteran Daniel Spohn on May 25, 2024 at Superior Challenge 27. However, the event was cancelled due to situation involving Viaplay.

Albrektsson was scheduled to face Laurynas Urbonavicius on June 21, 2024 at PFL 5. however Urbonavicius pulled out and was replaced by Ibragim Chuzhigaev. In turn, Chuzhigaev pulled out and was replaced by Andrew Sanchez.

Albrektsson was scheduled to face Antônio Carlos Júnior on August 16, 2024 at PFL 8. However the week of the bout, Albrektsson pulled out for unknown reasons.

On March 4, 2025, the promotion officially revealed that Albrektsson will join the 2025 PFL Light Heavyweight Tournament.

In the quarterfinal, Albrektsson faced Simeon Powell on May 1, 2025, at PFL 4. He lost the fight by technical knockout in the second round.

Albrektsson returned to the tournament in an alternate bout as he faced PFL newcomer Rafael Xavier at PFL 7 on June 27, 2025. He lost the fight via TKO in the first round.

== Mixed martial arts record ==
Professional record breakdown
22 matches	14 wins	8 losses
By knockout	7	5
By submission	3	1
By decision	4	2

Res.	Record	Opponent	Method	Event	Date	Round	Time	Location	Notes
Loss	14–8	Rafael Xavier	TKO (punches)	PFL 7 (2025)	June 27, 2025	1	0:27	Chicago, Illinois, United States	2025 PFL Light Heavyweight Tournament Alternate bout.
Loss	14–7	Simeon Powell	TKO (elbows and punches)	PFL 4 (2025)	May 1, 2025	2	2:05	Orlando, Florida, United States	2025 PFL Light Heavyweight Tournament Quarterfinal.
Loss	14–6	Chuck Campbell	KO (punches)	Superior Challenge 27	November 30, 2024	2	3:13	Stockholm, Sweden	Lost the SC Light Heavyweight Championship.
Win	14–5	Ederson Cristian Macedo	TKO (punches)	Superior Challenge 26	November 4, 2023	1	3:16	Stockholm, Sweden	Won the SC Light Heavyweight Championship.
Loss	13–5	Grant Neal	Decision (split)	Bellator 290	February 4, 2023	3	5:00	Inglewood, California, United States	
Loss	13–4	Karl Moore	Submission (face crank)	Bellator 285	September 23, 2022	2	3:36	Dublin, Ireland	
Win	13–3	Dovletdzhan Yagshimuradov	Decision (unanimous)	Bellator 268	October 16, 2021	3	5:00	Phoenix, Arizona, United States	
Win	12–3	Vladimir Mishchenko	TKO (punches)	Superior Challenge 22	May 29, 2021	1	3:46	Stockholm, Sweden	
Win	11–3	Viktor Nemkov	Decision (unanimous)	Bellator 257	April 16, 2021	3	5:00	Uncasville, Connecticut, United States	
Win	10–3	Amilcar Alves	TKO (punches)	Superior Challenge 21	November 28, 2020	2	2:46	Stockholm, Sweden	
Loss	9–3	Phil Davis	TKO (punches and elbows)	Bellator 231	October 25, 2019	3	3:06	Uncasville, Connecticut, United States	
Win	9–2	Christiano Frohlich	Decision (unanimous)	Rizin 15	April 21, 2019	3	5:00	Yokohama, Japan	
Win	8–2	Josh Stansbury	KO (punches)	Superior Challenge 18	December 1, 2018	1	4:56	Stockholm, Sweden	
Win	7–2	Dmitry Tebekin	TKO (punches)	Superior Challenge 17	May 19, 2018	2	4:52	Stockholm, Sweden	
Loss	6–2	Jiří Procházka	TKO (punches)	Rizin World Grand Prix 2017: 2nd Round	December 29, 2017	1	9:57	Saitama, Japan	
Win	6–1	Teodoras Aukstuolis	Submission (arm-triangle choke)	Rizin World Grand Prix 2017 Opening Round - Part 1	July 30, 2017	1	8:01	Saitama, Japan	
Loss	5–1	Valentin Moldavsky	Decision (unanimous)	Rizin World Grand Prix 2016: 1st Round	September 25, 2016	2	5:00	Saitama, Japan	2016 Rizin Openweight Grand Prix First Round.
Win	5–0	Vadim Nemkov	Decision (split)	Rizin 1	April 17, 2016	3	5:00	Nagoya, Japan	
Win	4–0	Tomasz Janiszewski	Submission (rear-naked choke)	International Ring Fight Arena 7	November 24, 2014	2	4:37	Solna, Sweden	
Win	3–0	Nordine Hadjar	KO (punches)	International Ring Fight Arena 6	April 5, 2014	1	2:29	Solna, Sweden	
Win	2–0	Arunas Vilius	Submission (rear-naked choke)	International Ring Fight Arena 5	October 19, 2013	1	2:34	Solna, Sweden	
Win	1–0	Blazej Nagorski	TKO (punches)	MMA Koszalin: Poland vs. Sweden	August 17, 2012	2	3:54	Koszalin, Poland	

== See also ==
- List of male mixed martial artists
