= Timothy Johnson (fighter) =

American mixed martial artist

- Born: March 13, 1985 (age 41); Lamberton, Minnesota, United States
- Height: 6 ft 3 in (1.91 m)
- Weight: 264 lb (120 kg; 18.9 st)
- Division: Heavyweight
- Reach: 78 in (198 cm)
- Fighting out of: Fargo, North Dakota, United States
- Team: Academy of Combat Arts; Xtreme Couture
- Wrestling: NCAA Division II Wrestling
- Years active: 2010–present

Mixed martial arts record
- Total: 31
- Wins: 18
- By knockout: 10
- By submission: 3
- By decision: 5
- Losses: 13
- By knockout: 7
- By submission: 3
- By decision: 3

Other information
- University: Minnesota State University Moorhead
- Mixed martial arts record from Sherdog

Timothy Johnson (born March 13, 1985) is an American mixed martial artist currently competing in the Heavyweight division. A professional competitor since 2010, he has also competed for the UFC and Bellator MMA.

== Mixed martial arts career ==
After completing his collegiate career as a two-time All-American wrestler at Division II Minnesota State University Moorhead, Johnson made his professional mixed martial arts debut in October 2010. He competed primarily for regional organizations around his adopted home of North Dakota. He amassed a record of 7–1, finishing all of his opponents, before signing with the UFC on the heels of a first round finish of Travis Wiuff in October 2014.

=== Ultimate Fighting Championship ===
Johnson made his promotional debut against Shamil Abdurakhimov on April 4, 2015, at UFC Fight Night 63. He won the fight via TKO in the final seconds of the first round.

Johnson next faced Jared Rosholt on August 8, 2015, at UFC Fight Night 73. Despite staggering and nearly finishing Rosholt with strikes in the last minute of the fight, Johnson lost the fight via unanimous decision.

Johnson faced promotional newcomer Marcin Tybura on April 10, 2016, at UFC Fight Night 86. He won the fight via unanimous decision.

Johnson next faced Alexander Volkov on November 19, 2016, at UFC Fight Night 99. Volkov was awarded a controversial split decision victory. 12 out of 12 media scores gave the bout to Johnson.

Johnson faced Daniel Omielańczuk on March 18, 2017, at UFC Fight Night 107. He won the back and forth fight by split decision (28–29, 30–27, and 29–28).

Johnson faced promotional newcomer Júnior Albini on July 22, 2017, at UFC on Fox 25. He lost the fight via TKO in the first round.

Johnson faced Marcelo Golm on February 3, 2018, at UFC Fight Night 125. He won the fight via unanimous decision. The fight marked the last bout of his prevailing contract, and the UFC opted not to renew it.

=== Bellator MMA ===
On April 13, 2018, it was revealed that Johnson had signed a multi-fight contract with Bellator MMA.

Johnson made his debut against Cheick Kongo on October 13, 2018, at Bellator 208. He lost the fight via knockout in the first round.

Johnson was scheduled to face Azunna Anyanwu in the prelims of Bellator 225 on August 24, 2019. However, on the day of the fight, it was announced that Johnson would fill in for Javy Ayala and face former Bellator Heavyweight champion Vitaly Minakov in the co main event. He lost the fight via knockout in the first round.

Johnson next faced Tyrell Fortune at Bellator 239 on February 21, 2020. He won the fight by knockout in the first round.

Johnson next faced Matt Mitrione on August 7, 2020, at Bellator 243. He won the fight via technical knockout in the first round.

On October 10, 2020, Johnson rematched Cheick Kongo at Bellator 248 in Paris, France. He would avenge his previous loss to Kongo with a split-decision victory.

With heavyweight champion Ryan Bader moving on in the Bellator Light Heavyweight World Grand Prix Tournament, Johnson faced Valentin Moldavsky for the Bellator Interim Heavyweight World Championship at Bellator 261 on June 25, 2021. He lost the bout by unanimous decision.

Johnson faced Fedor Emelianenko on October 23, 2021, at Bellator 269. He lost the bout via knockout in the first round.

Johnson was scheduled to rematch Tyrell Fortune on April 15, 2022, at Bellator 277. However, on March 1, 2022, it was announced by Bellator that Johnson was expected to face Linton Vassell and Fortune was set to meet Steve Mowry in the event. Despite rocking Vassell early in the round, Johnson lost the bout via TKO at the end of the first.

Johnson faced Said Sowma on April 21, 2023, at Bellator 294. He won the bout via unanimous decision.

=== Post Bellator ===
Johnson headlined XFC 50 on April 12, 2024 against Darion Abbey. He won by technical knockout in the first round.

=== Professional Fighters League ===
Johnson made his PFL debut on June 13, 2024 as he faced Danilo Marques at PFL 4. He won the bout via TKO in the first round.

Johnson next faced Denis Goltsov in the semifinals of the 2024 Heavyweight tournament at PFL 7 on August 2, 2024, losing the bout via TKO in the first round.

Johnson next stepped in as a short-notice replacement to face Vadim Nemkov at PFL Champions Series 1 on January 25, 2025. He lost the fight via a rear-naked choke submission in the first round.

On March 5, 2025, the promotion officially revealed that Johnson will join the 2025 PFL Heavyweight Tournament.

In the quarterfinal, Johnson faced Alexandr Romanov on May 1, 2025, at PFL 4. He lost the fight via a guillotine choke submission in the first round.

=== Karate Combat ===
Johnson competed in the 8-man "Last Man Standing" heavyweight tournament July 18, 2025 at Karate Combat 55. Johnson defeated Chase Sherman by knockout in the first round for the first bout, and lost to Robelis Despaigne by technical knockout in the first round for the second bout.

== Championships and accomplishments ==
- Ultimate Fighting Championship
  - Performance of the Night (One time)
- Dakota Fighting Championships
  - Dakota FC Heavyweight Championship (One time)
- MMAJunkie.com
  - 2020 February Knockout of the Month vs. Tyrell Fortune

== Mixed martial arts record ==
Professional record breakdown
31 matches	18 wins	13 losses
By knockout	10	7
By submission	3	3
By decision	5	3

Res.	Record	Opponent	Method	Event	Date	Round	Time	Location	Notes
Loss	18–13	Daniel James	KO (punch)	Gamebred Bareknuckle MMA 10	May 1, 2026	3	1:45	Miami, Florida, United States	Bare Knuckle MMA. 2026 Gamebred FC Heavyweight Tournament Round of 16.
Loss	18–12	Alexander Romanov	Submission (guillotine choke)	PFL 4 (2025)	May 1, 2025	1	1:53	Orlando, Florida, United States	2025 PFL Heavyweight Tournament Quarterfinal.
Loss	18–11	Vadim Nemkov	Submission (rear-naked choke)	PFL Champions Series 1	January 25, 2025	1	3:08	Dubai, United Arab Emirates	
Loss	18–10	Denis Goltsov	TKO (punches)	PFL 7 (2024)	August 2, 2024	1	2:26	Nashville, Tennessee, United States	2024 PFL Heavyweight Tournament Semifinal.
Win	18–9	Danilo Marques	TKO (punches)	PFL 4 (2024)	June 13, 2024	1	3:14	Uncasville, Connecticut, United States	
Win	17–9	Darion Abbey	TKO (punches)	XFC 50	April 12, 2024	1	1:42	Lakeland, Florida, United States	
Win	16–9	Said Sowma	Decision (unanimous)	Bellator 294	April 21, 2023	3	5:00	Honolulu, Hawaii, United States	
Loss	15–9	Linton Vassell	TKO (punches)	Bellator 277	April 15, 2022	1	4:21	San Jose, California, United States	
Loss	15–8	Fedor Emelianenko	KO (punches)	Bellator 269	October 23, 2021	1	1:46	Moscow, Russia	
Loss	15–7	Valentin Moldavsky	Decision (unanimous)	Bellator 261	June 25, 2021	5	5:00	Uncasville, Connecticut, United States	For the interim Bellator Heavyweight World Championship.
Win	15–6	Cheick Kongo	Decision (split)	Bellator 248	October 10, 2020	3	5:00	Paris, France	
Win	14–6	Matt Mitrione	TKO (punches)	Bellator 243	August 7, 2020	1	3:14	Uncasville, Connecticut, United States	
Win	13–6	Tyrell Fortune	KO (punch)	Bellator 239	February 21, 2020	1	2:35	Thackerville, Oklahoma, United States	
Loss	12–6	Vitaly Minakov	KO (punches)	Bellator 225	August 24, 2019	1	1:45	Bridgeport, Connecticut, United States	
Loss	12–5	Cheick Kongo	KO (punches)	Bellator 208	October 13, 2018	1	1:08	Uniondale, New York, United States	
Win	12–4	Marcelo Golm	Decision (unanimous)	UFC Fight Night: Machida vs. Anders	February 3, 2018	3	5:00	Belém, Brazil	
Loss	11–4	Júnior Albini	TKO (punches)	UFC on Fox: Weidman vs. Gastelum	July 22, 2017	1	2:51	Uniondale, New York, United States	
Win	11–3	Daniel Omielańczuk	Decision (split)	UFC Fight Night: Manuwa vs. Anderson	March 18, 2017	3	5:00	London, England	
Loss	10–3	Alexander Volkov	Decision (split)	UFC Fight Night: Mousasi vs. Hall 2	November 19, 2016	3	5:00	Belfast, Northern Ireland	
Win	10–2	Marcin Tybura	Decision (unanimous)	UFC Fight Night: Rothwell vs. dos Santos	April 10, 2016	3	5:00	Zagreb, Croatia	
Loss	9–2	Jared Rosholt	Decision (unanimous)	UFC Fight Night: Teixeira vs. Saint Preux	August 8, 2015	3	5:00	Nashville, Tennessee, United States	
Win	9–1	Shamil Abdurakhimov	TKO (punches)	UFC Fight Night: Mendes vs. Lamas	April 4, 2015	1	4:57	Fairfax, Virginia, United States	Abdurakhimov was deducted one point in round 1 due to grabbing the fence. Performance of the Night.
Win	8–1	Travis Wiuff	TKO (punches)	Dakota FC 19	October 25, 2014	1	3:36	Fargo, North Dakota, United States	Defended the Dakota FC Heavyweight Championship.
Win	7–1	Kevin Asplund	Submission (front choke)	Beatdown at 4 Bears 11	June 7, 2014	1	2:41	New Town, North Dakota, United States	Defended the Dakota FC Heavyweight Championship.
Win	6–1	Brett Murphy	TKO (slam and punches)	Dakota FC 18	April 26, 2014	2	1:17	Fargo, North Dakota, United States	Defended the Dakota FC Heavyweight Championship.
Win	5–1	Brian Heden	TKO (punches)	Dakota FC 17	January 11, 2014	2	2:56	Fargo, North Dakota, United States	Won the Dakota FC Heavyweight Championship.
Win	4–1	Scott Hough	Submission (arm-triangle choke)	Max Fights 18	October 26, 2013	1	4:56	Fargo, North Dakota, United States	
Win	3–1	Dean Lamb	TKO (submission to punches)	Max Fights 17	March 23, 2013	1	0:34	Fargo, North Dakota, United States	
Win	2–1	Shane DeZee	Submission (americana)	Max Fights 16	November 17, 2012	1	0:49	Fargo, North Dakota, United States	
Loss	1–1	Lance Peterson	Submission (kimura)	Max Fights 13	March 19, 2011	2	2:52	Fargo, North Dakota, United States	
Win	1–0	Travis Wiley	TKO (punchhes)	Max Fights 11	October 30, 2010	1	2:23	Fargo, North Dakota, United States	Heavyweight debut.

== Karate Combat record ==
Professional record breakdown
2 matches	1 win	1 loss
By knockout	1	1
By decision	0	0

Res.	Record	Opponent	Method	Event	Date	Round	Time	Location	Notes
Loss	1–1	Robelis Despaigne	TKO (punches)	Karate Combat 55	July 18, 2025	1	0:20	Miami, Florida, United States	Last Man Standing Semifinal.
Win	1–0	Chase Sherman	TKO (punches)	Karate Combat 55	July 18, 2025	1	0:26	Miami, Florida, United States	Last Man Standing Quarterfinal.

== See also ==
- List of male mixed martial artists
