= Linton Vassell =

English mixed martial arts fighter

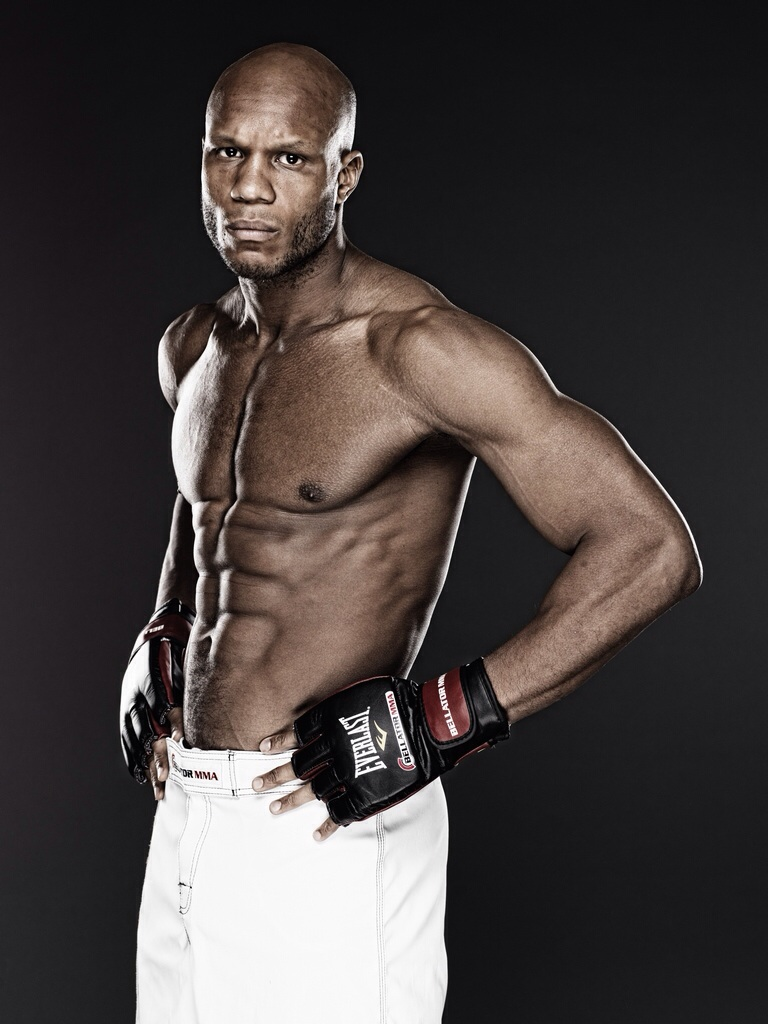
- Born: 3 June 1983 (age 43); Milton Keynes, England
- Other names: The Swarm
- Height: 6 ft 4 in (193 cm)
- Weight: 241 lb (109 kg; 17 st 3 lb)
- Division: Heavyweight; Light Heavyweight
- Reach: 82 in (208 cm)
- Fighting out of: Milton Keynes, England
- Team: BST Academy; Kill Cliff FC
- Years active: 2008–present

Mixed martial arts record
- Total: 36
- Wins: 25
- By knockout: 10
- By submission: 9
- By decision: 6
- Losses: 10
- By knockout: 5
- By submission: 1
- By decision: 4
- No contests: 1

Other information
- Mixed martial arts record from Sherdog
- Last updated on: 27 February 2012

Linton Vassell (born 3 June 1983) is an English mixed martial artist, who currently competes in the Heavyweight division of the Professional Fighters League. A professional since 2008, he has also competed for UCMMA and Cage Warriors. He is the former UCMMA Light Heavyweight Champion.

== Mixed martial arts career ==
=== Early career ===
Vassell started training in mixed martial arts at the age of 23 in 2007 in Milton Keynes. After training for six months he won his first amateur fight against opponent Ian Tobell in October 2007, three weeks later he was fighting for the AMMA Championship Title against Danny Hudson, a fight he won by submission.

Vassell fought Stav Economou to a decision loss for the vacant UWC Heavyweight Championship.

After winning his next fight, he went to Cage Warriors where he meet Simon Carlsen, he defeated Carlsen by decision at Cage Warriors 41.

After winning two fights on UCMMA he went on to win the UCMMA Light Heavyweight Championship.

=== UCMMA Light Heavyweight Championship reign ===
On 4 February 2012, Vassell defeated Aurelijus Kerpe to become the new UCMMA Light Heavyweight Champion which was made vacant after Jimi Manuwa signed to BAMMA.

He successfully defended his title for the first time when he defeated Nick Chapman by submission early into the second round.

Linton Vassell fought Zelg Galesic for UCMMA Light Heavyweight Championship on 2 February 2013. Zelg opened the fight with impressive striking, but Vassell moved the fight on the ground where he dominated Galesic and won the fight by first-round TKO to retain the UCMMA Light Heavyweight Championship.

=== BAMMA ===
Vassell was scheduled to face Jason Jones at BAMMA 11, but had to pull out due to injury.

=== Bellator MMA ===
On 7 August 2013 Bellator announced that Vassell has signed a contract with the promotion. He made his debut against Matt Jones on 8 November 2013 at Bellator 107. Vassell won the fight via unanimous decision.

Vassell returned to the Bellator cage on 28 March 2014 at Bellator 114, he faced Trevor Carlson. Vassell won via rear-naked choke submission in the second round.

In his next appearance for Bellator, Vassell faced Virgil Zwicker at Bellator 122 on 25 July 2014. Vassell won via submission in the first round.

Vassell challenged Emanuel Newton for his light heavyweight title at Bellator 130 on 24 October 2014. Despite winning the first two rounds of the fight due to a dominant ground game, Vassell lost the fight via submission in the fifth round.

Vassell faced UFC and PRIDE veteran Sokoudjou on 27 February 2015 at Bellator 134. He won the fight by TKO in the second round.

Vassell was next a participant in Bellator's one-night Light Heavyweight tournament at Bellator MMA & Glory: Dynamite 1 on 19 September 2015. He faced Muhammed Lawal in the opening round and lost via unanimous decision.

Vassell had a rematch with Emanuel Newton on 19 February 2016 at Bellator 149. He won the fight via unanimous decision.

Vassell was supposed to fight Francis Carmont at Bellator 158 but a cut over his left eye forced him to withdraw. The bout was re-booked for Bellator 165 on 19 November 2016. He won the fight by unanimous decision.

Vassell faced Liam McGeary at Bellator 179 on 19 May 2017. He won the fight via arm-triangle choke submission in the third round and, thus, becoming the first fighter to finish McGeary.

After a three-fight winning streak, Vassell faced newly crowned light heavyweight champion, Ryan Bader, at Bellator 186 on 3 November 2017. He lost the fight via TKO in the second round.

Vassell faced Phil Davis on 25 May 2018 at Bellator 200. He lost the fight via knock out due to a head kick in round three.

Vassell faced Valentin Moldavsky on March 22, 2019, at Bellator 218, where he lost by unanimous decision.

Vassell headlined Bellator 234 against Sergei Kharitonov on 14 November 2019. He won the fight via TKO in the second round.

Vassell faced Ronny Markes at Bellator 254 on 10 December 2020. He won the fight via TKO in the second round.

Vassell was expected to face Marcelo Golm on July 16, 2021, at Bellator 262. On July 12, the bout was scratched after Vassell suffered an injury.

Vassell faced Tyrell Fortune on November 12, 2021, at Bellator 271. In a highly competitive affair, Vassell won the bout via split decision. 5 out of 6 media scores gave it to Vassell.

Vassell faced Timothy Johnson on April 15, 2022, at Bellator 277. After getting rocked early, Vassell completed the comeback and won the bout via TKO at the end of the first.

After the victory, Vassell signed a new 6 bout deal.

Vassell rematched Valentin Moldavsky on March 10, 2023, at Bellator 292. He won the bout in the first round, dropping Moldavsky and knocking him out with elbows from mount.

Vassell was scheduled to face reigning champion Ryan Bader in a rematch for the Bellator Heavyweight Championship on 7 October 2023, at Bellator 300. However, Vassell withdrew a few days before the event due to illness and the bout was cancelled.

=== Professional Fighters League ===
==== 2024 ====
Vassell debuted with the Professional Fighters League (PFL) at PFL 1 on April 4, 2024, and lost the fight to Denis Goltsov by technical knockout.

Vassell faced Valentin Moldavsky in a rematch on June 13, 2024, at PFL 4. He won the fight via split decision.

Vassell, as a replacement for Valentin Moldavsky, faced Oleg Popov in the semifinals of the 2024 Heavyweight tournament at PFL 7 on August 2, 2024, losing the bout via unanimous decision.

==== 2025 ====
On March 5, 2025, the promotion officially revealed that Vassell was to join the 2025 PFL Heavyweight Tournament.

In the quarterfinal, Vassell was scheduled to face Oleg Popov in a rematch on May 1, 2025, at PFL 4. However, on April 28, it was announced Vassell has pulled out of the bout and was replaced by Karl Williams.

==== 2026 ====
Vassell faced José Augusto Azevedo on March 20, 2026, at PFL Madrid: van Steenis vs. Edwards 2. He won the bout via TKO in the second round.

== Championships and Accomplishments ==
- Olympian MMA Championships
  - OMMAC British Light Heavyweight Championship (One Time)
- Ultimate Challenge MMA
  - UCMMA Light Heavyweight Championship (One Time)

== Mixed martial arts record ==
Professional record breakdown
| 37 matches | 26 wins | 10 losses |
| By knockout | 11 | 5 |
| By submission | 9 | 1 |
| By decision | 6 | 4 |
| No contests | 1 | |

| Res. | Record | Opponent | Method | Event | Date | Round | Time | Location | Notes |
|---|---|---|---|---|---|---|---|---|---|
| Win | 26–10 (1) | José Augusto Azevedo | TKO (punches and elbows) | PFL Madrid: van Steenis vs. Edwards 2 | March 20, 2026 | 2 | 2:48 | Madrid, Spain | |
| Loss | 25–10 (1) | Oleg Popov | Decision (unanimous) | PFL 7 (2024) | August 2, 2024 | 3 | 5:00 | Nashville, Tennessee, United States | 2024 PFL Heavyweight Tournament Semifinal. |
| Win | 25–9 (1) | Valentin Moldavsky | Decision (split) | PFL 4 (2024) | June 13, 2024 | 3 | 5:00 | Uncasville, Connecticut, United States | |
| Loss | 24–9 (1) | Denis Goltsov | TKO (punches) | PFL 1 (2024) | April 4, 2024 | 3 | 3:11 | San Antonio, Texas, United States | |
| Win | 24–8 (1) | Valentin Moldavsky | KO (punches and elbows) | Bellator 292 | March 10, 2023 | 1 | 3:03 | San Jose, California, United States | |
| Win | 23–8 (1) | Timothy Johnson | TKO (punches) | Bellator 277 | April 15, 2022 | 1 | 4:21 | San Jose, California, United States | |
| Win | 22–8 (1) | Tyrell Fortune | Decision (split) | Bellator 271 | November 12, 2021 | 3 | 5:00 | Hollywood, Florida, United States | |
| Win | 21–8 (1) | Ronny Markes | TKO (punches) | Bellator 254 | December 10, 2020 | 2 | 3:37 | Uncasville, Connecticut, United States | |
| Win | 20–8 (1) | Sergei Kharitonov | TKO (punches) | Bellator 234 | November 15, 2019 | 2 | 3:15 | Tel Aviv, Israel | |
| Loss | 19–8 (1) | Valentin Moldavsky | Decision (unanimous) | Bellator 218 | March 22, 2019 | 3 | 5:00 | Thackerville, Oklahoma, United States | Return to Heavyweight. |
| Loss | 19–7 (1) | Phil Davis | KO (head kick) | Bellator 200 | May 25, 2018 | 3 | 1:05 | London, England | |
| Loss | 19–6 (1) | Ryan Bader | TKO (punches) | Bellator 186 | November 3, 2017 | 2 | 3:58 | University Park, Pennsylvania, United States | For the Bellator Light Heavyweight World Championship. |
| Win | 19–5 (1) | Liam McGeary | Submission (arm-triangle choke) | Bellator 179 | May 19, 2017 | 3 | 2:28 | London, England | |
| Win | 18–5 (1) | Francis Carmont | Decision (unanimous) | Bellator 165 | November 19, 2016 | 3 | 5:00 | San Jose, California, United States | |
| Win | 17–5 (1) | Emanuel Newton | Decision (unanimous) | Bellator 149 | February 19, 2016 | 3 | 5:00 | Houston, Texas, United States | |
| Loss | 16–5 (1) | Muhammed Lawal | Decision (unanimous) | Bellator 142: Dynamite 1 | September 19, 2015 | 2 | 5:00 | San Jose, California, United States | Bellator Light Heavyweight Tournament Semifinal. |
| Win | 16–4 (1) | Rameau Thierry Sokoudjou | TKO (punches) | Bellator 134 | February 27, 2015 | 2 | 3:18 | Uncasville, Connecticut, United States | |
| Loss | 15–4 (1) | Emanuel Newton | Submission (rear-naked choke) | Bellator 130 | 24 October 2014 | 5 | 0:47 | Mulvane, Kansas, United States | For the Bellator Light Heavyweight World Championship. |
| Win | 15–3 (1) | Virgil Zwicker | Submission (rear-naked choke) | Bellator 122 | July 25, 2014 | 1 | 1:07 | Temecula, California, United States | |
| Win | 14–3 (1) | Trevor Carlson | Submission (rear-naked choke) | Bellator 114 | March 28, 2014 | 2 | 1:54 | Salt Lake City, Utah, United States | |
| Win | 13–3 (1) | Matt Jones | Decision (unanimous) | Bellator 107 | November 8, 2013 | 3 | 5:00 | Thackerville, Oklahoma, United States | |
| Win | 12–3 (1) | Zelg Galešic | TKO (punches) | Ultimate Challenge MMA 32 | February 2, 2013 | 1 | 4:31 | London, England | Defended the UCMMA Light Heavyweight Championship. |
| Win | 11–3 (1) | Nick Chapman | Submission (rear-naked choke) | Ultimate Challenge MMA 29 | August 18, 2012 | 2 | 0:55 | London, England | Defended the UCMMA Light Heavyweight Championship. |
| Win | 10–3 (1) | Aurelijus Kerpe | Submission (armbar) | Ultimate Challenge MMA 26 | February 4, 2012 | 1 | 3:16 | London, England | Won the UCMMA Light Heavyweight Championship. |
| Win | 9–3 (1) | Zsolt Balla | TKO (punches) | Ultimate Warrior Challenge 17 | October 8, 2011 | 1 | 2:09 | Essex, England | |
| Win | 8–3 (1) | Simon Carlsen | Decision (unanimous) | Cage Warriors 41 | April 24, 2011 | 3 | 5:00 | London, England | |
| Win | 7–3 (1) | Rolandas Cizauskas | TKO (punches) | Ultimate Challenge MMA 18 | February 5, 2011 | 1 | 4:21 | London, England | |
| Loss | 6–3 (1) | Matti Mäkelä | TKO (punches) | Superior Challenge 6 | October 29, 2010 | 3 | 4:10 | Stockholm, Sweden | |
| NC | 6–2 (1) | Adrian Preda | NC (accidental eye poke) | Ultimate Challenge MMA 16 | October 23, 2010 | 1 | N/A | London, England | Accidental eye poke rendered Preda unable to continue. |
| Win | 6–2 | Kevin Thompson | Submission (rear-naked choke) | OMMAC 5 | June 5, 2010 | 1 | 4:21 | Liverpool, England | Won the OMMAC British Light Heavyweight Championship. |
| Win | 5–2 | Nick Nembherd | TKO (punches) | Ultimate Warrior Challenge 12 | March 20, 2010 | 1 | 2:49 | Essex, England | Return to Light Heavyweight. |
| Loss | 4–2 | Stav Economou | Decision (unanimous) | Ultimate Warrior Challenge 11 | November 28, 2009 | 3 | 5:00 | Essex, England | For the UWC Heavyweight Championship. |
| Win | 4–1 | Svajunas Siacuila | Submission (keylock) | Ultimate Warrior Challenge 10 | June 28, 2009 | 1 | 0:48 | Essex, England | |
| Win | 3–1 | Reza Mahdavian | TKO (punches) | Ultimate Warrior Challenge 9 | March 22, 2009 | 1 | 2:35 | Essex, England | |
| Loss | 2–1 | Shola Adeniran | TKO (punches) | Ultimate Warrior Challenge 8 | November 8, 2008 | 3 | 3:43 | Essex, England | |
| Win | 2–0 | Chris Greig | Submission (rear-naked choke) | FX3: Fight Night 9 | September 13, 2008 | 1 | 3:19 | Reading, England | Heavyweight debut. |
| Win | 1–0 | Marco Motta | Submission (rear-naked choke) | Ultimate Warrior Challenge 6 | March 1, 2008 | 1 | 2:57 | Reading, England | Light Heavyweight debut. |

== See also ==
- List of male mixed martial artists
- Smoking Rocket design new Official website for Linton Vassell
