= Valentin Moldavsky =

Russian mixed martial artist

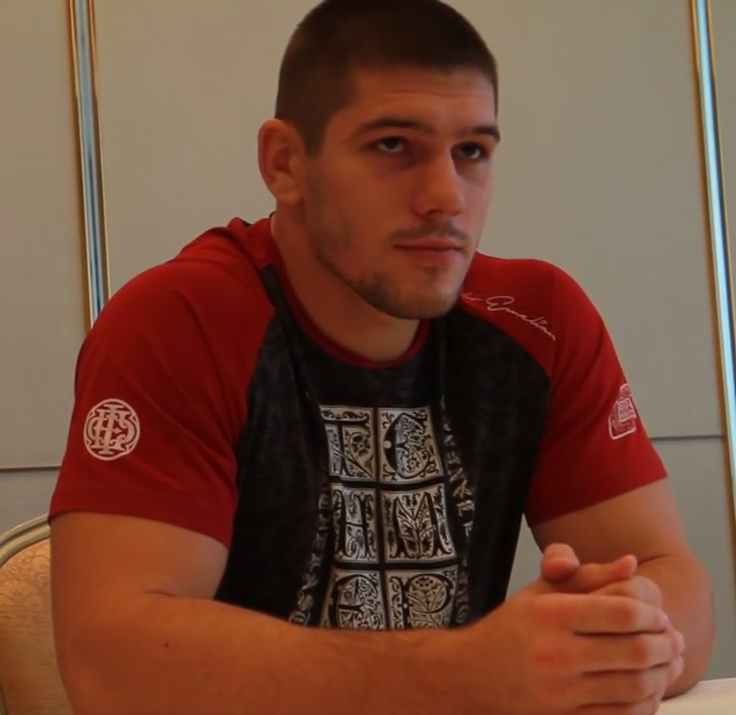
- Moldavsky in 2016
- Born: 6 February 1992 (age 34); Novopskov, Ukraine
- Native name: Валентин Молдавский
- Nationality: Ukrainian (until 2014); Russian (since 2014)
- Height: 6 ft 1 in (185 cm)
- Weight: 243 lb (110 kg; 17 st 5 lb)
- Division: Heavyweight
- Reach: 75 in (191 cm)
- Style: Combat Sambo
- Team: FedorTeam
- Trainer: Fedor Emelianenko
- Years active: 2014–present

Mixed martial arts record
- Total: 22
- Wins: 15
- By knockout: 2
- By submission: 3
- By decision: 10
- Losses: 5
- By knockout: 1
- By decision: 4
- No contests: 2

Other information
- Mixed martial arts record from Sherdog

Valentin Igorevich Moldavsky (Russian: Валентин Игоревич Молдавский; born 6 February 1992) is a Russian mixed martial artist and combat sambo practitioner. He formerly competed for Bellator MMA, where he was an interim Heavyweight World Champion and the Professional Fighters League (PFL). He is also a two-time world and one-time European Sambo Champion in the +100 kg division.

== Biography ==
Moldavsky was born 6 February 1992 in the village of Novopskov in the Luhansk Oblast. He was enrolled at the Luhansk State University of Internal Affairs, working as platoon leader.

== Sambo ==
In 2018, Moldavsky won the European Sambo Championships in Athens, Greece and the World Sambo Championships in Bucharest, Romania in the +100 kg weight category.

He also won the 2020 Russian national Championship, which allowed him to qualify for the 2020 World Sambo Championships in Serbia. He claimed the World Championship in the +100 kg category.

== Mixed martial arts career ==
=== Early career ===
After going undefeated in amateur bouts, Moldavsky had his first professional fight was with Armenian Karen Karapetyan in Omsk on 21 February 2015, beating him with an armlock. Soon after, Moldavsky has been coached by Fedor Emelianenko and joined his Team Fedor.

=== Rizin Fighting Federation ===
In 2016, Moldavsky entered the Rizin Openweight Grand-Prix. In the first round in September 2016, he defeated Karl Albrektsson by unanimous decision to advance. In the quarter-finals on 29 December 2016, he defeated Szymon Bajor by unanimous decision. Two days later, he suffered his first loss to Iranian Amir Aliakbari by decision.

=== Bellator MMA ===
Moldavsky debuted for Bellator MMA at Bellator 181 on 14 July 2017, beating Carl Seumanutafa by unanimous decision.

Moldavsky returned to the promotion on 13 July 2018, knocking out Ernest James in the first round at Bellator 202.

Moldavsky faced Linton Vassell on March 22, 2019 at Bellator 218, winning the bout by unanimous decision.

Moldavsky faced Javy Ayala at Bellator 239 on February 21, 2020. Using takedowns and dominating Ayala on the ground, Moldavsky won the fight by unanimous decision.

In his highest profile fight to date, Moldavsky faced Roy Nelson at Bellator 244 on August 21, 2020. He won the fight by unanimous decision.

With heavyweight champion Ryan Bader moving on in the Bellator Light Heavyweight World Grand Prix Tournament, Moldavsky faced Timothy Johnson for the Bellator Interim Heavyweight World Championship at Bellator 261 on June 25, 2021. He won the bout and the title by unanimous decision.

Moldavsky faced Bellator Heavyweight World Champion Ryan Bader to unify the Heavyweight titles on January 29, 2022 at Bellator 273. He lost the bout via unanimous decision. 7 out of 11 media scores gave it to Moldavsky.

Moldavsky faced Steve Mowry at Bellator 284 on August 12, 2022. Less than a minute into the bout, Moldavsky accidentally eye poked Mowry, rendering him unable to continue, resulting in a no contest.

Moldavsky rematched Linton Vassell on March 10, 2023 at Bellator 292. He lost the bout in the first round, getting dropped on the feet and knocked out by elbows from mount.

Moldavsky had a rematch Steve Mowry on August 11, 2023 at Bellator 298. He won the fight via unanimous decision.

=== Professional Fighters League ===
==== 2024 ====
Moldavsky debuted with the Professional Fighters League (PFL) at PFL 1 on April 4, 2024 and won his bout against Ante Delija via technical knockout with knees and punches.

Moldavsky faced Linton Vassell in a rematch on June 13, 2024 at PFL 4. He lost the fight via split decision.

Moldavsky was scheduled to face Oleg Popov in the semifinals of the 2024 Heavyweight tournament at PFL 7 on August 2, 2024, however he pulled out for unknown reasons.

==== 2025 ====
On March 5, 2025, the promotion officially revealed that Moldavsky joined the 2025 PFL Heavyweight Tournament.

In the quarterfinal, Moldavsky faced Sergey Bilostenniy on May 1, 2025, at PFL 4. He won the fight by unanimous decision.

In the semifinals, Moldavksy faced Alexander Romanov at PFL 7 on June 27, 2025. The bout ended in a no contest after Moldavsky accidentally hit Romanov with a groin strike and he was unable to continue.

In his fight outside PFL, Moldavsky faced Ivan Shtyrkov on December 12, 2025, at "RCC 24". He won the fight via split decision.

==== 2026 ====
Moldavsky was scheduled to face Bruno Cappelozza on July 25, 2026, at PFL Washington DC. However, Cappelozza not compete at this event due to visa issues and the bout was moved to PFL Charlotte on August 7, 2026. Moldavsky lost the bout via unanimous decision.

== Championships and accomplishments ==
- Bellator MMA
  - Interim Bellator Heavyweight World Championship (One time)
- Rizin Fighting Federation
  - 2016 Rizin Openweight Grand Prix Semifinalist

== Mixed martial arts record ==
Professional record breakdown
22 matches	15 wins	5 losses
By knockout	2	1
By submission	3	0
By decision	10	4
No contests	2	

Res.	Record	Opponent	Method	Event	Date	Round	Time	Location	Notes
Loss	15–5 (2)	Bruno Cappelozza	Decision (unanimous)	PFL Charlotte: Battle vs. Rosta	August 7, 2026	3	5:00	Charlotte, North Carolina, United States	
Win	15–4 (2)	Ivan Shtyrkov	Decision (split)	RCC 24	December 12, 2025	3	5:00	Yekaterinburg, Russia	Light Heavyweight debut.
NC	14–4 (2)	Alexander Romanov	NC (accidental knee to groin)	PFL 7 (2025)	June 27, 2025	1	4:26	Chicago, Illinois, United States	2025 PFL Heavyweight Tournament Semifinal. Accidental knee to the groin rendered Romanov unable to continue.
Win	14–4 (1)	Sergey Bilostenniy	Decision (unanimous)	PFL 4 (2025)	May 1, 2025	3	5:00	Orlando, Florida, United States	2025 PFL Heavyweight Tournament Quarterfinal.
Loss	13–4 (1)	Linton Vassell	Decision (split)	PFL 4 (2024)	June 13, 2024	3	5:00	Uncasville, Connecticut, United States	
Win	13–3 (1)	Ante Delija	TKO (knees and punches)	PFL 1 (2024)	April 4, 2024	1	2:17	San Antonio, Texas, United States	
Win	12–3 (1)	Steve Mowry	Decision (unanimous)	Bellator 298	August 11, 2023	3	5:00	Sioux Falls, South Dakota, United States	
Loss	11–3 (1)	Linton Vassell	KO (punches and elbows)	Bellator 292	March 10, 2023	1	3:03	San Jose, California, United States	
NC	11–2 (1)	Steve Mowry	NC (accidental eye poke)	Bellator 284	August 12, 2022	1	0:54	Sioux Falls, South Dakota, United States	Accidental eye poke rendered Mowry unable to continue.
Loss	11–2	Ryan Bader	Decision (unanimous)	Bellator 273	January 29, 2022	5	5:00	Phoenix, Arizona, United States	For the Bellator Heavyweight World Championship.
Win	11–1	Timothy Johnson	Decision (unanimous)	Bellator 261	June 25, 2021	5	5:00	Uncasville, Connecticut, United States	Won the interim Bellator Heavyweight World Championship.
Win	10–1	Roy Nelson	Decision (unanimous)	Bellator 244	August 21, 2020	3	5:00	Uncasville, Connecticut, United States	
Win	9–1	Javy Ayala	Decision (unanimous)	Bellator 239	February 21, 2020	3	5:00	Thackerville, Oklahoma, United States	
Win	8–1	Linton Vassell	Decision (unanimous)	Bellator 218	March 22, 2019	3	5:00	Thackerville, Oklahoma, United States	
Win	7–1	Ernest James	TKO (punches)	Bellator 202	July 13, 2018	2	4:02	Thackerville, Oklahoma, United States	
Win	6–1	Carl Seumanutafa	Decision (unanimous)	Bellator 181	July 14, 2017	3	5:00	Thackerville, Oklahoma, United States	
Loss	5–1	Amir Aliakbari	Decision (split)	Rizin World Grand Prix 2016: Final Round	December 31, 2016	2	5:00	Saitama, Japan	2016 Rizin Openweight Grand Prix Semifinal.
Win	5–0	Szymon Bajor	Decision (unanimous)	Rizin World Grand Prix 2016: 2nd Round	December 29, 2016	2	5:00	Saitama, Japan	2016 Rizin Openweight Grand Prix Quarterfinal.
Win	4–0	Karl Albrektsson	Decision (unanimous)	Rizin World Grand Prix 2016: 1st Round	September 25, 2016	2	5:00	Saitama, Japan	2016 Rizin Openweight Grand Prix First Round.
Win	3–0	Daniel Doerrer	Submission (guillotine choke)	Fight Nights Global 50	June 17, 2016	1	0:47	Saint Petersburg, Russia	
Win	2–0	Yuta Uchida	Submission (rear-naked choke)	Rizin World Grand Prix 2015: Part 1 - Saraba	December 29, 2015	1	2:20	Saitama, Japan	2015 Rizin Heavyweight Grand Prix Reserve bout.
Win	1–0	Karen Karapetyan	Submission (armbar)	Professional Combat Sambo: Eurasian Economic Union	February 21, 2015	1	1:26	Omsk, Russia	Heavyweight debut.

== See also ==
- List of male mixed martial artists
