= Dovletdzhan Yagshimuradov =

Turkmen mixed martial arts fighter

- Born: Döwletjan Ýagşymyradow; May 22, 1989 (age 37); Chardzhev, Turkmen SSR, Soviet Union (now Türkmenabat, Turkmenistan)
- Native name: Döwletjan Gaýbullaýewiç Ýagşymyradow
- Other names: Wolfhound; Turkic Power
- Nationality: Turkmen
- Height: 5 ft 11 in (1.80 m)
- Weight: 205 lb (93 kg; 14 st 9 lb)
- Division: Light heavyweight Heavyweight
- Reach: 72 in (183 cm)
- Fighting out of: Ashgabat, Turkmenistan
- Team: American Top Team
- Years active: 2012–present

Mixed martial arts record
- Total: 36
- Wins: 26
- By knockout: 14
- By submission: 4
- By decision: 8
- Losses: 9
- By knockout: 2
- By submission: 3
- By decision: 4
- Draws: 1

Other information
- Mixed martial arts record from Sherdog

Dovletdzhan Yagshimuradov (Russian: Довлетджан Ягшимурадов; Turkmen: Döwletjan Ýagşymyradow; born 22 May 1989) is a Turkmen mixed martial artist who currently competes in the Light Heavyweight division of the Professional Fighters League (PFL), where he was the 2024 light heavyweight tournament winner. He has previously competed in Bellator MMA (2020-2023). He has also competed in Absolute Championship Akhmat (ACA), where he was the ACA Light Heavyweight Champion. As of August 21, 2026, he is #4 in the PFL light heavyweight rankings.

== Biography ==
Dovletdzhan Yagshimuradov was born in the city of Türkmenabat, but grew up in a nearby village. At the age of six, in addition to going to school-where he studied at the 1st comprehensive school in his native village-he signed up for a karate lessons. After several years of training, Yagshimuradov became one of the best karatekas among his peers, taking the under-11 championship and eventually winning gold at the national level tournament.

In the 7th grade, he switched to kickboxing. Upon reaching the age of eligibility, Yagshimuradov joined the army, and after demobilization, he lived in his homeland for a little less than a year and left for Kharkiv to pursue his college education.

At the age of 17, Yagshimuradov went to serve in the Armed Forces of Turkmenistan. He has the title of senior sergeant.

Yagshimuradov has resided in Kharkiv, Ukraine for the last twelve years, constructing a life with his kin and made a living as a fighter and entrepreneur. He managed two ventures and was a businessman with three different diplomas, including a bachelor's degree in economics and law conferred by Kharkiv National University of Economics in 2015.

In July 2026 Yagshimuradov has been appointed Goodwill Ambassador of the United Nations Friendship Games.

== Mixed martial arts career ==
=== Early career ===
As a student, in 2011, Dovletdzhan began to visit the hall where combat sports were taught. In March 2012, Yagshimuradov was asked to compete at the Oplot Challenge 1 tournament against the Czech Rudolf Kriz, which started the path of the Turkmen fighter in mixed martial arts.

His first fight ended in a draw, and in his next seven performances, Yagshimuradov got 4 wins and 3 losses. This was explained by the fact that, due to inexperience, Dovlet did not think about a sports career, he went to fights on a week's notice, but later the situation changed. At the end of his studies at the university, he went on a five-fight winning streak and had "gold" behind him in the light heavyweight tournament. The native of Chardzhou held his last fight in OC against Magomed Ankalaev, losing to him by decision, and then a serious career rise awaited him.

Having spent one fight under the auspices of the RFP, and knocking out Maxim Kushnerenko in 27 seconds, Yagshimuradov was invited to M-1, where he was defeated by Mikhail Rogozin. The failure was followed by success and, having obtained another victory, with a record of 11-5 and one draw, the fighter signed a contract with Absolute Championship Akhmat.

=== Absolute Championship Akhmat ===
The first fight took place abroad - in Austria at ACB 52, where Dovlet finished Dan Konecki. This was followed by victories over Jared Torgeson at ACB 62 and Joachim Christensen at ACB 75, the knockout of which was marked by a bonus, as the best of the evening.

At ACB 79: Aguev vs. Alfaya, Dovlet faced Luis Fernando Miranda in a title eliminator, defeating Miranda by the way of knockout in just a minute of the fight, and less than 4 months later at ACB 86, a duel for the belt took place. The confrontation with Batraz Agnaev ended in Yagshimuradov submitting Agnaev via rear-naked choke in the third round, winning the bout and ACB Light Heavyweight Championship.

On February 16, 2019, at ACA 92: Yagshimuradov vs. Celiński, Yagshimuradov faced Karol Celińskt for inaugural ACA Light Heavyweight Championship after the league was renamed, winning the bout and title via TKO in round fourth.

On December 14, 2019, at ACA 103: Yagshimuradov vs. Butorin, Dovlet defended the AСA Light Heavyweight title against Alexey Butorin, winning the fight via unanimous decision.

=== Bellator MMA ===
In December 2020, Dovletdzhan signed a contract with the Bellator MMA.

Dovletdzhan was scheduled to made his Bellator debut on April 9, 2021, at Bellator 256 against Corey Anderson in quarterfinal round of Bellator Light Heavyweight Grand Prix. On March 26, it was announced that the bout would be moved to Bellator 257 on April 16. He lost the bout via third-round technical knockout.

Dovletdzhan faced Karl Albektsson at Bellator 268 on October 16, 2021, losing the bout via unanimous decision.

Yagshimuradov was scheduled to face Tony Johnson at Bellator 277 on April 15, 2022. However, due to an injury, Johnson was forced to pull out and was replaced by former Bellator Middleweight Champion Rafael Carvalho. Dovletdzhan won the bout in the second round via TKO.

Dovletdzhan faced Julius Anglickas at Bellator 292 on March 10, 2023. He won the fight via unanimous decision.

Dovletdzhan faced Maciej Różański on October 7, 2023, at Bellator 300. He won the fight by unanimous decision.

=== Professional Fighters League ===
Dovletdzhan started the 2024 season against Jakob Nedoh on April 12, 2024 at PFL 2. He won the fight in the first round by technical knockout.

In his next bout on June 21, 2024 at PFL 5, Dovletdzhan faced Simon Biyong, winning the bout via unanimous decision.

Dovletdzhan faced Rob Wilkinson in the semifinals of the 2024 Light Heavyweight tournament on August 16, 2024 at PFL 8. He won the fight by unanimous decision.

In the final, Yagshimuradov faced Impa Kasanganay on November 29, 2024, at PFL 10. He won the tournament and $1 million prize by knockout in the first round.

Yagshimuradov faced Corey Anderson in a rematch for the inaugural PFL Light Heavyweight Championship on October 3, 2025, at PFL Champions Series 3. He lost the bout via unanimous decision.

Yagshimuradov faced Tyson Pedro on April 16, 2026, at PFL Belfast. He won the fight via unanimous decision.

Yagshimuradov was scheduled to face Simeon Powell on July 31, 2026, at PFL New York. However, the bout was removed from the event after the New York State Athletic Commission declined to license Powell due to a previous surgery. Therefore, the bout was moved to PFL Charlotte on August 7, 2026. Yagshimuradov lost the bout via split decision.

== Championships and accomplishments ==
- Professional Fighters League
  - 2024 PFL Light Heavyweight Championship
- Absolute Championship Akhmat
  - ACA Light Heavyweight Championship (One time; First)
    - One successful title defense
- Absolute Championship Berkut
  - ACB Light Heavyweight Championship (One time; Last)
  - Knockout of the Night (One time) vs. Joachim Christensen on November 25, 2017
- Oplot Challenge
  - OC 2012-2013 Light Heavyweight Tournament Winner

== Mixed martial arts record ==
Professional record breakdown
36 matches	26 wins	9 losses
By knockout	14	2
By submission	4	3
By decision	8	4
Draws	1	

Res.	Record	Opponent	Method	Event	Date	Round	Time	Location	Notes
Loss	26–9–1	Simeon Powell	Decision (split)	PFL Charlotte: Battle vs. Rosta	August 7, 2026	3	5:00	Charlotte, North Carolina, United States	
Win	26–8–1	Tyson Pedro	Decision (unanimous)	PFL Belfast: Kelly vs. Wilson	April 16, 2026	3	5:00	Belfast, Northern Ireland	
Loss	25–8–1	Corey Anderson	Decision (unanimous)	PFL Champions Series 3	October 3, 2025	5	5:00	Dubai, United Arab Emirates	For the inaugural PFL Light Heavyweight Championship.
Win	25–7–1	Impa Kasanganay	KO (punches)	PFL 10 (2024)	November 29, 2024	1	0:58	Riyadh, Saudi Arabia	Won the 2024 PFL Light Heavyweight Tournament.
Win	24–7–1	Rob Wilkinson	Decision (unanimous)	PFL 8 (2024)	August 16, 2024	3	5:00	Hollywood, Florida, United States	2024 PFL Light Heavyweight Tournament Semifinal.
Win	23–7–1	Simon Biyong	Decision (unanimous)	PFL 5 (2024)	June 21, 2024	3	5:00	Salt Lake City, Utah, United States	
Win	22–7–1	Jakob Nedoh	TKO (punches)	PFL 2 (2024)	April 12, 2024	1	2:54	Las Vegas, Nevada, United States	
Win	21–7–1	Maciej Różański	Decision (unanimous)	Bellator 300	October 7, 2023	3	5:00	San Diego, California, United States	
Win	20–7–1	Julius Anglickas	Decision (unanimous)	Bellator 292	March 10, 2023	3	5:00	San Jose, California, United States	
Win	19–7–1	Rafael Carvalho	TKO (elbows and punches)	Bellator 277	April 15, 2022	2	4:04	San Jose, California, United States	
Loss	18–7–1	Karl Albrektsson	Decision (unanimous)	Bellator 268	October 16, 2021	3	5:00	Phoenix, Arizona, United States	
Loss	18–6–1	Corey Anderson	TKO (punches and elbows)	Bellator 257	April 16, 2021	3	2:15	Uncasville, Connecticut, United States	Bellator Light Heavyweight World Grand Prix Quarterfinal.
Win	18–5–1	Alexey Butorin	Decision (unanimous)	ACA 103	December 14, 2019	5	5:00	Saint Petersburg, Russia	Defended the ACA Light Heavyweight Championship.
Win	17–5–1	Karol Celinski	TKO (punches)	ACA 92	February 16, 2019	4	4:16	Warsaw, Poland	Won the inaugural ACA Light Heavyweight Championship.
Win	16–5–1	Batraz Agnaev	Submission (rear-naked choke)	ACB 86	May 5, 2018	3	3:44	Moscow, Russia	Won the ACB Light Heavyweight Championship.
Win	15–5–1	Luis Fernando Miranda	KO (punch)	ACB 79	January 27, 2018	1	1:03	Grozny, Russia	
Win	14–5–1	Joachim Christensen	KO (punch)	ACB 75	November 25, 2017	1	1:14	Stuttgart, Germany	Knockout of the Night.
Win	13–5–1	Jared Torgeson	Submission (rear-naked choke)	ACB 62	June 17, 2017	3	0:39	Rostov-on-Don, Russia	
Win	12–5–1	Dan Konecke	TKO (knee and punches)	ACB 52	January 21, 2017	2	2:44	Vienna, Austria	
Win	11–5–1	Vitaliy Onishchenko	Decision (unanimous)	World Warriors FC: Warriors Honor 2	May 14, 2016	2	5:00	Kharkiv, Ukraine	
Loss	10–5–1	Mikhail Ragozin	TKO (punches)	M-1 Challenge 61	September 20, 2015	3	2:00	Nazran, Russia	
Win	10–4–1	Maxim Kushnerenko	KO (punch)	Real Fight Promotion: West Fight 15	August 28, 2015	1	0:27	Kharkiv, Ukraine	
Loss	9–4–1	Magomed Ankalaev	Decision (unanimous)	Oplot Challenge 103	October 18, 2014	3	5:00	Moscow, Russia	
Win	9–3–1	Fuad Gadirov	KO (punch)	Oplot Challenge 94	December 28, 2013	2	3:59	Kharkov, Ukraine	
Win	8–3–1	Borys Polezhai	TKO (corner stoppage)	Oplot Challenge 86	November 2, 2013	1	2:31	Kharkov, Ukraine	
Win	7–3–1	Arsen Mensitov	TKO (punches)	Oplot Challenge 67	June 20, 2013	1	1:39	Kharkov, Ukraine	
Win	6–3–1	Bogdan Savchenko	Decision (unanimous)	Oplot Challenge 57	May 11, 2013	3	5:00	Kharkov, Ukraine	
Win	5–3–1	Anton Stepanenko	TKO (punches)	Oplot Challenge 55	April 27, 2013	1	0:53	Kharkov, Ukraine	Heavyweight bout.
Loss	4–3–1	Aleksander Boyko	Submission (guillotine choke)	Oplot Challenge 45	March 23, 2013	1	0:17	Kharkov, Ukraine	
Win	4–2–1	Mihail Petkov	Submission (rear-naked choke)	Oplot Challenge 41	March 9, 2013	1	3:07	Kharkov, Ukraine	
Loss	3–2–1	Rashid Yusupov	Submission (armbar)	Oplot Challenge 35	February 16, 2013	2	4:45	Kharkov, Ukraine	
Win	3–1–1	Alexander Barbaryan	Submission (achilles lock)	Oplot Challenge 24	January 5, 2013	1	2:15	Kharkov, Ukraine	Won the Oplot Light Heavyweight Grand Prix.
Win	2–1–1	Sergey Lewandowskiy	TKO (punches)	Oplot Challenge 20	December 21, 2012	1	0:30	Kharkov, Ukraine	Oplot Light Heavyweight Grand Prix Semifinal.
Win	1–1–1	Artur Vartanyan	TKO (punches)	Oplot Challenge 14	November 24, 2012	1	1:57	Kharkov, Ukraine	Return to Light Heavyweight. Oplot Light Heavyweight Tournament Quarterfinal.
Loss	0–1–1	Vasily Babich	Submission (inverted triangle choke)	Oplot Challenge 2	May 13, 2012	2	1:58	Kharkiv, Ukraine	Heavyweight debut.
Draw	0–0–1	Rudolf Kříž	Draw (unanimous)	Oplot Challenge 1	March 25, 2012	2	5:00	Kharkiv, Ukraine	Light Heavyweight debut.

== Actor career ==
In 2022, Yagshimuradov played the role of Balaban Alp in the Turkish television series Kuruluş: Osman Season 3. Balaban Alp is a normal Selcuk soldier who joins Osman and becomes his Alp as he comes with a messenger of Sultan Alaeddin.

=== Television ===
Year	Title	Role
2022–present	Kuruluş: Osman	Balaban

== See also ==
- List of current Bellator MMA fighters
- List of male mixed martial artists

Achievements
Preceded by Impa Kasanganay; Stripped	6th PFL light heavyweight Champion; 29 November 2024 – present	Incumbent
