= Bellator 255 =

Bellator mixed martial arts event in 2021

Bellator 255: Pitbull vs. Sanchez 2
- The poster for Bellator 255: Pitbull vs. Sanchez 2
- Promotion: Bellator MMA
- Date: April 2, 2021
- Venue: Mohegan Sun Arena
- City: Uncasville, Connecticut, United States

Event chronology
Bellator 254: MacFarlane vs. Velasquez	Bellator 255: Pitbull vs. Sanchez 2	Bellator 256: Bader vs. Machida 2

Bellator 255: Pitbull vs. Sanchez 2 was a mixed martial arts event produced by Bellator MMA that took place on April 2, 2021 at Mohegan Sun Arena in Uncasville, Connecticut. The event was Bellator's first of the year following a four-month break after Bellator 254.

== Background ==
This was the first Bellator event to air on Showtime, and the first MMA event to air on the network since the Strikeforce: Marquardt vs. Saffiedine event on January 12, 2013. The event streamed for free in the United States on Pluto TV and YouTube, in addition to Hulu, FuboTV, and participating cable television providers.

The event was headlined by the semi-final of the Bellator Featherweight World Grand Prix Tournament in a rematch between the current champion Patricio Freire and Emmanuel Sanchez. Freire won the last bout at Bellator 209 via unanimous decision.

A bantamweight bout between Jared Scoggins and Magomed Magomedov was scheduled to take place at this event. However, on March 18, Scoggins pulled out of the bout and was replaced by Cee Jay Hamilton.

Matt Mitrione was expected to face Tyrell Fortune at this event. However, during the week of the bout, Mitrione had to pull out and was replaced by Jack May.

Mads Burnell and The Ultimate Fighter: Team McGregor vs. Team Faber standout Saul Rogers was scheduled to fight at this event. However, the bout was cancelled due to visa issues. It eventually took place on April 16, 2021 at Bellator 257.

At weigh-ins, Aguiar missed weight by 1.7 pounds and Faraldo missed weight by .1 pounds. Both were fined a percentage of their purses. Mukhamed Berkhamov missed weight by 2.8 pounds, leading to the bout between him and Herman Terrado being pulled from the lineup due to Berkhamov’s miss.

== Results ==
Main Card (Showtime)
Weight class				Method	Round	Time	Notes
Featherweight	Patricio Freire (c)	def.	Emmanuel Sanchez	Technical Submission (guillotine choke)	1	3:35	(Note: Bellator Featherweight World Grand Prix Semi-Final bout for the Bellator Featherweight World Championship)
Welterweight	Jason Jackson	def.	Neiman Gracie	Decision (unanimous) (29–28, 29–28, 29–28)	3	5:00
Heavyweight	Tyrell Fortune	def.	Jack May	TKO (punches)	1	3:16
Lightweight	Usman Nurmagomedov	def.	Mike Hamel	Decision (unanimous) (29–28, 30–27, 30–27)	3	5:00
Women's Flyweight	Kana Watanabe	def.	Alejandra Lara	Decision (split) (28–29, 29–28, 29–28)	3	5:00
Preliminary card (Youtube/Pluto TV)
Bantamweight	Magomed Magomedov	def.	Cee Jay Hamilton	Submission (rear-naked choke)	2	1:22
Lightweight	Mandel Nallo	def.	Ricardo Seixas	KO (superman punch)	1	3:23
Catchweight (187.7 lb)	Khalid Murtazaliev	def.	Fabio Aguiar	Decision (unanimous) (29–28, 30–27, 30–27)	3	5:00	(Note: Aguiar missed weight and was fined 20% of his purse.)
Catchweight (160 lb)	Chris Gonzalez	def.	Roger Huerta	TKO (submission to punches)	3	3:01
Light Heavyweight	José Augusto Azevedo	def.	Jonathan Wilson	Submission (arm-triangle choke)	1	4:58
Catchweight (171.1 lb)	Roman Faraldo	def.	Trevor Gudde	TKO (punches)	1	1:30	(Note: Faraldo missed weight and was fined 20% of his purse.)
Middleweight	Jordan Newman	def.	Branko Busick	TKO (elbows)	2	2:30

== See also ==
- 2021 in Bellator MMA
- List of Bellator MMA events
- List of current Bellator fighters
