= PFL vs. Bellator =

Mixed martial arts event in 2024

- Promotion(s): Bellator MMA; Professional Fighters League
- Date: February 24, 2024
- City: Riyadh, Saudi Arabia
- Venue: Kingdom Arena

Bellator MMA events chronology
← Previous; Bellator 301: Amosov vs. Jackson	Next → Bellator Champions Series 1: Anderson vs. Moore

PFL events chronology
← Previous; PFL Europe 4	Next → PFL Europe 1

PFL vs. Bellator: Champs was a mixed martial arts event co-promoted by Professional Fighters League and Bellator MMA that took place on February 24, 2024, at the Kingdom Arena in Riyadh, Saudi Arabia.

== Background ==
In November 2023, it was announced that the PFL had acquired rival promotion Bellator MMA. Speculation was that the company would run a champion against champion event in 2024, bolstered by appearances of Bellator MMA champions at PFL's final event of 2023.

A champion versus champion card was announced on January 16, 2024, and scheduled for the following month. Originally, the event was to see four champions from four divisions (heavyweight, middleweight, welterweight, and light heavyweight) defend their titles from their respective organizations. However, two champion versus champion matches were altered leading up to the card:

- 2018 and 2023 PFL welterweight winner Magomed Magomedkerimov was originally announced to face the Bellator Welterweight Champion (also former LFA Welterweight Champion) Jason Jackson at this event. However, Magomedkerimov withdrew from the bout due to injury in January 2024 and was replaced by 2019 and 2021 PFL welterweight winner Ray Cooper III in a 180 pounds catchweight bout.
- A featherweight bout between reigning Bellator Featherweight Champion Patrício Pitbull and 2023 PFL featherweight winner Jesus Pinedo was scheduled for this event; however, Pinedo pulled out a week before the event with a back injury. Pitbull was instead booked against 2023 PFL featherweight finalist Gabriel Alves Braga who was already on the card, while Braga's opponent, Aaron Pico, was booked in a rematch against Henry Corrales. The days of weigh-ins, Braga was deemed unable to compete and the bout was scrapped.

The undercard also included bouts between fighters from the rival promotions, with the following fights being added as well:

- A heavyweight bout between 2021 PFL heavyweight winner Bruno Cappelozza and former Bellator Light Heavyweight Champion (also the Bellator Light Heavyweight World Grand Prix winner) Vadim Nemkov.
- A light heavyweight bout between Thiago Santos and Yoel Romero.
- A lightweight bout between Clay Collard and former Bellator Featherweight Champion (also the Bellator Featherweight World Grand Prix winner) A. J. McKee.
- A featherweight bout between Aaron Pico and 2023 PFL featherweight finalist Gabriel Alves Braga.

In addition, the card featured the MMA return of Claressa Shields and the professional MMA debut of Biaggio Ali Walsh, the grandson of Muhammad Ali who previously competed for PFL in amateur bouts. The bout between Claressa Shields and Kelsey De Santis, which Shields won, was the first professional MMA bout in Saudi Arabia featuring two women.

UFC heavyweight champion Jon Jones made an appearance on the broadcast.

== Results ==
Main card (ESPN+ / DAZN)
Weight class				Method	Round	Time	Notes
Heavyweight	Renan Ferreira	def.	Ryan Bader	TKO (punches)	1	0:21
Middleweight	Johnny Eblen	def.	Impa Kasanganay	Decision (split) (29–28, 28–29, 29–28)	3	5:00
Catchweight (182 lb)	Jason Jackson	def.	Ray Cooper III	TKO (leg kick and punches)	2	0:23
Heavyweight	Vadim Nemkov	def.	Bruno Cappelozza	Technical Submission (arm-triangle choke)	2	2:13	(Note: For "PFL vs. Bellator Champion of Champions" World Light Heavyweight Superfight Championship)
Light Heavyweight	Yoel Romero	def.	Thiago Santos	Decision (unanimous) (30–27, 30–27, 29–28)	3	5:00
Lightweight	A. J. McKee	def.	Clay Collard	Submission (armbar)	1	1:10
Preliminary card (ESPNews / ESPN+)
Featherweight	Aaron Pico	def.	Henry Corrales	TKO (punches)	1	4:53
Lightweight	Biaggio Ali Walsh	def.	Emmanuel Palacio	Decision (unanimous) (30–27, 30–27, 30–27)	3	5:00
Women's Super Lightweight	Claressa Shields	def.	Kelsey DeSantis	Decision (split) (29–28, 28–29, 29–28)	3	5:00
Featherweight	Abdullah Al-Qahtani	def.	Edukondala Rao	TKO (punches and head kick)	3	0:23
Amateur bout
Flyweight	Malik Basahel	def.	Vinicius Pereira	Decision (unanimous) (30–27, 29–28, 30–27)	3	3:00	(Note: Pereira missed weight (129.2 lb).)

== See also ==
- List of current Bellator MMA fighters
- List of current PFL fighters
- 2024 in Bellator MMA
- 2024 in Professional Fighters League
- List of Bellator MMA events
- List of PFL events
- Riyadh Season
