= A. J. McKee =

American mixed martial artist

- Born: Antonio De Carlo McKee Jr. April 7, 1995 (age 31); Long Beach, California, U.S.
- Other names: Mercenary
- Height: 5 ft 10 in (178 cm)
- Weight: 155 lb (70 kg; 11 st 1 lb)
- Division: Lightweight (2022–present); Featherweight (2015–2022, 2025–present)
- Reach: 73 1/2 in (187 cm)
- Fighting out of: Long Beach, California, U.S.
- Team: Team Bodyshop
- Years active: 2015–present

Mixed martial arts record
- Total: 28
- Wins: 25
- By knockout: 6
- By submission: 8
- By decision: 11
- Losses: 3
- By decision: 3

Other information
- Notable relatives: Antonio McKee, father
- Website: ajmckee101.com
- Mixed martial arts record from Sherdog

Antonio De Carlo McKee Jr. (born April 7, 1995) is an American professional mixed martial artist. He currently competes in the Featherweight and Lightweight division of the Professional Fighters League. He formerly competed in Bellator MMA, where he was the Featherweight Champion. As of August 21, 2026, he is #1 in the PFL featherweight rankings and is #6 in the PFL men's pound-for-pound rankings.

== Background ==
The son of former mixed martial artist Antonio McKee and Michelle George, McKee was born and raised in Long Beach, California. McKee graduated from Long Beach Polytechnic High School where he joined the wrestling team. He went on to attend both Notre Dame College and Cerritos College.

== Mixed martial arts career ==
=== Early career ===
McKee went 7–1 as an amateur from 2012 to 2014, before turning professional in 2015. He is coached by his father Antonio McKee and currently trains out of Body Shop Fitness, with the likes of Bubba Jenkins and Emanuel Newton.

=== Bellator MMA ===
==== 2015 ====
In his professional mixed martial arts and promotional debut, McKee faced Marcos Bonilla at Bellator 136 on April 10, 2015. He won the fight via rear-naked choke submission in the first round.

McKee next faced James Barnes at Bellator 141 on August 28, 2015. As Barnes' back was against the cage, McKee landed a hard left hand, resulting in a knockout victory for McKee at 1:42 in the first round.

McKee faced J.T. Donaldson at Bellator 147 on December 4, 2015. He secured his third first-round finish, after a knee and follow-up punches to his hurt opponent prompted a stoppage.

In December 2015, the promotion announced that McKee had signed a multi-year contract extension.

==== 2016 ====
McKee faced Danilo Belluardo at Bellator 152 on April 16, 2016. He won the fight via TKO in the first round.

McKee was next scheduled to face Henry Corrales at Bellator 160 on August 26, 2016. However, Corrales withdrew from the bout due to an injury and was replaced by Cody Walker. He won the fight via submission in the second round.

For his third fight in 2016, McKee was scheduled to face a two-time title contender Emmanuel Sanchez at Bellator 166 on December 2, 2016. However, Sanchez withdrew from the bout due to an injury and was replaced by Ray Wood. He won the fight via unanimous decision.

==== 2017 ====
McKee faced Brandon Phillips at Bellator 171 on January 27, 2017. He won the fight via unanimous decision.

McKee faced Dominic Mazzotta at Bellator 178 on April 21, 2017. He won the fight via knockout due to a head kick just 75 seconds into the first round.

McKee faced Blair Tugman at Bellator 182 on August 25, 2017. He won via unanimous decision and in the process tied the record with Ben Askren and Michael Chandler for the most consecutive wins in Bellator history.

McKee was expected to face Jeremy Petley at Bellator 187 on November 10, 2017. However, after the withdrawal of James Gallagher as a result of an injury, McKee's opponent was changed to Brian Moore. He won the fight via submission in the third round.

==== 2018 ====
McKee faced former UFC competitor Justin Lawrence at Bellator 197 on April 13, 2018. He won the fight via unanimous decision.

At Bellator 205 McKee was expected to headline opposite former featherweight champion Pat Curran. The event took place in Boise, Idaho on September 21. However Curran was pulled due to injury and he was replaced by John Macapá. He won the fight via knockout in round one.

McKee next faced Daniel Crawford at Bellator 212 on December 14, 2018. He won the fight via an anaconda choke submission in the first round.

==== 2019 ====
As the first bout of his new multi-bout contract, McKee's next fight came against former two-time Bellator Featherweight World Champion Pat Curran at Bellator 221 on May 11, 2019. He won the bout via unanimous decision.

==== Bellator Featherweight World Grand Prix ====
McKee faced Georgi Karakhanyan in the opening round of the Bellator Featherweight World Grand Prix on September 28 at Bellator 228. He was victorious via knockout just 8 seconds into the first round, advancing to the next round.

In the quarterfinals, McKee faced Derek Campos at Bellator 236 on December 21, 2019. He won the bout via third round submission to advance in the tournament.

In the semifinals, McKee was set to face Darrion Caldwell at Bellator 244 on June 6, 2020. However, the bout was delayed due to the COVID-19 pandemic. The bout was rescheduled and took place at Bellator 253 on November 19. McKee won the fight via neck crank submission in round one, thus moving on to the Featherweight Grand Prix final.

In the final, McKee faced Bellator Featherweight Champion Patrício Pitbull at Bellator 263 on July 31, 2021, for the Grand Prix Title and $1 million prize. McKee stunned Pitbull with a high kick early in the bout, and secured a guillotine choke winning the bout via submission in round one, claiming the Bellator Featherweight Championship, and $1 million prize in the process. The bout marked McKee's last of his prevailing contract, but becoming the champion triggered a clause which extended the contract by one year or three fights.

==== Bellator Featherweight World Champion ====
As the first title defense of his reign, McKee rematched Patrício Pitbull on April 15, 2022, at Bellator 277. He lost the close bout and the title via unanimous decision, marking the first defeat of his professional career.

==== Lightweight Move ====
Moving up to Lightweight for the first time in his career, McKee faced Spike Carlyle on October 1, 2022, at Bellator 286. At weigh ins, Carlyle missed weight, coming .6 pounds over the division non-title fight limit at 156.6 lbs and was fined 20% of his purse and the bout continued at catchweight. In a wild and bloody bout, McKee came out of it with a unanimous decision victory.

McKee faced reigning Rizin FF Lightweight Champion Roberto de Souza in a non-title bout at Bellator MMA vs. Rizin on December 31, 2022. Although there were many submission attempts made by de Souza, McKee had more offense and won the bout by unanimous decision. Subsequently – with one bout left on his prevailing contract – McKee signed a new six-fight, multi-year contract with Bellator.

==== Lightweight Grand Prix ====
On January 11, 2023, McKee was announced as one of the eight participants in the $1 million Lightweight Grand Prix.

McKee was scheduled face Patricky Pitbull in the Bellator Lightweight World Grand Prix Quarter-Final as part of Bellator MMA x Rizin 2 on July 30, 2023. However, on July 26, it was announced McKee had pulled out of the bout due to an injury, and that he was replaced by Roberto de Souza.

==== Post Grand Prix ====
McKee faced Sidney Outlaw on November 17, 2023, at Bellator 301. Despite being on the bottom for most of the bout, McKee was able to inflict enough damage on Outlaw via the use of elbows to win the unanimous decision.

McKee faced Clay Collard on February 24, 2024, at PFL vs. Bellator. In a quick, fast-paced bout, McKee went for multiple submissions and ended up winning the bout early in the first round by armbar submission.

McKee faced Paul Hughes on October 19, 2024 at PFL Super Fights: Battle of the Giants. He lost the fight by split decision.

==== Return to Featherweight ====
McKee faced Akhmed Magomedov in a featherweight bout on July 19, 2025, at PFL Champions Series 2. He won the bout via unanimous decision.

McKee faced Ádám Borics on March 20, 2026 at PFL Madrid: van Steenis vs. Edwards 2. He won the bout via unanimous decision.

McKee faced Salamat Isbulaev in the main event on June 27, 2026, at PFL San Diego. He won the fight via unanimous decision.

McKee challenged for the Rizin Featherweight Championship and the vacant PFL Featherweight Championship against Rizin champion Razhabali Shaydullaev on September 10, 2026 at Super Rizin 5. He lost the bout by unanimous decision.

== Championships and accomplishments ==
- Bellator MMA
  - Bellator Featherweight World Championship (One time; former)
  - Bellator Featherweight World Grand Prix Tournament (2021)
  - Most consecutive victories in Bellator MMA history (18)
  - Most submission wins in Bellator Featherweight history (7)
  - Tied (Patricio Pitbull) for the most stoppage victories in Bellator Featherweight division history (13)
  - Second most wins in Bellator history (20)
  - Tied (with Michael Chandler) for the second most stoppage victories in Bellator history (13)
  - Tied (with Aaron Pico) for second most knockout victories in Bellator Featherweight division history (6)
- MMA Junkie
  - 2020 November Submission of the Month vs. Darrion Caldwell
  - 2020 Submission of the Year vs. Darrion Caldwell
  - 2021 July Submission of the Month vs. Patrício Freire
- MMA Fighting
  - 2020 "Submission of the Year" vs. Darrion Caldwell
- MMA Mania
  - 2020 "Submission of the Year" vs. Darrion Caldwell
- Combat Press
  - 2020 "Submission of the Year" vs. Darrion Caldwell
- Cageside Press
  - 2020 "Submission of the Year" vs. Darrion Caldwell, tied with Khabib Nurmagomedov and Aljamain Sterling
- Sherdog
  - 2020 Submission of the Year vs. Darrion Caldwell
- Jitsmagazine
  - 2020 MMA Submission of the Year vs. Darrion Caldwell
- Bloody Elbow
  - 2020 Submission of the Year vs. Darrion Caldwell at Bellator 253

== Mixed martial arts record ==
Professional record breakdown
28 matches	25 wins	3 losses
By knockout	6	0
By submission	8	0
By decision	11	3

Res.	Record	Opponent	Method	Event	Date	Round	Time	Location	Notes
Loss	25–3	Razhabali Shaydullaev	Decision (unanimous)	Super Rizin 5	September 10, 2026	3	5:00	Osaka, Japan	For the Rizin Featherweight Championship and the inaugural PFL Featherweight Championship.
Win	25–2	Salamat Isbulaev	Decision (unanimous)	PFL San Diego: McKee vs. Isbulaev	June 27, 2026	3	5:00	San Diego, California, United States	
Win	24–2	Ádám Borics	Decision (unanimous)	PFL Madrid: van Steenis vs. Edwards 2	March 20, 2026	3	5:00	Madrid, Spain	
Win	23–2	Akhmed Magomedov	Decision (unanimous)	PFL Champions Series 2	July 19, 2025	3	5:00	Cape Town, South Africa	Return to Featherweight.
Loss	22–2	Paul Hughes	Decision (split)	PFL Super Fights: Battle of the Giants	October 19, 2024	3	5:00	Riyadh, Saudi Arabia	
Win	22–1	Clay Collard	Submission (armbar)	PFL vs. Bellator	February 24, 2024	1	1:10	Riyadh, Saudi Arabia	
Win	21–1	Sidney Outlaw	Decision (unanimous)	Bellator 301	November 17, 2023	3	5:00	Chicago, Illinois, United States	
Win	20–1	Roberto de Souza	Decision (unanimous)	Bellator MMA vs. Rizin	December 31, 2022	3	5:00	Saitama, Japan	
Win	19–1	Spike Carlyle	Decision (unanimous)	Bellator 286	October 1, 2022	3	5:00	Long Beach, California, United States	Lightweight debut; Carlyle missed weight (156.6 lb).
Loss	18–1	Patrício Pitbull	Decision (unanimous)	Bellator 277	April 15, 2022	5	5:00	San Jose, California, United States	Lost the Bellator Featherweight World Championship.
Win	18–0	Patrício Pitbull	Technical Submission (guillotine choke)	Bellator 263	July 31, 2021	1	1:57	Inglewood, California, United States	Won the Bellator Featherweight World Grand Prix and the Bellator Featherweight World Championship.
Win	17–0	Darrion Caldwell	Submission (neck crank)	Bellator 253	November 19, 2020	1	1:11	Uncasville, Connecticut, United States	Bellator Featherweight World Grand Prix Semifinal.
Win	16–0	Derek Campos	Submission (armbar)	Bellator 236	December 21, 2019	3	1:08	Honolulu, Hawaii, United States	Bellator Featherweight World Grand Prix Quarterfinal.
Win	15–0	Georgi Karakhanyan	KO (punches)	Bellator 228	September 28, 2019	1	0:08	Inglewood, California, United States	Bellator Featherweight World Grand Prix Opening Round.
Win	14–0	Pat Curran	Decision (unanimous)	Bellator 221	May 11, 2019	3	5:00	Rosemont, Illinois, United States	
Win	13–0	Daniel Crawford	Submission (anaconda choke)	Bellator 212	December 14, 2018	1	3:19	Honolulu, Hawaii, United States	
Win	12–0	John Macapá	KO (punch)	Bellator 205	September 21, 2018	1	1:09	Boise, Idaho, United States	
Win	11–0	Justin Lawrence	Decision (unanimous)	Bellator 197	April 13, 2018	3	5:00	St. Charles, Missouri, United States	
Win	10–0	Brian Moore	Technical Submission (rear-naked choke)	Bellator 187	November 10, 2017	3	0:42	Dublin, Ireland	
Win	9–0	Blair Tugman	Decision (unanimous)	Bellator 182	August 25, 2017	3	5:00	Verona, New York, United States	
Win	8–0	Dominic Mazzotta	KO (head kick)	Bellator 178	April 21, 2017	1	1:15	Uncasville, Connecticut, United States	
Win	7–0	Brandon Phillips	Decision (unanimous)	Bellator 171	January 27, 2017	3	5:00	Mulvane, Kansas, United States	
Win	6–0	Ray Wood	Decision (unanimous)	Bellator 166	December 2, 2016	3	5:00	Thackerville, Oklahoma, United States	
Win	5–0	Cody Walker	Submission (guillotine choke)	Bellator 160	August 26, 2016	2	0:32	Anaheim, California, United States	
Win	4–0	Danilo Belluardo	TKO (punches)	Bellator 152	April 16, 2016	1	2:44	Turin, Italy	
Win	3–0	J.T. Donaldson	KO (knee)	Bellator 147	December 4, 2015	1	3:19	San Jose, California, United States	
Win	2–0	James Barnes	KO (punch)	Bellator 141	August 28, 2015	1	1:42	Temecula, California, United States	
Win	1–0	Marcos Bonilla	Submission (rear-naked choke)	Bellator 136	April 10, 2015	1	2:08	Irvine, California, United States	Featherweight debut.

== See also ==
- List of current PFL fighters
