= Bellator 276 =

Bellator mixed martial arts event in 2022

Bellator 276: Borics vs. Burnell
- The poster for Bellator 276: Borics vs. Burnell
- Promotion: Bellator MMA
- Date: March 12, 2022
- Venue: Family Arena
- City: St. Louis, Missouri, United States

Event chronology
Bellator 275: Mousasi vs. Vanderford	Bellator 276: Borics vs. Burnell	Bellator 277: McKee vs. Pitbull 2

Bellator 276: Borics vs. Burnell was a mixed martial arts event produced by Bellator MMA that took place on March 12, 2022, at the Family Arena in St. Louis, Missouri, United States.

== Background ==
The event marked the promotion's fourth visit to St. Louis and first since Bellator 157 in June 2016.

The main event featured a Featherweight title eliminator between Ádám Borics and Mads Burnell.

In the co-main event, former Bellator Light Heavyweight Champion and No. 2-ranked Phil Davis returned to action against No. 4-ranked Julius Anglickas, who most recently challenged for the 205-pound title.

One-time Bellator middleweight title challenger John Salter faced Johnny Eblen in a middleweight bout.

A women's featherweight between Cat Zingano and Pam Sorenson was scheduled for the event. However, Zingano was forced to pull out due to injury and the bout was cancelled.

A middleweight bout between Romero Cotton and Lance Wright was scheduled for this event. However, Wright pulled out of the bout due to injury and was replaced by Freddy Sandoval.

A welterweight bout between Derek Anderson and Goiti Yamauchi was scheduled for this event. The week of the event, the bout was scrapped for unknown reasons.

A women's flyweight bout between Diana Avsaragova and Ashley Deen was scheduled for this event. The week of the event, Deen pulled out of the bout and was replaced by Kyra Batara.

At the weigh-ins, Josh Weston missed weight for his bout, weighing in at 175.8 pounds, 4.8 pounds over the welterweight non-title fight limit. Due to the weigh miss, his bout against Josh Augustine was cancelled.

== Results ==
Main Card (Showtime)
Weight class				Method	Round	Time	Notes
Featherweight	Ádám Borics	def.	Mads Burnell	Decision (unanimous) (49–46, 50–45, 49–46)	5	5:00
Light Heavyweight	Phil Davis	def.	Julius Anglickas	Decision (unanimous) (30–27, 30–27, 30–27)	3	5:00
Middleweight	Johnny Eblen	def.	John Salter	Decision (unanimous) (30–27, 30–27, 30–27)	3	5:00
Lightweight	Gadzhi Rabadanov	def.	Jay-Jay Wilson	Decision (unanimous) (30–27, 29–28, 29–28)	3	5:00
Preliminary card (Youtube/Pluto TV)
Light Heavyweight	Alex Polizzi	def.	José Augusto Azevedo	Submission (rear-naked choke)	3	0:49
Middleweight	Romero Cotton	def.	Freddy Sandoval	TKO (punches)	1	1:39
Women's Flyweight	Diana Avsaragova	def.	Kyra Batara	Decision (unanimous) (30–27, 30–27, 30–27)	3	5:00
Featherweight	Cody Law	def.	James Adcock	KO (punches)	1	1:17
Welterweight	Roman Faraldo	def.	Kelvin Rayford	TKO (punches)	1	0:44
Bantamweight	Jordan Howard	def.	Trevor Ward	TKO (elbows)	2	3:24
Amateur bout
Middleweight	Nico Alcaraz	def.	Stanton Ketcherside	Submission (keylock)	2	2:00

== See also ==
- 2022 in Bellator MMA
- List of Bellator MMA events
- List of current Bellator fighters
