= Bellator 277 =

Bellator mixed martial arts event in 2022

Bellator 277: McKee vs. Pitbull 2
- The poster for Bellator 277: McKee vs. Pitbull 2
- Promotion: Bellator MMA
- Date: April 15, 2022
- Venue: SAP Center
- City: San Jose, California, United States

Event chronology
Bellator 276: Borics vs. Burnell	Bellator 277: McKee vs. Pitbull 2	Bellator 278: Velasquez vs. Carmouche

Bellator 277: McKee vs. Pitbull 2 was a mixed martial arts event produced by Bellator MMA that took place on April 15, 2022, at the SAP Center in San Jose, California, United States.

== Background ==
The event marked the promotion's 12th visit to San Jose and first since Bellator 266 in September 2021.

The event was headlined by a Bellator Featherweight World Championship rematch between current champion A. J. McKee and former two-time champion (also former Bellator Lightweight World Champion) Patrício Pitbull. The duo previously fought in the Bellator 263 main event, where McKee took Pitbull's title in the Bellator Featherweight World Grand Prix final via a first-round guillotine choke submission.

The co-main event featured the final of the Bellator Light Heavyweight World Grand Prix Tournament, as a Bellator Light Heavyweight World Championship bout between current champion Vadim Nemkov and The Ultimate Fighter: Team Edgar vs. Team Penn light heavyweight winner Corey Anderson as well as the $1 million prize.

A heavyweight bout between former interim Bellator Heavyweight World Championship challenger Timothy Johnson and Tyrell Fortune was scheduled for the event. However, on March 1, 2022, it was announced by Bellator that Johnson was expected to face Linton Vassell and Fortune was set to meet Steve Mowry in the event. In turn, Mowry pulled out of the bout in late March and was replaced by Rakim Cleveland.

A middleweight bout between Pat Downey and Daniel Compton was scheduled for this event. However, after developing Red skin syndrome, Downey was forced to pull out of the bout.

A light heavyweight bout between Dovletdzhan Yagshimuradov and Tony Johnson was scheduled for the event. However, due to an injury, Johnson was forced to pull out and was replaced by former Bellator Middleweight Champion Rafael Carvalho.

A featherweight bout between Aaron Pico and Jeremy Kennedy was expected to take place at the event. However, Kennedy withdrew 8 days before the event and Adli Edwards replaced him.

== Results ==
Main Card (Showtime)
Weight class				Method	Round	Time	Notes
Featherweight	Patrício Pitbull	def.	A. J. McKee (c)	Decision (unanimous) (49–46, 48–47, 48–47)	5	5:00	(Note: For the Bellator Featherweight World Championship.)
Light Heavyweight	Vadim Nemkov (c)	vs.	Corey Anderson	No Contest (accidental clash of heads)	3	4:55	(Note: Bellator Light Heavyweight World Grand Prix Tournament Final bout for the Bellator Light Heavyweight World Championship and $1 million dollar prize. Accidental clash of heads opened a cut above Nemkov's eye which rendered him unable to continue.)
Catchweight (150 lb)	Aaron Pico	def.	Adli Edwards	TKO (punches)	3	0:55
Heavyweight	Linton Vassell	def.	Timothy Johnson	TKO (punches)	1	4:21
Preliminary card (Youtube/Pluto TV)
Welterweight	Tyson Miller	def.	Rhalan Gracie	TKO (doctor stoppage)	1	5:00
Heavyweight	Tyrell Fortune	def.	Rakim Cleveland	TKO (punches and knee)	1	1:38
Light Heavyweight	Dovletdzhan Yagshimuradov	def.	Rafael Carvalho	TKO (elbows and punches)	2	4:04
Bantamweight	Bobby Seronio III	def.	Calob Ramirez	KO (punch)	2	2:14
Featherweight	Gaston Bolanos	def.	Daniel Carey	TKO (punches)	1	4:59
Welterweight	Kyle Crutchmer	def.	Michael Lombardo	Decision (unanimous) (29-28, 30-27, 30-27)	3	5:00
Flyweight	Edwin De Los Santos	def.	Alberto Mendez	Decision (unanimous) (30-27, 30-27, 30-27)	3	5:00
Featherweight	Rogelio Luna	def.	Socrates Hernandez	TKO (punches)	3	4:48
Featherweight	Laird Anderson	def.	JT Donaldson	Submission (rear-naked choke)	1	2:44
Light Heavyweight	Theo Haig	def.	Alan Benson	Submission (rear-naked choke)	1	2:08

== Aftermath ==
After the Light Heavyweight Grand Prix Final ended in a no contest and no winner was declared, Bellator frontman Scott Coker announced that the final between Nemkov and Anderson will be rebooked later in 2022.

== Reported payout ==
The following is the reported payout to the fighters as reported to the California State Athletic Commission. The amounts do not include sponsor money, discretionary bonuses, viewership points or additional earnings.

- Patrício Freire: $250,000 def. A.J. McKee: $250,000
- Vadim Nemkov: $80,000 vs. Corey Anderson: $250,000
- Aaron Pico: $75,000 def. Adli Edwards: $50,000
- Linton Vassell: $138,000 (includes $69,000 win bonus) def. Timothy Johnson: $75,000
- Tyrell Fortune: $75,000 def. Rakim Cleveland: $30,000
- Tyson Miller: $4,000 (includes $2,000 win bonus) def. Rhalen Gracie: $5,000
- Dovletdzhan Yagshimuradov: $70,000 (includes $35,000 win bonus) def. Rafael Carvalho: $30,000
- Gaston Bolanos: $50,000 (includes $25,000 win bonus) def. Daniel Carey: $12,000
- Bobby Seronio III: $4,000 (includes $2,000 win bonus) def. Calob Ramirez: $2,000
- Kyle Crutchmer: $50,000 (includes $25,000 win bonus) def. Michael Lombardo: $20,000
- Edwin De Los Santos: $4,000 (includes $2,000 win bonus) def. Alberto Mendez: $2,000
- Rogelio Luna: $4,000 (includes $2,000 win bonus) def. Socrates Hernandez: $2,000
- Laird Anderson: $4,000 (includes $2,000 win bonus) def. JT Donaldson: $2,000
- Theo Haig: $4,000 (includes $2,000 win bonus) def. Alan Benson: $2,000

== See also ==
- 2022 in Bellator MMA
- List of Bellator MMA events
- List of current Bellator fighters
