= 2021 in Bellator MMA =

Mixed martial arts events

Information
- Promotion: Bellator MMA
- First date aired: April 2, 2021
- Last date aired: December 3, 2021

Events
- Total events: 18

Fights
- Title fights: 13

2021 in Bellator MMA was the thirteenth year in the history of Bellator MMA, a mixed martial arts promotion based in the United States. Bellator held 18 events in 2021.

== Background ==
The promotion went on a hiatus following Bellator 254 on December 10, 2020, which would be the final card to air on CBS Sports Network. Beginning in April, Bellator's U.S broadcasts moved to the premium Showtime network. Bellator 255, which took place on April 2, 2021, was the promotion's debut on Showtime, and the first MMA card to air on the network in over eight years; the last event being Strikeforce: Marquardt vs. Saffiedine on January 12, 2013.

== Events list ==
=== Past events ===
#	Event	Date	Venue	City	Country	Atten.	Ref.
18	Bellator 272: Pettis vs. Horiguchi	December 3, 2021	Mohegan Sun Arena	Uncasville, Connecticut	U.S.		
17	Bellator 271: Cyborg vs. Kavanagh	November 12, 2021	Seminole Hard Rock Hotel & Casino Hollywood	Hollywood, Florida	U.S.		
16	Bellator 270: Queally vs. Pitbull 2	November 5, 2021	3Arena	Dublin	Ireland		
15	Bellator 269: Fedor vs. Johnson	October 23, 2021	VTB Arena	Moscow	Russia		
14	Bellator 268: Nemkov vs. Anglickas	October 16, 2021	Footprint Center	Phoenix, Arizona	U.S.		
13	Bellator 267: Lima vs. MVP 2	October 1, 2021	Wembley Arena	London	England		
12	Bellator 266: Davis vs. Romero	September 18, 2021	SAP Center	San Jose, California	U.S.		
11	Bellator 265: Kongo vs. Kharitonov	August 20, 2021	Sanford Pentagon	Sioux Falls, South Dakota	U.S.		
10	Bellator 264: Mousasi vs. Salter	August 13, 2021	Mohegan Sun Arena	Uncasville, Connecticut	U.S.		
9	Bellator 263: Pitbull vs. McKee	July 31, 2021	The Forum	Inglewood, California	U.S.		
8	Bellator 262: Velasquez vs. Kielholtz	July 16, 2021	Mohegan Sun Arena	Uncasville, Connecticut	U.S.		
7	Bellator 261: Johnson vs. Moldavsky	June 25, 2021	Mohegan Sun Arena	Uncasville, Connecticut	U.S.		
6	Bellator 260: Lima vs. Amosov	June 11, 2021	Mohegan Sun Arena	Uncasville, Connecticut	U.S.		
5	Bellator 259: Cyborg vs. Smith 2	May 21, 2021	Mohegan Sun Arena	Uncasville, Connecticut	U.S.	0	
4	Bellator 258: Archuleta vs. Pettis	May 7, 2021	Mohegan Sun Arena	Uncasville, Connecticut	U.S.	0	
3	Bellator 257: Nemkov vs. Davis 2	Apr 16, 2021	Mohegan Sun Arena	Uncasville, Connecticut	U.S.	0	
2	Bellator 256: Bader vs. Machida 2	Apr 9, 2021	Mohegan Sun Arena	Uncasville, Connecticut	U.S.	0	
1	Bellator 255: Pitbull vs. Sanchez 2	Apr 2, 2021	Mohegan Sun Arena	Uncasville, Connecticut	U.S.	0	

== Bellator Featherweight World Grand Prix Tournament ==
Opening round
(United States) A. J. McKee	KO
(Armenia) Georgi Karakhanyan	1
(United States) Derek Campos	UD
(United States) Daniel Straus	3
(United States) Darrion Caldwell	UD
(United States) Henry Corrales	3
(Hungary) Ádám Borics	TKO
(United States) Pat Curran	2
(Brazil) Patrício Pitbull (c)	UD
(United States) Juan Archuleta	5
(Portugal) Pedro Carvalho	SUB
(United States) Sam Sicilia	2
(United States) Emmanuel Sanchez	SUB
(United States) Tywan Claxton	2
(Germany) Daniel Weichel	UD
(United Kingdom) Saul Rogers	3

Quarterfinals
(United States) A. J. McKee	SUB
(United States) Derek Campos	3
(United States) Darrion Caldwell	SUB
(Hungary) Ádám Borics	1
(Brazil) Patrício Pitbull (c)	KO
(Portugal) Pedro Carvalho	1
(United States) Emmanuel Sanchez	UD
(Germany) Daniel Weichel	5

Semi-finals
(United States) A. J. McKee	SUB
(United States) Darrion Caldwell	1
(Brazil) Patrício Pitbull (c)	SUB
(United States) Emmanuel Sanchez	1

Final
(United States) A. J. McKee	SUB
(Brazil) Patrício Pitbull (c)	1

== Bellator Light Heavyweight World Grand Prix Tournament ==
Quarter-finals
(Russia) Vadim Nemkov (c)	UD
(United States) Phil Davis	5
(United States) Anthony Johnson	KO
(Brazil) Jose Augusto	2
(United States) Corey Anderson	TKO
(Turkmenistan) Dovletdzhan Yagshimuradov	3
(United States) Ryan Bader	UD
(Brazil) Lyoto Machida	5

Semi-finals
(Russia) Vadim Nemkov (c)	SUB
(Lithuania) Julius Anglickas (Note: Julius Anglickas replaced an injured Anthony Johnson.)	4
(United States) Corey Anderson	TKO
(United States) Ryan Bader	1

Final
(Russia) Vadim Nemkov (c)	UD
(United States) Corey Anderson	5 (Note: Original final match was held at Bellator 277 and ended in a No Contest; A rematch final took place November 18, 2022 at Bellator 288.)

== Title fights ==
Title fights in 2021
Weight class				Method	Round	Time	Event	Notes
Featherweight	Patrício Pitbull (c)	def.	Emmanuel Sanchez	Technical Submission (guillotine choke)	1	3:35	Bellator 255	(Note: For the Bellator Featherweight World Championship)
Light Heavyweight	Vadim Nemkov (c)	def.	Phil Davis	Decision (unanimous) (48–47, 48–47, 48–47)	5	5:00	Bellator 257	(Note: For the Bellator Light Heavyweight World Championship)
Bantamweight	Sergio Pettis	def.	Juan Archuleta (c)	Decision (unanimous) (50–45, 49–46, 49–46)	5	5:00	Bellator 258	(Note: For the Bellator Bantamweight World Championship)
Women's Featherweight	Cris Cyborg (c)	def.	Leslie Smith	TKO (punches)	5	4:51	Bellator 259	(Note: For the Bellator Women's Featherweight World Championship.)
Welterweight	Yaroslav Amosov	def.	Douglas Lima (c)	Decision (unanimous) (50-45, 49-46, 49-46)	5	5:00	Bellator 260	(Note: For the Bellator Welterweight World Championship.)
Heavyweight	Valentin Moldavsky	def.	Timothy Johnson	Decision (unanimous) (50-45, 49-46, 49-46)	5	5:00	Bellator 261	(Note: For the interim Bellator Heavyweight World Championship.)
Women's Flyweight	Juliana Velasquez (c)	def.	Denise Kielholtz	Decision (split) (48-47, 47-48, 48-47)	5	5:00	Bellator 262	(Note: For the Bellator Women's Flyweight World Championship.)
Featherweight	A. J. McKee	def.	Patrício Pitbull (c)	Technical Submission (guillotine choke)	1	1:57	Bellator 263	(Note: For the Bellator Featherweight World Championship)
Middleweight	Gegard Mousasi (c)	def.	John Salter	TKO (punches)	3	2:07	Bellator 264	(Note: For the Bellator Middleweight World Championship.)
Light Heavyweight	Vadim Nemkov (c)	def.	Julius Anglickas	Submission (kimura)	4	4:25	Bellator 268	(Note: For the Bellator Light Heavyweight World Championship)
Lightweight	Patricky Pitbull	def.	Peter Queally	TKO (punches)	2	1:05	Bellator 270	(Note: For the vacant Bellator Lightweight World Championship.)
Women's Featherweight	Cris Cyborg (c)	def.	Sinead Kavanagh	KO (punches)	1	1:32	Bellator 271	(Note: For the Bellator Women's Featherweight World Championship.)
Bantamweight	Sergio Pettis (c)	def.	Kyoji Horiguchi	KO (spinning backfist)	4	3:24	Bellator 272	(Note: For the Bellator Bantamweight World Championship.)

== See also ==
- List of Bellator events
- List of current Bellator fighters
