= Vadim Nemkov =

Russian sambist and mixed martial artist

- Born: Vadim Nemkov; June 20, 1992 (age 34); Belgorod, Russia
- Native name: Вадим Немков
- Height: 6 ft 0 in (1.83 m)
- Weight: 241.9 lb (109.7 kg; 17.28 st)
- Division: Heavyweight (2015, 2016, 2024–present); Light Heavyweight (2013–2015, 2016–2023)
- Reach: 76 in (193 cm)
- Style: Combat sambo
- Fighting out of: Stary Oskol, Russia
- Team: FedorTeam; Alexander Nevsky (Stary Oskol); American Top Team
- Trainer: Fedor Emelianenko
- Rank: International Master of Sport in Combat Sambo
- Years active: 2013–present

Mixed martial arts record
- Total: 24
- Wins: 20
- By knockout: 10
- By submission: 6
- By decision: 4
- Losses: 3
- By knockout: 1
- By decision: 2
- No contests: 1

Other information
- Notable relatives: Viktor Nemkov (brother)
- Mixed martial arts record from Sherdog
- Last updated on: 17 October 2021

Vadim Aleksandrovich Nemkov (Russian: Вадим Александрович Немков; born 20 June 1992) is a Russian professional mixed martial artist and a sambo competitor. He currently competes in the Heavyweight division of the PFL, where he was the inaugural Heavyweight Champion. He formerly competed in the Light Heavyweight division of Bellator MMA, where he was the longest-reigning Light Heavyweight World Champion. As of March 26, he is #3 in the PFL men's pound-for-pound rankings. Nemkov is the younger brother of Viktor Nemkov and a protégé of the heavyweight MMA and sambo master Fedor Emelianenko.

== Background ==
Vadim Aleksandrovich Nemkov was born in Zhezqazghan, Kazakhstan on June 20, 1992. He grew up in the village of Tomarovka in Russia's Belgorod Oblast. According to Nemkov, his father moved the family to Tomarovka after visiting the area and finding work near the city of Belgorod.

Nemkov began training in martial arts at a young age, often following his older brother Viktor, who was a mixed martial artist and judoka. Upon entering the 9th grade, Nemkov began attending a camp in Stary Oskol, where Russian MMA star Fedor Emelianenko and his team were training. Following graduation from high school, Nemkov served in the Russian Spetsnaz GRU before joining Fedor Team full-time.

== Mixed martial arts career ==
=== Early career ===
As part of mixed martial arts, Nemkov made his debut on May 31, 2013. The technical knockout that knocked out Magomed Datsiev brought victory to Vadim. Less than a month later, on June 27, he also defeated Andrei Trufaikin by TKO. The next were the Pole Michal Gutovskiy (10–3 at the time of the fight) and the Romanian Isidor Bunea, who generally appeared in professional MMA for the first and last time - they lost in the first round. As a result, having gained a series of 4 early victories, already in 2015, Vadim was signed to Rizin.

=== Rizin Fighting Federation ===
==== Rizin Fighting World Grand Prix 2015 ====
In November 2015, the Japanese fight promotion – and successor to Pride Fighting Championships – Rizin Fighting Federation announced the brackets for a Heavyweight Grand Prix to be held on December 29 and 31. It was announced Nemkov would make his Rizin debut against Goran Reljic. He won the bout by knockout in the first round, advancing to the semi-finals 2 days later. In the semi-finals on December 31, Nemkov faced Jiří Procházka, losing via retirement due to being too exhausted at the end of the first (10 minute) round.

==== Rizin 1 ====
Nemkov returned to face Karl Albrektsson on April 16, 2016, at Rizin 1. He lost the fight via split decision.

==== Rizin Fighting Word Grand Prix 2016: Second Round ====
After a fight in Russia for Fight Nights Global, Nemkov again competed in Rizin against Alison Vicente on December 29, 2016, at RIZIN FF WGP 2nd round. He won the fight via TKO in the first round.

=== Fight Nights Global ===
==== Fight Nights Global 50: Emelianenko vs Maldonado ====
On June 17, 2016, Nemkov fought Mikołaj Różanski on the Fight Nights Global 50: Emelianenko vs Maldonado card in St. Petersburg, Russia. He won the fight via TKO in the first round.

=== Bellator MMA ===
On August 25, 2017, Nemkov made his Bellator debut against Philipe Lins at Bellator 182. He won the fight by knockout in the first round.

In his second bout for the promotion, Nemkov faced former Bellator Light Heavyweight champion Liam McGeary at Bellator 194 on February 16, 2017. He won the fight via TKO due to leg kicks in the third round.

Nemkov faced another former Bellator Light Heavyweight champion in Phil Davis on November 15, 2018, at Bellator 209. He won the closely contested bout via split decision.

In the beginning of 2019, Nemkov signed a new, multi-fight contract with Bellator MMA. As the first fight of the contract, Nemkov faced former Bellator middleweight champion Rafael Carvalho at Bellator 230 on October 12, 2019. Nemkov won the bout via submission in the second round.

==== Bellator Light Heavyweight World Champion ====
After racking up four straight wins in Bellator, three of which against former Bellator titleholders, Nemkov was signed to challenge Ryan Bader at Bellator 242 on May 9, 2020, for the Bellator Light Heavyweight World Championship. However, it was later announced that Bellator 242 and Nemkov's bout against Bader was being postponed due to the COVID-19 pandemic. The bout with Bader was rescheduled and took place on August 21 at Bellator 244. Nemkov won the bout via second-round technical knockout to capture the Bellator Light Heavyweight title.

On February 9, 2021, it was announced that Nemkov would be defending the Bellator Light Heavyweight title in the Bellator Light Heavyweight World Grand Prix Tournament. It was announced that Nemkov would make his first title defense against Phil Davis, a rematch of their November 2018 bout, which saw Nemkov win via split decision. The bout took place at Bellator 257 on April 16, 2021. Nemkov won the bout via unanimous decision, with Nemkov controlling the first three rounds on the feet.

In the semi-finals of the Grand Prix, Nemkov was scheduled to face Anthony Johnson on October 16, 2021, at Bellator 268. On September 18, it was announced that Johnson was pulled from the Grand Prix due to an undisclosed illness and he was replaced by Julius Anglickas. Nemkov dominated the fight with wrestling and ground and pound, eventually winning via submission in round four.

In the finals of the Bellator Light Heavyweight World Grand Prix Tournament, Nemkov took on Corey Anderson for the 205-pound title as well as the $1 million prize on April 15, 2022, at Bellator 277. The fight ended in a no contest after an accidental clash of heads resulted in a cut on Nemkov's left brow that rendered him unable to continue.

The rematch of the finals took place on November 18, 2022, at Bellator 288. Nemkov was able to stop all the takedowns of Anderson, going 16 for 16, and picked Anderson apart from distance on the way to defending his belt and winning the $1 million prize for winning the Grand Prix via unanimous decision.

Nemkov was scheduled to defend his title against Yoel Romero on February 4, 2023, at Bellator 290. However, Nemkov was forced to withdraw due to undisclosed reason and the bout was scrapped.

In January 2023, Bellator announced that it had signed a multi-year, multi-fight contract with Nemkov.

The fight with Yoel Romero was rebooked and eventually took place on June 16, 2023, at Bellator 297. Nemkov won the fight via unanimous decision.

==== Move to Heavyweight ====
On January 17, 2024, Nemkov announced that he was vacating the Bellator Light Heavyweight World Championship and moving up to Heavyweight.

Nemkov faced 2021 PFL Heavyweight champion Bruno Cappelozza on February 24, 2024, at PFL vs. Bellator. He won by arm-triangle submission in the second round.

After Ante Delija withdrew for unknown reasons, Nemkov was scheduled to face Bellator Light Heavyweight World Champion Corey Anderson in a heavyweight bout for their third meeting on January 25, 2025, at Bellator Champions Series 6 (also marketed as PFL Road to Dubai: Champions Series). However, on December 15, Anderson stated that the fight was off because he is "too tough of a fight" for Nemkov., and Nemkov instead faced Timothy Johnson. He won the fight via a rear-naked choke submission in the first round.

=== Professional Fighters League ===
==== PFL Heavyweight Champion ====
Nemkov faced 2023 PFL Heavyweight Tournament winner Renan Ferreira for the inaugural PFL Heavyweight Championship on December 13, 2025, at PFL Europe 4. Nemkov won the bout via submission in the first round.

In his first title defense, Nemkov faced Sergey Bilostenniy on November 14, 2026, at PFL Returns to Dubai. He lost the title via unanimous decision.

== Personal life ==
Nemkov served in the 16th Spetsnaz Brigade in 2010.

== Championships and accomplishments ==
- Professional Fighters League
  - PFL Heavyweight Championship (One time)
- Bellator MMA
  - Bellator Light Heavyweight World Championship (One time)
    - Four successful title defenses
  - Most consecutive Light Heavyweight title defenses in Bellator MMA history (four)
  - 2021 Bellator Light Heavyweight World Grand Prix winner
  - PFL vs. Bellator Champion of Champions Super Belt (One time)
- Rizin Fighting Federation
  - 2015 Rizin World Grand Prix Semifinalist
- MMA Sucka
  - 2020 Non-UFC Breakout Star of the Year
- MMA Fighting
  - 2025 Third Team MMA All-Star

== Mixed martial arts record ==
Professional record breakdown
24 matches	20 wins	3 losses
By knockout	10	1
By submission	6	0
By decision	4	2
No contests	1	

Res.	Record	Opponent	Method	Event	Date	Round	Time	Location	Notes
Loss	20–3 (1)	Sergey Bilostenniy	Decision (unanimous)	PFL Dubai: Nemkov vs. Bilostenniy	November 14, 2026	5	5:00	Dubai, United Arab Emirates	Lost the PFL Heavyweight Championship.
Win	20–2 (1)	Renan Ferreira	Submission (arm-triangle choke)	PFL Lyon: Nemkov vs. Ferreira	December 13, 2025	1	4:00	Décines-Charpieu, France	Won the inaugural PFL Heavyweight Championship.
Win	19–2 (1)	Timothy Johnson	Submission (rear-naked choke)	PFL Champions Series 1	January 25, 2025	1	3:08	Dubai, United Arab Emirates	
Win	18–2 (1)	Bruno Cappelozza	Technical Submission (arm-triangle choke)	PFL vs. Bellator	February 24, 2024	2	2:13	Riyadh, Saudi Arabia	Return to Heavyweight.
Win	17–2 (1)	Yoel Romero	Decision (unanimous)	Bellator 297	June 16, 2023	5	5:00	Chicago, Illinois, United States	Defended the Bellator Light Heavyweight World Championship. Later vacated the title on Jan 17, 2024.
Win	16–2 (1)	Corey Anderson	Decision (unanimous)	Bellator 288	November 18, 2022	5	5:00	Chicago, Illinois, United States	Won the Bellator Light Heavyweight World Grand Prix. Defended the Bellator Light Heavyweight World Championship.
NC	15–2 (1)	Corey Anderson	NC (accidental clash of heads)	Bellator 277	April 15, 2022	3	4:55	San Jose, California, United States	Bellator Light Heavyweight World Grand Prix Final. Retained the Bellator Light Heavyweight World Championship. Accidental clash of heads rendered Nemkov unable to continue.
Win	15–2	Julius Anglickas	Submission (kimura)	Bellator 268	October 16, 2021	4	4:25	Phoenix, Arizona, United States	Bellator Light Heavyweight World Grand Prix Semifinal. Defended the Bellator Light Heavyweight World Championship.
Win	14–2	Phil Davis	Decision (unanimous)	Bellator 257	April 16, 2021	5	5:00	Uncasville, Connecticut, United States	Bellator Light Heavyweight World Grand Prix Quarterfinal. Defended the Bellator Light Heavyweight World Championship.
Win	13–2	Ryan Bader	TKO (head kick and punches)	Bellator 244	August 21, 2020	2	3:02	Uncasville, Connecticut, United States	Won the Bellator Light Heavyweight World Championship.
Win	12–2	Rafael Carvalho	Submission (rear-naked choke)	Bellator 230	October 12, 2019	2	3:56	Milan, Italy	
Win	11–2	Phil Davis	Decision (split)	Bellator 209	November 15, 2018	3	5:00	Tel Aviv, Israel	
Win	10–2	Liam McGeary	TKO (leg kicks)	Bellator 194	February 16, 2018	3	4:02	Uncasville, Connecticut, United States	
Win	9–2	Philipe Lins	KO (punches)	Bellator 182	August 25, 2017	1	3:03	Verona, New York, United States	
Win	8–2	Alison Vicente	KO (punches)	Rizin World Grand Prix 2016: 2nd Round	December 29, 2016	1	0:55	Saitama, Japan	
Win	7–2	Mikołaj Różanski	TKO (punches)	Fight Nights Global 50	June 17, 2016	1	3:39	Saint Petersburg, Russia	
Loss	6–2	Karl Albrektsson	Decision (split)	Rizin 1	April 17, 2016	3	5:00	Nagoya, Japan	Return to Light Heavyweight.
Loss	6–1	Jiří Procházka	TKO (retirement)	Rizin World Grand Prix 2015: Part 2 - Iza	December 31, 2015	1	10:00	Saitama, Japan	2015 Rizin Heavyweight Grand Prix Semifinal.
Win	6–0	Goran Reljić	KO (punches)	Rizin World Grand Prix 2015: Part 1 - Saraba	December 29, 2015	1	2:58	Saitama, Japan	Heavyweight debut. 2015 Rizin Heavyweight Grand Prix Quarterfinal.
Win	5–0	Joaquim Ferreira	KO (punch)	League S-70: Plotforma Cup 2015	August 29, 2015	1	0:22	Sochi, Russia	
Win	4–0	Isidor Bunea	Submission (rear-naked choke)	Stary Oskol MMA Federation: Steel Battle 2	April 24, 2015	1	1:00	Stary Oskol, Russia	
Win	3–0	Michał Gutowski	TKO (punches)	Youth Sports Foundation KHARS: Liberation 2013	August 5, 2013	1	4:32	Belgorod, Russia	
Win	2–0	Andrei Trufaikin	TKO (punches)	Radmer Cup 4: 2 Round	June 27, 2013	1	2:29	Sterlitamak, Russia	
Win	1–0	Magomed Datsiev	TKO (punches)	Union of Mixed Martial Arts: Way of the Warrior 3	May 31, 2013	3	0:57	Tambov, Russia	Light Heavyweight debut.

== See also ==
- List of current PFL fighters
- List of male mixed martial artists
- List of multi-sport athletes
- List of multi-sport champions
