= PFL 8 (2024) =

Professional Fighters League MMA event in 2024

- The poster for PFL 8
- Promotion: Professional Fighters League
- Date: August 16, 2024
- Venue: Seminole Hard Rock Hotel & Casino Hollywood
- City: Hollywood, Florida, United States

Event chronology
| PFL 7 | PFL 8 | PFL 9 |

The PFL 8 mixed martial arts event for the 2024 season of the Professional Fighters League was held on August 16, 2024, at Seminole Hard Rock Hotel & Casino Hollywood in Hollywood, Florida, United States. This marked the semi-final playoffs for the Lightweight and Light Heavyweight divisions.

== Background ==
The event marked the promotion's sixth visit to Hollywood and first since PFL 10 (2021) in October 2021.

The event featured the semifinal of 2024 PFL playoffs in a light heavyweight and lightweight divisions.

A light heavyweight alternate bout between 2021 PFL light heavyweight winner and The Ultimate Fighter: Brazil 3 heavyweight winner Antônio Carlos Júnior and Karl Albrektsson was scheduled for this event. However the week of the event, Albrektsson pulled out for unknown reasons. Carlos Júnior remained an alternate for the light heavyweight playoffs.

At weigh-ins, Brian Stapleton came in at 160.5 lbs, 4.5 pounds over the lightweight limit. He was fined a percentage of his purse which went to his opponent Biaggio Ali Walsh.

== Results ==
Main card (ESPN / ESPN+)
| Weight class | | | | Method | Round | Time | Notes |
|---|---|---|---|---|---|---|---|
| Light Heavyweight | Impa Kasanganay | def. | Josh Silveira | Decision (unanimous) (29–28, 29–28, 30–27) | 3 | 5:00 | (Note: 2024 PFL Light Heavyweight Tournament Semifinal.) |
| Light Heavyweight | Dovletdzhan Yagshimuradov | def. | Rob Wilkinson | Decision (unanimous) (30–27, 30–27, 30–27) | 3 | 5:00 | (Note: 2024 PFL Light Heavyweight Tournament Semifinal.) |
| Lightweight | Gadzhi Rabadanov | def. | Michael Dufort | KO (punches) | 2 | 1:51 | (Note: 2024 PFL Lightweight Tournament Semifinal.) |
| Lightweight | Brent Primus | def. | Clay Collard | Decision (unanimous) (30–27, 30–27, 30–26) | 3 | 5:00 | (Note: 2024 PFL Lightweight Tournament Semifinal.) |
| Lightweight | Biaggio Ali Walsh | def. | Brian Stapleton | TKO (punches) | 1 | 0:55 | (Note: Stapleton missed weight (160.5 lb).) |
Preliminary card (ESPN+)
| Bantamweight | Danny Sabatello | vs. | Lazaro Dayron | Draw (majority) (29–27, 28–28, 28–28) | 3 | 5:00 | (Note: Dayton was deducted one point in round 3 due to grabbing the fence.) |
| Lightweight | Mads Burnell | def. | Elvin Espinoza | Decision (unanimous) (29–28, 29–28, 29–28) | 3 | 5:00 | (Note: 2024 PFL Lightweight Tournament Alternate bout.) |
| Welterweight | Thad Jean | def. | Chris Brown | Decision (unanimous) (30–27, 29–28, 29–28) | 3 | 5:00 |
| Featherweight | Jordan Oliver | def. | Braydon Akeo | Decision (unanimous) (30–27, 29–28, 29–28) | 3 | 5:00 |
| Women's Featherweight | Michelle Montague | def. | Marilia Morais | Submission (rear-naked choke) | 1 | 1:44 |

== Playoff brackets ==
=== 2024 PFL Light Heavyweight playoffs ===
Semifinals
1 | (United States) Impa Kasanganay | UD
4 | (United States) Josh Silveira | 3
2 | (Australia) Rob Wilkinson | 3
3 | (Turkmenistan) Dovletdzhan Yagshimuradov | UD

Finals
1 | (United States) Impa Kasanganay
3 | (Turkmenistan) Dovletdzhan Yagshimuradov

=== 2024 PFL Lightweight playoffs ===
Semifinals
1 | (United States) Brent Primus | UD
4 | (United States) Clay Collard | 3
2 | (Russia) Gadzhi Rabadanov | KO
3 | (Canada) Michael Dufort | 2

Finals
1 | (United States) Brent Primus
2 | (Russia) Gadzhi Rabadanov

Legend
| (SD) | (Split Decision) |
| (UD) | (Unanimous Decision) |
| (MD) | (Majority Decision) |
| SUB | Submission |
| (T)KO | (Technical) Knock Out |
| L | Loss |

== See also ==
- List of PFL events
- List of current PFL fighters
