= Rafael Carvalho =

Brazilian mixed martial arts fighter

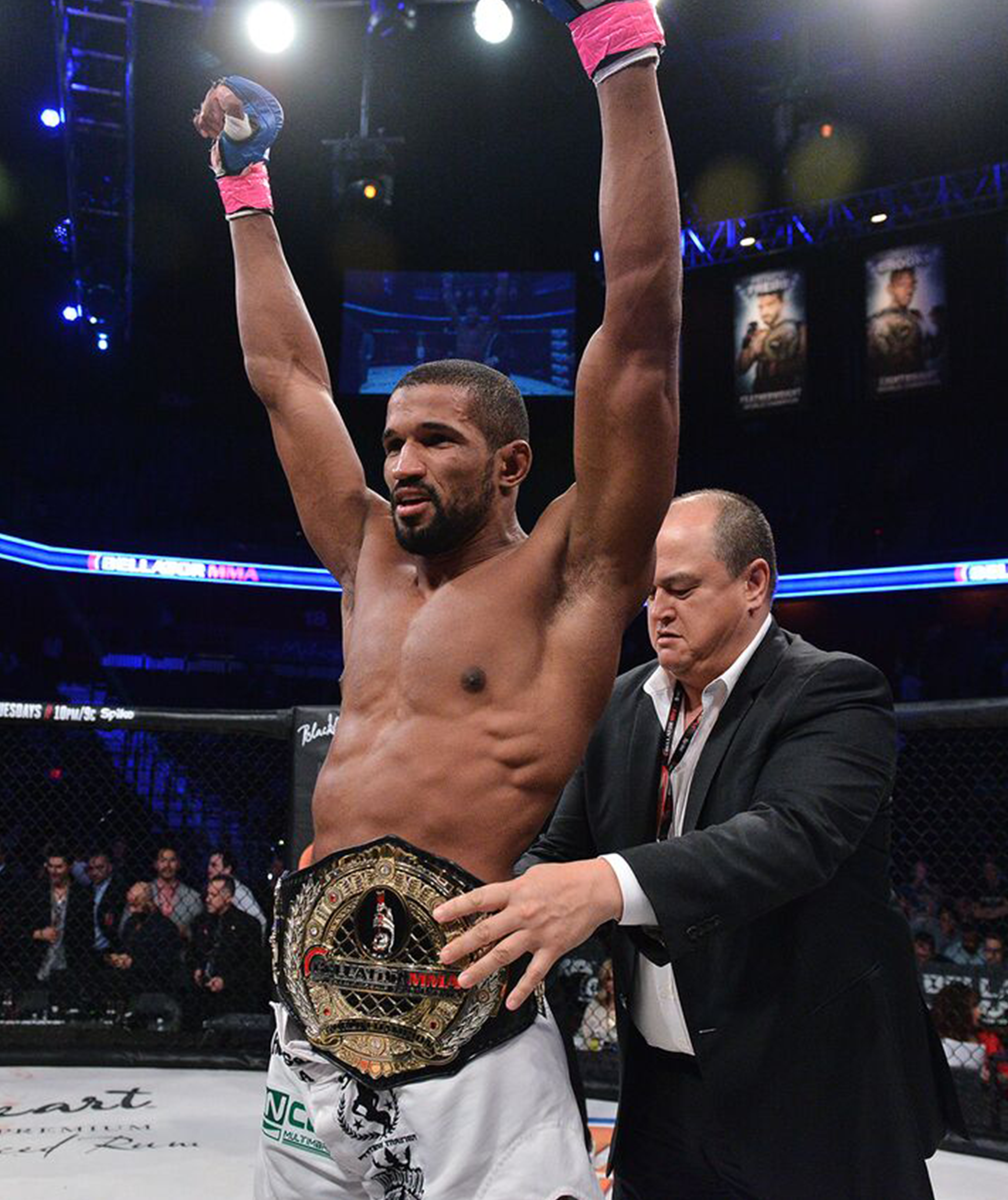
- Carvalho in 2015
- Born: Rafael Carvalho de Souza; 27 July 1986 (age 40); Rio de Janeiro, Brazil
- Other names: The Blessed
- Height: 6 ft 3 in (1.91 m)
- Weight: 185 lb (84 kg; 13.2 st)
- Division: Middleweight (2011–2019); Light Heavyweight (2019–present)
- Reach: 78 in (198 cm)
- Fighting out of: Campo Grande, Mato Grosso do Sul, Brazil
- Team: American Top Team (2019–present); Evolução Thai (formerly); Madison Team; Siam Team MMA College; Noguchi Team; LA Sports
- Rank: Brown belt in Brazilian jiu-jitsu
- Years active: 2011–present

Mixed martial arts record
- Total: 26
- Wins: 17
- By knockout: 12
- By decision: 5
- Losses: 9
- By knockout: 3
- By submission: 3
- By decision: 3

Other information
- Mixed martial arts record from Sherdog

Rafael Carvalho de Souza (born 27 July 1986) is a Brazilian mixed martial artist who most recently competed in the light heavyweight and middleweight divisions of Bellator MMA, where he was a former Bellator Middleweight World Champion. As of December 2017, Carvalho is tied with Alexander Shlemenko for most title defenses in the division's history. He also won the Smash Fight middleweight championship in 2013.

== Mixed martial arts career ==
=== Early career ===
==== First loss and rebound ====
Carvalho made his professional mixed martial arts debut against Julio Cesar Araujo Fernandes on 17 December 2011 at Samurai FC 6. Carvalho lost the fight via submission in the first round. Following the loss, Carvalho went on a nine-fight unbeaten streak that included a unanimous decision win over Gustavo Machado that won him the Smash Fight middleweight championship, before signing with Bellator MMA.

=== Bellator MMA ===
==== Road to Bellator middleweight title ====
Carvalho was expected to make his promotional debut against fellow newcomer Anthony Ruiz on 19 September 2014 at Bellator 125. However, after an injury to Brett Cooper, Carvalho stepped up and faced Brian Rogers in the co-main event. Carvalho won the back-and-forth fight via TKO in the first round.

Carvalho faced kickboxing veteran Joe Schilling on 10 April 2015 at Bellator 136. He won the fight by split decision.

==== Bellator middleweight champion ====
Carvalho faced Brandon Halsey in the main event at Bellator 144 for the vacant Bellator Middleweight Championship on 23 October 2015. Carvalho stopped Halsey via a body kick in the second round in an upset. Halsey dominated the first round on the ground; almost finishing Carvalho with an arm-triangle choke. With the comeback victory, Carvalho became the first fighter to defeat Halsey.

Carvalho made his first defense of his title against Melvin Manhoef on 20 May 2016 at Bellator 155. He won via a controversial split decision to retain the Bellator Middleweight Championship. Bellator announcer Jimmy Smith called it one of the worst decisions he had ever seen; likewise 5 of 5 media outlets scored the bout in favor of Manhoef.

An immediate rematch with Manhoef was scheduled to take place at Bellator 168, on 10 December 2016. However, Carvalho pulled out of the fight due to injury. The rematch eventually took place on 8 April 2017 at Bellator 176. Carvalho won the bout via knockout due to a head kick in the fourth round. Following the event, Carvalho was fined $5,000 by the Association of Boxing Commissions (ABC) for unsportsmanlike conduct, due to jumping out the cage in his post-fight celebration.

In a May 2017 interview with MMAfighting.com, Carvalho expressed interest in a bout with newly signed welterweight Rory MacDonald after the two exchanged words on Twitter. In addition, he hoped to make his next title defense in July or August.

In his third title defense, Carvalho faced Alessio Sakara at Bellator 190 on 9 December 2017. He won the fight via knockout in the first round. As a result, Carvalho tied the record for most title defenses, held by Alexander Shlemenko, in the divisions' history (three).

In his fourth title defense, Carvalho faced Gegard Mousasi on 25 May 2018 at Bellator 200 in London. This was the last fight on his contract. He lost the fight via technical knock out in round one.

==== Return to contender status ====
On 12 September, it was announced that Carvalho had re-signed with the Bellator MMA promotion. It was also announced that Carvalho is expected to face promotional newcomer and former UFC Light Heavyweight Champion Lyoto Machida on 15 December at Bellator 213. On weigh-in day, Carvalho missed weight, weighing in at 186.5 pounds, over the maximum non-title limit of 186.0 pounds. The bout proceeded at Catchweight and Carvalho was fined 20% of his purse. Carvalho was defeated by split decision.

Carvalho faced Chidi Njokuani at Bellator 224 in a 190 lb Catchweight bout on 12 July 2019. He won the fight by unanimous decision. After the fight with Njokuani, Carvalho announced that he will be moving up to the light heavyweight division.

==== Move up to light heavyweight ====
In his light heavyweight debut, Carvalho faced Vadim Nemkov at Bellator 230 on 13 October 2019. After being largely dominated in the fight, Carvalho lost via submission late in the second round.

Carvalho faced Alex Polizzi at Bellator 245 on 11 September 2020. He lost the fight by unanimous decision.

Bellator MMA announced on 27 October 2020, that Carvalho had been released from the promotion.

After the release from Bellator, Carvalho was set to headline LFA 107 against Sharaf Davlatmurodov on 14 May 2021. However, the bout was called off as Carvalho stepped in as a replacement for Costello van Steenis to face Lorenz Larkin on 6 days notice at Bellator 258 on 7 May 2021. The promotion announced that this bout would be a one off fight deal. Carvalho lost the bout via split decision.

Replacing Tony Johnson, Carvalho faced Dovletdzhan Yagshimuradov on 15 April 2022 at Bellator 277. He lost the fight via TKO in the second round.

=== Post Bellator ===
In his first bout after leaving Bellator, Carvalho faced Marcelo Alfaya on 15 November 2023 at Centurion FC 16, winning the bout and the title via unanimous decision.

==== Global Fight League ====
On 11 December 2024, it was announced that Carvalho was eligible to be drafted in the Global Fight League. However, he was not drafted for the 2025 season. In turn, in April 2025, it was reported that all GFL events were cancelled indefinitely.

== Bare-knuckle boxing ==
=== Bare Knuckle Fighting Championship ===
Carvalho was scheduled to make his BKFC debut on 21 December 2024 against Gilberto Fuentes at BKFC on DAZN: Hollywood, FL. However, the bout was postponed after Carvalho signed with Global Fight League.

== Championships and accomplishments ==
- Bellator MMA
  - Bellator Middleweight World Championship (One time; former)
    - Three successful title defenses
  - Tied with Alexander Shlemenko for the most successful Middleweight title defenses in Bellator history (3)
- MMA Junkie
  - October 2015 Knockout of the Month vs. Brandon Halsey
- Smash Fight
  - Smash Fight Middleweight Championship (One time)

== Mixed martial arts record ==
Professional record breakdown
26 matches	17 wins	9 losses
By knockout	12	3
By submission	0	3
By decision	5	3

Res.	Record	Opponent	Method	Event	Date	Round	Time	Location	Notes
Loss	17–9	Sergey Romanov	Submission (rear-naked choke)	North-West Power Alliance 10	4 October 2025	2	2:03	Saint Petersburg, Russia	Return to Middleweight.
Loss	17–8	Mariusz Książkiewicz	KO (punches)	Iowa Fight Series 2	13 April 2024	4	0:47	Marshalltown, Iowa, United States	For the vacant IF Light Heavyweight Championship.
Win	17–7	Marcelo Alfaya	Decision (unanimous)	Centurion FC 16	15 November 2023	5	5:00	Attard, Malta	Won the vacant Centurion FC Light Heavyweight Championship.
Loss	16–7	Dovletdzhan Yagshimuradov	TKO (elbows and punches)	Bellator 277	15 April 2022	2	4:04	San Jose, California, United States	
Loss	16–6	Lorenz Larkin	Decision (split)	Bellator 258	7 May 2021	3	5:00	Uncasville, Connecticut, United States	Middleweight bout.
Loss	16–5	Alex Polizzi	Decision (unanimous)	Bellator 245	11 September 2020	3	5:00	Uncasville, Connecticut, United States	
Loss	16–4	Vadim Nemkov	Submission (rear-naked choke)	Bellator 230	12 October 2019	2	3:56	Milan, Italy	Light Heavyweight debut.
Win	16–3	Chidi Njokuani	Decision (unanimous)	Bellator 224	12 July 2019	3	5:00	Thackerville, Oklahoma, United States	Catchweight (190 lb) bout.
Loss	15–3	Lyoto Machida	Decision (split)	Bellator 213	15 December 2018	3	5:00	Honolulu, Hawaii, United States	Catchweight (186.5 lb) bout; Carvalho missed weight.
Loss	15–2	Gegard Mousasi	TKO (punches)	Bellator 200	25 May 2018	1	3:35	London, England	Lost the Bellator Middleweight World Championship.
Win	15–1	Alessio Sakara	KO (elbow)	Bellator 190	9 December 2017	1	0:44	Florence, Italy	Defended the Bellator Middleweight World Championship.
Win	14–1	Melvin Manhoef	KO (head kick)	Bellator 176	8 April 2017	4	3:15	Torino, Italy	Defended the Bellator Middleweight World Championship.
Win	13–1	Melvin Manhoef	Decision (split)	Bellator 155	20 May 2016	5	5:00	Boise, Idaho, United States	Defended the Bellator Middleweight World Championship.
Win	12–1	Brandon Halsey	KO (body kick)	Bellator 144	23 October 2015	2	1:42	Uncasville, Connecticut, United States	Won the vacant Bellator Middleweight World Championship.
Win	11–1	Joe Schilling	Decision (split)	Bellator 136	10 April 2015	3	5:00	Irvine, California, United States	
Win	10–1	Brian Rogers	TKO (punches)	Bellator 125	19 September 2014	1	3:06	Fresno, California, United States	
Win	9–1	Mauri Roque	TKO (knee to the body and punches)	Talent MMA Circuit 9	10 May 2014	1	2:47	São José dos Pinhais, Brazil	
Win	8–1	Sergio Souza	TKO (knee to the body and punches)	Iron Fight Combat 4	7 September 2013	3	2:15	São José dos Pinhais, Brazil	
Win	7–1	Gustavo Machado	Decision (unanimous)	SMASH Fight 2	13 July 2013	3	5:00	Curitiba, Brazil	Won the inaugural SMASH Fight Middleweight Championship.
Win	6–1	Fernando Scherek	TKO (punches)	Adventure Fighters Tournament 4	9 March 2013	1	0:39	Curitiba, Brazil	
Win	5–1	Kaue Dudus	TKO (punches)	Samurai FC 9	15 December 2012	2	3:48	Curitiba, Brazil	
Win	4–1	Eduardo Gimenez	TKO (punches)	Empire FC 1	20 October 2012	1	0:55	Curitiba, Paraná, Brazil	
Win	3–1	Luiz Cado Simon	TKO (punches)	Forca Jovem Parana: Nocaute ao Crack 2	25 August 2012	3	N/A	Curitiba, Brazil	
Win	2–1	Glauber Valadares	TKO (punches)	Predador FC 21	11 August 2012	1	2:52	Campo Grande, Brazil	
Win	1–1	Flavio Rodrigo Magon	TKO (punches)	Adrenaline Fight 4	10 March 2012	2	2:42	Apucarana, Brazil	
Loss	0–1	Julio Cesar Araujo Fernandes	Submission (anaconda choke)	Samurai FC 6	17 December 2011	1	N/A	Curitiba, Brazil	Middleweight debut.

== See also ==
- List of male mixed martial artists
