= Julius Anglickas =

Lithuanian mixed martial arts fighter

- Born: July 23, 1991 (age 35); Plungė, Lithuania
- Height: 6 ft 3 in (1.91 m)
- Weight: 205 lb (93 kg; 14 st 9 lb)
- Division: Light Heavyweight
- Reach: 77 in (196 cm)
- Fighting out of: St. Charles, Missouri
- Team: St Charles MMA
- Years active: 2016–present

Mixed martial arts record
- Total: 15
- Wins: 11
- By knockout: 4
- By submission: 4
- By decision: 3
- Losses: 4
- By submission: 2
- By decision: 2

Other information
- Mixed martial arts record from Sherdog

Julius Anglickas (born May 2, 1993) is a Lithuanian mixed martial artist who competes in the Light Heavyweight division. He has previously fought for Bellator MMA, where he fought for the Bellator Light Heavyweight Championship.

== Background ==
Born in Plungė, Lithuania, at the age of 9, Anglickas's parents left him and his brother with their grandmother to move to America to find work. Anglickas moved over to the US when he was 14 years old with his older brother, Gabe.

Anglickas earned a spot on the SUNY Brockport wrestling team after a high school career at Southampton High School that included two top-five finishes at the New York State Division II Tournament. He bounced around during his collegiate days, leaving Brockport for Missouri Baptist, and then transferring to Lindenwood University in St. Charles, Missouri. At Missouri Baptist, Alp Ozkiliz, a graduate assistant encouraged him to start working out at St. Charles MMA, where he became the St. Louis Golden Gloves champion.

Anglickas graduated from Lindenwood University in 2015 with a master’s degree in teaching.

== Mixed martial arts career ==
=== Early career ===
Anglickas made his amateur debut in April 2015. Two months later, he was 4–0 as an amateur with all of those fights ending by first- or second-round finishes. Six months later, he made his pro debut. In his MMA debut, he defeated Eric Crittendon via TKO in the first round. Anglickas suffered his first MMA defeat, losing to Cameron Olson via arm-triangle choke in the third round at Victory FC 51. Anglickas would rebound, defeating Mike Doss via TKO in round three at Shamrock FC 280. Then in his debut fight for Legacy Fighting Alliance at LFA 42, he faced Erick Murray and tapped him out in the third round via rear-naked choke. Anglickas also submitted Braden Erdman via rear-naked choke in the first round. He knocked out Rashid Abdullah in round one. In the main event of LFA 60 Anglickas tapped out Clayton York via rear-naked choke in round two, winning the LFA Light Heavyweight Championship.

At Dana White's Contender Series 24, he submitted Contender Series season one alumni Karl Reed via rear-naked choke in the third round to pick up his fourth submission win as a professional, however he was not offered a UFC contract.

=== Bellator MMA ===
In October 2019, Anglickas signed a 4-fight/16-month contract with Bellator MMA.

In his debut outing with Bellator MMA at Bellator 233 Anglickas defeated Jordan Young via unanimous decision to earn the first decision victory of his professional career.

In his second fight with Bellator at Bellator 251 on November 5, 2020, Anglickas would square off with fellow former LFA Light Heavyweight Champion Alex Polizzi. Again, Anglickas would go on to outpoint his adversary, earning his second ever unanimous decision victory.

At Bellator 257 on April 16, 2021, Anglickas would face Gregory Milliard. The 29-year old Anglickas would go on to earn his tenth professional victory, dominating Milliard throughout the fifteen minute contest.

After Anthony Johnson was forced to pull out of the bout due to illness, Anglickas was chosen as the alternate to face the current Bellator Light Heavyweight Champion Vadim Nemkov in Bellator Light Heavyweight World Grand Prix Tournament on October 16, 2021 at Bellator 268. He lost by fourth round kimura.

At Bellator 276 on March 12, 2022, Anglickas faced Phil Davis. He lost the bout via unanimous decision.

Anglickas faced Dovletdzhan Yagshimuradov on March 10, 2023 at Bellator 292. He lost the bout via unanimous decision.

== Championships and accomplishments ==
- Legacy Fighting Alliance
  - LFA Light Heavyweight Championship (One time)

== Mixed martial arts record ==
Professional record breakdown
15 matches	11 wins	4 losses
By knockout	4	0
By submission	4	2
By decision	3	2

Res.	Record	Opponent	Method	Event	Date	Round	Time	Location	Notes
Win	11–4	Moses Murrietta	KO (punch)	Mecca 23	November 2, 2024	2	3:47	Shakopee, Minnesota, United States	
Loss	10–4	Dovletdzhan Yagshimuradov	Decision (unanimous)	Bellator 292	March 10, 2023	3	5:00	San Jose, California, United States	
Loss	10–3	Phil Davis	Decision (unanimous)	Bellator 276	March 12, 2022	3	5:00	St. Louis, Missouri, United States	
Loss	10–2	Vadim Nemkov	Submission (kimura)	Bellator 268	October 16, 2021	4	4:25	Phoenix, Arizona, United States	Bellator Light Heavyweight World Grand Prix Semifinal. For the Bellator Light Heavyweight World Championship.
Win	10–1	Gregory Milliard	Decision (unanimous)	Bellator 257	April 16, 2021	3	5:00	Uncasville, Connecticut, United States	
Win	9–1	Alex Polizzi	Decision (unanimous)	Bellator 251	November 5, 2020	3	5:00	Uncasville, Connecticut, United States	
Win	8–1	Jordan Young	Decision (unanimous)	Bellator 233	November 8, 2019	3	5:00	Thackerville, Oklahoma, United States	
Win	7–1	Karl Reed	Submission (rear-naked choke)	Dana White's Contender Series 24	August 13, 2019	3	3:25	Las Vegas, Nevada, United States	
Win	6–1	Clayton York	Submission (rear-naked choke)	LFA 60	February 15, 2019	2	4:13	Clive, Iowa, United States	Won the vacant LFA Light Heavyweight Championship.
Win	5–1	Rashid Abdullah	KO (punches)	Nemesis Fighting Alliance: T'was the Fight Before Christmas	December 15, 2018	1	3:39	St. Louis, Missouri, United States	
Win	4–1	Bradan Erdman	Submission (rear-naked choke)	Midwest CF 16	October 27, 2018	1	1:02	North Platte, Nebraska, United States	
Win	3–1	Erick Murray Jr.	Submission (rear-naked choke)	LFA 42	June 8, 2018	3	2:29	Branson, Missouri, United States	
Win	2–1	Mike Doss	TKO (punches)	Shamrock FC 280	December 3, 2016	3	2:30	Kansas City, Missouri, United States	
Loss	1–1	Cameron Olson	Submission (arm-triangle choke)	Victory FC 51	June 24, 2016	3	3:42	Urbandale, Iowa, United States	
Win	1–0	Eric Crittendon	TKO (punches)	Shamrock FC: Blitzkrieg	January 30, 2016	1	0:37	St. Louis, Missouri, United States	Light Heavyweight debut.

== Kickboxing record (incomplete) ==
Professional kickboxing record
1 wins, 0 loss, 0 draw
Date	Result	Opponent	Event	Location	Method	Round	Time	Record
2024-8-3	Win	(United States) Thomas Jenkins	Stand Up Fight Series 7	Missouri, USA	KO/TKO	1	1:12	1-0

== Karate Combat record ==
Professional record breakdown
1 match	0 wins	1 loss
By knockout	0	1

Res.	Record	Opponent	Method	Event	Date	Round	Time	Location	Notes
Loss	0–1	Jayden Eynaud	TKO (spinning backfist)	Karate Combat 53	February 28, 2025	1	1:44	Denver, Colorado, United States	

== See also ==
- List of male mixed martial artists
