= Bellator 268 =

Bellator mixed martial arts event in 2021

Bellator 268: Nemkov vs. Anglickas
- The poster for Bellator 268: Nemkov vs. Anglickas
- Promotion: Bellator MMA
- Date: October 16, 2021
- Venue: Footprint Center
- City: Phoenix, Arizona, United States

Event chronology
Bellator 267: Lima vs. MVP 2	Bellator 268: Nemkov vs. Anglickas	Bellator 269: Fedor vs. Johnson

Bellator 268: Nemkov vs. Anglickas (also known as Bellator Phoenix) was a mixed martial arts event produced by Bellator MMA that took place on October 16, 2021, at the Footprint Center in Phoenix, Arizona, United States.

== Background ==
The event was headlined by both of the high-profile semifinal matchups for the Bellator Light Heavyweight World Grand Prix Tournament and took place at the Footprint Center, home of the Phoenix Suns and Phoenix Mercury. Current Bellator Light Heavyweight Champion Vadim Nemkov was to defend his title against Anthony “Rumble” Johnson, while current Bellator Heavyweight Champion Ryan Bader faced Corey Anderson in the co-main event. On September 18, it was announced that Anthony Johnson was forced to pull out of the bout due to an illness that was to keep him out until 2022. Nemkov instead faced the alternate Julius Anglickas. Anglickas's opponent Karl Albrektsson was rescheduled with Dovletdzhan Yagshimuradov.

A bantamweight bout between Brett Johns and Erik Pérez was scheduled for this event. However on October 5, it was announced that Pérez was injured and the bout was scrapped.

At the weigh-ins, Bobby Lee missed weight for his bout. Lee weighed in at 156.8 pounds, 0.8 pounds over the lightweight non-title fight limit. The bout proceeded at catchweight and Lee was fined a percentage of his purse which went to his opponent Nick Browne.

== Results ==
Main Card (Showtime)
Weight class				Method	Round	Time	Notes
Light Heavyweight	Vadim Nemkov (c)	def.	Julius Anglickas	Submission (kimura)	4	4:25	(Note: Bellator Light Heavyweight World Grand Prix Tournament Semi-Final bout for the Bellator Light Heavyweight World Championship)
Light Heavyweight	Corey Anderson	def.	Ryan Bader	TKO (punches)	1	0:51	(Note: Bellator Light Heavyweight World Grand Prix Tournament Semi-Final bout.)
Lightweight	Brent Primus	def.	Benson Henderson	Decision (unanimous) (29-28, 30-27, 30-27)	3	5:00
Featherweight	Henry Corrales	def.	Vladyslav Parubchenko	Decision (unanimous) (30-27, 30-27, 30-27)	3	5:00
Preliminary card (Youtube/Pluto TV)
Light Heavyweight	Karl Albrektsson	def.	Dovletdzhan Yagshimuradov	Decision (unanimous) (29–28, 29–28, 29–28)	3	5:00
Welterweight	Mukhamed Berkhamov	def.	Jaleel Willis	Submission (guillotine choke)	1	4:05
Catchweight (156.8 lb)	Nick Browne	def.	Bobby Lee	Submission (heel hook)	1	1:38	(Note: Originally a lightweight bout; Lee missed weight.)
Middleweight	Javier Torres	def.	Gregory Milliard	Decision (split) (28–29, 29–28, 29–28)	3	5:00
Women's Flyweight	Sumiko Inaba	def.	Randi Field	Submission (arm-triangle choke)	2	2:02
Lightweight	Lance Gibson Jr.	def.	Raymond Pina	TKO (punches)	2	1:44
Bantamweight	Jaylon Bates	def.	Raphael Montini	Submission (armbar)	1	3:49
Light Heavyweight	Sullivan Cauley	def.	Deon Clash	TKO (elbows and punches)	1	4:59
Amateur bout
Women's Flyweight	Maria Henderson	def.	Collette Santiago	Submission (rear-naked choke)	1	0:40

== Reported payout ==
The following is the reported payout to the fighters as reported to the Arizona Department of Gaming. The figures do not include discretionary bonuses or sponsorship money. The amounts do not include sponsor money, discretionary bonuses, viewership points or additional earnings. The total disclosed payout for the event was $1,353,300.

MAIN CARD (10 p.m. E.T., Showtime)

- Vadim Nemkov: $250,000 (includes $75,000 win bonus) def. Julius Anglickas: $150,000
- Corey Anderson: $200,000 (includes $100,000 win bonus) def. Ryan Bader: $150,000
- Brent Primus: $50,000 (no win bonus) def. Benson Henderson: $150,000
- Henry Corrales: $50,000 (includes $25,000 win bonus) def. Vladyslav Parubchenko: $10,000
- Karl Albrektsson: $50,000 (includes $25,000 win bonus) def. Dovletdzhan Yagshimuradov: $70,000

PRELIMS (7 p.m. E.T., YouTube/PlutoTV)

- Mukhamed Berkhamov: $60,000 (includes $30,000 win bonus) def. Jaleel Willis: $24,000
- Nick Browne: $37,200 (includes $18,000 win bonus, $1,200 fine from Lee) def. Bobby Lee: $9,600 (includes $2,400 deduction)
- Javier Torres: $20,000 (includes $10,000 win bonus) def. Gregory Millard: $13,000
- Sumiko Inaba: $10,000 (includes $5,000 win bonus) def. Randi Field: $4,000
- Lance Gibson Jr.: $14,000 (includes $7,000 win bonus) def. Raymond Pina: $3,000
- Jaylon Bates: $20,000 (no win bonus) def. Raphael Montini: $2,500
- Sullivan Cauley: $4,000 (includes $2,000 win bonus) def. Deon Clash: $2,000

== See also ==
- 2021 in Bellator MMA
- List of Bellator MMA events
- List of current Bellator fighters
