= Bellator 269 =

Bellator mixed martial arts event in 2021

Bellator 269: Fedor vs. Johnson
- The poster for Bellator 269: Fedor vs. Johnson
- Promotion: Bellator MMA
- Date: October 23, 2021
- Venue: VTB Arena
- City: Moscow, Russia

Event chronology
Bellator 268: Nemkov vs. Anglickas	Bellator 269: Fedor vs. Johnson	Bellator 270: Queally vs. Pitbull 2

Bellator 269: Fedor vs. Johnson (also known as Bellator Moscow) was a mixed martial arts event produced by Bellator MMA that took place on October 23, 2021, at VTB Arena in Moscow, Russia.

== Background ==
On the second last bout of his contract, Fedor Emelianenko was announced to be returning on October 23, 2021, against a TBA opponent at the VTB Arena in Moscow. The opponent was later revealed to be #2 ranked Timothy Johnson.

A heavyweight bout between Vitaly Minakov and Tyrell Fortune was scheduled as a comain for this event. However in August, it was announced that Fortune pulled out for unknown reasons and was replaced by Said Sowma.

A welterweight bout between Grachik Bozinyan and Ross Houston was scheduled for this event, however Houston had to pull out of the bout due to medical issues. Bozinyan was rescheduled against Alexey Shurkevich, whose opponent Christian Eckerlin also pulled out.

A welterweight bout between Rustam Khabilov and Andrey Koreshkov was scheduled for this event. However the bout was scrapped after Khabilov came down with a sickness.

A lightweight bout between Vladimir Tokov and Aymard Guih was scheduled for this event, however Guih was not allowed to fight for medical reasons the day before the event and the bout was scratched.

At the weigh-ins, Aiden Lee and Gadzhi Rabadanov missed weight for his bout. Lee weighed in at 147.5 pounds, 1.5 pounds over the featherweight non-title fight limit and Rabadanov weighed in at 148.8 lb, 2.8 pounds over the featherweight limit. Aiden Lee vs. Alexander Osetrov bout proceeded at catchweight and Lee was fined a percentage of his purse which went to his opponent. Gadzhi Rabadanov vs. Alexander Belikh however was scrapped due to medical complication from Gadzhi's weight cut.

== Results ==
Fight card (Showtime)
Weight class				Method	Round	Time	Notes
Heavyweight	Fedor Emelianenko	def.	Timothy Johnson	KO (punches)	1	1:46
Heavyweight	Said Sowma	def.	Vitaly Minakov	TKO (finger injury)	3	3:08
Catchweight (160 lb)	Usman Nurmagomedov	def.	Patrik Pietilä	Submission (rear-naked choke)	1	4:06
Middleweight	Anatoly Tokov	def.	Sharaf Davlatmurodov	Decision (split) (28-29, 29-28, 29-28)	3	5:00
Preliminary card (Youtube/Pluto TV)
Heavyweight	Kirill Sidelnikov	def.	Rab Truesdale	TKO (punches)	1	2:01
Women's Flyweight	Katarzyna Sadura	def.	Darina Mazdyuk	TKO (punches)	2	3:17
Catchweight (130 lb)	Irina Alekseeva	def.	Stephanie Ielö Page	Decision (unanimous) (30-27, 30-27, 29-28)	3	5:00
Bantamweight	Nikita Mikhailov	def.	Brian Moore	Decision (unanimous) (29-28, 29-28, 29-28)	3	5:00
Welterweight	Alexey Shurkevich	def.	Grachik Bozinyan	KO (punches)	1	2:25
Catchweight (147.5 lb)	Aiden Lee	def.	Alexander Osetrov	Submission (rear-naked choke)	1	3:41	(Note: Originally a featherweight bout; Lee missed weight.)

== See also ==
- 2021 in Bellator MMA
- List of Bellator MMA events
- List of current Bellator fighters
