= Henry Corrales =

American mixed martial arts fighter

- Born: August 11, 1986 (age 40); Moraga, California, U.S.
- Other names: OK
- Height: 5 ft 8 in (1.73 m)
- Weight: 145 lb (66 kg; 10.4 st)
- Division: Featherweight; Bantamweight
- Reach: 70 in (178 cm)
- Fighting out of: Redlands, California, United States; Whittier, California, United States
- Team: De La O Jiu Jitsu; All In MMA (formerly); The MMA Lab (2016–2019); Fight Ready (2019–present)
- Years active: 2011–present

Mixed martial arts record
- Total: 29
- Wins: 21
- By knockout: 7
- By submission: 6
- By decision: 8
- Losses: 8
- By knockout: 1
- By submission: 3
- By decision: 4

Other information
- Mixed martial arts record from Sherdog

Henry Corrales (born August 11, 1986), is an American mixed martial artist currently competing in the Featherweight division. A professional since 2011, he has competed for of Bellator MMA and King of the Cage, where he is the former Featherweight and Bantamweight Champion.

== Background ==
Born in Moraga, California and raised in La Mirada, California, Corrales attended La Mirada High School. Growing up in rough neighborhoods, Corrales got into street fights constantly and eventually participated in a mixed martial arts bout at the age of 23.

== Mixed martial arts career ==
=== Early career ===
Corrales made his professional debut in the spring of 2011, winning his first six fights before being given a title shot for the King of the Cage Featherweight Championship. Corrales won via split decision, and defended his title once before dropping down to the Bantamweight division. He defeated then-KOTC Bantamweight Champion Alejandro Garcia at KOTC: Slugfest on June 5, 2014, to hold both titles.

Corrales defended each title once more before signing with Bellator MMA in mid-2015.

=== Bellator MMA ===
Corrales made his promotional debut at Bellator 138 on June 19, 2015, against former Bellator Featherweight Champion Daniel Straus. He was defeated in the second round via submission, and handed his first professional loss.

His next bout came against Emmanuel Sanchez at Bellator 143 on September 25, 2015. He was defeated by split decision.

Corrales faced former Bellator Featherweight champion Patrício Freire at Bellator 153 on April 22, 2016, stepping in at the last minute to replace an injured John Teixeira. Corrales was defeated via third-round submission.

Corrales was scheduled to meet rising prospect A.J. McKee at Bellator 160 on August 26, 2016. However, the bout was scrapped when Corrales announced he was injured.

Corrales returned to face Cody Bollinger at Bellator 170 on January 21, 2017. He won the bout via second-round TKO, picking up his first Bellator victory in the process. He then picked up three consecutive wins before being matched up with former Olympic wrestler and touted MMA prospect Aaron Pico at Bellator 214 on January 26, 2019. In a thrilling but quick bout, Corrales was knocked down early by Pico but was able to come back and knock Pico out with a right hook from the clinch.

==== Bellator Featherweight Grand Prix ====
After the big win over Pico which brought his win streak to five, Corrales faced former Bellator Bantamweight Champion Darrion Caldwell at Bellator 228 in the opening round of the Bellator Featherweight World Grand Prix on September 28, 2019. Corrales was defeated via unanimous decision.

==== Post-GP reign ====
Corrales next faced Juan Archuleta at Bellator 238 on January 25, 2020. He lost the fight by unanimous decision.

Corrales faced Brandon Girtz at Bellator 250 on October 29, 2020. He won the fight via split decision. Following the bout, Corrales announced his intentions to return to the bantamweight division.

Corrales was scheduled to make his return to bantamweight against Keith Lee at Bellator 258 on May 7, 2021. However, Lee pulled out of the bout and was replaced by Johnny Campbell. In an upset, Corrales lost the bout via rear-naked choke submission after getting dropped in the second round.

Corrales faced Vladyslav Parubchenko on October 16, 2021, at Bellator 268. He won the fight via unanimous decision.

As the last bout of his prevailing contract, Corrales faced Aiden Lee on January 29, 2022, at Bellator 273. After an accidental eyepoke in the third round rendered Lee unable to continue, the bout went to the judges who scored the bout a unanimous decision victory for Corrales.

Corrales faced Akhmed Magomedov on February 4, 2023, at Bellator 290. He won the bout via unanimous decision.

Corrales faced Kai Kamaka III on October 7, 2023, at Bellator 300. He lost the fight via split decision. 4 out of 4 media scores gave it to Corrales.

Corrales stepped in on short notice to replace Gabriel Alves Braga and rematch against Aaron Pico on February 24, 2024, at PFL vs. Bellator. Corrales lost the bout via TKO in the first round.

== Championships and accomplishments ==
- King of the Cage
  - KOTC Featherweight Championship (One time)
    - Two successful title defenses
  - KOTC Bantamweight Championship (One time)
    - One successful title defense

== Mixed martial arts record ==
Professional record breakdown
29 matches	21 wins	8 losses
By knockout	7	1
By submission	6	3
By decision	8	4

Res.	Record	Opponent	Method	Event	Date	Round	Time	Location	Notes
Loss	21–8	Aaron Pico	TKO (punches)	PFL vs. Bellator	February 24, 2024	1	4:53	Riyadh, Saudi Arabia	Lightweight bout.
Loss	21–7	Kai Kamaka III	Decision (split)	Bellator 300	October 7, 2023	3	5:00	San Diego, California, United States	
Win	21–6	Akhmed Magomedov	Decision (unanimous)	Bellator 290	February 4, 2023	3	5:00	Inglewood, California, United States	
Win	20–6	Aiden Lee	Technical Decision (unanimous)	Bellator 273	January 29, 2022	3	0:41	Phoenix, Arizona, United States	Accidental eyepoke rendered Lee unable to continue.
Win	19–6	Vladyslav Parubchenko	Decision (unanimous)	Bellator 268	October 16, 2021	3	5:00	Phoenix, Arizona, United States	
Loss	18–6	Johnny Campbell	Submission (rear-naked choke)	Bellator 258	May 7, 2021	2	4:12	Uncasville, Connecticut, United States	Bantamweight bout.
Win	18–5	Brandon Girtz	Decision (split)	Bellator 250	October 28, 2020	3	5:00	Uncasville, Connecticut, United States	
Loss	17–5	Juan Archuleta	Decision (unanimous)	Bellator 238	January 25, 2020	3	5:00	Inglewood, California, United States	
Loss	17–4	Darrion Caldwell	Decision (unanimous)	Bellator 228	September 28, 2019	3	5:00	Inglewood, California, United States	Bellator Featherweight World Grand Prix Opening Round.
Win	17–3	Aaron Pico	KO (punches)	Bellator 214	January 26, 2019	1	1:07	Inglewood, California, United States	
Win	16–3	Andy Main	TKO (punches)	Bellator 208	October 13, 2018	3	2:08	Uniondale, New York, United States	
Win	15–3	Georgi Karakhanyan	Decision (unanimous)	Bellator 192	January 20, 2018	3	5:00	Inglewood, California, United States	
Win	14–3	Noad Lahat	Decision (unanimous)	Bellator 182	August 25, 2017	3	5:00	Verona, New York, United States	
Win	13–3	Cody Bollinger	TKO (body punch)	Bellator 170	January 21, 2017	3	4:28	Inglewood, California, United States	
Loss	12–3	Patrício Pitbull	Submission (guillotine choke)	Bellator 153	April 22, 2016	2	4:09	Uncasville, Connecticut, United States	
Loss	12–2	Emmanuel Sanchez	Decision (split)	Bellator 143	September 25, 2015	3	5:00	Hidalgo, Texas, United States	
Loss	12–1	Daniel Straus	Submission (guillotine choke)	Bellator 138	June 19, 2015	2	3:47	St. Louis, Missouri, United States	
Win	12–0	Aaron Neveu	KO (punch)	KOTC: Coming Home	March 15, 2015	2	0:43	San Jacinto, California, United States	Defended the KOTC Bantamweight Championship.
Win	11–0	Seth Dikun	Submission (guillotine choke)	KOTC: Battle for the Belt	October 2, 2014	2	2:29	Highland, California, United States	Defended the KOTC Bantamweight Championship.
Win	10–0	Alejandro Garcia	TKO (doctor stoppage)	KOTC: Slugfest	June 5, 2014	2	0:40	Highland, California, United States	Defended the KOTC Bantamweight Championship.
Win	9–0	Seth Dikun	TKO (doctor stoppage)	KOTC: Beaten Path	March 6, 2014	3	5:00	Highland, California, United States	Defended the KOTC Bantamweight Championship.
Win	8–0	Jerod Spoon	Decision (split)	KOTC: Terrified	October 31, 2013	5	5:00	Highland, California, United States	Won the vacant KOTC Bantamweight Championship.
Win	7–0	Gustavo Limon	KO	KOTC: Split Decision	August 29, 2013	1	0:20	Highland, California, United States	
Win	6–0	Cooper Gibson	Decision (unanimous)	KOTC: Validation	July 11, 2013	3	5:00	Highland, California, United States	
Win	5–0	Mike Christensen	Submission (kimura)	KOTC: Devastation	April 11, 2013	2	3:02	Highland, California, United States	Catchweight (149 lbs) bout.
Win	4–0	Steve Crosby	Submission (keylock)	Gladiator Challenge: Holiday Beatings	December 16, 2007	1	N/A	San Jacinto, California, United States	
Win	3–0	Max Ceniceros	Submission (guillotine choke)	Long Beach Fight Night 14	May 6, 2012	2	1:16	Long Beach, California, United States	
Win	2–0	Ruben Rosas	Submission (armbar)	Long Beach Fight Night 13	November 20, 2011	2	2:50	Long Beach, California, United States	
Win	1–0	Emilio Gonzales	Submission (rear-naked choke)	Long Beach Fight Night 12	May 1, 2011	1	2:40	Long Beach, California, United States	
