= Bellator 256 =

Bellator mixed martial arts event in 2021

Bellator 256: Bader vs. Machida 2
- The poster for Bellator 256: Bader vs. Machida 2
- Promotion: Bellator MMA
- Date: April 9, 2021
- Venue: Mohegan Sun Arena
- City: Uncasville, Connecticut, United States

Event chronology
Bellator 255: Pitbull vs. Sanchez 2	Bellator 256: Bader vs. Machida 2	Bellator 257: Nemkov vs. Davis 2

Bellator 256: Bader vs. Machida 2 was a mixed martial arts event produced by Bellator MMA that took place on April 9, 2021, at Mohegan Sun Arena in Uncasville, Connecticut.

== Background ==
The event was headlined by a Quarterfinal of the Bellator Light Heavyweight World Grand Prix Tournament. The headliner was a rematch between former Bellator Light Heavyweight World Champion Ryan Bader and former UFC Light Heavyweight Champion Lyoto Machida.

The co-main event was to feature Corey Anderson facing off against former ACA Light Heavyweight Champion Dovletdzhan Yagshimuradov. However, on March 26, it was announced that the bout will be moved to Bellator 257.

Jeffrey Glossner failed to make weight, coming 1.8 pounds over the limit for his bantamweight bout and has been fined a percentage of his purse.

== Results ==
Main card (Showtime)
Weight class				Method	Round	Time	Notes
Light Heavyweight	Ryan Bader	def.	Lyoto Machida	Decision (unanimous) (49–46, 49–45, 49–45)	5	5:00	(Note: Bellator Light Heavyweight World Grand Prix Tournament Quarter-Final bout.)
Women's Flyweight	Liz Carmouche	def.	Vanessa Porto	Decision (unanimous) (29–28, 30–27, 30–27)	3	5:00
Featherweight	Ádám Borics	def.	Jeremy Kennedy	Decision (unanimous) (30–27, 29–28, 29–28)	3	5:00
Women's Featherweight	Cat Zingano	def.	Olivia Parker	Submission (armbar)	1	2:56
Lightweight	Dan Moret	def.	Goiti Yamauchi	Decision (split) (29–28, 29–28, 29–28)	3	5:00
Preliminary card (Youtube/Pluto TV)
Middleweight	Dalton Rosta	def.	Tony Johnson	Decision (unanimous) (30–27, 30–27, 30–27)	3	5:00
Women's Featherweight	Talita Nogueira	def.	Jessica Borga	Decision (unanimous) (29–27, 29–27, 29–27)	3	5:00	(Note: Nogueira was deducted a point in Round 2 due to repeated blows to the back of the head.)
Bantamweight	Jornel Lugo	def.	Cass Bell	Decision (unanimous) (30–26, 30–27, 30–27)	3	5:00
Featherweight	Cody Law	def.	Nathan Ghareeb	Decision (unanimous) (30–27, 30–27, 30–27)	3	5:00
Catchweight (137.8 lb)	Jaylon Bates	def.	Jeffrey Glossner	Submission (Japanese necktie)	2	1:27	(Note: Glossner missed weight and was fined 20% of his purse.)
Lightweight	Nainoa Dung	def.	Izzy William	Decision (unanimous) (30–27, 29–28, 29–28)	3	5:00
Women's Flyweight	Diana Avsaragova	def.	Tara Graff	KO (punches)	1	0:29
Bantamweight	John Douma	def.	Will Smith	Decision (split) (29–28, 28–29, 29–28)	3	5:00

== See also ==
- 2021 in Bellator MMA
- List of Bellator MMA events
- List of current Bellator fighters
