= Aaron Pico =

American wrestler and mixed martial artist (born 1996)

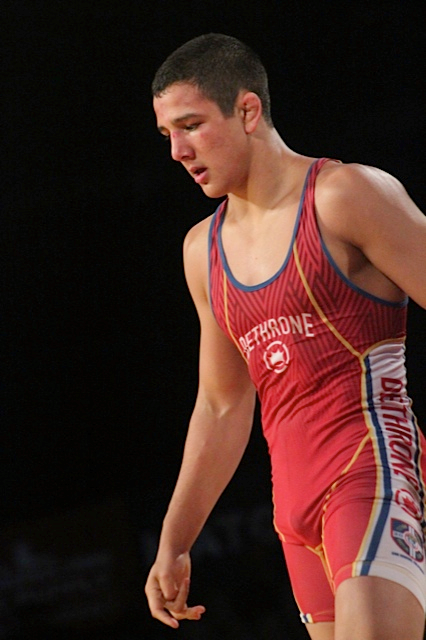
- Pico in 2014
- Born: September 23, 1996 (age 30); Whittier, California, U.S.
- Height: 5 ft 8 in (173 cm)
- Weight: 145 lb (66 kg; 10.4 st)
- Division: Lightweight (155 lbs) (2017); Featherweight (145 lbs) (2017–present)
- Reach: 70 1/2 in (179 cm)
- Style: Wrestling, Boxing, Pankration
- Fighting out of: Whittier, California, U.S.
- Team: American Kickboxing Academy (2014–2017); The Body Shop MMA (2017–2019); Jackson Wink MMA Academy (2019–present)
- Trainer: Greg Jackson (Head Coach); Valentin Kalika, Sazhid Sazhidov (formerly) (Wrestling); Sam Calavitta (Strength and Conditioning); Roberto Alencar (Brazilian Jiu-Jitsu); Freddie Roach (Boxing); Brandon Gibson (MMA trainer)
- Rank: Blue belt in Brazilian Jiu-Jitsu under Roberto Alencar
- Wrestling: Freestyle wrestling Greco-Roman wrestling
- Years active: 2017–present

Mixed martial arts record
- Total: 20
- Wins: 15
- By knockout: 10
- By submission: 2
- By decision: 3
- Losses: 5
- By knockout: 4
- By submission: 1

Other information
- Mixed martial arts record from Sherdog

Aaron Pico (born September 23, 1996) is an American mixed martial artist and freestyle wrestler. He currently competes in the featherweight division of the Ultimate Fighting Championship (UFC). Pico started out his career in Bellator MMA, where he fought his first 17 bouts. As of November 7, 2026, he is #9 in the Meta UFC featherweight rankings.

He is currently signed to the Lightweight division of Real American Freestyle (RAF). In freestyle wrestling, Pico competed at 65 kilograms, where he was an Olympic alternate in 2016, as well as a U17 World champion in 2013.

== Early life ==
Pico was born September 23, 1996, in Whittier, California. He is a seventh-generation Californio and a member of the Pico family of California, as great-great-great-great-grandson of Pío Pico, the last governor of California under Mexico rule and the 10th Governor of Alta California. Pico started wrestling at the age of four, and competed in multiple other combat sports. At age ten, he began boxing and competing in Pankration tournaments.

== Wrestling career ==
=== High school ===
During his freshman year of high school, Pico capped off a perfect 42–0 season at St. John Bosco High School and won the CIF state championship at 132 pounds. Afterwards, Pico would compete in freestyle, claiming the U17 World title at 63 kilograms over Japan in the title match. He made his senior freestyle debut at age 18, defeating Alibeggadzhi Emeev in a lopsided decision in a dual meet against Russia.

The top-ranked high school wrestler in the country in 2014, he signed major endorsement contracts with Dethrone Royalty, an MMA lifestyle apparel company, and a multi-year shoe endorsement with Nike, Inc., turning into a professional athlete and making him ineligible to compete in collegiate wrestling under NCAA rules. Pico stated he intended to focus solely in freestyle to continue a mixed martial arts career after a 2016 Olympic run, foregoing further education. Before his MMA debut, Pico explained:

"I always had it in mind that I would be an MMA fighter. I'm not going to waste my time with four, five years of college and get my MMA career started. I said I'm going to be in MMA so, I want to try and make this Olympic team, win a gold and then become a MMA fighter."

=== Post-high school career ===
==== 2014 ====
In 2014, Pico claimed the U20 US National Championship in April by defeating Penn State's Zain Retherford in the finals, and went on to defeat him two more times in June for the U20 US World Team spot.

In July, Pico competed in the senior level, claiming a silver medal from the Grand Prix of Spain, only falling to World medalist from Italy Frank Chamizo. In August, he competed at the U20 World Championships, where he notably defeated Daichi Takatani from Japan in the first round, and went on to defeat four more foreign opponents by technical fall before facing eventual 2016 Olympic Gold medalist from Iran Hassan Yazdani, whom he lost to on points.

In October, Pico placed third at the prestigious Soslan Andiev International in Russia. In November, he claimed his first senior level gold medal, winning the Henri Deglane Grand Prix, earning the biggest win of his career over 2013 World Champion from Armenia David Safaryan in the finals.

==== 2015 ====
To start off the year, he competed at the Golden Grand Prix Ivan Yarygin in January, placing 21st after a first-round loss to Akhmed Chakaev. In February, he claimed the Cerro Pelado International title, defeating Pan American champions from Cuba Franklin Marén and Alejandro Valdés, as well as two-time US World Team Member Reece Humphrey.

In April, Pico fell to Dan Hodge Trophy winner Brent Metcalf in a dual meet against Iowa. He then went back to the U20 level to claim the US National Championship in May and the US World Team spot in June, defeating Zain Retherford three times in the process. In August, Pico placed third at the U20 World Championships, bringing a bronze medal to the United States.

Back to the senior level, Pico placed fifth at the Intercontinental Cup, third at the Bill Farrell International and fourth at the US National Championships (qualifying for the 2016 US Olympic Team Trials) before the year ended.

==== 2016 ====
To open up the year, Pico moved up to 70 kilograms for two tournaments, placing fifth at the Ukrainian International Open and third at the Alexander Medved Prizes, compiling notable victories over three-time NCAA DIII champion Nazar Kulchytskyy, 2010 Asian Games Gold medalist from Mongolia Ganzorigiin Mandakhnaran and 2015 U23 European Continental medalist from Belarus Andrei Karpach.

At the US Olympic Team Trials, Pico defeated 2010 NCAA champion Jason Ness, two-time NCAA champion and US National finalist Jordan Oliver and three-time US National champion Reece Humphrey to make the best-of-three finals, where he would face reigning Pan American champion and 2012 NCAA champion Frank Molinaro, whom he was 2–1 against. After defeating Molinaro first round, Pico was defeated twice in closely-scored matches, losing in the best-of-three format and becoming the alternate. This was Pico's last wrestling match before transitioning into MMA.

==== 2026 ====
Pico signed with Real American Freestyle (RAF) on April 30, 2026.

He defeated Lance Palmer by technical fall at RAF 10 on June 13, 2026.

== Boxing and pankration ==
In addition to wrestling, Pico also competed in boxing and Pankration. Pico won the national PAL championship in 2008 and was national Junior Golden Gloves champion in 2009, he won 'most outstanding boxer' at both tournaments. In Pankration, Pico also was a national champion in 2008. In addition, Pico went to Ukraine in 2010, and won the golden cup European Pankration championship. During this time Pico also won the California state championships in both sports.

== Mixed martial arts career ==
Pico signed an endorsement contract with Dethrone Royalty, an MMA lifestyle apparel company owned by Nick Swinmurn, founder of Zappos and ownership partner of the Golden State Warriors.

In April 2014, Aaron signed a multi-year shoe endorsement with Nike.

=== Bellator MMA ===
In early November 2014, Aaron signed a long term contract with MMA promoter Bellator MMA and its parent company Viacom, as their new blue chip prospect. Bellator MMA President, Scott Coker stated, "Simply put, Aaron has all the makings of MMA's next great superstar, and to have him here at Bellator MMA is something special. Like many of us in the MMA community, Aaron is someone we've been watching closely over the last few years, and after sitting down with Bob Cook and his team, getting a chance to meet Aaron, and hearing his long-term aspirations, the fit became very obvious."

Pico made his professional MMA debut at Bellator NYC on June 24, 2017, at the Madison Square Garden. He lost to Zach Freeman via submission just 24 seconds into the first round in an upset.

After his upset loss to Freeman, Pico moved down to the featherweight division and faced Justin Linn at Bellator 183 on September 23, 2017. He won the fight via knockout in the first round.

Pico faced Shane Krutchen at Bellator 192 on January 20, 2018. He won the fight via TKO in the first round. with a brutal left to Krutchen's body.

Pico faced Lee Morrison at Bellator 199 on May 12, 2018. He won the fight via TKO in the first round.

Pico faced Leandro Higo at Bellator 206 on September 29, 2018. He won the fight via technical knockout in round one.

Pico faced Henry Corrales at Bellator 214 on January 26, 2019. He lost the fight via knockout in the first round.

Pico faced Ádám Borics at Bellator 222 on June 14, 2019. He lost the fight via technical knockout in the second round.

Pico faced Daniel Carey at Bellator 238 on January 25, 2020. He won the fight via knockout in the second round.

Pico faced Chris Hatley Jr. at Bellator 242 on July 24, 2020. He won the fight via submission in the first round.

Pico faced John de Jesus at Bellator 252 on November 12, 2020. He won via second round knockout.

Pico was expected to face Aiden Lee on April 16, 2021, at Bellator 257. However, on April 4, Pico had to pull out of the bout due to medical issues. The fight eventually took place at Bellator 260 on June 11, 2021. He won the fight via submission in the third round.

Pico faced Justin Gonzales on November 12, 2021, at Bellator 271. He won the bout in dominant fashion via unanimous decision.

As the first bout of his new, multi-fight contract Pico was scheduled to face Jeremy Kennedy on April 15, 2022, at Bellator 277. However, Kennedy withdrew 8 days before the event and Adli Edwards replaced him. He won the bout via TKO in the third round.

The bout against Jeremy Kennedy was rebooked for October 1, 2022, at Bellator 286. After hurting his shoulder mid way through the first round, the bout was stopped after the first round by the doctor. It was later revealed that Pico had not sustained a break, just a dislocation.

Pico was scheduled to return from injury against Otto Rodrigues on April 22, 2023, at Bellator 295. However, Rodrigues had to pull out with injury in early April and was replaced by James Gonzalez. He won the bout via unanimous decision.

Pico faced Pedro Carvalho on September 23, 2023, at Bellator 299. He won the fight via ground and pound TKO in the first round.

Pico was scheduled to face Gabriel Alves Braga on February 24, 2024, at PFL vs. Bellator. Braga was pulled from the bout and booked against Patrício Pitbull on the same card, while Pico was booked in a rematch against Henry Corrales. Pico won the bout via TKO in the first round.

On December 31, 2024, Pico's agent announced that his contract and the matching period was expiring in January, making him a free agent.

=== Ultimate Fighting Championship ===
On April 8, 2025, it was reported that Pico had signed with the UFC.

Pico was reportedly going to make his debut with the UFC against undefeated contender Movsar Evloev on May 17, 2025 at UFC Fight Night 256. However, on an interview, Pico revealed that although it was close to being signed, the bout did not come to fruition. The fight was re-scheduled to take place on July 26, 2025 at UFC on ABC 9. However, under two weeks prior to this event, Evloev had to withdraw due to an injury.

Pico faced Lerone Murphy on August 16, 2025 at UFC 319. He lost the fight via knockout with a spinning back elbow in the first round.

Pico faced Patrício Pitbull on April 11, 2026 at UFC 327. He won the fight by unanimous decision.

Pico was scheduled to face Arnold Allen on October 24, 2026 at UFC 333. However, Allen withdrew due to an injury and was replaced by Losene Keita. Pico won the fight by technical knockout in the first round.

== Personal life ==
Aaron Pico is a seventh generation Californio. Pico is a direct descendant of Pío de Jesus Pico, who was the last Mexican Governor of California under the Providence of Mexico.

Pico and his wife Kylie have a son born in 2021.

== Championships and accomplishments ==
=== Mixed martial arts ===
- MMA Sucka
  - 2018 Non-UFC Breakout Star of the Year

=== Freestyle wrestling ===
- 2016 US Olympic Team Trials Senior Men Freestyle 65 kg 2nd place
- 2016 Alexander Medved International Senior Men Freestyle 65 kg Bronze Medal
- 2015 Cerro Pelado International Senior Men Freestyle 65 kg Champion – Havana, Cuba
- 2014 Henri Deglane Challenge Senior Men Freestyle 65 kg Champion – Nice, France
- 2014 Soslan Andiyev Senior Men Freestyle 70 kg Bronze Medal – North Ossetia – Alania, Russia
- 2014 Grand Prix of Spain Senior Men Freestyle 65 kg Silver Medal – Madrid, Spain

=== Boxing ===
- 2008 Desert Showdown Champ – Indio, CA
- 2008 California State PAL Champ – Oxnard, CA
- 2008 National PAL Champ – Tournament Outstanding Boxer Award– Oxnard, CA
- 2009 Desert Showdown Champ – Indio, CA
- 2009 National Junior Golden Gloves Championship Champ – Mesquite, NV Tournament Outstanding Boxer Award

=== Pankration ===
- 2008 – CA State Pankration Championships Champ – Santa Ana, CA
- 2008 – National Pankration Championships Champ – Santa Ana, CA
- 2009 – CA State Pankration Championships Champ – Santa Ana, CA
- 2010 – Golden Cup European Pankration Champ – Kharkov, Ukraine

== Mixed martial arts record ==
Professional record breakdown
| 20 matches | 15 wins | 5 losses |
| By knockout | 10 | 4 |
| By submission | 2 | 1 |
| By decision | 3 | 0 |

| Res. | Record | Opponent | Method | Event | Date | Round | Time | Location | Notes |
|---|---|---|---|---|---|---|---|---|---|
| Win | 15–5 | Losene Keita | TKO (punches) | UFC 333 | October 24, 2026 | 1 | 1:14 | Abu Dhabi, United Arab Emirates | |
| Win | 14–5 | Patrício Pitbull | Decision (unanimous) | UFC 327 | April 11, 2026 | 3 | 5:00 | Miami, Florida, United States | |
| Loss | 13–5 | Lerone Murphy | KO (spinning back elbow) | UFC 319 | August 16, 2025 | 1 | 3:21 | Chicago, Illinois, United States | |
| Win | 13–4 | Henry Corrales | TKO (punches) | PFL vs. Bellator | February 24, 2024 | 1 | 4:53 | Riyadh, Saudi Arabia | Lightweight bout. |
| Win | 12–4 | Pedro Carvalho | TKO (punches) | Bellator 299 | September 23, 2023 | 1 | 3:05 | Dublin, Ireland | |
| Win | 11–4 | James Gonzalez | Decision (unanimous) | Bellator 295 | April 22, 2023 | 3 | 5:00 | Honolulu, Hawaii, United States | |
| Loss | 10–4 | Jeremy Kennedy | TKO (shoulder injury) | Bellator 286 | October 1, 2022 | 1 | 5:00 | Long Beach, California, United States | |
| Win | 10–3 | Adli Edwards | TKO (punches) | Bellator 277 | April 15, 2022 | 3 | 0:55 | San Jose, California, United States | Catchweight (150 lb) bout. |
| Win | 9–3 | Justin Gonzales | Decision (unanimous) | Bellator 271 | November 12, 2021 | 3 | 5:00 | Hollywood, Florida, United States | |
| Win | 8–3 | Aiden Lee | Submission (anaconda choke) | Bellator 260 | June 11, 2021 | 3 | 1:33 | Uncasville, Connecticut, United States | |
| Win | 7–3 | John de Jesus | KO (punch) | Bellator 252 | November 12, 2020 | 2 | 4:12 | Uncasville, Connecticut, United States | |
| Win | 6–3 | Chris Hatley | Submission (rear-naked choke) | Bellator 242 | July 24, 2020 | 1 | 2:10 | Uncasville, Connecticut, United States | |
| Win | 5–3 | Daniel Carey | KO (punch) | Bellator 238 | January 25, 2020 | 2 | 0:15 | Inglewood, California, United States | |
| Loss | 4–3 | Ádám Borics | TKO (flying knee and punches) | Bellator 222 | June 14, 2019 | 2 | 3:55 | New York City, New York, United States | |
| Loss | 4–2 | Henry Corrales | KO (punches) | Bellator 214 | January 26, 2019 | 1 | 1:07 | Inglewood, California, United States | |
| Win | 4–1 | Leandro Higo | TKO (punches) | Bellator 206 | September 29, 2018 | 1 | 3:19 | San Jose, California, United States | |
| Win | 3–1 | Lee Morrison | TKO (punches) | Bellator 199 | May 12, 2018 | 1 | 1:10 | San Jose, California, United States | |
| Win | 2–1 | Shane Kruchten | KO (punch to the body) | Bellator 192 | January 20, 2018 | 1 | 0:37 | Inglewood, California, United States | |
| Win | 1–1 | Justin Linn | KO (punch) | Bellator 183 | September 24, 2017 | 1 | 3:45 | San Jose, California, United States | Featherweight debut. |
| Loss | 0–1 | Zach Freeman | Submission (guillotine choke) | Bellator 180 | June 24, 2017 | 1 | 0:24 | New York City, New York, United States | Lightweight debut. |

== Freestyle record ==
Senior Freestyle Matches
| Res. | Record | Opponent | Score | Date | Event | Location |
|---|---|---|---|---|---|---|
| Win | 41–14 | (United States) Lance Palmer | TF 12–1 | June 13, 2026 | RAF 10 | (United States) St. Louis, Missouri |
2016 US Olympic Team Trials (silver) at 65 kg
| Loss | 40–14 | (United States) Frank Molinaro | 4–4 | April 9–10, 2016 | 2016 US Olympic Team Trials | (United States) Iowa City, Iowa |
| Loss | 40–13 | (United States) Frank Molinaro | 3–4 | April 9–10, 2016 | 2016 US Olympic Team Trials | (United States) Iowa City, Iowa |
| Win | 40–12 | (United States) Frank Molinaro | 4–2 | April 9–10, 2016 | 2016 US Olympic Team Trials | (United States) Iowa City, Iowa |
| Win | 39–12 | (United States) Reece Humphrey | TF 12–1 | April 9–10, 2016 | 2016 US Olympic Team Trials | (United States) Iowa City, Iowa |
| Win | 38–12 | (United States) Jordan Oliver | 11–9 | April 9–10, 2016 | 2016 US Olympic Team Trials | (United States) Iowa City, Iowa |
| Win | 37–12 | (United States) Jayson Ness | TF 20–9 | April 9–10, 2016 | 2016 US Olympic Team Trials | (United States) Iowa City, Iowa |
2016 Alexander Medved Prizes (bronze) at 70 kg
| Win | 36–12 | (Georgia (country)) Davit Tlashadze | 10–5 | February 18–19, 2016 | 2016 Alexander Medved Prizes Ranking Series | Minsk, Belarus |
| Loss | 35–12 | (Georgia (country)) Zurabi Iakobishvili | 3–5 | February 18–19, 2016 | 2016 Alexander Medved Prizes Ranking Series | Minsk, Belarus |
| Win | 35–11 | (Belarus) Andrei Karpach | TF 12–0 | February 18–19, 2016 | 2016 Alexander Medved Prizes Ranking Series | Minsk, Belarus |
| Win | 34–11 | (Mongolia) Ganzorigiin Mandakhnaran | TF 11–0 | February 18–19, 2016 | 2016 Alexander Medved Prizes Ranking Series | Minsk, Belarus |
| Win | 33–11 | (Kazakhstan) Kanat Musabekov | TF 14–4 | February 18–19, 2016 | 2016 Alexander Medved Prizes Ranking Series | Minsk, Belarus |
2016 Outstanding Ukrainian Wrestlers and Coaches Memorial 5th at 70 kg
| Loss | 32–11 | (Armenia) Valter Margaryan | | February 13–14, 2016 | XXth Outstanding Ukrainian Wrestlers and Coaches Memorial | Kyiv, Ukraine |
| Loss | 32–10 | (Iran) Saeed Dadashpour | 3–7 | February 13–14, 2016 | XXth Outstanding Ukrainian Wrestlers and Coaches Memorial | Kyiv, Ukraine |
| Win | 32–9 | (United States) Nazar Kulchytskyy | 6–2 | February 13–14, 2016 | XXth Outstanding Ukrainian Wrestlers and Coaches Memorial | Kyiv, Ukraine |
2015 US Nationals 4th at 65 kg
| Loss | 31–9 | (United States) Reece Humphrey | TF 0–10 | December 17–19, 2015 | 2015 US Senior National Championships | (United States) Las Vegas, Nevada |
| Win | 31–8 | (United States) Frank Molinaro | 14–5 | December 17–19, 2015 | 2015 US Senior National Championships | (United States) Las Vegas, Nevada |
| Loss | 30–8 | (United States) Logan Stieber | 5–13 | December 17–19, 2015 | 2015 US Senior National Championships | (United States) Las Vegas, Nevada |
| Win | 30–7 | (United States) Kellen Russell | 10–3 | December 17–19, 2015 | 2015 US Senior National Championships | (United States) Las Vegas, Nevada |
| Win | 29–7 | (United States) Justin Feldman | TF 10–0 | December 17–19, 2015 | 2015 US Senior National Championships | (United States) Las Vegas, Nevada |
| Win | 28–7 | (United States) Nick Dardanes | 6–0 | December 17–19, 2015 | 2015 US Senior National Championships | (United States) Las Vegas, Nevada |
2015 Bill Farrell Open (bronze) at 65 kg
| Win | 27–7 | (United States) Frank Molinaro | 7–4 | November 5–7, 2015 | 2015 Bill Farrell International Open | (United States) New York City, New York |
| Win | 26–7 | (United States) Jason Chamberlain | 11–4 | November 5–7, 2015 | 2015 Bill Farrell International Open | (United States) New York City, New York |
| Win | 25–7 | (United States) Nazar Kulchytskyy | 8–2 | November 5–7, 2015 | 2015 Bill Farrell International Open | (United States) New York City, New York |
| Win | 24–7 | (United States) Kendric Maple | TF 11–0 | November 5–7, 2015 | 2015 Bill Farrell International Open | (United States) New York City, New York |
| Loss | 23–7 | (United States) Frank Molinaro | 2–4 | November 5–7, 2015 | 2015 Bill Farrell International Open | (United States) New York City, New York |
| Win | 23–6 | (Bulgaria) Filip Stefanov | TF 10–0 | November 5–7, 2015 | 2015 Bill Farrell International Open | (United States) New York City, New York |
| Win | 22–6 | (United States) Mario Mason | TF 10–0 | November 5–7, 2015 | 2015 Bill Farrell International Open | (United States) New York City, New York |
2015 Intercontinental Cup 5th at 70 kg
| Loss | 21–6 | (Russia) Azamat Omurzhanov | 4–4 | October 16–18, 2015 | 2015 Intercontinental Cup | Khasavyurt, Russia |
| Loss | 21–5 | (Russia) Amir Berukov | 8–12 | October 16–18, 2015 | 2015 Intercontinental Cup | Khasavyurt, Russia |
| Win | 21–4 | (Russia) Abutalim Gamzaev | 13–9 | October 16–18, 2015 | 2015 Intercontinental Cup | Khasavyurt, Russia |
| Win | 20–4 | (Russia) Magomed Khizriev | 11–9 | October 16–18, 2015 | 2015 Intercontinental Cup | Khasavyurt, Russia |
| Win | 19–4 | (Russia) Arsen Gusbanov | TF 11–0 | October 16–18, 2015 | 2015 Intercontinental Cup | Khasavyurt, Russia |
| Loss | 18–4 | (United States) Brent Metcalf | 3–5 | April 6, 2015 | 2015 Agon V | (United States) Cedar Rapids, Iowa |
2015 Granma y Cerro Pelado International (gold) at 65 kg
| Win | 18–3 | (United States) Reece Humphrey | 6–0 | February 11–15, 2015 | 2015 Granma y Cerro Pelado International | Havana, Cuba |
| Win | 17–3 | (Cuba) Alejandro Valdés | 5–2 | February 11–15, 2015 | 2015 Granma y Cerro Pelado International | Havana, Cuba |
| Win | 16–3 | (Cuba) Franklin Maren | 1–1 | February 11–15, 2015 | 2015 Granma y Cerro Pelado International | Havana, Cuba |
| Win | 15–3 | (Brazil) Matheus Frota | TF 10–0 | February 11–15, 2015 | 2015 Granma y Cerro Pelado International | Havana, Cuba |
2015 Ivan Yarygin Golden Grand Prix 21st at 65 kg
| Loss | 14–3 | (Chechnya) Akhmed Chakaev | 3–6 | January 22–26, 2015 | Golden Grand Prix Ivan Yarygin 2015 | Krasnoyarsk, Russia |
2014 Henri Deglane Grand Prix (gold) at 65 kg
| Win | 14–2 | (Armenia) Devid Safaryan | 7–5 | November 28–29, 2014 | 2014 Henri Deglane Challenge | Nice, France |
| Win | 13–2 | (Georgia (country)) Davit Berdznishvili | 10–5 | November 28–29, 2014 | 2014 Henri Deglane Challenge | Nice, France |
| Win | 11–2 | (France) Maxime Fiquet | TF 12–0 | November 28–29, 2014 | 2014 Henri Deglane Challenge | Nice, France |
| Win | 10–2 | (France) Ruslan Mukhtarov | TF 14–4 | November 28–29, 2014 | 2014 Henri Deglane Challenge | Nice, France |
| Win | 9–2 | (France) Bruno Lawson | TF 11–0 | November 28–29, 2014 | 2014 Henri Deglane Challenge | Nice, France |
2014 Soslan Andiev International (bronze) at 70 kg
| Win | 8–2 | (Kabardino-Balkaria) | TF | October 24, 2014 | 2014 Soslan Andiev International | Vladikavkaz, Russia |
| Win | 7–2 | (Chechnya) | TF | October 24, 2014 | 2014 Soslan Andiev International | Vladikavkaz, Russia |
| Win | 6–2 | (Dagestan) | TF | October 24, 2014 | 2014 Soslan Andiev International | Vladikavkaz, Russia |
| Loss | 5–2 | (Dagestan) Magomed Khizriev | | October 24, 2014 | 2014 Soslan Andiev International | Vladikavkaz, Russia |
| Win | 5–1 | (North Ossetia–Alania) | TF | October 24, 2014 | 2014 Soslan Andiev International | Vladikavkaz, Russia |
2014 Spain Grand Prix (silver) at 65 kg
| Loss | 4–1 | (Italy) Frank Chamizo | 2–4 | July 5, 2014 | 2014 Grand Prix of Spain | Madrid, Spain |
| Win | 4–0 | (South Korea) Lee Seung-bong | TF 10–0 | July 5, 2014 | 2014 Grand Prix of Spain | Madrid, Spain |
| Win | 3–0 | (Iran) Abdollahpour Gholamreza | 9–1 | July 5, 2014 | 2014 Grand Prix of Spain | Madrid, Spain |
| Win | 2–0 | (Republic of the Congo) Rodrigue Lawson Massamba | TF 11–0 | July 5, 2014 | 2014 Grand Prix of Spain | Madrid, Spain |
| Win | 1–0 | (Russia) Alibeggadzhi Emeev | 8–0 | November 16, 2013 | 2013 USA vs. Russia Dual Meet I | (United States) Clifton Park, New York |

== See also ==
- List of current UFC fighters
- List of male mixed martial artists
