= Bellator 257 =

Bellator mixed martial arts event in 2021

Bellator 257: Nemkov vs. Davis 2
- The poster for Bellator 257: Nemkov vs. Davis 2
- Promotion: Bellator MMA
- Date: April 16, 2021
- Venue: Mohegan Sun Arena
- City: Uncasville, Connecticut, United States

Event chronology
Bellator 256: Bader vs. Machida 2	Bellator 257: Nemkov vs. Davis 2	Bellator 258: Archuleta vs. Pettis

Bellator 257: Nemkov vs. Davis 2 was a mixed martial arts event produced by Bellator MMA that took place on April 16, 2021 at Mohegan Sun Arena in Uncasville, Connecticut.

== Background ==
The event was headlined by two of the Quarterfinals of the Bellator Light Heavyweight World Grand Prix Tournament. The main event featured current Bellator Light Heavyweight World Champion Vadim Nemkov making his first title defense against Phil Davis, a rematch of their November 2018 bout, which saw Nemkov win via split decision. The co-main event was to feature former UFC Middleweight Title contender Yoel Romero facing off against former UFC Light-Heavyweight Title contender Anthony Johnson in their debuts for the promotion. However, on March 26, it was announced that the bout was moved to Bellator 258, with Corey Anderson vs. Dovletdzhan Yagshimuradov being moved from Bellator 256 to serve as the co-main for this event.

Aaron Pico was expected to face Aiden Lee at this event. However, on April 4, Pico had to pull out of the bout due to medical issues. The fight is planned to be rebooked at a later date.

A women's flyweight bout between Veta Arteaga and Desiree Yanez, which was originally scheduled for Bellator 250 in October, was rescheduled for this event.

A catchweight contest at 175 pounds between Paul Daley and Sabah Homasi served as the opening fight of the main card.

At the weigh-ins, Jay Jay Wilson missed weight by .75 pounds and was fined a percentage of his purse.

== Results ==
Main Card (Showtime)
Weight class				Method	Round	Time	Notes
Light Heavyweight	Vadim Nemkov (c)	def.	Phil Davis	Decision (unanimous) (48–47, 48–47, 48–47)	5	5:00	(Note: Bellator Light Heavyweight World Grand Prix Tournament Quarter-Final bout for the Bellator Light Heavyweight World Championship)
Light Heavyweight	Corey Anderson	def.	Dovletdzhan Yagshimuradov	TKO (elbows and punches)	3	2:15	(Note: Bellator Light Heavyweight World Grand Prix Tournament Quarter-Final bout.)
Women's Flyweight	Veta Arteaga	def.	Desiree Yanez	Decision (majority) (28–28, 29–27, 29–27)	3	5:00	(Note: Arteaga was deducted a point in Round 2 due to knees to a downed Yanez.)
Catchweight (175 lb)	Paul Daley	def.	Sabah Homasi	TKO (punches)	2	1:44
Preliminary card (Youtube/Pluto TV)
Women's Featherweight	Julia Budd	def.	Dayana Silva	Decision (split) (28–29, 29–28, 29–28)	3	5:00
Light Heavyweight	Julius Anglickas	def.	Gregory Milliard	Decision (unanimous) (29–28, 30–27, 30–27)	3	5:00
Heavyweight	Steve Mowry	def.	Shaun Asher	TKO (knee and punches)	1	0:55
Welterweight	Grachik Bozinyan	def.	Demarques Jackson	Decision (unanimous) (30–27, 29–28, 29–28)	3	5:00
Welterweight	Raymond Daniels	def.	Peter Stanonik	Decision (unanimous) (30–26, 30–27, 30–26)	3	5:00
Lightweight	Lance Gibson Jr.	def.	Marcus Surin	Decision (unanimous) (29–28, 30–27, 30–27)	3	5:00
Light Heavyweight	Karl Albrektsson	def.	Viktor Nemkov	Decision (unanimous) (29–28, 30–27, 30–27)	3	5:00
Featherweight	Mads Burnell	def.	Saul Rogers	Submission (rear-naked choke)	2	4:08
Catchweight (146.75 lb)	Jay-Jay Wilson	def.	Pedro Carvalho	TKO (punches)	2	0:53	(Note: Wilson missed weight and was fined 20% of his purse.)

== See also ==
- 2021 in Bellator MMA
- List of Bellator MMA events
- List of current Bellator fighters
