= Bellator 266 =

Mixed martial arts event in 2021

Bellator 266: Davis vs. Romero
- The poster for Bellator 266: Davis vs. Romero
- Promotion: Bellator MMA
- Date: September 18, 2021
- Venue: SAP Center
- City: San Jose, California, United States

Event chronology
Bellator 265: Kongo vs. Kharitonov	Bellator 266: Davis vs. Romero	Bellator 267: Lima vs. MVP 2

Bellator 266: Davis vs. Romero was a mixed martial arts event produced by Bellator MMA that took place on September 18, 2021, at the SAP Center in San Jose, California, United States.

== Background ==
Former UFC middleweight title contender Yoel Romero made his Bellator debut against Phil Davis, another former UFC contender, at this event. Romero, 44, was slated to debut for the promotion in the first round of their light heavyweight tournament against Anthony Johnson in May, but was forced to withdraw due to a medical issue concerning his eye.

The co-main event featured a bout between #4 ranked Welterweight Neiman Gracie and Mark Lemminger.

A women's flyweight bout between Alejandra Lara and DeAnna Bennett was scheduled for Bellator 263. The bout was rescheduled for unknown reasons to take place at Bellator 265. On August 13, it was announced that the bout was moved once again, this time to this event.

A lightweight bout between Adam Piccolotti and Saul Rogers was scheduled for this event. However, Piccolotti pulled out of the bout for unknown reasons and was replaced by Georgi Karakhanyan.

Bantamweight bouts between Socrates Hernandez and Pedro Juarez and Erik Gunha versus Bobby Soronio III were scheduled for the event; however Juarez and Gunha pulled out their respective bouts so Hernandez and Soronio III instead faced each other.

Eddie Abasolo was scheduled to face Art Hernandez in a 160 pounds catchweight bout, but Hernandez did not make weight. Therefore, Abasolo did not weigh in and the bout was scrapped.

At the weigh-ins, DeAnna Bennett missed weight for her bout. Bennett weighed in at 129.2 pounds, 3.2 pounds over the flyweight non-title fight limit. The bout proceeded at catchweight and Bennett was fined a percentage of her purse which went to her opponent Alejandra Lara.

== Results ==
Main Card (Showtime)
Weight class				Method	Round	Time	Notes
Light Heavyweight	Phil Davis	def.	Yoel Romero	Decision (split) (30–27, 28–29, 30–26)	3	5:00
Welterweight	Neiman Gracie	def.	Mark Lemminger	TKO (elbows and punches)	1	1:27
Catchweight (129.2 lb)	DeAnna Bennett	def.	Alejandra Lara	Decision (unanimous) (30–27, 30–26, 30–26)	3	5:00	(Note: Bennett missed weight and was fined a percentage of her purse.)
Lightweight	Saul Rogers	def.	Georgi Karakhanyan	Decision (unanimous) (30–27, 30–26, 30–26)	3	5:00
Light Heavyweight	Ben Parrish	def.	Christian Edwards	KO (punches)	1	0:38
Preliminary card (Youtube/Pluto TV)
Light Heavyweight	Alex Polizzi	def.	Grant Neal	Decision (split) (29–28, 28–29, 29–28)	3	5:00
Middleweight	Anthony Adams	def.	Khalid Murtazaliev	Decision (unanimous) (29–28, 29–28, 29–28)	3	5:00
Bantamweight	Bobby Seronio III	def.	Socrates Hernandez	Decision (unanimous) (29–27, 29–26, 29–26)	3	5:00
Catchweight (175 lb)	Abraham Vaesau	def.	Albert Gonzales	KO (punches)	1	2:17
Welterweight	Shane Keefe	def.	Rhalan Gracie	Decision (unanimous) (29–28, 29–28, 29–28)	3	5:00
Flyweight	Edwin De Los Santos	def.	Jon Adams	TKO (body kick and punches)	1	3:29
Catchweight (130 lb)	Jesse Delgado	def.	Joshua Dillon	Decision (unanimous) (30–27, 30–27, 30–27)	3	5:00

== Reported payout ==
The following is the reported payout to the fighters as reported to the California State Athletic Commission. The amounts do not include sponsor money, discretionary bonuses, viewership points, or additional earnings. The total disclosed payout for the event was $778,800.

MAIN CARD (10 p.m. E.T., Showtime)

- Phil Davis: $100,000 def. Yoel Romero: $150,000
- Neiman Gracie: $100,000 def. Mark Lemminger: $40,000
- DeAnna Bennett: $38,600 (includes $17,000 win bonus, $5,400 deduction) def. Alejandra Lara: $27,700 ($2,700 from Bennett)
- Saul Rogers: $80,000 (includes $40,000 win bonus) def. Georgi Karakhanyan: $35,000
- Ben Parrish: $20,000 (includes $10,000 win bonus) def. Christian Edwards: $30,000

PRELIMS (7 p.m. E.T., YouTube/PlutoTV)

- Alex Polizzi: $36,000 (includes $18,000 win bonus) def. Grant Neal: $16,000
- Anthony Adams: $40,000 (includes $20,000 win bonus) def. Khalid Murtazaliev: $33,000
- Robert Seronio III: $3,000 (includes $1,500 win bonus) def. Socrates Hernandez: $2,000
- Abraham Vaesau: $6,000 (includes $3,000 win bonus) def. Albert Gonzales: $3,000
- Shane Keefe: $3,000 (includes $1,500 win bonus) def. Rhalan Gracie: $5,000
- Edwin De Los Santos: $3,000 (includes $1,500 win bonus) def. Jonathan Adams: $1,500
- Jesse Delgado: $4,000 (includes $2,000 win bonus) def. Joshua Dillon: $2,000

== See also ==
- 2021 in Bellator MMA
- List of Bellator MMA events
- List of current Bellator fighters
