= Bellator 290 =

Bellator mixed martial arts event in 2023

Bellator 290: Bader vs. Fedor 2
- The poster for Bellator 290: Bader vs. Fedor 2
- Promotion: Bellator MMA
- Date: February 4, 2023
- Venue: Kia Forum
- City: Inglewood, California, United States

Event chronology
Bellator MMA vs. Rizin FF	Bellator 290: Bader vs. Fedor 2	Bellator 291: Amosov vs. Storley 2

Bellator 290: Bader vs. Fedor 2 was a mixed martial arts event produced by Bellator MMA that took place on February 4, 2023, at the Kia Forum in Inglewood, California, United States. The card aired live on CBS and Paramount Plus, the first time the promotion has aired live on the network and the first time MMA has been broadcast live on CBS since 2010.

== Background ==
The event marked the promotion's seventh visit to Inglewood and first since Bellator 263 in July 2021.

The main event of the Bellator 290 featured MMA veteran and former PRIDE Heavyweight Champion Fedor Emelianenko's last fight before his retirement. Emelianenko challenged Bellator Heavyweight champion Ryan Bader (also former Bellator Light Heavyweight Champion and The Ultimate Fighter: Team Nogueira vs. Team Mir light heavyweight winner) for the title. The fight, which was the first event of 2023 for the promotion, was a rematch of their January 2019 encounter in which Bader defeated his opponent by TKO in the first round to win the Bellator Heavyweight World Championship.

The event was shown live on CBS and Paramount Plus, marking the first time the promotion has done so and the first time MMA has been broadcast live on the network since 2010.

A Bellator Light Heavyweight World Championship bout between current champion Vadim Nemkov (also the Bellator Light Heavyweight World Grand Prix Champion) and former UFC Middleweight title contender Yoel Romero was expected to take place at the event. However, Nemkov withdrew for undisclosed reasons and the bout was cancelled.

A Bellator Middleweight World Championship bout between current champion Johnny Eblen and Anatoly Tokov served as the new co-main event.

Neiman Gracie and Michael Lombardo were scheduled to face each other at this event. However, two weeks before the event, Lombardo was forced to withdraw from the bout and he was replaced by Dante Schiro.

At the weigh-ins, Diana Avsaragova missed weight for her bout, coming in at 128.8 pounds, 2.8 pounds over the flyweight non-title fight limit. The bout proceeded at catchweight and Avsaragova was fined 25% of her purse which went to Alejandra Lara.

== Results ==
Main Card (CBS/Paramount+)
Weight class				Method	Round	Time	Notes
Heavyweight	Ryan Bader (c)	def.	Fedor Emelianenko	TKO (punches)	1	2:30	(Note: For the Bellator Heavyweight World Championship.)
Middleweight	Johnny Eblen (c)	def.	Anatoly Tokov	Decision (unanimous) (50–45, 49–46, 49–46)	5	5:00	(Note: For the Bellator Middleweight World Championship.)
Welterweight	Brennan Ward	def.	Sabah Homasi	TKO (head kick and punches)	2	1:34
Preliminary card (Youtube/Pluto TV)
Welterweight	Lorenz Larkin	def.	Mukhamed Berkhamov	KO (elbow)	1	1:41
Featherweight	Henry Corrales	def.	Akhmed Magomedov	Decision (unanimous) (29–28, 29–28, 29–28)	3	5:00
Heavyweight	Ali Isaev	vs.	Steve Mowry	Draw (unanimous) (28–28, 28–28, 28–28)	3	5:00
Lightweight	Chris Gonzalez	def.	Max Rohskopf	TKO (punches)	2	1:22
Light Heavyweight	Grant Neal	def.	Karl Albrektsson	Decision (split) (28–29, 29–28, 29–28)	3	5:00
Catchweight (128.8 lb)	Diana Avsaragova	def.	Alejandra Lara	Decision (split) (29–28, 28–29, 29–28)	3	5:00	(Note: Originally a flyweight bout; Avsaragova missed weight)
Bantamweight	Nikita Mikhailov	def.	Darrion Caldwell	Decision (unanimous) (29–28, 29–28, 29–28)	3	5:00
Postliminary card (Youtube)
Welterweight	Yusuf Karakaya	def.	Ethan Hughes	Decision (unanimous) (29–28, 29–28, 29–28)	3	5:00
Featherweight	Isaiah Hokit	def.	Peter Ishiguro	Decision (unanimous) (30–27, 30–27, 30–27)	3	5:00
Bantamweight	Jaylon Bates	def.	Jornel Lugo	Decision (split) (28–29, 29–28, 29–28)	3	5:00
Welterweight	Neiman Gracie	def.	Dante Schiro	Decision (unanimous) (30–27, 30–27, 30–27)	3	5:00

== Reported payout ==
The following is the reported payout to the fighters as reported to the California State Athletic Commission. The amounts do not include sponsor money, discretionary bonuses, viewership points, or additional earnings.

- Ryan Bader: $150,000 (no win bonus) def. Fedor Emelianenko: $100,000
- Johnny Eblen: $150,000 (no win bonus) def. Anatoly Tokov: $75,000
- Brennan Ward: $75,000 (no win bonus) def. Sabah Homasi: $100,000
- Lorenz Larkin: $75,000 (no win bonus) def. Mukhamed Berkhamov: $33,000
- Henry Corrales: $75,000 (no win bonus) def. Akhmed Magomedov: $28,000
- Steve Mowry: $70,000 draw Ali Isaev: $70,000
- Chris Gonzalez: $100,000 (includes $50,000 win bonus) def. Max Rohskopf: $30,000
- Grant Neal: $66,000 (includes $33,000 win bonus) def. Karl Albrektsson: $35,000
- Diana Avsaragova: $32,000 (includes $16,000 win bonus) def. Alejandra Lara: $60,000
- Nikita Mikhailov: $32,000 (includes $16,000 win bonus) def. Darrion Caldwell: $50,000
- Neiman Gracie: $75,000 (no win bonus) def. Dante Schiro: $20,000
- Jaylon Bates: $20,000 (no win bonus) def. Jornel Lugo: $35,000
- Isaiah Hokit: $14,000 (includes $7,000 win bonus) def. Peter Ishiguro: $3,000
- Yusuf Karakaya: $6,000 (includes $3,000 win bonus) def. Ethan Hughes: $5,000

== Viewership ==
After the event, it was announced that the event averaged 1.068 million viewers on CBS.

== See also ==
- 2023 in Bellator MMA
- List of Bellator MMA events
- List of current Bellator fighters
