= Alejandra Lara =

Colombian mixed martial arts fighter

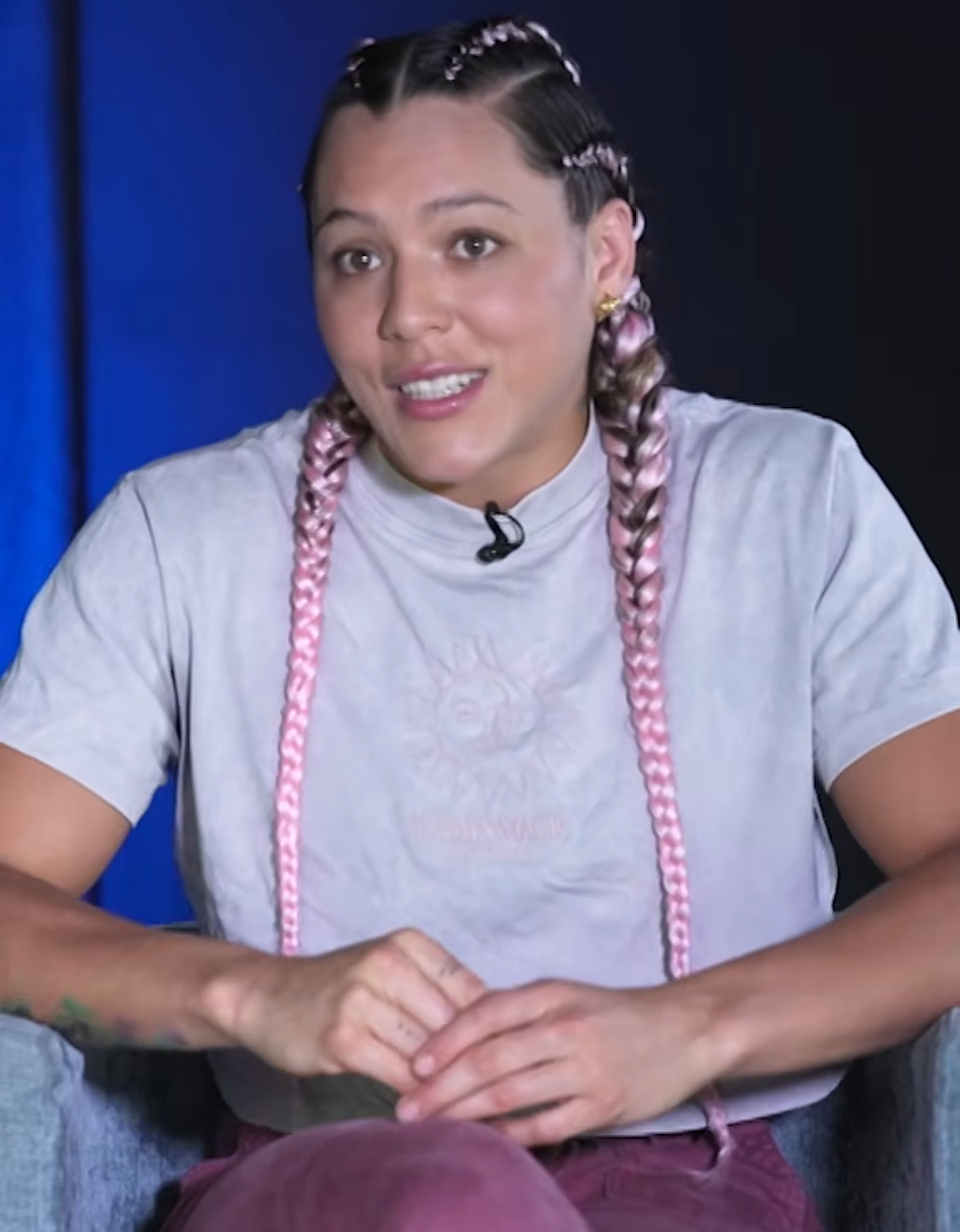
- Born: 4 August 1994 (age 32); Medellín, Colombia
- Other names: Azul
- Height: 5 ft 7 in (1.70 m)
- Weight: 125 lb (57 kg; 8.9 st)
- Division: Flyweight
- Reach: 69 in (175 cm)
- Fighting out of: Medellín, Colombia
- Team: Combat Training Club
- Years active: 2008–present

Mixed martial arts record
- Total: 22
- Wins: 12
- By knockout: 6
- By submission: 3
- By decision: 3
- Losses: 10
- By knockout: 1
- By submission: 2
- By decision: 7

Other information
- Mixed martial arts record from Sherdog

Alejandra Lara (born 4 August 1994) is a Colombian mixed martial artist who competes in the Flyweight division. She had previously most notably competed in Bellator MMA, where she was a title contender. She is also known by the nickname "Azul" (which translates to "Azure" from Spanish).

== Early Life and Background ==
Alejandra Lara was born on 4 August 1994, in Medellín, Colombia. During her childhood, she was diagnosed with "Attention Deficit Hyperactivity Disorder (ADHD)," which influenced her early involvement in a wide range of extracurricular activities.

Lara engaged in several artistic and physical disciplines, including:

Performing Arts: Singing and theater.

Movement & Wellness: Yoga and various forms of dance, including pole dancing.

Athletics: Swimming, scuba diving, and roller skating.

Lara's transition into combat sports began when she started training in karate and wushu-sanda. These disciplines eventually led her to pursue a professional career in mixed martial arts.

== Mixed martial arts career ==
=== Early career ===
Lara made her MMA debut on 10 December 2011 on Extreme Combat MMA Senshi Ki 1 against Monica Leon, winning the fight in round one via retirement. Before joining Bellator MMA, she amassed a record of 6 wins against 1 loss.

=== Bellator MMA ===
Lara debuted at Bellator 190 on 9 December 2017. She defeated Lena Ovchynnikova via a rear-naked choke submission in the third round. Bellator announced in February 2018 that they extended her contract with the promotion.

In her second fight for the promotion, Lara faced Ilima-Lei Macfarlane at Bellator 201 in June 2018 for the Bellator Women's Flyweight World Championship. She lost the fight via an armbar submission in the third round.

In her third fight for the promotion, Lara faced undefeated Brazilian prospect Juliana Velasquez at Bellator 212 on 14 December 2018. She lost the fight via split decision.

Lara next fought Taylor Turner at Bellator 225 on 24 August 2019. She won the fight by TKO in the first round. Ahead of the fight, she used her appearance at the ceremonial weigh-in to draw attention to the plight of the Amazon's rain forests.

Lara then faced Veta Arteaga at Bellator 235 on 20 December 2019. She won the fight via unanimous decision and subsequently signed a new, six-fight contract with the promotion.

Lara faced undefeated Rizin standout Kana Watanabe on 2 April 2021, at Bellator 255. She lost the bout via split decision.

Lara was expected to face DeAnna Bennett on 31 July 2021, at Bellator 263. The bout was rescheduled for unknown reasons to take place on 20 August 2021, at Bellator 265. On 13 August, it was announced that the bout was moved once again, this time to Bellator 266. At the weigh-ins, DeAnna Bennett missed weight for her bout. Bennett weighed in at 129.2 pounds, 3.2 pounds over the flyweight non-title fight limit. The bout proceeded at catchweight and Bennett was fined a percentage of her purse which went to Lara. Lara lost the bout in dominant fashion via unanimous decision.

Lara faced Ilara Joanne at Bellator 282 on 24 June 2022. She lost the bout via unanimous decision.

Lara faced Diana Avsaragova on 4 February 2023, at Bellator 290. At the weigh-ins, Avsaragova missed weight for her bout, coming in at 128.8 pounds, 2.8 pounds over the flyweight non-title fight limit. The bout proceeded at catchweight and Avsaragova was fined 25% of her purse which went to Lara. Lara lost the close bout via split decision. 5 out of 7 media scores gave it to Lara.

On 23 January 2024, it was announced that she was released from the promotion.

=== Combate Global and Budo SC ===
In her first bout after leaving Bellator, Lara faced Gisele Luna in the main event of Combate Global: Lara vs. Luna on 11 May 2024, winning the bout via ground and pound TKO in the first round, bloodying her opponent in the process.

In 2024, Lara joined the Mexican promotion Budo Sento Championship, where she was scheduled to face Silvana Gómez Juárez for the vacant Women's Flyweight Championship on 2 August at BSC 24. She won the fight by unanimous decision and became the new Women's Flyweight Champion.

=== Posterior fights ===
Lara was scheduled to face Aspen Ladd in the inaugural Global Fight League event on 24 May 2025, at GFL 1. However, all GFL events were cancelled indefinitely.

After the GFL event was cancelled, Lara was booked for a title bout in Sweden. She faced Spain's Aitana Alvarez for the vacant bantamweight title in the co-main event of Superior Challenge 28, taking place on 31 May in Stockholm, Sweden. She lost in the first round due to an arm injury.

== Championships and accomplishments ==
- Budo Sento Championship
  - BSC Women's Flyweight Championship (One time, current)

== Mixed martial arts record ==
Professional record breakdown
22 matches	12 wins	10 losses
By knockout	6	1
By submission	3	2
By decision	3	7

Res.	Record	Opponent	Method	Event	Date	Round	Time	Location	Notes
Loss	12–10	Jaeleen Robledo	Submission (guillotine choke)	Tuff-N-Uff 153	24 April 2026	3	3:43	Las Vegas, Nevada, United States	For the Tuff-N-Uff Women's Bantamweight Championship.
Win	12–9	Helena Simas	TKO (punches)	Empire MMA 14	14 March 2026	3	1:55	Medellín, Colombia	
Loss	11–9	Aitana Álvarez	TKO (arm injury)	Superior Challenge 28	31 May 2025	1	2:49	Stockholm, Sweden	For the vacant SC Women's Bantamweight Championship.
Loss	11–8	Paula Cristina	Decision (split)	Invicta FC 59	13 December 2024	3	5:00	Atlanta, Georgia, United States	Catchweight (130 lb) bout; Cristina missed weight (132.2 lb).
Win	11–7	Silvana Gómez Juárez	Decision (unanimous)	Budo Sento Championship 24	2 August 2024	5	5:00	Mexico City, Mexico	Won the vacant BSC Women's Flyweight Championship.
Win	10–7	Gisela Luna	TKO (elbows and punches)	Combate Global: Lara vs. Luna	11 May 2024	1	1:39	Miami, Florida, United States	
Loss	9–7	Diana Avsaragova	Decision (split)	Bellator 290	4 February 2023	3	5:00	Inglewood, California, United States	Catchweight (128.8 lb) bout; Avsaragova missed weight.
Loss	9–6	Ilara Joanne	Decision (unanimous)	Bellator 282	24 June 2022	3	5:00	Uncasville, Connecticut, United States	Lara was deducted one point in round 2 due to illegal upkick.
Loss	9–5	DeAnna Bennett	Decision (unanimous)	Bellator 266	18 September 2021	3	5:00	San Jose, California, United States	Catchweight (129.2 lb) bout; Bennett missed weight.
Loss	9–4	Kana Watanabe	Decision (split)	Bellator 255	2 April 2021	3	5:00	Uncasville, Connecticut, United States	
Win	9–3	Veta Arteaga	Decision (unanimous)	Bellator 235	20 December 2019	3	5:00	Honolulu, Hawaii, United States	Catchweight (126.8 lb) bout; Lara missed weight.
Win	8–3	Taylor Turner	TKO (punches)	Bellator 225	24 August 2019	1	3:44	Bridgeport, Connecticut, United States	Bantamweight bout.
Loss	7–3	Juliana Velasquez	Decision (split)	Bellator 212	14 December 2018	3	5:00	Honolulu, Hawaii, United States	
Loss	7–2	Ilima-Lei Macfarlane	Submission (armbar)	Bellator 201	29 June 2018	3	3:55	Temecula, California, United States	For the Bellator Women's Flyweight World Championship.
Win	7–1	Lena Ovchynnikova	Submission (rear-naked choke)	Bellator 190	9 December 2017	3	4:09	Florence, Italy	
Win	6–1	Lina Franco Rodriguez	Submission (rear-naked choke)	Empire Sports Marketing Colombia vs The World	13 February 2016	2	2:32	Bogotá, Colombia	
Win	5–1	Janeth Alvarado	TKO (retirement)	Cage Fight Nights MMA League 6	5 September 2015	1	5:00	Zapopan, Jalisco, Mexico	Won CFN Flyweight Championship.
Loss	4–1	Sabina Mazo	Decision (unanimous)	Striker Fighting Championship 18	26 March 2015	3	5:00	Barranquilla, Atlantico, Colombia	
Win	4–0	Paola Calderon	Technical Submission (armbar)	Striker Fighting Championship 12	13 November 2013	1	0:35	Bogotá, Colombia	
Win	3–0	Paola Calderon	Decision (unanimous)	Striker Fighting Championship 9	26 July 2013	3	5:00	Bogotá, Colombia	
Win	2–0	Maria Aguero	TKO (punches)	Professional Fight Club	29 September 2012	1	1:03	Envigado, Antioquia, Colombia	
Win	1–0	Monica Leon	TKO (retirement)	Extreme Combat MMA Senshi Ki	10 December 2011	1	2:22	Rionegro, Antioquia, Colombia	
