= Bellator 265 =

Bellator mixed martial arts event in 2021

Bellator 265: Kongo vs. Kharitonov
- The poster for Bellator 265: Kongo vs. Kharitonov
- Promotion: Bellator MMA
- Date: August 20, 2021
- Venue: Sanford Pentagon
- City: Sioux Falls, South Dakota, United States

Event chronology
Bellator 264: Mousasi vs. Salter	Bellator 265: Kongo vs. Kharitonov	Bellator 266: Davis vs. Romero

Bellator 265: Kongo vs. Kharitonov was a mixed martial arts event produced by Bellator MMA that took place on August 20, 2021 at the Sanford Pentagon in Sioux Falls, South Dakota, United States.

== Background ==
A heavyweight bout between #3 ranked Cheick Kongo and Sergei Kharitonov served as the main event.

A featherweight bout between #3 ranked Ádám Borics and #4 ranked Jay Jay Wilson was scheduled for this event. The bout was to determine the #1 contender who would face champion A. J. McKee. However, at the weigh-ins, Wilson came in at 150.4 pounds, missing weight by 4.4 pounds. As a result, the fight has been scrapped and Borics was paid his show money.

Number 5 ranked Welterweight Logan Storley made a return to his home state against Dante Schiro.

A women's flyweight bout between Alejandra Lara and DeAnna Bennett was scheduled for Bellator 263. The bout was rescheduled for unknown reasons to take place at this event. On August 13, it was announced that the bout was moved once again, this time to Bellator 266.

A lightweight bout between Mike Hamel and Bryce Logan took place on the preliminary portion of the bout.

Two heavyweight prospects, Bailey Schoenfelder and Kevin Childs, were scheduled to compete in the event prelims. However, the bout did not happen after Childs withdrew from the contest. With Childs being scrapped from his bout, a contracted catchweight bout at 225 pounds was set between Bailey Schoenfelder and Kory Moegenburg.

A heavyweight bout between #6 ranked Steve Mowry and Marcelo Golm was scheduled for Bellator 264, however on August 4 it was announced that Steve Mowry was scratched from the bout, with Golm facing Kelvin Tiller at this event. The week of the event, Tiller pulled out of the bout and he was replaced by promotional newcomer Billy Swanson.

A middleweight bout between Jeff Nielsen and Kory Moegenburg was cancelled the week off the event due to COVID-19 protocols.

== Results ==
Main Card (Showtime)
Weight class				Method	Round	Time	Notes
Heavyweight	Cheick Kongo	def.	Sergei Kharitonov	Submission (rear-naked choke)	2	4:59
Welterweight	Logan Storley	def.	Dante Schiro	Decision (split) (29-28, 28-29, 29-28)	3	5:00
Heavyweight	Marcelo Golm	def.	Billy Swanson	TKO (knee and punches)	1	4:57
Catchweight (140 lb)	Jornel Lugo	def.	Keith Lee	Technical Submission (rear-naked choke)	1	5:00
Preliminary card (Youtube/Pluto TV)
Middleweight	Fabio Aguiar	def.	Taylor Johnson	Decision (split) (28-29, 29-28, 29-28)	3	5:00
Lightweight	Mike Hamel	def.	Bryce Logan	Decision (unanimous) (30-27, 29-28, 29-28)	3	5:00
Welterweight	Archie Colgan	def.	Ben Simons	TKO (punches and elbows)	1	4:04
Middleweight	Duane Johnson	def.	Deven Fisher	Submission (brabo choke)	1	1:04
Catchweight (225 lb)	Bailey Schoenfelder	def.	Kory Moegenburg	TKO (elbows and punches)	1	4:11

== See also ==
- 2021 in Bellator MMA
- List of Bellator MMA events
- List of current Bellator fighters
