= Georgi Karakhanyan =

Russian mixed martial artist

- Born: May 29, 1985 (age 41); Moscow, Russian SFSR, Soviet Union
- Other names: Gogo; Insane
- Nationality: Armenian; American
- Height: 5 ft 8 in (1.73 m)
- Weight: 155 lb (70 kg; 11.1 st)
- Division: Featherweight; Lightweight
- Reach: 67.5 in (171 cm)
- Stance: Orthodox
- Fighting out of: Riverside, California, United States
- Team: Treigning LAB Gym; GFC; S.K. Golden Boys Wrestling
- Trainer: Head Trainer: Sam Calavitta, Saad Awad, Arnold Jimenez
- Rank: Black belt in Brazilian Jiu-Jitsu under Romie Aram and Marcelo Mafra
- Years active: 2006–2022

Professional boxing record
- Total: 1
- Wins: 1

Mixed martial arts record
- Total: 47
- Wins: 31
- By knockout: 7
- By submission: 16
- By decision: 8
- Losses: 14
- By knockout: 3
- By decision: 11
- Draws: 1
- No contests: 1

Other information
- Boxing record from BoxRec
- Mixed martial arts record from Sherdog

Georgi Karakhanyan (born May 29, 1985) is a Russian-born Armenian-American former professional mixed martial artist and professional boxer who competed in the Lightweight division. A professional competitor since 2006, Karakhanyan has competed for the Bellator MMA, Absolute Championship Berkut, World Series of Fighting, DREAM, Tachi Palace Fights, and King of the Cage. Karakhanyan is also the former WSOF Featherweight Champion.

== Background ==
Georgi was born in Moscow to Armenian parents and raised in Moscow, Russia. He was introduced to martial arts by his father at the age of six (Georgi’s father has a black belt third dan in Shotokan Karate and he’s also a Sambo expert). Georgi was just eight years old when he first fought in a full contact martial arts competition. He began training in martial arts at a young age, but found his true love in soccer.

== Soccer ==
He played in clubs Torpedo Moscow and Spartak Moscow.

== Mixed martial arts career ==
=== Early career ===
After his soccer career, he began his MMA career while living and training at United Brazilian jiu-jitsu with Instructor, Rommel Dunbar in Riverside, California. Georgi made his first professional MMA debut on October 13, 2006, just after six months of training in Brazilian jiu-jitsu. Although Karakhanyan never dreamt about cage fighting, winning his very first fight against a veteran MMA fighter in the KOTC, gave him enormous confidence and belief that he is on the right path which fueled his desire to give MMA all he had. He joined Bellator to take part in their Season Two Featherweight Tournament and Season Four Featherweight Tournament. On December 2, 2011, Karakhanyan won the Tachi Palace Fights Featherweight Championship.

=== Bellator ===
In 2009, Georgi signed with Bellator and was part of the eight-man Featherweight Tournament of Bellator Fighting Championships: Season Two in 2010. In the first round, he took on the veteran fighter Bao Quach at Bellator 13. Karakhanyan won the fight via knockout (knee) at 4:05 of the first round, knocking Quach unconscious. In the semifinals, Georgi faced highly acclimated wrestler and World Greco-Roman Wrestling Champion Joe Warren (Ranked #8 Featherweight in the world) at Bellator 18 and lost the fight via unanimous decision. Joe Warren ended up winning the tournament and became the Bellator Featherweight Champion.

In 2011, Georgi returned for Bellator Fighting Championships: Season Four and faced Patrício Pitbull (Ranked #9 Featherweight in the world) in the first round. Karakhanyan lost via TKO (punches) in the third round. Patricio would also end up winning the tournament.

=== Tachi Palace Fights ===
On December 2, 2011, at TPF 11: Redemption, Karakhanyan made his Tachi Palace Fights debut against former Tachi Palace Fights Featherweight Champion Isaac DeJesus for the vacant Tachi Palace Fights Featherweight Championship. De Jesus had never lost his title in a bout; he was stripped of it when he failed to make weight. Karakhanyan defeated De Jesus via triangle choke at 4:02 in the first round to become the new Tachi Palace Fights Featherweight Champion.

Karakhanyan was scheduled to fight The Ultimate Fighter 14 participant Micah Miller on March 9, 2012, at TPF 12: Second Coming in the first defense of his title, but the fight was later canceled due to an illness from Karakhanyan. The bout was moved back to September 7, 2012, at TPF 14: Validation. Karakhanyan defeated Miller via unanimous decision to retain his Tachi Palace Fights Featherweight Championship. Karakhanyan became the first Tachi Palace Fights Featherweight Champion to defend his title.

He later vacated the title in 2013 when he signed with World Series of Fighting.

=== DREAM ===
Georgi defeated DREAM Featherweight Champion Hiroyuki Takaya at DREAM 18 (DREAM 18 & GLORY 4 Tokyo) on December 31, 2012, via split decision. The scorecard that gave the fight to Takaya was highly controversial, as Karakhanyan was considered by many to be the clear winner.

=== World Series of Fighting ===
Karakhanyan competed on the main card in a fight against Waylon Lowe at World Series of Fighting 5 on September 14, 2013. He won the fight via submission in the first round.

In November 2013, it was announced that Karakhanyan would be fighting for the inaugural WSOF Featherweight Championship against Ricky Glenn at WSOF 7. But an injury to Glenn has forced him out of the title bout and replaced by undefeated featherweight Lance Palmer. Karakhanyan won the bout via submission in the third round to become WSOF's first featherweight champion.

Karakhanyan made the first defense of his title on June 21, 2014, at World Series of Fighting 10: Branch vs. Taylor against Ricky Glenn. Despite controlling most of the first round via submission attempts, Karakhanyan lost his title when he elected not to continue between the second and third round due to a rib injury.

=== Return to Bellator ===
On September 30 Bellator announced that they have re-signed Karakhanyan to a multi-fight contract.

In his return, Karakhanyan faced Bubba Jenkins on January 16, 2015, at Bellator 132. He won the fight via technical submission in the first round. After the bout, Scott Coker announced that Karakhanyan would fight for the Featherweight title next.

Karakhanyan was expected to challenge Patrício Pitbull for his Bellator Featherweight Championship in a rematch on June 19, 2015, at Bellator 138. However, Karakhanyan pulled out of the fight due to a torn ACL and was replaced by Bellator Season Ten Featherweight tournament winner Daniel Weichel.

Karakhanyan faced Daniel Weichel on December 4, 2015, at Bellator 147. He lost the fight via unanimous decision.

After losing two fights in a row, Karakhanyan faced Bubba Jenkins in a rematch at Bellator 160 on August 26, 2016. Jenkins was favored to win the rematch, but Karakhanyan won again, this time via knock out the first minute into the first round.

Karakhanyan made a quick return to the cage as he faced Kirill Medvedovsky at Bellator 164 on November 10, 2016. He won the fight via TKO due to an injury in the first round.

Karakhanyan faced Emmanuel Sanchez at Bellator 170 on January 21, 2017. He lost the fight via majority decision.

Karakhanyan faced Daniel Pineda at Bellator 182 on August 25, 2017. He won the fight via TKO due to a doctor stoppage on a cut Pineda had suffered in the second round.

Karakhanyan faced Henry Corrales at Bellator 192 on January 20, 2018. He lost the fight via unanimous decision and was subsequently released from the promotion.

=== Absolute Championship Berkut ===
On March 7, 2018 ACB announced that they had signed Karakhanyan to a multi-fight contract. Karakhanyan won his promotional debut against Alexey Polpudnikov at ACB 86 via unanimous decision.

Karakhanyan faced Timur Nagibin at ACB 90 on November 10, 2018. In the first round, Karakhanyan locked a guillotine choke and claimed that Nagibin tapped to the choke just before the round's end. Karakhanyan released the choke when the referee intervened but at the time it was unclear whether it was due to the tap or the bell. Nevertheless, Nagibin hit Karakhanyan after the bell. Karakhanyan was clearly rocked and tried to wrestle his coach when he entered the cage. Due to the incident, Nagibin was disqualified immediately by officials. However, after the fight the promotion disqualified Karakhnanyan, blaming him to having faked being hurt and acted unsportsmanlike before the fight. Eventually, the bout was ruled as a no contest by the promotion. In Karakhanyan's response in social media, he claimed that the promotion officials encouraged him to trash talk even more as the fight was gaining attention. The promotion withheld Karakhanyan's win money and released him from his contract.

=== Second return to Bellator ===
Karakhanyan returned to Bellator in 2019 as a replacement for Ashleigh Grimshaw against Emmanuel Sanchez in the main event at Bellator 218. He lost the bout by unanimous decision.

Next Karakhanyan faced A. J. McKee at Bellator 228 on September 28, 2019. He lost the fight via knockout in just eight seconds.

Karakhanyan replaced Ryan Scope on short notice at Bellator 240 on February 22, 2020, against Paul Redmond. Karakhanyan won the fight via second round submission.

Karakhanyan faced Myles Jury on August 7, 2020, at Bellator 243. He lost the fight via split decision.

Karakhanyan was expected to face Adam Piccolotti on May 21, 2021, at Bellator 259. However, Piccolotti pulled out due to injury.

Karakhanyan faced Kiefer Crosbie on July 31, 2021, at Bellator 263. He won the bout via arm-triangle choke in the first round.

Karakhanyan, as a replacement for Adam Piccolotti, faced Saul Rogers on September 18, 2021, at Bellator 266. He lost the bout via unanimous decision.

Karakhanyan faced Adam Piccolotti on February 19, 2022, at Bellator 274. He lost the bout via unanimous decision.

Karakhanyan faced Kane Mousah on September 23, 2022, at Bellator 285. He lost the bout via unanimous decision.

== Boxing ==
Georgi defeated Tatsuro Irie on May 5, 2012, in his promotional boxing debut at Welterweight.

== Personal life ==
Georgi has three children.

== Championships and accomplishments ==
=== Mixed martial arts ===
- Tachi Palace Fights
  - TPF Featherweight Champion (One time)
- World Series of Fighting
  - WSOF Featherweight Championship (One time)

=== Jiu Jitsu ===
- Grapplers Quest
  - Grapplers Quest 2012 Men's No Gi Advanced 150 lb-159.9 lb Champion

== Mixed martial arts record ==
Professional record breakdown
47 matches	31 wins	14 losses
By knockout	7	3
By submission	16	0
By decision	8	11
Draws	1	
No contests	1	

Res.	Record	Opponent	Method	Event	Date	Round	Time	Location	Notes
Loss	31–14–1 (1)	Kane Mousah	Decision (unanimous)	Bellator 285	September 23, 2022	3	5:00	Dublin, Ireland	
Loss	31–13–1 (1)	Adam Piccolotti	Decision (unanimous)	Bellator 274	February 19, 2022	3	5:00	Uncasville, Connecticut, United States	
Loss	31–12–1 (1)	Saul Rogers	Decision (unanimous)	Bellator 266	September 18, 2021	3	5:00	San Jose, California, United States	
Win	31–11–1 (1)	Kiefer Crosbie	Submission (arm-triangle choke)	Bellator 263	July 31, 2021	1	4:25	Los Angeles, California, United States	
Win	30–11–1 (1)	Bryce Logan	Decision (split)	Bellator 251	November 5, 2020	3	5:00	Uncasville, Connecticut, United States	
Loss	29–11–1 (1)	Myles Jury	Decision (split)	Bellator 243	August 7, 2020	3	5:00	Uncasville, Connecticut, United States	
Win	29–10–1 (1)	Paul Redmond	Submission (guillotine choke)	Bellator 240	February 22, 2020	2	0:42	Dublin, Ireland	Return to Lightweight.
Loss	28–10–1 (1)	A. J. McKee	KO (punches)	Bellator 228	September 28, 2019	1	0:08	Inglewood, California, United States	Bellator Featherweight World Grand Prix Opening Round.
Loss	28–9–1 (1)	Emmanuel Sanchez	Decision (unanimous)	Bellator 218	March 22, 2019	3	5:00	Thackerville, Oklahoma, United States	
NC	28–8–1 (1)	Timur Nagibin	NC (overturned by promotion)	ACB 90: Vakhaev vs. Aliakbari	November 10, 2018	1	5:00	Moscow, Russia	Originally a DQ win for Karakhanyan after being hit after the bell; Promotion later overturned the ruling.
Win	28–8–1	Alexey Polpudnikov	Decision (unanimous)	ACB 86: Raisov vs. Balaev	May 5, 2018	3	5:00	Moscow, Russia	
Loss	27–8–1	Henry Corrales	Decision (unanimous)	Bellator 192	January 20, 2018	3	5:00	Inglewood, California, United States	
Win	27–7–1	Daniel Pineda	TKO (doctor stoppage)	Bellator 182	August 25, 2017	2	4:05	Verona, New York, United States	
Loss	26–7–1	Emmanuel Sanchez	Decision (majority)	Bellator 170	January 21, 2017	3	5:00	Inglewood, California, United States	
Win	26–6–1	Kirill Medvedovsky	TKO (injury)	Bellator 164	November 10, 2016	1	3:40	Tel Aviv, Israel	
Win	25–6–1	Bubba Jenkins	KO (punch)	Bellator 160	August 26, 2016	1	0:53	Anaheim, California, United States	
Loss	24–6–1	Pat Curran	Decision (unanimous)	Bellator 155	May 20, 2016	3	5:00	Boise, Idaho, United States	
Loss	24–5–1	Daniel Weichel	Decision (unanimous)	Bellator 147	December 4, 2015	3	5:00	San Jose, California, United States	
Win	24–4–1	Bubba Jenkins	Technical Submission (guillotine choke)	Bellator 132	January 16, 2015	1	1:49	Temecula, California, United States	
Loss	23–4–1	Ricky Glenn	TKO (retirement)	WSOF 10	June 21, 2014	2	5:00	Las Vegas, Nevada, United States	Lost the WSOF Featherweight Championship.
Win	23–3–1	Lance Palmer	Submission (guillotine choke)	WSOF 7	December 7, 2013	3	4:40	Vancouver, British Columbia, Canada	Won the inaugural WSOF Featherweight Championship.
Win	22–3–1	Waylon Lowe	Submission (guillotine choke)	WSOF 5	September 14, 2013	1	3:37	Atlantic City, New Jersey, United States	WSOF debut.
Win	21–3–1	Din Thomas	Decision (unanimous)	Legacy FC 19	April 12, 2013	3	5:00	Dallas, Texas, United States	
Win	20–3–1	Hiroyuki Takaya	Decision (split)	DREAM 18	December 31, 2012	3	5:00	Saitama, Japan	
Win	19–3–1	Micah Miller	Decision (unanimous)	Tachi Palace Fights 14	September 7, 2012	5	5:00	Lemoore, California, United States	Defended the TPF Featherweight Championship.
Win	18–3–1	Aaron Mobley	KO (punches)	Gladiator Challenge: Star Wars	April 29, 2012	1	1:03	San Jacinto, California, United States	
Win	17–3–1	Isaac DeJesus	Submission (triangle choke)	TPF 11: Redemption	December 2, 2011	1	4:02	Lemoore, California, United States	Won the TPF Featherweight Championship.
Win	16–3–1	Vince Ortiz	Submission (rear-naked choke)	BAMMA USA: Badbeat 2	June 11, 2011	1	2:01	Commerce, California, United States	
Win	15–3–1	Anthony Hayes	Submission (triangle choke)	Gladiator Challenge	April 22, 2011	1	1:09	San Jacinto, California, United States	
Loss	14–3–1	Patrício Pitbull	TKO (punches)	Bellator 37	March 19, 2011	3	0:56	Concho, Oklahoma, United States	Bellator Season Four Featherweight Tournament Quarterfinal.
Win	14–2–1	Anthony Leone	Decision (unanimous)	Bellator 28	September 9, 2010	3	5:00	New Orleans, Louisiana, United States	
Loss	13–2–1	Joe Warren	Decision (unanimous)	Bellator 18	May 13, 2010	3	5:00	Monroe, Louisiana, United States	Bellator Season Two Featherweight Tournament Semifinal.
Win	13–1–1	Bao Quach	KO (knee)	Bellator 13	April 8, 2010	1	4:05	Hollywood, Florida, United States	Bellator Season Two Featherweight Tournament Quarterfinal.
Win	12–1–1	Albert Rios	Decision (unanimous)	Call to Arms 1	May 16, 2009	3	5:00	Ontario, California, United States	
Win	11–1–1	Justin Salazar	Submission (armbar)	Missouri Total Fighting 4	December 20, 2008	1	3:11	Grain Valley, Missouri, United States	
Win	10–1–1	James Pettus	Submission (guillotine choke)	Missouri Total Fighting 4	December 20, 2008	1	4:09	Grain Valley, Missouri, United States	
Win	9–1–1	Jeff Sanchez	Submission (north-south choke)	GC 85: Cross Fire	October 25, 2008	1	1:12	San Diego, California, United States	
Win	8–1–1	Jesse Miramontes	Submission (rear-naked choke)	Apocalypse Fights 2	October 9, 2008	1	1:50	Palm Springs, Florida, United States	
Win	7–1–1	Justin Salazar	TKO (punches)	True Fight Fans	September 5, 2008	2	2:14	Grain Valley, Missouri, United States	
Win	6–1–1	Daniel Perez	Submission (kimura)	Apocalypse Fights 1	August 7, 2008	1	N/A	Palm Springs, Florida, United States	
Win	5–1–1	Armando Sanchez	Decision (unanimous)	KOTC: Opposing Force	May 15, 2008	3	5:00	Highland, California, United States	
Loss	4–1–1	Chris David	Decision (split)	Gladiator Challenge 74: Evolution	February 16, 2008	3	5:00	Los Angeles, California, United States	
Win	4–0–1	Hildred Oliney	Submission (rear-naked choke)	WCO: Kerr vs. Gavin	November 7, 2007	1	N/A	Hollywood, California, United States	
Win	3–0–1	Bobby Merrill	KO (flying knee and punches)	EFWC: The Untamed	October 6, 2007	2	0:09	Anaheim, California, United States	
Win	2–0–1	Doug Dufur	Submission (rear-naked choke)	Galaxy Productions	August 24, 2007	1	1:46	California, United States	
Draw	1–0–1	Juan Carlos Huerta	Draw	KOTC: Epicenter	June 8, 2007	2	5:00	San Jacinto, California, United States	
Win	1–0	Brent Wooten	Submission (guillotine choke)	KOTC: BOOYAA	October 13, 2006	2	1:18	San Jacinto, California, United States	

== Boxing record ==
Result	Record	Opponent	Method	Date	Round	Location	Notes
Win	1–0	Tatsuro Irie	UD	May 5, 2012	4	(United States) Hollywood Park Casino, Inglewood, California	Boxing debut.

== See also ==
- List of male mixed martial artists
