= Andrey Koreshkov =

Russian mixed martial arts fighter

Andrey Koreshkov Андрей Корешков
- Born: August 23, 1990 (age 36); Omsk, Russian SFSR, Soviet Union
- Other names: The Spartan
- Nationality: Russian
- Height: 1.85 m (6 ft 1 in)
- Weight: 170 lb (77 kg; 12 st)
- Division: Welterweight
- Reach: 76 in (193 cm)
- Style: Pankration
- Fighting out of: Omsk, Russia
- Team: RusFighters Sport Club (Saturn Prof.MMA team); BJ Penn's MMA; Reign Training Center; HB Ultimate Training Center; Black House; Storm Fight School
- Trainer: Alexander Shlemenko
- Rank: Master of Sports in ARB
- Years active: 2010–present

Mixed martial arts record
- Total: 37
- Wins: 31
- By knockout: 16
- By submission: 4
- By decision: 11
- Losses: 6
- By knockout: 2
- By submission: 2
- By decision: 2

Other information
- Mixed martial arts record from Sherdog

Andrey Koreshkov
Medal record

Representing Russia

Men's Pankration

World Combat Games
Gold medal – first place	2010 Beijing	-80 kg

World Championships
Gold medal – first place	2010 Kraków	-75 kg

Andrey Andreevich Koreshkov (Russian: Андрей Андреевич Корешков, born August 23, 1990) is a Russian mixed martial artist who competes in the welterweight division. He is the former Bellator Welterweight World Champion and competed in the Professional Fighters League (PFL).

== Mixed martial arts career ==
=== Early career ===
Koreshkov made his professional mixed martial arts (MMA) debut in October 2010. He initially competed exclusively in his native Russia and compiled an undefeated record of 8–0 (five technical knockouts, three submissions) with none of his fights going to a decision.

The MMA news site Bloody Elbow listed Koreshkov as the top welterweight prospect in their 2012 MMA scouting report.

=== Bellator MMA ===
In January 2012, it was announced that Koreshkov would make his United States debut for Bellator.

In his debut, Koreshkov faced Tiawan Howard on March 30, 2012, at Bellator LXIII. He won via KO in the first round.

Andrey next faced Derrick Krantz on May 18, 2012, at Bellator LXIX. He won the fight via TKO in the third round.

==== Bellator Season 7 Welterweight Tournament ====
Andrey then faced Jordan Smith on September 28, 2012, at Bellator LXXIV. He defeated Smith after 3 rounds, earning Koreshkov won a unanimous decision victory.

In the semifinals of the tournament, Koreshkov won via Technical Knockout, defeating Marius Zaromskis in the first round.

Koreshkov faced Lyman Good in the final of the tournament and won via unanimous decision (29–28, 29–28, 29–28). By winning the tournament, Koreshkov also secured a title shot.

Koreshkov faced Ben Askren in a bout for the Bellator Welterweight Championship on July 31, 2013, at Bellator 97. He lost the fight via TKO in the fourth round.

==== Bellator Season 10 Welterweight Tournament ====
In March 2014, Koreshkov entered the Bellator season ten welterweight tournament. He faced Nah-Shon Burrell in the quarterfinal match on March 14, 2014, at Bellator 112. He won the fight via TKO during the first minute of the first round.

Koreshkov was expected to face Sam Oropeza on May 2, 2014, in Welterweight tournament finals at Bellator 118. Oropeza, however, was injured and replaced by Justin Baesman. Koreshkov won via knockout due to a flying knee in the first round.

In the finals, Koreshkov met Adam McDonough at Bellator 122 on July 25, 2014. He won the fight via unanimous decision, securing his second tournament win and title shot.

==== Bellator Welterweight Champion ====
Koreshkov faced Douglas Lima for the Bellator Welterweight Championship at Bellator 140 on July 17, 2015. He won the fight by unanimous decision to become the new Bellator Welterweight Champion.

Koreshkov faced former UFC Lightweight Champion Benson Henderson on April 22, 2016, at the Bellator 153. He dominated the fight, winning a unanimous decision and scoring his first title defense as the Bellator welterweight champion.

Koreshkov faced Douglas Lima in a rematch in the main event at Bellator 164 on November 10, 2016. He lost the fight by knockout in the third round.

==== Post-Championship reign ====
Koreshkov was scheduled to face Fernando Gonzalez on March 3, 2017, at Bellator 174. However, Koreshkov pulled out of the fight due to injury.

Koreshkov faced Chidi Njokuani at Bellator 182 on August 25, 2017. He won the fight in the first round via a combination of punches and elbows.

Koreshkov faced Vaso Bakočević at Bellator 203 on July 14, 2018. He won the fight via knockout due to a spinning back kick to Bakocevic's mid-section early in the first round.

Koreshkov faced Douglas Lima in a third match as part of the opening round of the Bellator Welterweight World Grand Prix on September 29, 2018, at Bellator 206. He lost the fight via a rear-naked choke in the fifth round.

Koreshkov was expected to headline Bellator 219 against Lorenz Larkin on March 29, 2019. However, Larkin withdrew from the bout citing an injury and was replaced by Mike Jasper. Koreshkov won the fight via unanimous decision.

The bout with Larkin eventually took place at Bellator 229 on October 4, 2019. Koreshkov lost the back-and-forth fight via split decision.

==== AMC Fight Nights ====
While Bellator had no events booked for the beginning of 2021, Koreshkov faced Adriano Rodrigues at AMC Fight Nights: Sochi on February 23, 2021. He won the bout via a first round armbar submission.

==== Return to Bellator ====
Koreshkov faced Sabah Homasi in his return to Bellator MMA on August 13, 2021, at Bellator 264. He won the bout in dominant fashion onroute to a unanimous decision victory.

Koreshkov was scheduled to face Rustam Khabilov on October 23, 2021, at Bellator 269. However the bout was scrapped after Khabilov came down with a sickness.

Koreshkov was scheduled to face Mukhamed Berkhamov on February 19, 2022, at Bellator 274. However, Berkhamov pulled out of the bout at the beginning of February and was replaced by Chance Rencountre. He won the bout via spinning back kick which broke 5 of his opponents ribs and punctured his lung, 38 seconds into the bout.

Making a quick turnaround, Koreshkov was scheduled to face Paul Daley on May 13, 2022, at Bellator 281. However, due to undisclosed reasons, Koreshkov pulled out of the bout and was replaced by Wendell Giácomo.

With his last bout being canceled, Koreshkov, while still under contract with Bellator, faced Leonardo Cavalheiro on June 18, 2022, at Shlemenko Fighting Championship 4. Koreshkov won the bout via ground and pound TKO in the second round.

Koreshkov made his return to Bellator against Lorenz Larkin on July 30, 2023, at Bellator MMA x Rizin 2. He won the bout by split decision.

=== Professional Fighters League ===
In his PFL debut, Koreshkov faced Magomed Umalatov on April 19, 2024, at PFL 3 (2024). Umalatov's power punching & wrestling proved to be effective against Koreshkov, who was close to getting finished during the fight, but managed to survive until the final bell and lost via unanimous decision.

Koreshkov next faced Goiti Yamauchi at PFL 6 (2024) on June 28, 2024, winning the fight via unanimous decision.

On February 11, 2025, the promotion officially revealed that Koreshkov will join the 2025 PFL Welterweight Tournament. In the opening round, he faced Jason Jackson at PFL 1 on April 3, 2025. He lost the fight via a technical submission due to a rear-naked choke in the second round.

== Championships and accomplishments ==
=== Mixed martial arts ===
- Bellator
  - Bellator Welterweight World Championship (One time; former)
    - One successful title defense
  - Most bouts in Bellator Welterweight division history (19)
  - Most wins in Bellator Welterweight division history (16)
  - Tied (with Douglas Lima and Michael Page) for the most knockout wins in Bellator Welterweight division history (eight)
  - Bellator Season 7 Welterweight Tournament Winner
  - Bellator Season 10 Welterweight Tournament Winner

=== Pankration ===
- SportAccord
  - 2010 World Combat Games Pankration Gold Medalist
- International Federation of Associated Wrestling Styles
  - 2010 FILA Pankration World Championships Senior Gold Medalist.

=== Hand-to-hand combat ===
- Russian Union of Martial Arts
  - Bronze Medalist in Russian Hand-to-hand combat Championships.

== Mixed martial arts record ==
Professional record breakdown
37 matches	31 wins	6 losses
By knockout	16	2
By submission	4	2
By decision	11	2

Res.	Record	Opponent	Method	Event	Date	Round	Time	Location	Notes
Win	31–6	Taffarel Brasil	TKO (head kick and punches)	Shlemenko FC 14	July 25, 2026	2	1:34	Omsk, Russia	
Win	30–6	Jefferson Gonçalves	Decision (unanimous)	BetCity Fight Nights 138	June 6, 2026	3	5:00	Saint Petersburg, Russia	
Win	29–6	Piotr Niedzielski	TKO (punches)	Shlemenko FC 12	December 13, 2025	2	3:23	Omsk, Russia	
Loss	28–6	Jason Jackson	Technical Submission (rear-naked choke)	PFL 1 (2025)	April 3, 2025	2	4:21	Orlando, Florida, United States	2025 PFL Welterweight Tournament Quarterfinal.
Win	28–5	Goiti Yamauchi	Decision (unanimous)	PFL 6 (2024)	June 28, 2024	3	5:00	Sioux Falls, South Dakota, United States	
Loss	27–5	Magomed Umalatov	Decision (unanimous)	PFL 3 (2024)	April 19, 2024	3	5:00	Chicago, Illinois, United States	
Win	27–4	Lorenz Larkin	Decision (split)	Bellator MMA x Rizin 2	July 30, 2023	3	5:00	Saitama, Japan	
Win	26–4	Leonardo Cavalheiro da Silva	TKO (punches)	Shlemenko FC 4	June 18, 2022	2	3:39	Omsk, Russia	Middleweight bout.
Win	25–4	Chance Rencountre	TKO (spinning back kick and punches)	Bellator 274	February 19, 2022	1	0:38	Uncasville, Connecticut, United States	
Win	24–4	Sabah Homasi	Decision (unanimous)	Bellator 264	August 13, 2021	3	5:00	Uncasville, Connecticut, United States	
Win	23–4	Adriano Rodrigues de Oliveira	Submission (armbar)	AMC Fight Nights: Sochi	February 23, 2021	1	4:38	Sochi, Russia	
Loss	22–4	Lorenz Larkin	Decision (split)	Bellator 229	October 4, 2019	3	5:00	Temecula, California, United States	
Win	22–3	Michael Jasper	Decision (unanimous)	Bellator 219	March 29, 2019	3	5:00	Temecula, California, United States	
Loss	21–3	Douglas Lima	Technical Submission (rear-naked choke)	Bellator 206	September 29, 2018	5	3:04	San Jose, California, United States	Bellator Welterweight World Grand Prix Quarterfinal.
Win	21–2	Vaso Bakočević	KO (spinning back kick)	Bellator 203	July 14, 2018	1	1:06	Rome, Italy	
Win	20–2	Chidi Njokuani	TKO (punches and elbows)	Bellator 182	August 25, 2017	1	4:08	Verona, New York, United States	Catchweight (175 lb) bout; Njokuani missed weight.
Loss	19–2	Douglas Lima	KO (punches)	Bellator 164	November 10, 2016	3	1:21	Tel Aviv, Israel	Lost the Bellator Welterweight World Championship
Win	19–1	Benson Henderson	Decision (unanimous)	Bellator 153	April 22, 2016	5	5:00	Uncasville, Connecticut, United States	Defended the Bellator Welterweight World Championship.
Win	18–1	Douglas Lima	Decision (unanimous)	Bellator 140	July 17, 2015	5	5:00	Uncasville, Connecticut, United States	Won the Bellator Welterweight World Championship.
Win	17–1	Adam McDonough	Decision (unanimous)	Bellator 122	July 25, 2014	3	5:00	Temecula, California, United States	Won the Bellator Season 10 Welterweight Tournament.
Win	16–1	Justin Baesman	KO (flying knee)	Bellator 118	May 2, 2014	1	1:41	Atlantic City, New Jersey, United States	Bellator Season 10 Welterweight Tournament Semifinal.
Win	15–1	Nah-Shon Burrell	KO (knee and punches)	Bellator 112	March 14, 2014	1	0:41	Hammond, Indiana, United States	Bellator Season 10 Welterweight Tournament Quarterfinal.
Win	14–1	David Gomez	Decision (unanimous)	MFP: Battle of Empires 3	December 14, 2013	3	5:00	Khabarovsk, Russia	
Loss	13–1	Ben Askren	TKO (punches)	Bellator 97	July 31, 2013	4	2:58	Rio Rancho, New Mexico, United States	For the Bellator Welterweight World Championship.
Win	13–0	Lyman Good	Decision (unanimous)	Bellator 82	November 30, 2012	3	5:00	Mt. Pleasant, Michigan, United States	Won the Bellator Season 7 Welterweight Tournament.
Win	12–0	Marius Žaromskis	KO (punches)	Bellator 78	October 26, 2012	1	2:14	Dayton, Ohio, United States	Bellator Season 7 Welterweight Tournament Semifinal.
Win	11–0	Jordan Smith	Decision (unanimous)	Bellator 74	September 28, 2012	3	5:00	Atlantic City, New Jersey, United States	Bellator Season 7 Welterweight Tournament Quarterfinal.
Win	10–0	Derrick Krantz	TKO (knees and punches)	Bellator 69	May 18, 2012	3	0:51	Lake Charles, Louisiana, United States	
Win	9–0	Tiawan Howard	KO (punch)	Bellator 63	March 30, 2012	1	1:26	Uncasville, Connecticut, United States	Return to Welterweight.
Win	8–0	Kyacey Uscola	TKO (punches)	MFP: Battle of Empires 1	December 17, 2011	1	4:03	Khabarovsk, Russia	
Win	7–0	Tadas Aleksonis	Submission (anaconda choke)	Union of Veterans: Cup of Champions 2011	November 19, 2011	2	4:25	Novosibirsk, Russia	Return to Middleweight.
Win	6–0	Todor Zhelezkov	TKO (punches)	MFP: Open Cup of Vladivostok 2011	May 28, 2011	1	3:46	Vladivostok, Russia	
Win	5–0	Eldad Levi	TKO (punches)	MFP: Mayor's Cup 2011	May 7, 2011	2	3:47	Khabarovsk, Russia	
Win	4–0	Abdula Dadaev	Submission (armbar)	League S-70: Russia vs. Spain	April 21, 2011	1	1:28	Moscow, Russia	
Win	3–0	Eduardo Conceição	KO (knee)	Fight Festival 30	March 12, 2011	1	0:11	Helsinki, Finland	Return to Welterweight.
Win	2–0	Anzor Kardanov	KO (knee)	Union of Veterans: Cup of Friendship 2010	December 4, 2010	1	2:03	Novosibirsk, Russia	Middleweight debut.
Win	1–0	Alexey Aranzaev	Submission (armbar)	MFP: Cup of Vladivostok 2010	October 23, 2010	1	1:00	Vladivostok, Russia	Welterweight debut.

== See also ==
- List of male mixed martial artists
