= Adam Piccolotti =

American mixed martial artist

- Born: August 23, 1988 (age 38); Half Moon Bay, California, United States
- Other names: The Bomb
- Height: 5 ft 11 in (1.80 m)
- Weight: 155 lb (70 kg; 11.1 st)
- Division: Lightweight
- Reach: 70 in (178 cm)
- Fighting out of: Half Moon Bay, California, United States
- Team: Raul Castillo Martial Arts; American Kickboxing Academy (2007–present); Combat Sports Academy
- Rank: Black belt in Brazilian Jiu-Jitsu
- Years active: 2013–present

Mixed martial arts record
- Total: 21
- Wins: 15
- By knockout: 2
- By submission: 7
- By decision: 6
- Losses: 6
- By knockout: 1
- By submission: 2
- By decision: 3

Other information
- Mixed martial arts record from Sherdog

Adam Piccolotti (born August 23, 1988) is an American retired mixed martial artist who competed in the Lightweight division of Bellator MMA, and later the Professional Fighters League (PFL).

== Background ==
Born and raised in Half Moon Bay, California, Piccolotti competed in wrestling, baseball, and track and field at Half Moon Bay High School. He has an older brother. He started wrestling in the sixth grade, and was a league champion and state tournament qualifier. During the senior year of high school, he started training Brazilian jiu-jitsu and holds an accomplished background in the discipline. Gradually he picked up also kickboxing and striking, which eventually led him to mixed martial arts.

== Mixed martial arts career ==
=== Early career ===
Piccolotti made his professional MMA debut in November 2013 after a 4–0 amateur career. He competed exclusively in Dragon House, a promotion based in the San Francisco Bay Area, for the first year of his career.

After compiling an undefeated record of 4–0, Piccolotti signed with Bellator.

=== Bellator MMA ===
Piccolotti made promotional debut against Andrew Ramm at Bellator 133 on February 13, 2015. The bout took place at a catchweight of 160 lbs. He won the fight via unanimous decision.

In his next bout, Piccolotti met Salvador Becerra at the inaugural "Dynamite" event, Bellator MMA & Glory: Dynamite 1, on September 19, 2015. He won the fight via neck crank submission in the second round.

Piccolotti faced Mario Soto on December 4, 2015, at Bellator 147. He won the fight via submission, due to a rear-naked choke, in the second round.

Piccolotti was scheduled to face Jordan Parsons at Bellator 154 on May 14, 2016. This bout did not occur, however, as Parsons was struck in a hit-and-run incident and ultimately succumbed to his injuries. Piccolotti instead faced Ray Wood and won the fight via submission in the first round. In his post-fight interview, Piccolotti dedicated the victory to Parsons.

In his highest profile fight in the promotion at the time, Piccolotti faced Brandon Girtz at Bellator 165 on November 19, 2016. He won the bout by unanimous decision.

Piccolotti faced Goiti Yamauchi at Bellator 183 on September 23, 2017. He lost the bout via rear-naked choke submission in the first round.

After receiving his first professional loss at the hands of Yamauchi, Piccolotti was expected to make a quick return against Derek Anderson at Bellator 189 on December 1, 2017. Due to an injury, Piccolotti's opponent was changed to David Rickels. He lost the 160 lb catchweight fight by unanimous decision.

Piccolotti faced Carrington Banks at Bellator 199 on May 12, 2018. He won the fight via rear-naked choke submission in the third round.

Piccolotti faced James Terry on September 29, 2018, at Bellator at Bellator 206. He won the fight via unanimous decision.

Piccolotti next faced Benson Henderson at Bellator 220 on April 27, 2019. He lost the fight via split decision. 8 out of 9 media scores gave it to Piccolotti.

Piccolotti faced Jacob Smith at Bellator 226. He won the bout via rear-naked choke in the second round.

Piccolotti faced Sidney Outlaw at Bellator 244 on August 21, 2020. He lost the bout via split decision. 2 out of 2 media scores gave it to Outlaw.

Piccolotti was expected to face Georgi Karakhanyan on May 21, 2021, at Bellator 259. However, Piccolotti pulled out due to injury.

Piccolotti was expected to face Saul Rogers on September 18, 2021, at Bellator 266. However, he pulled out of the bout for unknown reasons.

Piccolotti faced Georgi Karakhanyan on February 19, 2022, at Bellator 274. He won the bout via unanimous decision. Piccolotti was then medically suspended by the Mohegan Tribe Department of Athletic Regulation after he posted a video of him vomiting in an attempt to cut weight prior to the fight; he was also fined $2,500, although the outcome of the match was not overturned.

Despite the Mohegan Tribe suspension, Piccolotti was scheduled to face Tofiq Musayev on July 22, 2022, at Bellator 283. Piccolotti however pulled out of the bout due to injury.

Piccolotti headlined Bellator 287 on October 29, 2022, against Mansour Barnaoui. He lost the bout in the second round via rear-naked choke.

Piccolotti, as a replacement for Jay Jay Wilson, faced Mandel Nallo on March 31, 2023, at Bellator 293. He won the fight via a rear-naked choke submission in the third round.

=== Professional Fighters League ===
After almost 8 years with Bellator, on August 13, 2023, it was announced that Piccolotti had signed a contract with Professional Fighters League (PFL).

Piccolotti started the 2024 season with a bout against Jay Jay Wilson on April 12, 2024 at PFL 2. However, Wilson withdrew from the bout for unknown reasons and was replaced by tournament alternate Elvin Espinoza. Piccolotti was knocked out in the third round by a flying knee.

In his sophomore performance, Piccolotti faced Michael Dufort on June 21, 2024 at PFL 5, winning the bout via split decision.

== Championships and accomplishments ==
- Bellator MMA
  - Most submission wins in Bellator Lightweight division history (six)
- Dragon House MMA
  - Dragon House Lightweight Championship (one time; former)

== Mixed martial arts record ==
Professional record breakdown
21 matches	15 wins	6 losses
By knockout	2	1
By submission	7	2
By decision	6	3

Res.	Record	Opponent	Method	Event	Date	Round	Time	Location	Notes
Win	15–6	Michael Dufort	Decision (split)	PFL 5 (2024)	June 21, 2024	3	5:00	Salt Lake City, Utah, United States	
Loss	14–6	Elvin Espinoza	KO (flying knee)	PFL 2 (2024)	April 12, 2024	3	2:23	Las Vegas, Nevada, United States	
Win	14–5	Mandel Nallo	Submission (rear-naked choke)	Bellator 293	March 31, 2023	3	4:26	Temecula, California, United States	
Loss	13–5	Mansour Barnaoui	Submission (rear-naked choke)	Bellator 287	October 29, 2022	2	2:51	Milan, Italy	
Win	13–4	Georgi Karakhanyan	Decision (unanimous)	Bellator 274	February 19, 2022	3	5:00	Uncasville, Connecticut, United States	
Loss	12–4	Sidney Outlaw	Decision (split)	Bellator 244	August 21, 2020	3	5:00	Uncasville, Connecticut, United States	
Win	12–3	Jacob Smith	Submission (rear-naked choke)	Bellator 226	September 7, 2019	2	2:34	San Jose, California, United States	
Loss	11–3	Benson Henderson	Decision (split)	Bellator 220	April 27, 2019	3	5:00	San Jose, California, United States	
Win	11–2	James Terry	Decision (unanimous)	Bellator 206	September 29, 2018	3	5:00	San Jose, California, United States	Catchweight (160 lbs) bout.
Win	10–2	Carrington Banks	Submission (rear-naked choke)	Bellator 199	May 12, 2018	3	4:41	San Jose, California, United States	
Loss	9–2	David Rickels	Decision (unanimous)	Bellator 189	December 1, 2017	3	5:00	Thackerville, Oklahoma, United States	Catchweight (160 lbs) bout.
Loss	9–1	Goiti Yamauchi	Submission (rear-naked choke)	Bellator 183	September 24, 2017	1	3:19	San Jose, California, United States	
Win	9–0	Brandon Girtz	Decision (unanimous)	Bellator 165	November 19, 2016	3	5:00	San Jose, California, United States	
Win	8–0	Ray Wood	Submission (rear-naked choke)	Bellator 154	May 14, 2016	1	3:17	San Jose, California, United States	
Win	7–0	Mario Soto	Submission (rear-naked choke)	Bellator 147	December 4, 2015	2	3:25	San Jose, California, United States	
Win	6–0	Salvador Becerra	Submission (neck crank)	Bellator MMA & Glory: Dynamite 1	September 19, 2015	2	1:47	San Jose, California, United States	
Win	5–0	Andrew Ramm	Decision (unanimous)	Bellator 133	February 13, 2015	3	5:00	Fresno, California, United States	Catchweight (160 lbs) bout.
Win	4–0	Tristan Arenal	Submission (rear-naked choke)	Dragon House 18	November 8, 2014	2	3:33	San Francisco, California, United States	Won the vacant Dragon House Lightweight Championship.
Win	3–0	Eugene Marenya	TKO (punches)	Dragon House 17	August 9, 2014	3	3:28	San Francisco, California, United States	
Win	2–0	Cody Orrison	Decision (split)	Dragon House 16	May 3, 2014	3	5:00	San Francisco, California, United States	
Win	1–0	Jeffery Peterson	TKO (punches)	Dragon House 15	November 2, 2013	1	4:04	San Francisco, California, United States	
