= Budo Sento Championship =

Mixed martial arts promotion company

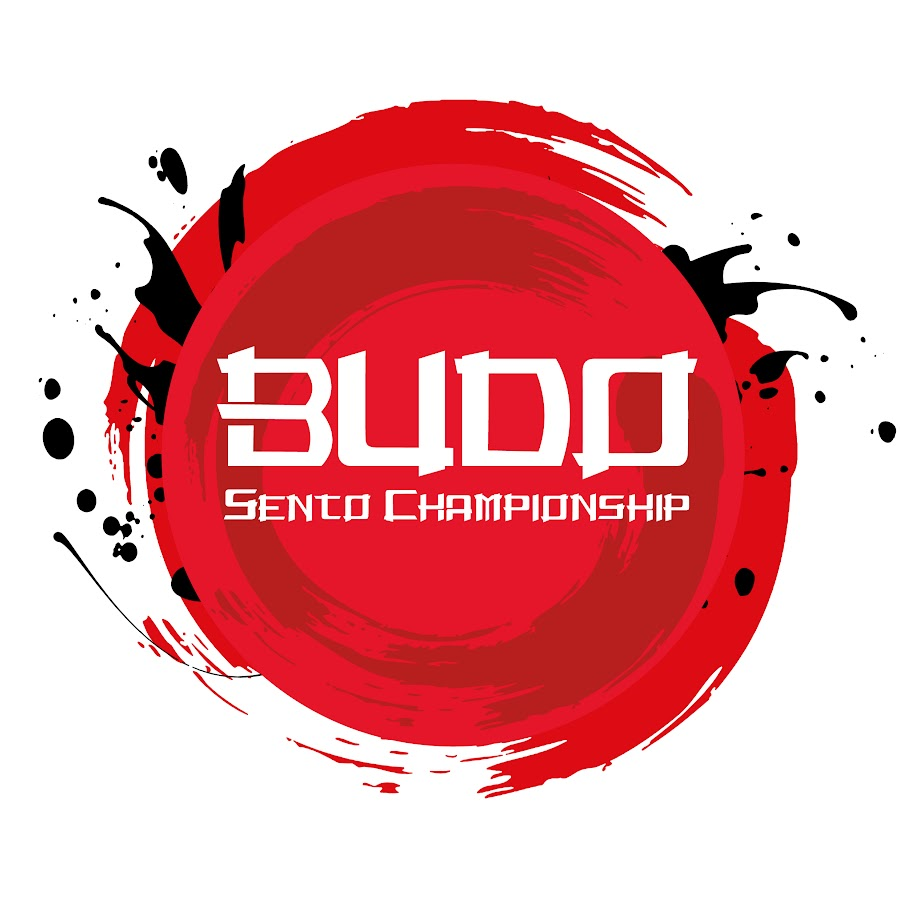
- Type: Private
- Industry: Combat sports (Mixed martial arts, Muay thai, Submission grappling)
- Founded: 2020; 6 years ago
- Founder: Iván Macías
- Headquarters: Mexico City, Mexico
- Website: budosc.com

Budo Sento Championship (BSC), also known as Budo SC, is a Mexican combat sport promotion based in Mexico City. It was founded in 2020. Although its main sport is mixed martial arts, Budo SC has also hosted muay thai and submission grappling bouts.

== History ==
Budo Sento Championship was founded by businessman and lawyer Iván Macías in 2020 as an opportunity to further expand the growth of Mexican MMA. Macías said in an interview that the idea came about after the increase in leisure time due to the COVID-19 pandemic in the country.

November 14, 2020, was the date of the inaugural event, "BSC Volume 1," featuring the main event between Brazilian Wilson Reis and Mexican Carlos Briseño at the Foro Radi in Mexico City. Reis dominated much of the fight, earning the victory by submission in the second round.

BSC Volume 32 was announced to take place in Monterrey, a city that has hosted multiple LUX Fight League events in the past. The main event of the evening was Erik Pérez vs. José Alberto Quiñónez for the symbolic “Legends” belt, which ended in a victory for Pérez.

== Current champions ==
Mixed martial arts
Division	Upper weight limit	Champion	Since	Title Defenses
Heavyweight	120 kg (264.6 lb)	(Mexico) Hugo Lezama	August 11, 2023 (BSC 16)	1
Light heavyweight	93 kg (205.0 lb)	(Mexico) Jorge González Villa	September 9, 2022 (BSC 10)	0
Welterweight	77 kg (169.8 lb)	(Mexico) Daniel Sánchez Vázquez	August 1, 2025 (BSC 30)	0
Lightweight	70 kg (154.3 lb)	Vacant	/	-
Featherweight	65 kg (143.3 lb)	(Mexico) Allan Ruíz	February 17, 2023 (BSC 13)	0
Bantamweight	61 kg (134.5 lb)	(Mexico) Víctor Madrigal	July 8, 2022 (BSC 9)	1
Flyweight	57 kg (125.7 lb)	(Mexico) Cristian Torres	June 28, 2024 (BSC 23)	0
Women's Bantamweight	61 kg (134.5 lb)	Vacant	/	-
Women's Flyweight	57 kg (125.7 lb)	(Colombia) Alejandra Lara	August 2, 2024 (BSC 24)	0
Women's Strawweight	53 kg (116.8 lb)	(Argentina) Silvana Gómez Juárez	May 30, 2025 (BSC 29)	0
Muay thai (Budo Striking)
Middleweight	84 kg (185.2 lb)	(Mexico) Antonio Totomol	May 30, 2025 (BSC 29)	0
Bantamweight	61 kg (134.5 lb)	(Mexico) Aldo Cruz	September 26, 2025 (BSC 31)	0
Strawweight	55 kg (121.3 lb)	(Mexico) Erick Flores	September 26, 2025 (BSC 31)	0
Women's Flyweight	57 kg (125.7 lb)	(Mexico) Laura Burgos	February 14, 2025 (BSC 27)	0
Atomweight	48 kg (105.8 lb)	(Mexico) Verónica Rodríguez	November 28, 2025 (BSC 32)	0

== Budo SC title history ==
=== Men's Heavyweight Championship ===
Mixed martial arts (MMA)
No.	Name	Event	Date	Reign (total)	Defenses
1	(Mexico) Hugo Lezama def. Alejandro Solorzano	BSC 16; Mexico City, Mexico	Aug 11, 2023		1. def Victor de Paula at BSC 26 on Nov 8, 2024

=== Men's Light heavyweight Championship ===
Mixed martial arts (MMA)
No.	Name	Event	Date	Reign (total)	Defenses
1	(Mexico) Jorge González Villa def. Walter Luna	BSC 10; Mexico City, Mexico	Sept 9, 2022		

=== Men's Middleweight Championship ===
Muay Thai
No.	Name	Event	Date	Reign (total)	Defenses
1	(Mexico) Antonio Totomol def. Ricardo Chávez Villaseñor	BSC 29; Mexico City, Mexico	May 30, 2025		

=== Men's Welterweight Championship ===
Mixed martial arts (MMA)
No.	Name	Event	Date	Reign (total)	Defenses
1	(Mexico) Ricardo Chávez Villaseñor def. Chirstian Alquinga	BSC 18; Mexico City, Mexico	Nov 10, 2023	?	1. def Erick Montaño at BSC 22 on May 31, 2024; 2. def Carlos Camargo at BSC 25 on Sept 27, 2024
Chávez Villaseñor vacated the title.
2	(Mexico) Daniel Sánchez Vázquez def. Adrián Oviedo	BSC 30; Mexico City, Mexico	Aug 1, 2025		

=== Men's Lightweight Championship ===
Mixed martial arts (MMA)
No.	Name	Event	Date	Reign (total)	Defenses
1	(Mexico) Daniel Salas def. Ednilson Santos	BSC 5 Mexico City, Mexico	Dec 3, 2021	?	1. def Adriano Nunes at BSC 12 on Dec 9, 2022; 2. def Allan Ruíz at BSC 19 on Dec 1, 2023
Salas vacated the title.

=== Men's Featherweight Championship ===
Mixed martial arts (MMA)
No.	Name	Event	Date	Reign (total)	Defenses
1	(Ecuador) Freddy Linares def. Alexis Rosaldo	BSC 4 Mexico City, Mexico	Oct 8, 2021	497	1. def Derian Calzada at BSC 8 on May 20, 2022
2	(Mexico) Allan Ruíz	BSC 13; Mexico City, Mexico	Feb 17, 2023		
Muay Thai
1	(Sweden) Magnus Andersson def. Oscar Magallán	BSC 13; Mexico City, Mexico	Apr 21, 2023		

=== Men's Bantamweight Championship ===
Mixed martial arts (MMA)
No.	Name	Event	Date	Reign (total)	Defenses
1	(Mexico) Víctor Madrigal def. Donny Matos	BSC 9 Mexico City, Mexico	Jul 8, 2022	441	1. def José Alberto Quiñónez at BSC 14 on Apr 21, 2023
—	(Mexico) Jordi Maya def. Erick Ruano Barrera	BSC 17; Mexico City, Mexico	Sept 22, 2023	—	
Muay Thai
1	(Mexico) Carlos Pérez def. Miguel José Calderón	BSC 28; Mexico City, Mexico	March 27, 2025		
2	(Mexico) Aldo Cruz	BSC 31; Mexico City, Mexico	Sept 26, 2025		1. def Pablo Orue at BSC 33 on Feb 26, 2022

=== Men's Flyweight Championship ===
Mixed martial arts (MMA)
No.	Name	Event	Date	Reign (total)	Defenses
1	(Mexico) Jaime Granados def. Jhermys Coronado	BSC 20; Mexico City, Mexico	Feb 23, 2024	126	
2	(Mexico) Cristian Torres	BSC 23; Mexico City, Mexico	Jun 28, 2024		

=== Men's Strawweight Championship ===
Muay Thai
No.	Name	Event	Date	Reign (total)	Defenses
1	(Mexico) Erick Flores def. Emiliano Sanvicente	BSC 31; Mexico City, Mexico	Sept 26, 2025		

=== Women's Bantamweight Championship ===
Mixed martial arts (MMA)
No.	Name	Event	Date	Reign (total)	Defenses
1	(Mexico) Regina Tarín def. Luisa Fernanda Cifuentes	BSC 25; Mexico City, Mexico	Sept 27, 2024		
Tarín vacated the title.

=== Women's Flyweight Championship ===
Mixed martial arts (MMA)
No.	Name	Event	Date	Reign (total)	Defenses
1	(Brazil) Nayara Maia def. Karla Pastrana	BSC 4 Mexico City, Mexico	Oct 8, 2021		1. def Reina Cordoba at BSC 7 on Apr 10, 2022
Maia vacated the title.
2	(Colombia) Alejandra Lara def. Silvana Gómez Juárez	BSC 24; Mexico City, Mexico	Aug 2, 2024		
Muay Thai
1	(Mexico) Laura Burgos def. Alejandra Montiel	BSC 27; Mexico City, Mexico	Feb 14, 2025		
Submission grappling
1	(Mexico) Paola Gutiérrez def. Jessica Aguilar	BSC 13; Mexico City, Mexico	Feb 17, 2023		

=== Women's Strawweight Championship ===
Mixed martial arts (MMA)
No.	Name	Event	Date	Reign (total)	Defenses
1	(Mexico) Nadia Vera def. Guiliana Cosnard	BSC 21; Mexico City, Mexico	Apr 12, 2024	413	
2	(Argentina) Silvana Gómez Juárez	BSC 29; Mexico City, Mexico	May 30, 2025		
Muay Thai
1	(Mexico) Sarai Saenz def. Elizabeth Quinn	BSC 7 Mexico City, Mexico	Apr 10, 2022		

=== Women’s Atomweight Championship ===
Muay Thai
No.	Name	Event	Date	Reign (total)	Defenses
1	(Mexico) Cynthia Flores def. Verónica Rodríguez	BSC 29; Mexico City, Mexico	May 30, 2025		
Flores vacated the title.
2	(Mexico) Verónica Rodríguez def. Ana Márquez	BSC 28; Monterrey, Mexico	November 30, 2025		

== List of events ==
All Budo SC events, except for #15 and #32, were held in Mexico City.

#	Event	Date	Venue	Location
36	BSC: Volumen 36	September 4, 2026	Gimnasio Olímpico Juan de la Barrera	México City, Mexico
35	BSC: Volumen 35	July 3, 2026	Gimnasio Olímpico Juan de la Barrera	México City, Mexico
34	BSC: Volumen 34	April 30, 2026	Centro Banamex	México City, Mexico
33	BSC: Volumen 33	February 26, 2026	Centro Banamex	México City, Mexico
32	BSC: Volumen 32	November 28, 2025	Arena Mobil	Monterrey, Mexico
31	BSC: Volumen 31	September 26, 2025	Gimnasio Olímpico Juan de la Barrera	México City, Mexico
30	BSC: Volumen 30	August 1, 2025	Foro Polanco Moliere	México City, Mexico
29	BSC: Volumen 29	May 30, 2025	Salón Villa Flamingos	México City, Mexico
28	BSC: Volumen 28	March 27, 2025	Gimnasio Olímpico Juan de la Barrera	México City, Mexico
27	BSC: Volumen 27	February 14, 2025	Gimnasio Olímpico Juan de la Barrera	México City, Mexico
26	BSC: Volumen 26	November 8, 2024	Gimnasio Olímpico Juan de la Barrera	México City, Mexico
25	BSC: Volumen 25	September 27, 2024	Gimnasio Olímpico Juan de la Barrera	México City, Mexico
24	BSC: Volumen 24	August 2, 2024	Gimnasio Olímpico Juan de la Barrera	México City, Mexico
23	BSC: Volumen 23	June 28, 2024	Gimnasio Olímpico Juan de la Barrera	México City, Mexico
22	BSC: Volumen 22	May 31, 2024	Gimnasio Olímpico Juan de la Barrera	México City, Mexico
21	BSC: Volumen 21	April 12, 2024	Gimnasio Olímpico Juan de la Barrera	México City, Mexico
20	BSC: Volumen 20	February 23, 2024	Gimnasio Olímpico Juan de la Barrera	México City, Mexico
19	BSC: Volumen 19	December 1, 2023	Gimnasio Olímpico Juan de la Barrera	México City, Mexico
18	BSC: Volumen 18	November 10, 2023	Gimnasio Olímpico Juan de la Barrera	México City, Mexico
17	BSC: Volumen 17	September 22, 2023	Gimnasio Olímpico Juan de la Barrera	México City, Mexico
16	BSC: Volumen 16	August 11, 2023	Gimnasio Olímpico Juan de la Barrera	México City, Mexico
15	BSC: Volumen 15	June 30, 2023	Auditorio Benito Juárez	Veracruz, Mexico
14	BSC: Volumen 14	April 21, 2023	Gimnasio Olímpico Juan de la Barrera	México City, Mexico
13	BSC: Volumen 13	February 17, 2023	Gimnasio Olímpico Juan de la Barrera	México City, Mexico
12	BSC: Volumen 12	December 9, 2022	Gimnasio Olímpico Juan de la Barrera	México City, Mexico
11	BSC: Volumen 11	November 4, 2022	Gimnasio Olímpico Juan de la Barrera	México City, Mexico
10	BSC: Volumen 10	September 9, 2022	Gimnasio Olímpico Juan de la Barrera	México City, Mexico
9	BSC: Volumen 9	July 8, 2022	Gimnasio Olímpico Juan de la Barrera	México City, Mexico
8	BSC: Volumen 8	May 20, 2022	Gimnasio Olímpico Juan de la Barrera	México City, Mexico
7	BSC: Volumen 7	April 10, 2022	Gimnasio Olímpico Juan de la Barrera	México City, Mexico
6	BSC: Volumen 6	March 4, 2022	Gimnasio Olímpico Juan de la Barrera	México City, Mexico
5	BSC: Volumen 5	December 3, 2021	Gimnasio Olímpico Juan de la Barrera	México City, Mexico
4	BSC: Volumen 4	October 8, 2021	Gimnasio Olímpico Juan de la Barrera	México City, Mexico
3	BSC: Volumen 3	July 3, 2021	Foro Radi	México City, Mexico
2	BSC: Volumen 2	April 10, 2021	Studio 5 de Mayo	México City, Mexico
1	BSC: Volumen 1	November 14, 2020	Foro Radi	México City, Mexico
