= Sabah Homasi =

American mixed martial arts fighter

- Born: October 19, 1988 (age 38); New Brunswick, New Jersey, United States
- Other names: The Punisher; The Sleek Sheik
- Nationality: American
- Height: 6 ft 0 in (183 cm)
- Weight: 170 lb (77 kg; 12 st 2 lb)
- Division: Welterweight; Middleweight
- Reach: 72 in (183 cm)
- Stance: Orthodox
- Fighting out of: Coconut Creek, Florida, United States
- Team: Cooper's Gym (formerly); American Top Team (2008–present)
- Years active: 2009–present

Mixed martial arts record
- Total: 30
- Wins: 18
- By knockout: 12
- By submission: 3
- By decision: 3
- Losses: 12
- By knockout: 8
- By submission: 2
- By decision: 2

Other information
- Mixed martial arts record from Sherdog

Sabah Homasi (born October 19, 1988) is an American mixed martial artist and bare-knuckle boxer currently competing with Bare Knuckle Fighting Championship. A professional competitor since 2009, he previously competed in the Welterweight division for the UFC, Bellator MMA, Titan FC, and Strikeforce.

== Background ==
Born in New Brunswick, New Jersey, and raised in nearby East Brunswick, Homasi moved at the age of 10 to Florida and to Dearborn when he had started high school and began training in mixed martial arts. He is of Lebanese descent.

== Mixed martial arts career ==
=== Early career ===
Homasi made his professional MMA debut in May 2009. Over the next 7 years he fought for various promotions, including Strikeforce, Titan FC and Bellator MMA. Before joining the UFC he amassed a record of 11 wins against 5 losses.

=== The Ultimate Fighter ===
Homasi competed on The Ultimate Fighter: American Top Team vs. Blackzilians, the 21st season of the reality show The Ultimate Fighter. He represented American Top Team. In his first fight on the show, Homasi lost to Carrington Banks via decision after three rounds.

=== Ultimate Fighting Championship ===
Homasi made his debut with the Ultimate Fighting Championship on August 20, 2016 against Tim Means on the main card of UFC 202. He lost the fight via TKO in the second round.

In his second fight for the promotion, Homasi faced Abdul Razak Alhassan on December 2, 2017 at UFC 218. He lost the fight via TKO in the first round after a controversial early stoppage.

Due to the stoppage controversy of their first bout, a rematch with Alhassan took place on January 20, 2018 at UFC 220. Homasi lost the fight via knockout in the first round. Homasi was subsequently released from the UFC.

=== Return to Bellator ===
In April 2019, Homasi announced that he had signed a contract with Bellator. In his promotional return, Homasi knocked out Micah Terrill in 17 seconds at Bellator 225 on August 24, 2019.

Homasi was next expected to face Paul Daley at Bellator 232 on October 26, 2019. However, he withdrew from the bout due to injury and was replaced by Saad Awad. The bout was then rescheduled to take place at Bellator 241 on March 13, 2020, but the whole event was eventually cancelled due to the prevailing COVID-19 pandemic.

Homasi next faced Curtis Millender on August 7, 2020 at Bellator 243. He won the fight via unanimous decision.

Homasi faced Bobby Voelker October 29, 2020 at Bellator 250. He won the fight via flying knee in the second round. Subsequently, Homasi signed a multi-fight contract with the promotion.

Homasi was rescheduled for the third time to face Paul Daley on April 16, 2021 at Bellator 257. Homasi lost the bout in the second round via TKO after Daley survived getting dropped by Homasi in the first round.

Homasi faced Andrey Koreshkov on August 13, 2021 at Bellator 264. He lost the bout via unanimous decision.

Homasi faced Jaleel Willis on January 29, 2022 at Bellator 273. He won the bout via arm-triangle choke in the first round.

As the first fight of his new multi-fight contract, Homasi faced Maycon Mendonça at Bellator 282 on June 24, 2022. He won the bout after knocking Maycon out in the first round.

Homasi faced Brennan Ward on February 4, 2023 at Bellator 290. Homasi lost by technical knockout in the second round, getting dropped with a head kick and finished with ground and pound.

Homasi faced Levan Chokheli on September 23, 2023 at Bellator 299. He lost the fight via front kick knockout in the first round.

On January 23, 2024, he announced that he was no longer with the promotion.

== Bare-knuckle boxing ==
=== Bare Knuckle Fighting Championship ===
Homasi made his Bare Knuckle Fighting Championship debut against Eduardo Peralta on December 21, 2024 at BKFC on DAZN 3. He won by knockout in the second round.

Homasi faced Jonny Tello on April 4, 2025 at BKFC 71 Dubai: Day 1. He lost the fight by unanimous decision.

Homasi faced Leonel Carrera on March 20, 2026 at BKFC 87. Homasi lost by disqualification by landing an illegal spinning backfist during the bout.

== Championships and accomplishments ==
- MMAjunkie.com
  - 2021 April Fight of the Month vs. Paul Daley

== Mixed martial arts record ==
Professional record breakdown
30 matches	18 wins	12 losses
By knockout	12	8
By submission	3	2
By decision	3	2

Res.	Record	Opponent	Method	Event	Date	Round	Time	Location	Notes
Win	18–12	Rafael Celestino	KO (knee and punches)	Gamebred Bareknuckle MMA 10	May 1, 2026	1	1:18	Miami, Florida, United States	Middleweight debut. Bare knuckle MMA.
Loss	17–12	Levan Chokheli	KO (front kick)	Bellator 299	September 23, 2023	1	1:51	Dublin, Ireland	
Loss	17–11	Brennan Ward	TKO (head kick and punches)	Bellator 290	February 4, 2023	2	1:34	Inglewood, California, United States	
Win	17–10	Maycon Mendonça	KO (punch)	Bellator 282	June 24, 2022	1	0:58	Uncasville, Connecticut, United States	
Win	16–10	Jaleel Willis	Submission (arm-triangle choke)	Bellator 273	January 29, 2022	1	1:42	Phoenix, Arizona, United States	
Loss	15–10	Andrey Koreshkov	Decision (unanimous)	Bellator 264	August 13, 2021	3	5:00	Uncasville, Connecticut, United States	
Loss	15–9	Paul Daley	TKO (punches)	Bellator 257	April 16, 2021	2	1:44	Uncasville, Connecticut, United States	Catchweight (175 lb) bout.
Win	15–8	Bobby Voelker	KO (flying knee and punches)	Bellator 250	October 29, 2020	2	0:20	Uncasville, Connecticut, United States	
Win	14–8	Curtis Millender	Decision (unanimous)	Bellator 243	August 7, 2020	3	5:00	Uncasville, Connecticut, United States	
Win	13–8	Micah Terrill	KO (punch)	Bellator 225	August 24, 2019	1	0:17	Bridgeport, Connecticut, United States	
Win	12–8	Muhammad Abdullah	Decision (unanimous)	WXC 74	November 9, 2018	3	5:00	Southgate, Michigan, United States	
Loss	11–8	Abdul Razak Alhassan	KO (punch)	UFC 220	January 20, 2018	1	3:47	Boston, Massachusetts, United States	
Loss	11–7	Abdul Razak Alhassan	TKO (punches)	UFC 218	December 2, 2017	1	4:21	Detroit, Michigan, United States	
Loss	11–6	Tim Means	TKO (punches)	UFC 202	August 20, 2016	2	2:56	Las Vegas, Nevada, United States	
Win	11–5	Jorge Patino	KO (punch)	Titan FC 40	August 5, 2016	2	1:18	Coral Gables, Florida, United States	Catchweight (180 lb) bout.
Win	10–5	Victor Regis Eustáquio	TKO (punches)	Titan FC 39	June 10, 2016	1	2:21	Coral Gables, Florida, United States	
Win	9–5	Derrick Kennington	TKO (punches)	Absolute FC 25	April 1, 2016	1	1:13	Coconut Creek, Florida, United States	
Loss	8–5	Reggie Pena	TKO (punches)	Supreme FC 1	August 15, 2015	2	1:07	Tampa, Florida, United States	
Win	8–4	Eric Moon	Submission (guillotine choke)	Bellator 124	September 12, 2014	2	1:07	Plymouth Township, Michigan, United States	
Win	7–4	Jerome Jones	TKO (punches)	More Than Conquerors: In the Beginning	April 3, 2014	2	1:02	Fort Lauderdale, Florida, United States	
Win	6–4	Michael Trujillo	TKO (head kick and punches)	CFA 12	October 12, 2013	1	4:25	Coral Gables, Florida, United States	
Loss	5–4	Ricky Legere Jr.	Submission (rear-naked choke)	Bellator 93	March 7, 2013	2	2:52	Temecula, California, United States	
Win	5–3	Jose Caceres	Decision (split)	CFA 7	June 30, 2012	3	5:00	Coral Gables, Florida, United States	Catchweight (165 lb) bout.
Loss	4–3	Jon Manley	Decision (unanimous)	W-1 MMA 7	October 15, 2011	3	5:00	Coral Gables, Florida, United States	
Win	4–2	Kevin Pearson	Submission (kimura)	World Extreme Fighting 46	April 22, 2011	2	1:35	Orlando, Florida, United States	
Win	3–2	Eliton Sarmento	TKO (retirement)	World Extreme Fighting 45	January 22, 2011	2	5:00	Jacksonville, Florida, United States	
Loss	2–2	Frank Carrillo	TKO (elbows)	Bellator 21	June 10, 2010	3	3:16	Hollywood, Florida, United States	Catchweight (175 lb) bout.
Loss	2–1	John Kelly	Submission (rear-naked choke)	Strikeforce: Miami	January 30, 2010	2	2:48	Sunrise, Florida, United States	
Win	2–0	Adrian Miles	TKO (punches)	Inferno MMA 1	July 17, 2009	1	1:28	Kennesaw, Georgia, United States	
Win	1–0	Lindon Mitchell	TKO (punches)	Xtreme Fight Nights: Da Matta vs. Thorne	May 14, 2009	1	1:37	Fort Lauderdale, Florida, United States	Welterweight debut.

== Bare knuckle boxing record ==
Professional record breakdown
3 matches	1 win	2 losses
By knockout	1	0
By decision	0	1
By disqualification	0	1

Res.	Record	Opponent	Method	Event	Date	Round	Time	Location	Notes
Loss	1–2	Leonel Carrera	DQ (illegal strike)	BKFC 87	March 20, 2026	2	1:06	Hollywood, Florida, United States	
Loss	1–1	Jonny Tello	Decision (unanimous)	BKFC 71 Dubai: Day 1	April 4, 2025	5	2:00	Dubai, United Arab Emirates	
Win	1–0	Eduardo Peralta	KO (punch)	BKFC on DAZN Hollywood, FL: Warren vs. Richman	December 21, 2024	2	1:02	Hollywood, Florida, United States	

== See also ==
- List of Bellator MMA alumni
- List of male mixed martial artists
