= DeAnna Bennett =

American mixed martial arts fighter

- Born: DeAnna Danielle Bennett; November 18, 1984 (age 41); Fremont, California, U.S
- Other names: Vitamin D
- Height: 5 ft 4 in (1.63 m)
- Weight: 125 lb (57 kg; 8.9 st)
- Division: Strawweight; Flyweight
- Fighting out of: Philadelphia, PA, U.S.
- Team: Four7 Fight Team (formerly); The Pit Elevated (formerly); Killer B CSA (2018–2022); Marquez MMA (2022–present)
- Rank: Brown belt in Brazilian Jiu-Jitsu under Dante Rivera
- Years active: 2012–present

Mixed martial arts record
- Total: 25
- Wins: 14
- By knockout: 2
- By submission: 2
- By decision: 10
- Losses: 10
- By knockout: 1
- By submission: 4
- By decision: 5
- Draws: 1

Other information
- Mixed martial arts record from Sherdog

DeAnna Danielle Bennett (born November 18, 1984) is an American mixed martial artist who competes in the Flyweight division. A professional since 2012, she has previously competed for Bellator MMA, Invicta Fighting Championships, and Ultimate Fighting Championship (UFC).

== Background ==
Bennett wrestled and played water polo for American High School before graduating in 2002. Bennett briefly attended an art college, but dropped out. She credits her "being a fat kid" for motivating her to join a kickboxing gym to stay in shape, and eventually competing in Muay Thai kickboxing.

== Mixed martial arts career ==
=== Early career ===
After a short amateur MMA career in 2011, Bennett made her professional MMA debut in February 2012 for Showdown Fights. She competed for the promotion four times over the next two years, winning all of her bouts. Notably beating stand outs Sharon Jacobson, Colleen Schneider and Julianna Peña respectively.

=== Invicta FC ===
Bennett made her Invicta FC debut on September 6, 2014, at Invicta FC 8, where she defeated Michelle Ould by TKO in the second round.

In her second fight for the promotion, Bennett faced Jennifer Maia on December 5, 2014, at Invicta FC 10. She won the fight by unanimous decision.

Bennett next faced Norma Rueda Center on February 27, 2015, at Invicta FC 11. She again won the fight by unanimous decision.

=== The Ultimate Fighter ===
In August 2017, it was announced that Bennett would be one of the fighters featured on The Ultimate Fighter 26, where the process to crown the UFC's inaugural 125-pound women's champion will take place. Bennett was selected seventh by coach Eddie Alvarez. She faced Karine Gevorgyan in the opening round and won via TKO in the first round. In the quarter-finals Bennett faced Sijara Eubanks losing via first round knockout.

=== Ultimate Fighting Championship ===
Bennett faced Melinda Fábián on December 1, 2017 at The Ultimate Fighter: A New World Champion#The Ultimate Fighter 26 Finale. The fight ended as a majority draw and Bennett was subsequently released from the promotion.

=== Return to Invicta ===
Bennett returned to Invicta to face Karina Rodríguez on March 24, 2018 at Invicta FC 28: Morandin vs. Jandiroba. She won the fight by split decision. Bennett then entered a flyweight tournament where she defeated Miranda Maverick by unanimous decision but lost in the final in a rematch against Karina Rodriguez.

=== Bellator ===
Bennett made her promotional debut against Liz Carmouche at Bellator 246 on September 12, 2020. She lost the bout via a rear-naked choke submission in the third round.

Bennett was scheduled to face Alejandra Lara on July 31, 2021 at Bellator 263. The bout was rescheduled for unknown reasons to take place on August 20, 2021 at Bellator 265. On August 13, it was announced that the bout was moved once again, this time to Bellator 266. At the weigh-ins, Bennett missed weight for her bout. Bennett weighed in at 129.2 pounds, 3.2 pounds over the flyweight non-title fight limit. The bout proceeded at catchweight and Bennett was fined a percentage of her purse which went to Lara. Bennett won the bout in dominant fashion via unanimous decision.

Bennett faced Justine Kish on February 19, 2022 at Bellator 274. She won the bout in dominant fashion via unanimous decision.

Bennett rematched Justine Kish on August 12, 2022 at Bellator 284. At weigh ins, Kish came in at 128.4 lbs, 2.4 pounds over the weight limit, for the flyweight bout, resulting in her being a fined a percentage of her purse which went to Bennett and the bout proceeded at catchweight. Bennett won the bout again via unanimous decision.

Bennett faced Liz Carmouche in a rematch for the Bellator Women's Flyweight World Championship on April 21, 2023 at Bellator 294. At the weigh-ins, Bennett weighed in at 126.2 pounds, 1.2 pounds over the title flyweight fight limit. The bout proceeded at catchweight with Bennett being fined 30% of her purse, which went to Carmouche. Carmouche also chose to keep the title on the line, meaning if she lost the fight, the title would have become vacant. She lost the fight by an arm-triangle choke submission in the fourth round.

== Professional grappling career ==
Bennett was booked to compete against Marissa Pacelli at Fury Pro Grappling 7 on May 27, 2023. She lost the match by unanimous decision.

== Mixed martial arts record ==
Professional record breakdown
25 matches	14 wins	10 losses
By knockout	2	1
By submission	2	4
By decision	10	5
Draws	1	

Res.	Record	Opponent	Method	Event	Date	Round	Time	Location	Notes
Loss	14–10–1	Rayla Nascimento	Decision (unanimous)	Invicta FC 62	May 16, 2025	3	5:00	Kansas City, Missouri, United States	Catchweight (126.8 lb) bout; Bennett missed weight.
Win	14–9–1	Liz Tracy	Decision (unanimous)	Invicta FC 57	September 20, 2024	3	5:00	Kansas City, Kansas, United States	
Loss	13–9–1	Viviane Pereira	Submission (guillotine choke)	XFC: Detroit Grand Prix 2	May 31, 2024	1	1:50	Detroit, Michigan, United States	
Loss	13–8–1	Liz Carmouche	Submission (arm-triangle choke)	Bellator 294	April 21, 2023	4	4:29	Honolulu, Hawaii, United States	For the Bellator Women's Flyweight World Championship. Bennett missed weight (126.2 lb) and was ineligible to win the title.
Win	13–7–1	Justine Kish	Decision (unanimous)	Bellator 284	August 12, 2022	3	5:00	Sioux Falls, South Dakota, United States	Catchweight (128.4 lb) bout; Kish missed weight.
Win	12–7–1	Justine Kish	Decision (unanimous)	Bellator 274	February 19, 2022	3	5:00	Uncasville, Connecticut, United States	
Win	11–7–1	Alejandra Lara	Decision (unanimous)	Bellator 266	September 18, 2021	3	5:00	San Jose, California, United States	Catchweight (129.2 lb) bout; Bennett missed weight.
Loss	10–7–1	Liz Carmouche	Submission (rear-naked choke)	Bellator 246	September 12, 2020	3	3:17	Uncasville, Connecticut, United States	Catchweight (131.7 lb) bout; Bennett missed weight.
Loss	10–6–1	Miranda Maverick	Submission (neck crank)	Invicta FC Phoenix Series 2	September 6, 2019	3	3:38	Kansas City, Kansas, United States	Invicta FC Flyweight Tournament Final.
Loss	10–5–1	Karina Rodríguez	Decision (unanimous)	Invicta FC 35	June 7, 2019	3	5:00	Kansas City, Kansas, United States	
Win	10–4–1	Miranda Maverick	Decision (unanimous)	Invicta FC 34	February 15, 2019	3	5:00	Kansas City, Missouri, United States	
Loss	9–4–1	Kelly Kobold	Decision (unanimous)	Tuff-N-Uff: Fight Night	September 14, 2018	3	5:00	Las Vegas, Nevada, United States	
Win	9–3–1	Karina Rodríguez	Decision (split)	Invicta FC 28	March 24, 2018	3	5:00	Salt Lake City, Utah, United States	
Draw	8–3–1	Melinda Fábián	Draw (majority)	The Ultimate Fighter: A New World Champion Finale	December 1, 2017	3	5:00	Las Vegas, Nevada, United States	Return to Flyweight. Fábián was deducted one point in round 2 due to grabbing the fence.
Loss	8–3	Jodie Esquibel	Decision (split)	Invicta FC 22	March 25, 2017	3	5:00	Kansas City, Missouri, United States	
Loss	8–2	Roxanne Modafferi	Decision (split)	Invicta FC 16	March 11, 2016	3	5:00	Las Vegas, Nevada, United States	Flyweight bout.
Loss	8–1	Lívia Renata Souza	TKO (body kick and punches)	Invicta FC 15	January 16, 2016	1	1:30	Costa Mesa, California, United States	For the Invicta FC Strawweight Championship.
Win	8–0	Katja Kankaanpää	Decision (unanimous)	Invicta FC 14	September 12, 2015	3	5:00	Kansas City, Missouri, United States	
Win	7–0	Norma Rueda Center	Decision (unanimous)	Invicta FC 11	February 27, 2015	3	5:00	Los Angeles, California, United States	Strawweight debut.
Win	6–0	Jennifer Maia	Decision (unanimous)	Invicta FC 10	December 5, 2014	3	5:00	Houston, Texas, United States	
Win	5–0	Michelle Ould	TKO (body kick)	Invicta FC 8	September 6, 2014	2	1:34	Kansas City, Missouri, United States	Catchweight (131.9 lbs) bout; Ould missed weight.
Win	4–0	Colleen Schneider	Submission (rear-naked choke)	Showdown Fights 14	June 28, 2014	1	3:02	Orem, Utah, United States	Bantamweight bout.
Win	3–0	Sharon Jacobson	Submission (rear-naked choke)	Showdown Fights 13	January 24, 2014	1	2:12	Orem, Utah, United States	
Win	2–0	Julianna Peña	Decision (unanimous)	Showdown Fights 10	February 8, 2013	3	5:00	Orem, Utah, United States	Flyweight debut.
Win	1–0	Andrea Miller	TKO (punches)	Showdown Fights 6	February 24, 2012	1	2:41	Orem, Utah, United States	Bantamweight debut.

=== Mixed martial arts exhibition record ===
Exhibition record breakdown		
4 matches	3 wins	1 loss
By knockout	1	1
By submission	1	0
By decision	1	0

Res.	Record	Opponent	Method	Event	Date	Round	Time	Location	Notes
Win	3–1	Daiana Torquato	Submission (rear-naked choke)	Invicta FC Phoenix Series 2	September 6, 2019	1	3:34	Kansas City, Kansas, United States	Flyweight tournament semifinal bout.
Win	2–1	Liz Tracy	Decision (unanimous)	Invicta FC Phoenix Series 2	September 6, 2019	1	5:00	Kansas City, Kansas, United States	Flyweight tournament quarterfinal bout.
Loss	1–1	Sijara Eubanks	KO (head kick)	The Ultimate Fighter: A New World Champion	November 8, 2017 (air date)	1	1:25	Las Vegas, Nevada, United States	TUF 26 Quarter-final round
Win	1–0	Karine Gevorgyan	TKO (punches)	The Ultimate Fighter: A New World Champion	September 6, 2017 (air date)	1	3:11	Las Vegas, Nevada, United States	TUF 26 preliminary round

== See also ==
- List of female mixed martial artists
