= Bellator 274 =

Bellator mixed martial arts event in 2022

Bellator 274: Gracie vs. Storley
- The poster for Bellator 274: Gracie vs. Storley
- Promotion: Bellator MMA
- Date: February 19, 2022
- Venue: Mohegan Sun Arena
- City: Uncasville, Connecticut, United States

Event chronology
Bellator 273: Bader vs. Moldavsky	Bellator 274: Gracie vs. Storley	Bellator 275: Mousasi vs. Vanderford

Bellator 274: Gracie vs. Storley was a mixed martial arts event produced by Bellator MMA that took place on February 19, 2022, at the Mohegan Sun Arena in Uncasville, Connecticut.

== Background ==
No. 4-ranked Neiman Gracie took on No. 5-ranked Logan Storley in the main event in a clash of top-10 170-pounders. This marked the first time a non-title or non-grand prix tournament bout was five rounds in Bellator's history.

In the co-main bout former Bellator Welterweight Champion and No. 8-ranked Andrey Koreshkov was set to face Mukhamed Berkhamov. However, Berkhamov pulled out of the bout and was replaced by Chance Rencountre.

A women's flyweight bout between Veta Arteaga and Keri Taylor Melendez was scheduled for this event. However, the bout was scrapped for undisclosed reasons.

A light heavyweight bout between Christian Edwards and Kevin Haley was scheduled for this event. However, the bout was pulled after Edwards tested positive for COVID-19.

At the weigh-ins, Cody Herbert missed weight for his bout, weighing in at 188.6 pounds, 2.6 pounds over the middleweight non-title fight limit. The bout proceeded at catchweight and Herbert was fined a percentage of his purse, which went to his opponent Jordan Newman.

== Results ==
Main Card (Showtime)
Weight class				Method	Round	Time	Notes
Welterweight	Logan Storley	def.	Neiman Gracie	Decision (unanimous) (48–47, 50–45, 49–46)	5	5:00	(Note: First non-title, non-tournament Bellator main event scheduled for 5 rounds.)
Welterweight	Andrey Koreshkov	def.	Chance Rencountre	TKO (spinning body kick and punches)	1	0:38
Lightweight	Adam Piccolotti	def.	Georgi Karakhanyan	Decision (unanimous) (30–27, 29–28, 29–28)	3	5:00
Catchweight (175 lb)	Brennan Ward	def.	Brandon Bell	TKO (punches)	2	0:32
Heavyweight	Davion Franklin	def.	Said Sowma	Decision (split) (29–28, 28–29, 30–27)	3	5:00
Preliminary card (Youtube/Pluto TV)
Lightweight	Nick Browne	def.	Mandel Nallo	TKO (punches)	2	2:20
Bantamweight	Jaylon Bates	def.	Chris Disonell	Submission (rear-naked choke)	3	3:39
Lightweight	Bobby King	def.	Aviv Gozali	TKO (doctor stoppage)	1	5:00
Women's Flyweight	DeAnna Bennett	def.	Justine Kish	Decision (unanimous) (30–27, 30–26, 30–26)	3	5:00
Catchweight (188.6 lb)	Jordan Newman	def.	Cody Herbert	Decision (unanimous) (30–26, 30–27, 30–27)	3	5:00	(Note: Originally a middleweight bout; Herbert missed weight)
Lightweight	Justin Montalvo	def.	Corey Samuels	TKO (punches)	1	2:43
Featherweight	Isaiah Hokit	def.	Theodore Macuka	Technical Submission (rear-naked choke)	1	3:57
Welterweight	Jonathan DiLorenzo	def.	Orlando Mendoza	Submission (brabo choke)	1	1:07

== See also ==
- 2022 in Bellator MMA
- List of Bellator MMA events
- List of current Bellator fighters
