= Silvana Gómez Juárez =

Argentinian mixed martial arts fighter

- Born: December 6, 1984 (age 41); San Miguel de Tucumán, Argentina
- Other names: La Malvada
- Height: 5 ft 3 in (1.60 m)
- Weight: 115 lb (52 kg; 8 st 3 lb)
- Division: Strawweight; Flyweight
- Reach: 65 in (165 cm)
- Style: Kung Fu, Sanshou, Boxing
- Fighting out of: San Miguel de Tucumán, Argentina
- Team: Rogo Team (until 2019); Entram Gym (2019–present)
- Years active: 2010–present

Professional boxing record
- Total: 4
- Wins: 4
- By knockout: 2

Mixed martial arts record
- Total: 18
- Wins: 12
- By knockout: 8
- By submission: 2
- By decision: 2
- Losses: 6
- By knockout: 1
- By submission: 2
- By decision: 3

Other information
- Boxing record from BoxRec
- Mixed martial arts record from Sherdog

Silvana Gómez Juárez (born December 6, 1984) is an Argentinian mixed martial artist who competes in the Strawweight division. She has previously competed in the Ultimate Fighting Championship.

== Background ==
Gómez Juárez started training kung fu at the age of five due to the influence of her martial artist father, continuing to kickboxing, sanda and various other disciplines growing up. She also played rugby in Cardenales Rugby Club from where she was selected to play for the Argentina national rugby union team. She graduated from university with master's degree in physical education.

In 2019, she moved to Tijuana, Mexico to train at Entram Gym. She is also the first Argentine woman to appear in the UFC.

== Mixed martial arts career ==
=== Early career ===
Making her debut in 2010, travelling to Bueno Aires to challenge Ana Mancinelli at Real Fights 7. After winning the bout after her opponent decided to not continue after the first round, Gómez Juárez took a break from competing to attend university in San Miguel de Tucumán, competing only once more in 2012 winning the bout by TKO stoppage in the first round. She returned to active competition at the end of 2013, she went on to fight on the Brazilian regional scene, defeating future UFC fighter Vanessa Melo via unanimous decision, before Gómez Juárez faced Poliana Botelho for the vacant XFC Women's Flyweight belt at XFCi 11. Despite knocking down Botelho and nearly submitted her in the early rounds, Gómez Juárez went on to lose the fight after a doctor stoppage between rounds. After rebounding from the loss by winning via first round TKO stoppage in Argentina, Gómez Juárez faced Ariane Lipski for the KSW Women's Flyweight Championship on March 3, 2018 at KSW 42. She lost the bout via unanimous decision.

After losing the title fight, she was booked to face Antonina Shevchenko at Dana White's Tuesday Night Contender Series 11 on June 26, 2018. However, 8 days before the fight it was announced that Gómez Juárez was forced out of the bout with an undisclosed injury and was replaced by Jaimelene Nievera.

=== Ultimate Fighting Championship ===
After racking three straight wins in the regional circuit, she was booked to compete again at Dana White's Contender Series 43 against Maria Silva on October 12, 2021. However Gómez Juárez, as a replacement for Sam Hughes, made her UFC debut against Lupita Godinez on October 8, 2021 at UFC Fight Night: Dern vs. Rodriguez. She lost the bout via armbar in the first round.

Gómez Juárez, as a replacement for Ashley Yoder, was expected to face Vanessa Demopoulos on January 15, 2022 at UFC on ESPN: Kattar vs. Chikadze. The bout was pushed back to UFC 270 a few days before the event. She lost the bout via armbar in the first round.

Gómez Juárez faced Na Liang on June 11, 2022 at UFC 275. She won the bout via knockout in the first round. This win earned her the Performance of the Night award.

Gómez Juárez faced Karolina Kowalkiewicz on November 12, 2022, at UFC 281. She lost the fight via unanimous decision.

After the loss, it was announced that Gómez Juárez was no longer under contract with the UFC.

=== Budo Sento Championship ===
On August 2, 2024, Gómez Juárez faced Alejandra Lara for the vacant women's flyweight championship at Budo Sento Championship's BSC Vol. 24 event. She lost the fight via unanimous decision.

== Championships and achievements ==
- Ultimate Fighting Championship
  - Performance of the Night (One times) vs. Liang Na

== Mixed martial arts record ==
Professional record breakdown
18 matches	12 wins	6 losses
By knockout	8	1
By submission	2	2
By decision	2	3

Res.	Record	Opponent	Method	Event	Date	Round	Time	Location	Notes
Win	12–6	Nadia Vera	TKO (punches to the body)	Budo Sento Championship 29	May 30, 2025	4	1:36	Mexico City, Mexico	Won the BSC Women's Strawweight Championship.
Loss	11–6	Alejandra Lara	Decision (unanimous)	Budo Sento Championship 24	August 2, 2023	5	5:00	Mexico City, Mexico	For the vacant BSC Women's Flyweight Championship.
Loss	11–5	Karolina Kowalkiewicz	Decision (unanimous)	UFC 281	November 12, 2022	3	5:00	New York City, New York, United States	
Win	11–4	Liang Na	KO (punches)	UFC 275	June 11, 2022	1	1:22	Kallang, Singapore	Performance of the Night.
Loss	10–4	Vanessa Demopoulos	Submission (armbar)	UFC 270	January 22, 2022	1	2:25	Anaheim, California, United States	
Loss	10–3	Lupita Godinez	Submission (armbar)	UFC Fight Night: Dern vs. Rodriguez	October 9, 2021	1	4:14	Las Vegas, Nevada, United States	
Win	10–2	Gilsely Perea	TKO (punches)	UWC 25	February 26, 2021	2	3:53	Tijuana, Mexico	Flyweight bout.
Win	9–2	Diana Reyes	TKO (punches)	LUX 011	November 20, 2020	1	4:40	Monterrey, México	Catchweight (122 lb) bout.
Win	8–2	Saray Orozco	Decision (unanimous)	Combate 45	September 27, 2019	3	5:00	Guadalajara, México	Strawweight debut.
Loss	7–2	Ariane Lipski	Decision (unanimous)	KSW 42	March 3, 2018	5	5:00	Łódź, Poland	Return to Flyweight. For the KSW Women's Flyweight Championship.
Win	7–1	Maria Vega	TKO (punches)	Invictus Fighters 16	March 17, 2017	1	3:49	Salta, Argentina	Bantamweight debut.
Loss	6–1	Poliana Botelho	TKO (retirement)	XFC International 11	September 19, 2015	4	5:00	São Paulo, Brazil	For the vacant XFC Flyweight Championship.
Win	6–0	Vanessa Melo	Decision (unanimous)	XFC International 8	December 13, 2014	3	5:00	Campinas, Brazil	
Win	5–0	Mayerlin Rivas	Submission (armbar)	XFC International 5	June 7, 2014	3	2:55	São Paulo, Brazil	Won the XFCI Women's Flyweight Tournament.
Win	4–0	Bianca Daimoni	Submission (armbar)	XFC International 1	February 8, 2014	3	4:49	Osasco, Brazil	XFCI Women's Flyweight Tournament Semifinals.
Win	3–0	Susana Diaz	KO (punch)	Knock Out Club 12	December 13, 2013	1	3:15	Salta, Argentina	
Win	2–0	Angelica Lobos	TKO (punches)	Hombres de Honor 43	August 18, 2012	1	1:40	Santa Cruz, Argentina	
Win	1–0	Ana Mancinelli	TKO (retirement)	Real Fights 7	March 27, 2010	1	5:00	Buenos Aires, Argentina	Flyweight debut.

== Professional boxing record ==
4 fights	4 wins	0 losses
By knockout	2	0
By decision	2	0

No.	Result	Record	Opponent	Type	Round, time	Date	Location	Notes
4	Win	4–0	(Argentina) Paola Farfan	TKO	2 (4)	18 Nov 2017	Club Defensores de Villa Lujan, San Miguel de Tucumán, Argentina	
3	Win	3–0	(Argentina) Paola Farfan	UD	4	14 Jul 2017	Club Sociedad de Tiro y Gimnasia, San Pedro de Jujuy, Argentina	
2	Win	2–0	(Argentina) Valeria Vanesa Gramajo	MD	4	9 May 2014	Club del Maestro, Santiago del Estero, Argentina	
1	Win	1–0	(Argentina) Romina Mariela Arias	KO	1 (4)	13 Nov 2009	Club Almirante Brown, San Isidro de Lules, Argentina	

== See also ==
- List of male mixed martial artists
