= Jesse Delgado =

American wrestler and mixed martial arts fighter (born 1992)

- Delgado (left) after Big Ten Championship's in 2013

Personal information
- Born: Jesse Delgado; August 26, 1992 (age 34) Salinas, California, U.S.
- Home town: Gilroy, California, U.S.
- Height: 5 ft 5 in (1.65 m)
- Weight: 125 lb (57 kg)

Sport
- Sport: Folkstyle wrestling
- College team: Illinois
- Coached by: Jim Heffernan; Jeremy Hunter; Mark Perry
Medal record
Men's collegiate wrestling
Representing the Illinois Fighting Illini
NCAA Division I Championships
Gold medal – first place	2013 Des Moines	125 lb
Gold medal – first place	2014 Oklahoma City	125 lb
Big Ten Championships
Gold medal – first place	2013 Champaign	125 lb
Gold medal – first place	2014 Madison	125 lb

Jesse Delgado (born August 26, 1992) is an American mixed martial artist and folkstyle wrestler who was a two-time National Champion (2013, 2014) at the NCAA Division I Wrestling Championships. Delgado competed for the University of Illinois.

== Early life ==
Delgado, who is of Mexican American descent, was born August 26, 1992, in Salinas, California, to Jesus Delgado and Elizabeth Lopez. As a child Delgado moved to the city of Gilroy, California. Delgado started wrestling around the age of five, by suggestion of his father.

== High school career ==
Delgado was a California Interscholastic Federation (CIF) state champion at Gilroy High School, winning a title at 112 pounds. In total, he was a four-time state placer and one-time state champion at the CIF state championships. He placed third at 103 pounds as a freshman in 2007, third at 112 pounds as a sophomore in 2008, first at 112 pounds as a junior in 2009, and fourth at 125 pounds as a senior in 2010.

== College career ==
After his success at Gilroy High School he committed to California Polytechnic State University to wrestle in college. After assistant coach Mark Perry decided to take an assistant coaching position at the University of Illinois Delgado followed him by transferring there after his redshirt season. He later went on to win two national titles and two Big Ten titles at the 125 pound weight class. His freshman year he upset former and eventual national champion Matt McDonough in the first of many matches between the two of them.

=== 2010–2011 Redshirt Season ===
Delgado redshirted his true freshman year at California Polytechnic State University. He posted a 16–1 record with his lone loss coming to future two time All-American Ryan Mango. He ended the year winning the National Collegiate Open Wrestling Championship at 125 pounds.

=== 2011–2012 Freshman Year ===
Jesse Delgado's Redshirt-Freshman year at Illinois showed a lot of promise, as he went 34–7. He was third place at the Big Ten tournament, and 7th place at the national tournament at 125 pounds. Delgado upset three time finalist and two-time champion Matt McDonough of Iowa in their first meeting. The match was McDonough's lone loss on the season. He earned All-American honors by finishing 7th place at the NCAA Division I Wrestling Championships.

=== 2012–2013 Sophomore Year ===
Delgado finally emerged as a champion. He captured both the Big Ten Championship and the National Championship at 125 Pounds. Delgado capped off a tremendous 27–3 season by beating 2012 and 2010 champion Matt McDonough in the Big Ten finals, and 2012 runner-up Nico Megaludis in the finals of the NCAA Division I Wrestling Championships with a dramatic 3rd period cradle that lead to crucial back points to seal the victory (7-4). He became the first Fighting Illini National Champion since Matt Lackey (2003). He was also named Outstanding Wrestler of the Big Ten Championships.

=== 2013–2014 Junior Year ===
Delgado went on to repeat as National Champion at the 125 pound weight class. He went 30–2 on the season and repeated as Big Ten champion as well. He was the first back to back National Champion at Illinois in 56 years. He also led the team with 80 dual points scored on the season. And was named W.I.N. Magazine No. 1 ranked wrestler at 125 for ten consecutive weeks. He won both Big Ten's and Nationals in similar fashion with a 3–2 victory over 2013 runner-up Nico Megaludis in the Big Ten Finals, and a 3–2 victory over Nahshon Garrett in the finals of the NCAA Division I Wrestling Championships. Delgado was also named Fighting Illini Male Athlete of the Year.

=== 2014–2015 Senior Year ===
A significant shoulder injury kept Delgado out of action a majority of his senior season. He relied on toughness to qualify for nationals with a gutsy 4th-place finish at the Big Ten tournament. Delgado finished his season 10–5, and defeated 2013 All-American Tyler Cox in the first round of the NCAA Division I Wrestling Championships before suffering another injury. He finished his legendary career at Illinois with a record of (101-17), and achieved All-American status three times with 125 pound titles in 2013 and 2014, and a 7th-place finish in 2012.

After graduation he has opted to keep training at University of Illinois. He has also decided to chase his dream of being a mixed martial arts fighter after college.

== Personal life ==
Jesse has a son, Job (born 2020) with girlfriend, Gretchen Carr.

== Mixed martial arts career ==
Jesse Delgado
- Born: August 26, 1992 (age 34); Salinas, California, U.S.
- Height: 5 ft 5 in (1.65 m)
- Weight: 125 lb (57 kg)
- Division: Flyweight
- Style: Wrestling
- Fighting out of: Pittsburgh, Pennsylvania, U.S.
- Team: Valle Flow Striking (formerly)
- Years active: 2021–present (MMA)

Mixed martial arts record
- Total: 1
- Wins: 1
- By decision: 1
- Losses: 0

Other information
- Mixed martial arts record from Sherdog

Delgado made his MMA debut against Joshua Dillon on September 18, 2021, at Bellator 266. He won the bout via unanimous decision.

== Mixed martial arts record ==
Professional record breakdown
1 match	1 win	0 losses
By submission	0	0
By decision	1	0

Res.	Record	Opponent	Method	Event	Date	Round	Time	Location	Notes
Win	1–0	Joshua Dillon	Decision (unanimous)	Bellator 266	September 18, 2021	3	5:00	San Jose, California, United States	Catchweight (130 lb) bout.
