= Goiti Yamauchi =

Brazilian mixed martial artist

- Born: January 5, 1993 (age 33); Anjō, Aichi, Japan
- Native name: 山内ゴイチ
- Nationality: Brazilian
- Height: 5 ft 10 in (178 cm)
- Weight: 170 lb (77 kg; 12 st 2 lb)
- Division: Featherweight (145 lb); Lightweight (155 lb); Welterweight (170 lb)
- Reach: 74 in (188 cm)
- Style: Brazilian Jiu-Jitsu, Muay Thai, Kickboxing, Boxing
- Fighting out of: Curitiba, Paraná, Brazil
- Team: Yamauchi Team; Academia Arena
- Rank: Black belt in Brazilian jiu-jitsu under Fernandinho Vieira
- Years active: 2008–present

Kickboxing record
- Total: 7
- Wins: 7
- By knockout: 7
- Losses: 0

Mixed martial arts record
- Total: 38
- Wins: 31
- By knockout: 4
- By submission: 22
- By decision: 5
- Losses: 7
- By knockout: 1
- By decision: 6

Amateur boxing record
- Total: 5
- Wins: 5

Other information
- Mixed martial arts record from Sherdog

Goiti Yamauchi (山内ゴイチ, Yamauchi Goichi; born January 5, 1993) is a Brazilian mixed martial artist who competed in the Welterweight division for Bellator MMA and currently competes in the same division for the Professional Fighters League.

== Background ==
Yamauchi was born in Anjō, Aichi to a Japanese father and a Japanese-Brazilian mother, but his family moved to Curitiba, Paraná when he was 3 years old. He started in Brazilian jiu-jitsu at the age of 9, followed by Muay Thai, boxing and wrestling during his youth. At the age of 14, he became Paraná State's amateur boxing champion in 2007, defeating then-reigning champion John Lineker, who was 17.

== Mixed martial arts career ==
=== Early career ===
Before moving to professional mixed martial arts, Yamauchi scored seven wins as an amateur, with seven first-round stoppages. Yamauchi started his professional career in 2010, when he was just 17 years old. From October 2010 to May 2013, he fought for many organizations throughout Brazil and won a featherweight title and a featherweight tournament in Iron Fight Combat and Smash Fight respectively.

In January 2013, it was announced that Yamauchi signed a multi-fight contract with Bellator MMA.

=== Bellator MMA ===
Yamauchi made his promotional debut against fellow promotional newcomer Musa Toliver on September 13, 2013 at Bellator 99. He won via submission due to a rear-naked choke early in the first round.

In his second fight for the promotion, Yamauchi faced Saul Almeida on November 22, 2013 at Bellator 109. He won via knockout in the first round.

Yamauchi faced Will Martinez in the quarterfinal match of Bellator season ten featherweight tournament on February 28, 2014 at Bellator 110. He lost the fight via unanimous decision.

Yamauchi faced Mike Richman on May 17, 2014 at Bellator 120. He won the back-and-forth fight via unanimous decision.

Yamauchi faced Martin Stapleton on September 19, 2014 at Bellator 125. He won via submission in the first round.

Yamauchi was expected to face former Bellator Featherweight Champion Pat Curran at Bellator 139 on June 26, 2015. However, Yamauchi pulled out of the fight due to injury and was replaced by Emmanuel Sanchez.

Yamauchi faced Isao Kobayashi at Bellator 144 on October 23, 2015. Yamauchi dominated the fight on the ground for the first two rounds, before defeating his opponent via submission in the third, after dropping Kobayashi with a punch and securing a rear-naked choke. With the win, Yamauchi became the first to finish Isao Yobayashi.

Yamauchi next faced fellow prospect, Bubba Jenkins, at Bellator 151 on March 4, 2016. Early in the first round, Yamauchi was able to secure Jenkins' back standing, remaining there for rest of the round. However, in the next two rounds, Jenkins utilised his superior wrestling to take Yamauchi down and control the fight en route to a unanimous verdict.

==== Move up to lightweight division ====
Yamauchi faced Ryan Couture at Bellator 162 on October 21, 2016. He won the fight via submission just over a minute into the first round and became the first fighter to submit Couture.

Yamauchi faced Valeriu Mircea at Bellator 168 on December 10, 2016. After a near knockout loss, Yamauchi defeated Mircea via a triangle choke submission in the first round.

Yamauchi faced Adam Piccolotti at Bellator 183 on September 23, 2017. He won the fight via submission in the first round.

Yamauchi next faced Michael Chandler at Bellator 192 on January 20, 2018. He lost the fight by unanimous decision.

Yamauchi faced Saad Awad at Bellator 229 on October 4, 2019. He won the fight via a verbal submission due to an armbar in the first round.

Yamauchi faced Daron Cruickshank at Bellator & Rizin: Japan on December 29, 2019. He won the fight via a rear-naked choke submission in the first round.

Yamauchi was next expected to face PFL veteran Nate Andrews at Bellator 254 on December 10, 2020. However at weigh ins, Goiti weighed in at 162.8 lbs, 6.8 lbs over the lightweight limit. Mohegan Sun commission head, Mike Mazzulli, said that from now on Yamauchi will be required to fight at Welterweight, 170 lbs.

Yamauchi faced Dan Moret on April 9, 2021 at Bellator 256. He lost the bout via a controversial split decision, where 9/9 media members scored the fight for Yamauchi.

Yamauchi faced Chris Gonzalez on July 31, 2021 at Bellator 263. He won the bout via TKO in the first round, only the second knockout win in Goiti's career.

Yamauchi was scheduled to face Derek Anderson on March 12, 2022 at Bellator 276. The week of the event, the bout was scrapped for unknown reasons.

==== Move up to welterweight ====
Moving up to Welterweight, Yamauchi faced Levan Chokheli on April 23, 2022 at Bellator 279. He won the bout via armbar in the first round.

Yamauchi headlined Bellator 284 on August 12, 2022 against fellow BJJ expert Neiman Gracie. He won the bout in the second round after knocking out Gracie with an uppercut.

Yamauchi faced Michael Page on March 10, 2023 at Bellator 292. He lost the bout 26 seconds into the bout after a leg kick ruptured his patella tendon.

=== Professional Fighter's League ===
In his PFL debut, Yamauchi faced Neiman Gracie in a rematch at PFL 3 on April 19, 2024. He won the bout via unanimous decision.

Yamauchi next faced Andrey Koreshkov at PFL 6 (2024) on June 28, 2024, losing the fight via unanimous decision.

== Championships and accomplishments ==
=== Mixed martial arts ===
- Bellator MMA
  - Most submission wins in Bellator MMA history (nine)
  - Tied for most submission wins in Bellator Lightweight division history (five)
  - First fighter in Bellator MMA history to earn wins in three weight classes
  - First fighter in Bellator MMA history to earn stoppages in three weight classes
- Iron Fight Combat
  - Iron Fight Combat featherweight title (One time)
- Smash Fight
  - Smash Fight featherweight tournament winner (2013)

=== Amateur boxing ===
- Paraná State Amateur Boxing Championship (2007)

== Mixed martial arts record ==
Professional record breakdown
38 matches	31 wins	7 losses
By knockout	4	1
By submission	22	0
By decision	5	6

Res.	Record	Opponent	Method	Event	Date	Round	Time	Location	Notes
Win	31–7	Shogo Sato	Submission (rear-naked choke)	Pancrase 360	December 21, 2025	2	1:47	Tachikawa, Japan	Won the Pancrase Welterweight Championship.
Win	30–7	Yura Naito	KO (punches)	Pancrase 353	April 27, 2025	1	1:10	Tokyo, Japan	
Loss	29–7	Andrey Koreshkov	Decision (unanimous)	PFL 6 (2024)	June 28, 2024	3	5:00	Sioux Falls, South Dakota, United States	
Win	29–6	Neiman Gracie	Decision (unanimous)	PFL 3 (2024)	April 19, 2024	3	5:00	Chicago, Illinois, United States	
Loss	28–6	Michael Page	TKO (leg kick)	Bellator 292	March 10, 2023	1	0:26	San Jose, California, United States	
Win	28–5	Neiman Gracie	KO (punches)	Bellator 284	August 12, 2022	2	3:58	Sioux Falls, South Dakota, United States	
Win	27–5	Levan Chokheli	Submission (armbar)	Bellator 279	April 23, 2022	1	3:49	Honolulu, Hawaii, United States	Welterweight debut.
Win	26–5	Chris Gonzalez	TKO (punches)	Bellator 263	July 30, 2021	1	3:53	Los Angeles, California, United States	
Loss	25–5	Dan Moret	Decision (split)	Bellator 256	April 9, 2021	3	5:00	Uncasville, Connecticut, United States	
Win	25–4	Daron Cruickshank	Submission (rear-naked choke)	Bellator & Rizin: Japan	December 29, 2019	1	3:11	Saitama, Japan	Catchweight (157.8 lb) bout; Yamauchi missed weight.
Win	24–4	Saad Awad	Verbal submission (armbar)	Bellator 229	October 4, 2019	1	1:40	Temecula, California, United States	
Win	23–4	Daniel Weichel	Decision (split)	Bellator 210	November 30, 2018	3	5:00	Thackerville, Oklahoma, United States	
Loss	22–4	Michael Chandler	Decision (unanimous)	Bellator 192	January 20, 2018	3	5:00	Inglewood, California, United States	
Win	22–3	Adam Piccolotti	Submission (rear-naked choke)	Bellator 183	September 24, 2017	1	3:19	San Jose, California, United States	
Win	21–3	Valeriu Mircea	Submission (triangle choke)	Bellator 168	December 10, 2016	1	3:33	Florence, Italy	
Win	20–3	Ryan Couture	Submission (armbar)	Bellator 162	October 21, 2016	1	1:01	Memphis, Tennessee, United States	Lightweight debut.
Loss	19–3	Bubba Jenkins	Decision (unanimous)	Bellator 151	March 4, 2016	3	5:00	Thackerville, Oklahoma, United States	
Win	19–2	Isao Kobayashi	Submission (rear-naked choke)	Bellator 144	October 23, 2015	3	3:50	Uncasville, Connecticut, United States	
Win	18–2	Martin Stapleton	Submission (rear-naked choke)	Bellator 125	September 19, 2014	1	4:37	Fresno, California, United States	Catchweight (148 lb) bout; Stapleton missed weight.
Win	17–2	Mike Richman	Decision (unanimous)	Bellator 120	May 17, 2014	3	5:00	Southaven, Mississippi, United States	
Loss	16–2	Will Martinez	Decision (unanimous)	Bellator 110	February 28, 2014	3	5:00	Uncasville, Connecticut, United States	Bellator Season 10 Featherweight Tournament Quarterfinal.
Win	16–1	Saul Almeida	KO (punches)	Bellator 109	November 22, 2013	1	2:04	Bethlehem, Pennsylvania, United States	Catchweight (152.3 lb) bout; Yamauchi missed weight.
Win	15–1	Musa Toliver	Submission (rear-naked choke)	Bellator 99	September 13, 2013	1	1:01	Temecula, California, United States	
Win	14–1	Sergio Silva Rodrigues	Submission (rear-naked choke)	Smash Fight 1	May 3, 2013	1	3:38	Curitiba, Brazil	Won the Smash Fight Featherweight Tournament.
Win	13–1	Diego Marlon	Submission (armbar)	Smash Fight 1	May 3, 2013	1	2:54	Curitiba, Brazil	Smash Fight Featherweight Tournament Semifinal.
Win	12–1	Jurandir Sardinha	Decision (unanimous)	Iron Fight Combat 3	March 23, 2013	3	5:00	Feira de Santana, Brazil	Won the Iron FC Featherweight Championship.
Win	11–1	José Ivanildo Lopes	Decision (unanimous)	Iron Fight Combat 2	December 7, 2012	3	5:00	Aracaju, Brazil	
Win	10–1	Gustavo Wurlitzer	Submission (rear-naked choke)	Power Fight Extreme 8	September 22, 2012	1	1:19	Curitiba, Brazil	
Win	9–1	Dymitry Damiani	Submission (rear-naked choke)	Iron Fight Combat 1	September 1, 2012	1	1:40	Feira de Santana, Brazil	
Win	8–1	Juliano Wandalen	Submission (rear-naked choke)	Shooto Brazil 31	June 29, 2012	1	0:56	Brasília, Brazil	
Win	7–1	Edenilson Junior	Submission (rear-naked choke)	Nitrix Champion Fight 9	December 10, 2011	1	1:02	Itajaí, Brazil	
Win	6–1	Jonathan José de Faria	Submission (armbar)	Brave FC: Gold Edition	November 5, 2011	1	1:02	Curitiba, Brazil	
Loss	5–1	Rodrigo Cavalheiro Correia	Decision (unanimous)	Adventure Fighters Tournament 1	October 15, 2011	3	5:00	Curitiba, Brazil	
Win	5–0	Tiago Sartori	Submission (rear-naked choke)	Capital Fight 4	September 6, 2011	2	1:41	Brasília, Brazil	
Win	4–0	Arivaldo Lima Silva	Submission (armbar)	Brazilian Fight League 12	August 13, 2011	1	2:56	Curitiba, Brazil	
Win	3–0	Alessandro Martins	Submission (rear-naked choke)	Brave FC: Tryouts	April 30, 2011	1	1:29	Curitiba, Brazil	
Win	2–0	Eduardo Wellington	Submission	Brazilian Fight League: Fight Night 1	April 8, 2011	1	N/A	Curitiba, Brazil	
Win	1–0	Andre Pedroso	Submission (rear-naked choke)	Gladiators FC 2	October 16, 2010	2	0:31	Curitiba, Brazil	Featherweight debut.

== See also ==
- List of current Bellator fighters
- List of male mixed martial artists
