= Bellator 264 =

Bellator mixed martial arts event in 2021

Bellator 264: Mousasi vs. Salter
- The poster for Bellator 264: Mousasi vs. Salter
- Promotion: Bellator MMA
- Date: August 13, 2021
- Venue: Mohegan Sun Arena
- City: Uncasville, Connecticut, United States

Event chronology
Bellator 263: Pitbull vs. McKee	Bellator 264: Mousasi vs. Salter	Bellator 265: Kongo vs. Kharitonov

Bellator 264: Mousasi vs. Salter was a mixed martial arts event produced by Bellator MMA that took place on August 13, 2021 at the Mohegan Sun Arena in Uncasville, Connecticut.

== Background ==
Current Bellator Middleweight World Champion Gegard Mousasi made his first title defense against #1 ranked John Salter. Most recently, Mousasi defeated former Bellator Welterweight World Champion Douglas Lima, clearing his path to a shot at a second middleweight title run. Salter entered his title shot riding a three-fight winning streak with victories over Chidi Njokuani, Andrew Kapel and Mousasi’s teammate Costello van Steenis. He entered the title bout winning six of his eight Bellator victories via submission.

Former Bellator welterweight champion Andrey Koreshkov returned to the promotion to face Sabah Homasi in a welterweight bout. It was Koreshkov's first appearance with the promotion since October 2019.

Two ranked bantamweights, the #3 ranked Magomed Magomedov and #4 ranked Raufeon Stots, were scheduled to compete at Bellator 263. On July 19, it was announced that the bout was scratched from the event and was rescheduled for this event.

A heavyweight bout between two undefeated fighters, Davion Franklin and Everett Cummings, was announced for the event's main card.

A middleweight bout between Ty Gwerder and Khadzhimurat Bestaev was the opening fight of the main card.

Former Invicta FC featherweight champion Pam Sorenson made her Bellator debut against fellow promotional newcomer Roberta Samad in the featured preliminary bout.

A heavyweight bout between #6 ranked Steve Mowry and Marcelo Golm was scheduled for this event. However, on August 4 it was announced that Steve Mowry was scratched from the bout, with Golm now facing Kelvin Tiller on August 20 at Bellator 265.

Danny Sabatello was expected to face the 34-fight veteran Johnny Campbell in a bantamweight bout. However, the bout between Sabatello and Campbell and a featherweight bout between James Adcock and Nekruz Mirkhojaev scheduled for this event were both cancelled during fight week due to health and safety protocols, with Sabatello being confirmed to have tested positive for COVID-19.

A lightweight bout between Justin Montalvo and Kendly St. Louis was cancelled by the Mohegan Tribe director of athletic regulation after St. Louis came in at 162.5 pounds, missing weight by 6.5 pounds (including the one-pound allowance for non-title bouts).

== Results ==
Main Card (Showtime)
Weight class				Method	Round	Time	Notes
Middleweight	Gegard Mousasi (c)	def.	John Salter	TKO (punches)	3	2:07	(Note: For the Bellator Middleweight World Championship.)
Welterweight	Andrey Koreshkov	def.	Sabah Homasi	Decision (unanimous) (30–27, 30–26, 30–26)	3	5:00
Bantamweight	Raufeon Stots	def.	Magomed Magomedov	Decision (unanimous) (29–28, 30–27, 30–27)	3	5:00
Heavyweight	Davion Franklin	def.	Everett Cummings	TKO (punches)	1	0:21
Middleweight	Khadzhimurat Bestaev	def.	Ty Gwerder	Decision (unanimous) (29–28, 29–28, 29–28)	3	5:00
Preliminary card (Youtube/Pluto TV)
Women's Featherweight	Pam Sorenson	def.	Roberta Samad	Decision (split) (28–29, 29–28, 29–28)	3	5:00
Catchweight (142 lb)	Jeffrey Glossner	def.	Sebastian Ruiz	Decision (unanimous) (29–28, 29–28, 29–28)	3	5:00
Catchweight (195 lb)	Jon McNeil	def.	Orlando Mendoza	TKO (punches)	3	3:57

== See also ==
- 2021 in Bellator MMA
- List of Bellator MMA events
- List of current Bellator fighters
