= Bellator 263 =

Bellator mixed martial arts event in 2021

Bellator 263: Pitbull vs. McKee
- The poster for Bellator 263: Pitbull vs. McKee
- Promotion: Bellator MMA
- Date: July 31, 2021
- Venue: The Forum
- City: Inglewood, California, United States

Event chronology
Bellator 262: Velasquez vs. Kielholtz	Bellator 263: Pitbull vs. McKee	Bellator 264: Mousasi vs. Salter

Bellator 263: Pitbull vs. McKee was a mixed martial arts event produced by Bellator MMA that took place on July 31, 2021, at The Forum in Inglewood, California. The event marked Bellator's first outside of the Mohegan Sun bubble and the first Bellator show on the road.

== Background ==
The event was headlined by the final of the Bellator Featherweight World Grand Prix between the current champion Patrício Pitbull and undefeated A. J. McKee, where winner will also win $1 million prize. Pitbull is the current Bellator Lightweight and Featherweight Champion, who is currently on a seven-fight winning streak and hasn't lost since August 2016. He defeated Emmanuel Sanchez via a first-round guillotine choke in their rematch at Bellator 255. McKee is undefeated as a pro at 17-0 and is also coming off of first-round submission of his own in his last fight, defeating Darrion Caldwell with a neck crank at Bellator 253.

A featherweight bout between Mads Burnell and Emmanuel Sanchez was scheduled as the co-main event.

A lightweight bout between Manny Muro and the undefeated Usman Nurmagomedov was scheduled for the event main card.

A lightweight bout between Islam Mamedov and former Bellator lightweight champion Brent Primus was scheduled as the main card opener.

Two ranked bantamweights, the #3 ranked Magomed Magomedov and #4 ranked Raufeon Stots, were scheduled to compete at the event. On July 19, it was announced that the bout was scratched from the event and was rescheduled for Bellator 264.

A women's flyweight bout between Alejandra Lara and DeAnna Bennett was scheduled to take place at this event. The bout was rescheduled for unknown reasons to take place on August 20, 2021, at Bellator 265.

A lightweight bout between Georgi Karakhanyan and Kiefer Crosbie was scheduled for the event prelims.

Two additional bouts were announced for the event prelims on July 6, 2021: a lightweight bout between Chris Gonzalez and Goiti Yamauchi, as well as a welterweight bout between Johnny Cisneros and Joshua Jones.

A bantamweight bout between Brian Moore and Jared Scoggins was scheduled for this event. However, on July 25, it was announced Scoggins had tested positive for COVID-19 and was replaced by promotional newcomer Jordan Winski.

A 190-pound contract weight fight between Justin Barry and Daniel Compton was to take place at the event, however Barry did not receive medical clearance from the California State Athletic Commission (CSAC) at weigh-ins, leading to the bout being cancelled. Compton was paid his show money.

== Results ==
Main Card (Showtime)
Weight class				Method	Round	Time	Notes
Featherweight	A. J. McKee	def.	Patrício Pitbull (c)	Technical Submission (guillotine choke)	1	1:57	(Note: Bellator Featherweight World Grand Prix Final bout for the Bellator Featherweight World Championship and $1 million dollar prize.)
Featherweight	Mads Burnell	def.	Emmanuel Sanchez	Decision (unanimous) (29–28, 30–27, 30–27)	3	5:00
Lightweight	Usman Nurmagomedov	def.	Manny Muro	TKO (knee to the body)	1	3:30
Lightweight	Islam Mamedov	def.	Brent Primus	Decision (split) (29–28, 28–29, 29–28)	3	5:00
Lightweight	Goiti Yamauchi	def.	Chris Gonzalez	TKO (punches)	1	3:53
Preliminary card (Youtube/Pluto TV)
Women's Flyweight	Vanessa Porto	def.	Ilara Joanne	Decision (split) (29–28, 28–29, 29–28)	3	5:00
Catchweight (150 lb)	Gadzhi Rabadanov	def.	Daniel Carey	KO (punch)	1	3:57
Featherweight	Khasan Magomedsharipov	def.	Jonathan Quiroz	TKO (punches)	2	4:21
Catchweight (180 lb)	Joshua Jones	def.	Johnny Cisneros	TKO (punches)	2	4:15
Lightweight	Georgi Karakhanyan	def.	Kiefer Crosbie	Submission (arm-triangle choke)	1	4:25
Bantamweight	Brian Moore	def.	Jordan Winski	Decision (unanimous) (30–27, 30–26, 30–26)	3	5:00

== Reported payout ==
The following is the reported payout to the fighters as reported to the California State Athletic Commission. The amounts do not include sponsor money, discretionary bonuses, viewership points, or additional earnings. The total disclosed payout for the event was $2,094,000.

MAIN CARD (10 p.m. E.T., Showtime)

- A.J. McKee ($150,000/$1,000,000) def. Patricio Freire: ($250,000/$1,000,000)
- Mads Burnell ($26,000/$26,000) def. Emmanuel Sanchez ($61,000/$61,000)
- Usman Nurmagomedov ($30,000/$30,000) def. Manny Muro ($26,000/$0)
- Islam Mamedov ($10,000/$10,000) def. Brent Primus ($50,000/$0)
- Goiti Yamauchi ($32,000/$32,000) def. Chris Gonzalez ($31,000/$31,000)

PRELIMS (7 p.m. E.T., YouTube/PlutoTV)

- Vanessa Porto ($15,000/$15,000) def. Ilara Joanne ($13,000/$13,000)
- Gadzhi Rabadanov ($25,000/$25,000) def. Daniel Carey ($10,000/$10,000)
- Khasan Magomedsharipov ($25,000/$0) def. Jonathan Quiroz ($10,000/$10,000)
- Joshua Jones ($4,000/$4,000) def. Johnny Cisneros ($4,000/$4,000)
- Georgi Karakhanyan ($70,000/$0) def. Kiefer Crosbie ($50,000/$0)
- Brian Moore ($25,000/$25,000) def. Jordan Winski ($10,000/$10,000)

== See also ==
- 2021 in Bellator MMA
- List of Bellator MMA events
- List of current Bellator fighters
