= Joe Warren (fighter) =

American sport wrestler and mixed martial artist

- Born: Joseph Ryan Warren; October 31, 1976 (age 49); Grand Rapids, Michigan, U.S.
- Other names: The Baddest Man on the Planet
- Height: 5 ft 6 in (168 cm)
- Weight: 135 lb (61 kg; 9 st 9 lb)
- Division: Bantamweight (2012–present); Featherweight (2009–2012)
- Reach: 69 in (175 cm)
- Style: Greco-Roman wrestling, Boxing
- Stance: Orthodox
- Fighting out of: Denver, Colorado, U.S.
- Team: Factory X
- Wrestling: NCAA Division I Wrestling
- Years active: 2009–2018

Mixed martial arts record
- Total: 23
- Wins: 15
- By knockout: 3
- By submission: 2
- By decision: 10
- Losses: 8
- By knockout: 3
- By submission: 3
- By decision: 2

Other information
- University: University of Michigan
- Spouse: Christy Cech
- Children: 2
- Notable club: The New York Athletic Club
- Notable school: East Kentwood High School
- Mixed martial arts record from Sherdog

Joseph Ryan Warren (born October 31, 1976) is an American Greco-Roman wrestler and mixed martial artist who most recently competed for Bellator MMA. In Bellator, Warren became the first fighter in the promotion's history to become world champion in 2 divisions, winning the Bellator Featherweight World Championship in 2010 and the Bantamweight World Championship in 2014. As a Greco-Roman wrestler, he won the 2006 Pan American and the 2006 World Championship. He later participated in and won the Gold Medal at the 2007 World Cup.

During the end of 2008 Warren started transitioning to mixed martial arts, and on March 8, 2009, he made his professional debut. He competed for Bellator MMA, and Dream in Japan. He is a former Bellator Bantamweight Champion and former Bellator Featherweight Champion.

== Greco-Roman wrestling career ==
Warren practiced freestyle wrestling before switching to Greco-Roman. He began his career at East Kentwood High School in Kentwood, Michigan, where he placed three times in MHSAA Division One, winning a state championship his senior year. He wrestled collegiatly for the University of Michigan, where he was an NCAA wrestling All-American.

He won the 60 kilograms (130 lb) division of men's Greco-Roman wrestling at the 2006 FILA Wrestling World Championships. Other accomplishments include 6th at the 2000 World University Championship at 63 kilograms (139 lb), 9th at the 2005 FILA Wrestling World Championships, 1st at the 2006 Pan American Championship and 1st at the 2007 World Cup, all at 60 kg. In 2007 he missed the Pan American Games at Rio de Janeiro because of positive test for cannabis. In 2008 he got a two years ban from international wrestling competition and missed the 2008 Summer Olympics.

On December 18, 2010, it was reported that Warren would be making a return to wrestling, to try to qualify for the 2012 Summer Olympics in London. Warren would lose at the 2012 U.S. Olympic Trials, but would serve as a training partner/coach for the U.S. at the 2012 Olympic Games.

== Mixed martial arts career ==
=== DREAM ===
Joe Warren started a transition to MMA in 2008 and joined up with Team Quest where he got to train with fellow Greco-Roman wrestler and Pride Fighting Championship Champion Dan Henderson. His MMA debut was on March 8, 2009, at Dream.7, where he defeated former WEC Bantamweight Champion Chase Beebe by TKO (doctor stoppage) after the first round due to a cut Beebe received over his right eye. In the second round of the tournament, at Dream.9 on May 26, 2009, he was matched up with and defeated former K-1 Hero's Lightweight Grand Prix Champion, and formerly 17–1, Norifumi Yamamoto in his first fight after a 512-day layoff officially due to elbow and knee injuries. In preparation for the bout Warren trained with former WEC Featherweight Champion Urijah Faber and his Team Alpha Male after Faber called Warren and told him he knew how to defeat Yamamoto. Faber had previously prepared Joseph Benavidez to fight Yamamoto in July 2008, but the fight did not happen as Yamamoto pulled out three days before the fight. Warren's fight happened as planned though, and after going the allotted 15 minutes Warren was awarded a split decision victory.

The final two rounds of the tournament took place at Dream 11 which took place on October 6, 2009. In his scheduled semi-final bout Warren fought Brazilian jiu-jitsu expert Bibiano Fernandes, where he quickly lost due to a controversial first-round armbar after securing a takedown.

=== Bellator Fighting Championships ===
==== 2010 ====
On February 1, 2010, Warren officially announced that he signed with Bellator Fighting Championships, and that he would compete in the Featherweight tournament during Bellator's Season 2.

At Bellator 13, Warren fought in a quarter-final bout against Eric Marriott. Warren dominated the fight with his wrestling and took the fight on all three judges score cards, giving him the unanimous decision win. Warren advanced to the semi-final round where he defeated Georgi Karakhanyan via unanimous decision at Bellator 18.

On June 24, 2010, Warren won the Bellator featherweight tournament by claiming a split-decision over Patricio Freire. Joe was both dropped and caught in a rear-naked choke in the first round. He came back in rounds 2 and 3 by scoring takedowns followed by a ground and pound attack. The official scores were (29–28), (28–29), and (29–28). After the fight, Bellator Fighting Championships Featherweight Champion Joe Soto came into the ring and the two exchanged words, with Warren telling Soto "you've got my belt" and Soto promising to hold onto the title.

The title fight took place on September 2, 2010, at Bellator 27 in the third season of Bellator Fighting Championships. This was Warren's first title shot. Following a dominant opening round by Soto, Warren won the fight via KO (strikes) in the opening minute of the second round to become the new Bellator Featherweight champion.

==== 2011 ====
Warren faced Marcos Galvão in a non-title fight on April 16, 2011, at Bellator 41. In the fight Galvão negated a majority of Warren's offense for the first two rounds by showing strong takedown defense, taking down Warren multiple times, taking Warren's back, and executing good knees from the clinch. In the third round he was taken down by Warren and controlled throughout the round. At the end of the fight, Bellator color commentator, Jimmy Smith, believed Galvão won the fight 29–28. Along with Smith, many top MMA sites, (MMAJunkie, Sherdog, MMAFighting, MMASpot), all believed that Galvão won the fight by 29–28. It was then announced that Warren had won the fight via unanimous decision (30–27, 29–28, 29–28).

Warren was expected to put his title on the line versus Patricio Freire at Bellator 47 on July 23, 2011, but had to be postponed due to Pitbull's unexpected injury.

In the fall of 2011, Warren was entered the Bellator Season 5 bantamweight tournament. He was hoping to become the promotion's first two division champion. Warren faced fellow amateur wrestling world champion, Alexis Vila, at Bellator 51, in the quarterfinal round of Bellator's season five bantamweight tournament. He lost the fight via KO in the first round.

==== 2012 ====
Warren fought Pat Curran on March 9, 2012, at Bellator 60 in the first defense of his Bellator Featherweight Championship. He lost the fight via KO in the third round.

After losing the title, Warren returned and faced Owen Evinger on November 9, 2012, at Bellator 80. He won the fight via unanimous decision.

==== 2013 ====
On February 5, 2013, it was announced that Warren would be one of the four coaches to appear on the promotion's reality series titled Fight Master: Bellator MMA.

Joe Warren was set to fight Nick Kirk at Bellator 98 in the semifinal match of Bellator season nine bantamweight tournament, however he was not cleared to fight because he was knocked out in a sparring session prior to the fight. The fight was then rescheduled for Bellator 101 on September 27, 2013. Warren won via submission in the second round.

Warren faced Travis Marx in the finals on November 8, 2013, at Bellator 107. He won via TKO in the second round to win the Bellator season nine Bantamweight tournament.

==== 2014 ====
Warren was scheduled to face Bellator Bantamweight champion Eduardo Dantas at Bellator 118. However, on April 26, 2014, it was revealed that Dantas was injured head and withdrew from the fight. Warren was to face Rafael Silva in an Interim Bantamweight title fight. Silva, however, missed weight and the promotion made the interim title available only if Warren were to win. Warren won the fight via unanimous decision to become the Bellator Interim Bantamweight champion.

Warren faced Eduardo Dantas in a title unification bout on October 10, 2014, at Bellator 128. He won the fight via unanimous decision to become the undisputed Bellator Bantamweight Champion.

==== 2015 ====
Warren made his first bantamweight title defense against Marcos Galvão in a rematch on March 27, 2015, at Bellator 135. He lost the fight and the title via verbal submission due to a kneebar in the second round.

Warren faced WEC and Bellator veteran L.C. Davis in the main event of Bellator 143 on September 25, 2015. He won the fight via unanimous decision.

==== 2016 ====
Warren next faced undefeated prospect Darrion Caldwell in a title eliminator in the main event at Bellator 151 on March 4, 2016. He lost the fight via technical submission due to a rear-naked choke in the first round.

Warren faced Sirwan Kakai at Bellator 161 on September 16, 2016. He won the fight via guillotine choke submission in the third round.

Warren faced Eduardo Dantas in a rematch at Bellator 166 on December 2, 2016, for the Bellator bantamweight championship. He lost the fight via majority decision.

==== 2017 ====
Warren faced prospect Steve Garcia at Bellator 181 on July 14, 2017. He won the fight by unanimous decision.

==== 2018 ====
Warren faced Joe Taimanglo at Bellator 195 on March 2, 2018. He lost the fight via split decision.

Warren next faced Shawn Bunch on November 30, 2018, at Bellator 210. He lost the bout via first round technical knockout.

==== Departure ====
After 2 years of inactivity, Bellator MMA announced on October 27, 2020, that Warren had been released from the promotion.

== Personal life ==
Warren and his wife have a son who was born July 5, 2008 and a girl, Maddox Reese Warren, who was born March 4, 2010.

== Championships and accomplishments ==
=== Mixed martial arts ===
- Bellator Fighting Championships
  - Bellator Featherweight World Championship (One time)
  - Bellator Bantamweight World Championship (One time)
  - Interim Bellator Bantamweight Championship (One time)
  - Bellator Season 2 Featherweight Tournament Championship
  - Bellator Season 9 Bantamweight Tournament Championship
  - First fighter to hold Championships in multiple weight classes
  - Oldest Fighter to win a championship in Bellator History (37 years and 362 days)
  - Most decision wins in Bellator History (8)
- DREAM
  - DREAM 2009 Featherweight Grand Prix Semifinalist
- FIGHT! Magazine
  - 2009 Upset of the Year vs. Norifumi Yamamoto on May 26
- Fight Matrix
  - 2009 Rookie of the Year

=== Professional wrestling ===
- Real Pro Wrestling
  - RPW Season One 132 lb Championship Semifinalist

=== Amateur wrestling ===
- International Federation of Associated Wrestling Styles
  - 2007 World Cup Senior Greco-Roman Gold Medalist
  - 2007 Dave Schultz Memorial International Open Senior Greco-Roman Silver Medalist
  - 2006 FILA Wrestling World Championships Senior Greco-Roman Gold Medalist
  - 2006 Pan American Championships Senior-Greco Roman Gold Medalist
  - 2005 Sunkist Kids/ASU International Open Senior Greco-Roman Gold Medalist
  - 2005 Dave Schultz Memorial International Open Senior Greco-Roman Gold Medalist
  - 2004 Henri Deglane Challenge Senior Greco-Roman Bronze Medalist
  - 2004 Dave Schultz Memorial International Open Senior Greco-Roman Silver Medalist
  - 2003 NYAC Christmas International Open Senior Greco-Roman Gold Medalist
  - 2003 Henri Deglane Challenge Senior Greco-Roman Silver Medalist
  - 2003 Sunkist Kids International Open Senior Greco-Roman Gold Medalist
  - 2002 Henri Deglane Challenge Senior Greco-Roman Silver Medalist
  - 2002 Dave Schultz Memorial International Open Senior Greco-Roman Silver Medalist
- USA Wrestling
  - FILA World Team Trials Senior Greco-Roman Winner (2005, 2006, 2007)
  - USA Senior Greco-Roman National Championship (2005, 2006, 2007)
  - USA Senior Greco-Roman National Championship 3rd Place (2004)
  - USA Wrestling Greco-Roman Wrestler of the Year (2006)
  - USA University Greco-Roman National Championship (1998)
  - 2005 NYAC Holiday Tournament Senior Greco-Roman Gold Medalist
  - 2004 NYAC Christmas Championships Senior Greco-Roman Gold Medalist
  - 2004 USA Olympic Team Trials Senior Greco-Roman Runner-up
  - 2002 NYAC Christmas Classic Senior Greco-Roman Silver Medalist
- National Wrestling Hall of Fame Dan Gable Museum
  - Alan and Gloria Rice Greco-Roman Hall of Champions Inductee (2009)
- National Collegiate Athletic Association
  - NCAA Division I Collegiate National Championship 3rd Place (2000)
  - NCAA Division I All-American (2000)
  - Big Ten Conference Championship Runner-up (1998, 1999)
- Michigan High School Athletic Association
  - MHSAA Class A High School State Championship (1995)
  - MHSAA Class A High School State Championship 3rd Place (1994)
  - MHSAA Class A All-State (1993, 1994, 1995)

== World Championships Matches ==
Res.	Record	Opponent	Score	Date	Event	Location	Notes
2006 UWW world champion at 60kg
Win	7-2	(Georgia (country)) David Bedinadze	1-1, 4-1, 2-1	2006-09-20	2006 World Wrestling Championships	Guangzhou, China	Gold Medal
Win	6-2	(Romania) Eusebiu Diaconu	1-1, 2-1	2006-09-20	2006 World Wrestling Championships	Guangzhou, China	
Win	5-2	(Russia) Vyacheslav Djaste	4-1, 2-0	2006-09-20	2006 World Wrestling Championships	Guangzhou, China	
Win	4-2	(Iran) Ali Ashkani	2-1, 1-1	2006-09-20	2006 World Wrestling Championships	Guangzhou, China	
Win	3-2	(Uzbekistan) Dilshod Aripov	2-3, 3-1, 3-1	2006-09-20	2006 World Wrestling Championships	Guangzhou, China	
2005 UWW world 9th at 60kg
Loss	2-2	(Armenia) Vahan Juharyan	0-2, 1-1	2005-09-30	2005 World Wrestling Championships	Budapest, Hungary	
Loss	2-1	(Iran) Ali Ashkani	1-2, 0-7	2005-09-30	2005 World Wrestling Championships	Budapest, Hungary	
Win	2-0	(Venezuela) Luis Liendo	9-5, 7-0	2005-09-30	2005 World Wrestling Championships	Budapest, Hungary	
Win	1-0	(France) Eric Buisson	Fall	2005-09-30	2005 World Wrestling Championships	Budapest, Hungary	

== Mixed martial arts record ==
Professional record breakdown
23 matches	15 wins	8 losses
By knockout	3	3
By submission	2	3
By decision	10	2

Res.	Record	Opponent	Method	Event	Date	Round	Time	Location	Notes
Loss	15–8	Shawn Bunch	TKO (submission to punches)	Bellator 210	November 30, 2018	1	1:42	Thackerville, Oklahoma, United States	
Loss	15–7	Joe Taimanglo	Decision (split)	Bellator 195	March 2, 2018	3	5:00	Thackerville, Oklahoma, United States	
Win	15–6	Steve Garcia	Decision (unanimous)	Bellator 181	July 14, 2017	3	5:00	Thackerville, Oklahoma, United States	
Loss	14–6	Eduardo Dantas	Decision (majority)	Bellator 166	December 2, 2016	5	5:00	Thackerville, Oklahoma, United States	For the Bellator Bantamweight World Championship.
Win	14–5	Sirwan Kakai	Submission (guillotine choke)	Bellator 161	September 16, 2016	3	1:04	Cedar Park, Texas, United States	
Loss	13–5	Darrion Caldwell	Technical Submission (rear-naked choke)	Bellator 151	March 4, 2016	1	3:23	Thackerville, Oklahoma, United States	
Win	13–4	L.C. Davis	Decision (unanimous)	Bellator 143	September 25, 2015	3	5:00	Hidalgo, Texas, United States	
Loss	12–4	Marcos Galvão	Verbal Submission (kneebar)	Bellator 135	March 27, 2015	2	0:45	Thackerville, Oklahoma, United States	Lost the Bellator Bantamweight World Championship.
Win	12–3	Eduardo Dantas	Decision (unanimous)	Bellator 128	October 10, 2014	5	5:00	Thackerville, Oklahoma, United States	Won and unified Bellator Bantamweight World Championship.
Win	11–3	Rafael Silva	Decision (unanimous)	Bellator 118	May 2, 2014	5	5:00	Atlantic City, New Jersey, United States	Won the Interim Bellator Bantamweight Championship.
Win	10–3	Travis Marx	TKO (knee and punches)	Bellator 107	November 8, 2013	2	1:54	Thackerville, Oklahoma, United States	Won the Bellator Season 9 Bantamweight Tournament.
Win	9–3	Nick Kirk	Submission (reverse triangle armbar)	Bellator 101	September 27, 2013	2	3:03	Portland, Oregon, United States	Bellator Season 9 Bantamweight Tournament Semifinal.
Win	8–3	Owen Evinger	Decision (unanimous)	Bellator 80	November 9, 2012	3	5:00	Hollywood, Florida, United States	
Loss	7–3	Pat Curran	KO (punches)	Bellator 60	March 9, 2012	3	1:25	Hammond, Indiana, United States	Featherweight bout. Lost the Bellator Featherweight World Championship.
Loss	7–2	Alexis Vila	KO (punch)	Bellator 51	September 24, 2011	1	1:04	Canton, Ohio, United States	Bantamweight debut. Bellator Season 5 Bantamweight Tournament Quarterfinal.
Win	7–1	Marcos Galvão	Decision (unanimous)	Bellator 41	April 16, 2011	3	5:00	Yuma, Arizona, United States	Catchweight (137 lbs) bout.
Win	6–1	Joe Soto	KO (knee and punches)	Bellator 27	September 2, 2010	2	0:33	San Antonio, Texas, United States	Won the Bellator Featherweight World Championship.
Win	5–1	Patricio Freire	Decision (split)	Bellator 23	June 24, 2010	3	5:00	Louisville, Kentucky, United States	Won the Bellator Season 2 Featherweight Tournament.
Win	4–1	Georgi Karakhanyan	Decision (unanimous)	Bellator 18	May 13, 2010	3	5:00	Monroe, Louisiana, United States	Bellator Season 2 Featherweight Tournament Semifinal.
Win	3–1	Eric Marriott	Decision (unanimous)	Bellator 13	Apr 8, 2010	3	5:00	Hollywood, Florida, United States	Bellator Season 2 Featherweight Tournament Quarterfinal.
Loss	2–1	Bibiano Fernandes	Submission (armbar)	Dream 11	Oct 6, 2009	1	0:42	Yokohama, Japan	Dream 2009 Featherweight Grand Prix Semifinal.
Win	2–0	Norifumi Yamamoto	Decision (split)	Dream 9	May 26, 2009	2	5:00	Yokohama, Japan	Dream 2009 Featherweight Grand Prix Quarterfinal.
Win	1–0	Chase Beebe	TKO (doctor stoppage)	Dream 7	March 8, 2009	1	10:00	Saitama, Saitama, Japan	Dream 2009 Featherweight Grand Prix Opening Round.

== See also ==
- Double champions in MMA
- List of current mixed martial arts champions
- List of male mixed martial artists
- List of multi-sport athletes
- List of multi-sport champions
