= Darrion Caldwell =

American mixed martial artist (born 1987)

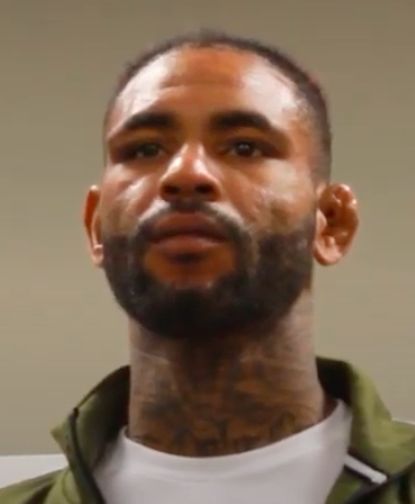
- Caldwell in 2019
- Born: December 19, 1987 (age 38); Rahway, New Jersey, U.S.
- Other names: The Wolf
- Height: 5 ft 10 in (1.78 m)
- Weight: 145 lb (66 kg; 10.4 st)
- Division: Bantamweight (2015–2019, 2021–present); Featherweight (2012–2014, 2019–2021)
- Reach: 74 in (188 cm)
- Style: Wrestling
- Fighting out of: Redlands, California, U.S.
- Team: Pinnacle Mixed Martial Arts (formerly); Sanford MMA (2021–present)
- Rank: Blue belt in Brazilian Jiu-Jitsu
- Wrestling: NCAA Division I Wrestling
- Years active: 2012–2023

Mixed martial arts record
- Total: 22
- Wins: 15
- By knockout: 2
- By submission: 6
- By decision: 7
- Losses: 7
- By knockout: 1
- By submission: 3
- By decision: 3

Other information
- University: North Carolina State University
- Mixed martial arts record from Sherdog

Darrion Caldwell (born December 19, 1987) is an American retired mixed martial artist and graduated collegiate wrestler, who competed in the bantamweight division. He formerly competed in Bellator MMA, where he is the former Bellator Bantamweight World Champion. A professional since 2012, he has also competed for Legacy FC. As a folkstyle wrestler, Caldwell was a 2009 NCAA Division I national champion and a two-time All-American at 149 pounds out of North Carolina State University. He was also a four-time Atlantic Coast Conference champion.

== Wrestling career ==
=== High school ===
Born and raised in Rahway, New Jersey, Caldwell was an outstanding athlete, lettering in wrestling, football, and baseball at Rahway High School. He was a two-time All-Region football player, but had his most success on the wrestling mats, as he had a record of 148-4 (three losses came as a freshman), and compiled three NJSIAA championships.

=== University ===
Caldwell continued wrestling at North Carolina State University.

==== 2006-07 ====
As a true freshman, he compiled 20 wins and 6 losses and was named ACC Wrestler of the year and Rookie of the year, as he won the Conference championship and posted an undefeated 9–0 record against ACC competition. Entering the NCAA championships unseeded, he opened up with a fall over the ninth seed and a forfeit over the eight seed, but was subsequently downed by the undefeated top-seed and ultimately eliminated by eventual NCAA champion J. Jaggers, missing All-American status.

==== 2007-08 ====
As a sophomore, he compiled 36 wins and 5 losses and also won the Cliff Keen Las Vegas Invitational during regular season. Post-season, he won his second straight ACC championship and made it to the semifinals of the NCAA's with a notable win over former NCAA champion Dustin Schlatter. However, he was defeated at the semifinals by the reigning Junior World Champion later turned MMA fighter Bubba Jenkins and by Josh Churella at the consolation semifinals. He ended up placing fifth after winning one more match. For that year's performance, he received the 2008 Wade Schalles Award for best collegiate pinner.

==== 2008-09 ====
As a junior, he compiled 38 wins and a lone loss that was an injury default, putting on one of the most outstanding seasons in the history of the program. In the post-season, he won his third ACC championship and entered the NCAA's as the third seed. At the tournament, he opened up with two wins over unranked opponents (one of them would go on to become a UFC fighter, Desmond Green) and two more victories over seeded opponents (all four matches with bonus points) to make it to the finale, where he faced the returning Dan Hodge Trophy winner Brent Metcalf. He would end up easily beating Metcalf 11–6 in one of the most iconic matches in NCAA Division I history to claim the championship and earn the Outstanding Wrestler award.

==== 2009-11 ====
Caldwell was forced to redshirt his next season due to a shoulder injury and came back as a senior in 2010–11. He compiled 15 wins and a lone loss and became a four-time Conference champion, before the shoulder injury resurged during his second match at the NCAA's (where he was the top-seed), forcing him to end his collegiate career. He finished his NC State collegiate career as an NCAA champion and four-time ACC champion, with a record of 109–13.

=== Freestyle ===
Caldwell made his senior freestyle debut at the 2009 US World Team Trials. He ended up placing third at the tournament. He came back in 2012 at the Dave Schultz Memorial, where he did not place. In his final senior freestyle competition, Caldwell competed at the 2012 US Olympic Team Trials Challenge, where he once again did not place and became an MMA fighter shortly after.

After more than eight years since his last freestyle wrestling showdown, Caldwell wrestled '20 Big Ten Conference champion Luke Pletcher on July 25, 2020, at FloWrestling: Dake vs. Chamizo. He lost the bout on points.

== Mixed martial arts career ==
=== Early career: Legacy Fighting Championship ===
In July 2012, it was revealed that Caldwell had signed with Texas-based promotion Legacy Fighting Championship.

Caldwell made his MMA and promotional debut against David Armas at Legacy FC 14 on September 14, 2012. For the majority of the fight, Caldwell was able to control the fight on the ground, mounting and taking Armas' back several times. He won via unanimous decision.

In his second professional fight, Caldwell met Quaint Kempf at Legacy FC 16 on December 14, 2012. He won the fight via TKO after dropping Kempf with a left hand and unloading with a series of punches on the ground.

Caldwell next faced Gerzan Chaw at Legacy FC 21 on July 19, 2013. He won the fight via unanimous decision after three rounds.

=== Bellator MMA ===
==== Featherweight ====
Caldwell signed with Bellator MMA in November 2013.

Caldwell made his debut for the promotion against Lance Surma on March 14, 2014 at Bellator 112. He won via guillotine choke submission at 0:50 in the first round.

In his second appearance for Bellator, Caldwell faced Joe Pingitore at Bellator 118 on May 2, 2014. He won via submission in the first round, improving his record to 5–0.

In his third appearance for the promotion, Caldwell faced Anthony Dizi at Bellator 130 on October 24, 2014. He won the fight via unanimous decision. He later stated in an interview that he plans to move down to the bantamweight division.

==== Bantamweight ====
Caldwell made his bantamweight debut against Rafael Silva on May 15, 2015 at Bellator 137. He won the fight by unanimous decision.

Caldwell next faced Shawn Bunch at Bellator 143 on September 25, 2015. He won the fight via submission in the first round.

In his highest profile fight to date, Caldwell faced former two-time Bellator champion Joe Warren in the main event at Bellator 151 on March 4, 2016. Caldwell dominated the fight, winning via technical submission due to a rear-naked choke in the first round.

Caldwell then faced Joe Taimanglo at Bellator 159. He lost the bout via guillotine choke in the third round.

Due to Taimanglo missing weight in their first bout, Caldwell faced Taimanglo in a rematch in the main event at Bellator 167 on December 3, 2016. He won the bout via unanimous decision.

After avenging his first loss, Caldwell was set to face champion Eduardo Dantas for the Bellator bantamweight championship at Bellator 177 on April 14, 2017. An injury, however, forced Caldwell out of the bout. Thus, he was replaced with Bellator newcomer Leandro Higo. Dantas would go on to defeat the latter via split decision in a non-title affair.

The bantamweight title bout against Dantas was rescheduled for Bellator 184 on October 6, 2017. Caldwell won via unanimous decision to become the Bellator Bantamweight Champion.

In the first defense of his title, Caldwell faced Leandro Higo on March 2, 2018 in the main event at Bellator 195. He won the fight via guillotine choke submission in the first round.

==== Return to Featherweight ====
In August 2018, Caldwell moved up to featherweight and faced Noad Lahat in a non-title fight at Bellator 204 in Sioux Falls, South Dakota. He won the fight by knockout in the second round.

==== Rizin FF ====
Caldwell took part in a Bellator vs. Rizin interpromotional champion vs. champion bout and faced Kyoji Horiguchi for the Rizin Bantamweight Championship at Rizin 14 on December 31, 2018. He lost the fight via submission in the third round

==== Return to Bellator and losing the Bellator Bantamweight World title ====
In April 2019, it was announced that Caldwell would make his second Bellator Bantamweight title defense against Kyoji Horiguchi on June 14, 2019 at Bellator 222 in a rematch of their Rizin title bout. Caldwell lost the rematch by unanimous decision.

==== Bellator Featherweight Grand Prix ====
On July 15, 2019, Bellator MMA president Scott Coker announced a 16-man Featherweight Grand Prix tournament and announced Caldwell as one of the participants. Caldwell faced Henry Corrales in the opening round of the tournament at Bellator 228 on September 28. He won the fight by unanimous decision.

In the quarterfinals, Caldwell faced Ádám Borics at Bellator 238 on January 25, 2020. He won the bout via first round submission.

In the semifinals, Caldwell was slated to face A. J. McKee at Bellator 244 on June 6, 2020. However, the event was postponed due to the COVID-19 pandemic. The bout was rescheduled and is set to take place on November 19 at Bellator 253. Caldwell was defeated via first round submission.

==== Return to Bantamweight ====
Caldwell made his return to bantamweight against Leandro Higo at Bellator 259 on May 21, 2021. At the weigh-ins, Higo weighed in at 137.5 pounds, one and a half pounds over the bantamweight non-title fight limit. The bout proceeded at catchweight and Higo was fined a percentage of his purse, which went to Caldwell. Caldwell lost the bout via split decision.

Caldwell faced Enrique Barzola on January 29, 2022 at Bellator 273. He lost the bout via ground and pound TKO in the third round.

Caldwell faced Nikita Mikhailov on February 4, 2023 at Bellator 290. Despite dominating in the wrestling and maintaining top control throughout the bout, Caldwell lost the bout via unanimous decision due to not outputting much damage from top.

On November 22, 2023, Caldwell announced he was no longer under contract with Bellator.

==== Post Bellator ====
Caldwell was scheduled to fight Tarcísio Romano at LFA 182 on April 26, 2024. Romano was forced out of the fight due to injury and a replacement was not found in time.

== Celebratory backflip incidents ==
In the last seconds of his 2009 NCAA championship match against Brent Metcalf, Caldwell attempted to celebrate early with a handspring and backflip. While in the middle of his backflip, Metcalf pushed him, making him fall hard on his back. The push occurred slightly after the whistle. Metcalf later apologized, citing a fight-to-the-end wrestler mentality and frustration.

After defeating Shawn Bunch at Bellator 143 in 2015, Caldwell did a backflip off the cage and landed on a camerawoman, whose shot was live at the time. Though knocked down, she was uninjured, and Caldwell apologized.

== Championships and accomplishments ==
=== Mixed martial arts ===
- Bellator MMA
  - Bellator Bantamweight World Championship (One time)
    - One successful title defense
  - Most submission wins in Bellator Bantamweight division history (three)

=== Folkstyle wrestling ===
- National Collegiate Athletic Association
  - NCAA Division I Champion out of North Carolina State University (2009)
  - NCAA Division I All-American out of North Carolina State University (2008, 2009)
  - NCAA Division I 149 lb - 5th Place out of North Carolina State University (2008)
  - NCAA Division I 149 lb - 1st Place out of North Carolina State University (2009)
- Atlantic Coast Conference
  - ACC 141 lb Conference Championship out of North Carolina State University (2007)
  - ACC 149 lb Conference Championship out of North Carolina State University (2008, 2009, 2011)

== Mixed martial arts record ==
Professional record breakdown
22 matches	15 wins	7 losses
By knockout	2	1
By submission	6	3
By decision	7	3

Res.	Record	Opponent	Method	Event	Date	Round	Time	Location	Notes
Loss	15–7	Nikita Mikhailov	Decision (unanimous)	Bellator 290	February 4, 2023	3	5:00	Inglewood, California, United States	
Loss	15–6	Enrique Barzola	TKO (punches and elbows)	Bellator 273	January 29, 2022	3	3:01	Phoenix, Arizona, United States	
Loss	15–5	Leandro Higo	Decision (split)	Bellator 259	May 21, 2021	3	5:00	Uncasville, Connecticut, United States	Return to Bantamweight; Higo missed weight (137.5 lb).
Loss	15–4	A. J. McKee	Submission (neck crank)	Bellator 253	November 19, 2020	1	1:11	Uncasville, Connecticut, United States	Bellator Featherweight World Grand Prix Semifinals.
Win	15–3	Ádám Borics	Submission (rear-naked choke)	Bellator 238	January 25, 2020	1	2:20	Inglewood, California, United States	Bellator Featherweight World Grand Prix Quarterfinals.
Win	14–3	Henry Corrales	Decision (unanimous)	Bellator 228	September 28, 2019	3	5:00	Inglewood, California, United States	Return to Featherweight. Bellator Featherweight World Grand Prix Opening Round.
Loss	13–3	Kyoji Horiguchi	Decision (unanimous)	Bellator 222	June 14, 2019	5	5:00	New York City, New York, United States	Lost the Bellator Bantamweight World Championship.
Loss	13–2	Kyoji Horiguchi	Submission (guillotine choke)	Rizin 14	December 31, 2018	3	1:12	Saitama, Japan	For the inaugural Rizin Bantamweight Championship.
Win	13–1	Noad Lahat	KO (punches)	Bellator 204	August 17, 2018	2	2:46	Sioux Falls, South Dakota, United States	Featherweight bout.
Win	12–1	Leandro Higo	Submission (guillotine choke)	Bellator 195	March 2, 2018	1	2:36	Thackerville, Oklahoma, United States	Defended the Bellator Bantamweight World Championship.
Win	11–1	Eduardo Dantas	Decision (unanimous)	Bellator 184	October 6, 2017	5	5:00	Thackerville, Oklahoma, United States	Won the Bellator Bantamweight World Championship.
Win	10–1	Joe Taimanglo	Decision (unanimous)	Bellator 167	December 3, 2016	3	5:00	Thackerville, Oklahoma, United States	
Loss	9–1	Joe Taimanglo	Submission (guillotine choke)	Bellator 159	July 22, 2016	3	0:09	Mulvane, Kansas, United States	Catchweight (138 lbs); Taimanglo missed weight.
Win	9–0	Joe Warren	Technical Submission (rear-naked choke)	Bellator 151	March 4, 2016	1	3:23	Thackerville, Oklahoma, United States	
Win	8–0	Shawn Bunch	Submission (rear-naked choke)	Bellator 143	September 25, 2015	1	2:35	Hidalgo, Texas, United States	
Win	7–0	Rafael Silva	Decision (unanimous)	Bellator 137	May 15, 2015	3	5:00	Temecula, California, United States	Bantamweight debut.
Win	6–0	Anthony Dizy	Decision (unanimous)	Bellator 130	October 24, 2014	3	5:00	Mulvane, Kansas, United States	
Win	5–0	Joe Pingitore	Submission (rear-naked choke)	Bellator 118	May 2, 2014	1	1:32	Atlantic City, New Jersey, United States	
Win	4–0	Lance Surma	Submission (guillotine choke)	Bellator 112	March 14, 2014	1	0:50	Hammond, Indiana, United States	
Win	3–0	Gerzan Chaw	Decision (unanimous)	Legacy FC 21	July 19, 2013	3	5:00	Houston, Texas, United States	
Win	2–0	Quaint Kempf	TKO (punches)	Legacy FC 16	December 14, 2012	1	1:00	Dallas, Texas, United States	
Win	1–0	David Armas	Decision (unanimous)	Legacy FC 14	September 14, 2012	3	3:00	Houston, Texas, United States	Featherweight debut.

== Freestyle record ==
Senior Freestyle Matches
Res.	Record	Opponent	Score	Date	Event	Location
Loss	6-8	(United States) Bo Bassett	Fall	November 29, 2025	RAF 03	(United States) Chicago, Illinois
Loss	6-7	(United States) Real Woods	Fall	August 30, 2025	RAF 01	(United States) Cleveland, Ohio
Loss	6-6	(United States) Luke Pletcher	2-9	July 25, 2020	FloWrestling: Dake vs. Chamizo	(United States) Austin, Texas
2012 US Olympic Team Trials at 66 kg
Loss	6-5	(United States) Destin McCauley	3-3, 1-1	March 31 - April 1, 2012	2012 US Olympic Team Trials	(United States) Cedar Falls, Iowa
Loss	6-4	(United States) Jason Tsirtsis	0-8, 1-1	March 31 - April 1, 2012	2012 US Olympic Team Trials	(United States) Cedar Falls, Iowa
Win	6-3	(United States) Jacob Wadley	7-1, 8-3	March 31 - April 1, 2012	2012 US Olympic Team Trials	(United States) Cedar Falls, Iowa
Win	5-3	(United States) Brandon Bradley	TF 6–0, 7-0	March 31 - April 1, 2012	2012 US Olympic Team Trials	(United States) Cedar Falls, Iowa
2012 Dave Schultz Memorial International at 66 kg
Loss	4-3	(United States) Chase Pami	0-3, 0-2	February 2–4, 2012	2012 Dave Schultz Memorial International	(United States) Colorado Springs, Colorado
Win	4-2	(India) Rahul Mann	Fall	February 2–4, 2012	2012 Dave Schultz Memorial International	(United States) Colorado Springs, Colorado
2009 Heydar Aliyev Golden Grand Prix 15th at 66 kg
Loss	3-2	(Georgia (country)) Koba Kakaladze	4-2, 2–4, 1-3	July 27, 2009	2009 Heydar Aliyev Golden Grand Prix	Baku, Azerbaijan
2009 US World Team Trials (bronze) at 66 kg
Win	3-1	(United States) Josh Churella	1-0, 4-1	May 29–31, 2009	2009 US World Team Trials Challenge	(United States) Council Bluffs, Iowa
Loss	2-1	(United States) Jared Frayer	2-2, 2-3	May 29–31, 2009	2009 US World Team Trials Challenge	(United States) Council Bluffs, Iowa
Win	2-0	(United States) Brian Stith	1-0, 1-0	May 29–31, 2009	2009 US World Team Trials Challenge	(United States) Council Bluffs, Iowa
Win	1-0	(United States) Doug Schwab	1-0, 2-1	May 29–31, 2009	2009 US World Team Trials Challenge	(United States) Council Bluffs, Iowa

== NCAA record ==
NCAA Championships Matches
Res.	Record	Opponent	Score	Date	Event
2011 NCAA Championships at 149 lbs
Win	10–4	Ivan Lopouchanski	MD 18-7	March 17–19, 2011	2011 NCAA Division I Wrestling Championships
2009 NCAA Championships (gold) at 149 lbs
Win	9–4	Brent Metcalf	11-6	March 19–21, 2009	2009 NCAA Division I Wrestling Championships
Win	8–4	Bryce Saddoris	MD 13-2	March 19–21, 2009	2009 NCAA Division I Wrestling Championships
Win	7–4	Jake Patacsil	MD 10-1	March 19–21, 2009	2009 NCAA Division I Wrestling Championships
Win	6–4	Desmond Green	MD 10-2	March 19–21, 2009	2009 NCAA Division I Wrestling Championships
Win	5–4	Cesar Grajales	Fall	March 19–21, 2009	2009 NCAA Division I Wrestling Championships
2008 NCAA Championships 5th at 149 lbs
Loss	4–4	Josh Churella	1-6	March 20–22, 2008	2008 NCAA Division I Wrestling Championships
Loss	4–3	Bubba Jenkins	8-12	March 20–22, 2008	2008 NCAA Division I Wrestling Championships
Win	4–2	Dustin Schlatter	4-1	March 20–22, 2008	2008 NCAA Division I Wrestling Championships
Win	3–2	Brandon Carter	Fall	March 20–22, 2008	2008 NCAA Division I Wrestling Championships
Win	2–2	Michael Roberts	Fall	March 20–22, 2008	2008 NCAA Division I Wrestling Championships
2007 NCAA Championships at 141 lbs
Loss	1–2	J. Jaggers	Fall	March 15–17, 2007	2007 NCAA Division I Wrestling Championships
Loss	1–1	Ryan Lang	Fall	March 15–17, 2007	2007 NCAA Division I Wrestling Championships
Win	1–0	Kenneth Hashimoto	Fall	March 15–17, 2007	2007 NCAA Division I Wrestling Championships
