= 2015 in Bellator MMA =

Mixed martial arts events

Information
- Promotion: Bellator MMA
- First date aired: January 16, 2015
- Last date aired: December 4, 2015

2015 in Bellator MMA was the seventh year in the history of Bellator MMA, a mixed martial arts promotion based in the United States. Bellator held 16 events in 2015.

== Background ==
In June 2014, Founder and CEO Bjorn Rebney parted with the company. Former Strikeforce founder Scott Coker was announced as the new President of Bellator MMA. Beginning this year, Bellator would drop its original, weekly, seasonal tournament format and adopt a traditional monthly schedule.

2015 would also see a collaboration between Bellator and kickboxing promotion Glory, both of which aired fight cards on Spike TV. Announced in June, Bellator MMA & Glory: Dynamite 1 (or Bellator 142: Dynamite 1) was broadcast live on September 19.

== Bellator 132 ==
Bellator 132: Pitbull vs. Straus 2
- Date: January 16, 2015
- Venue: Pechanga Resort & Casino
- City: Temecula, California
- Attendance: 1,300
- Total purse: $243,200

Bellator 132: Pitbull vs. Straus 2 took place January 16, 2015 at Pechanga Resort & Casino in Temecula, California. The event aired live in prime time on Spike TV.

Background

A Bellator Featherweight World Championship rematch between Patrício Pitbull and Daniel Straus headlined the event. The two originally met in a closely contested fight at Bellator 45 on May 21, 2011, with Pitbull winning the bout via unanimous decision.

Results

Main Card (Spike TV)
Weight class				Method	Round	Time	Notes
Featherweight	Patrício Pitbull (c)	def.	Daniel Straus	Submission (rear-naked choke)	4	4:49	(Note: For the Bellator Featherweight World Championship.)
Featherweight	Georgi Karakhanyan	def.	Bubba Jenkins	Technical Submission (guillotine choke)	1	1:49
Light Heavyweight	Virgil Zwicker	def.	Houston Alexander	Decision (split) (29-28, 27-30, 29-28)	3	5:00
Welterweight	Fernando Gonzalez	def.	Marius Žaromskis	Decision (unanimous) (30-27, 30-27, 30-27)	3	5:00
Preliminary Card (Spike.com)
Middleweight	John Salter	def.	Dustin Jacoby	Submission (rear-naked choke)	2	3:33
Heavyweight	Everett Cummings	def.	Jason Glaza	Technical Submission (rear-naked choke)	2	1:55
Lightweight	Steve Kozola	def.	Jonathan Rivera	KO (punches)	2	1:25
Lightweight	Derek Anderson	def.	Danny Navarro	TKO (punches)	3	3:51
Bantamweight	Albert Morales	def.	Fabian Gonzalez	Submission (rear-naked choke)	2	3:12
Middleweight	Chris Herrera	def.	Luc Bondole	KO (punch)	2	3:21

== Bellator 133 ==
Bellator 133: Shlemenko vs. Manhoef
- Date: February 13, 2015
- Venue: Save Mart Center
- City: Fresno, California
- Attendance: 5,184
- Total purse: $173,000

Bellator 133: Shlemenko vs. Manhoef took place February 13, 2015 at Save Mart Center in Fresno, California. The event aired live in prime time on Spike TV.

Background

This event was headlined with a bout between former Bellator Middleweight Champion Alexander Shlemenko and Melvin Manhoef.

Results

Main Card (Spike TV)
Weight class				Method	Round	Time	Notes
Middleweight	Alexander Shlemenko	vs.	Melvin Manhoef	No Contest (overturned)	2	1:25	(Note: Originally a KO win for Shlemenko, but changed to No Contest due to Shlemenko test positive for elevated testosterone level.)
Featherweight	Daniel Weichel	def.	Pat Curran	Decision (split) (28-29, 29-28, 29-28)	3	5:00
Women's Featherweight	Julia Budd	def.	Gabrielle Holloway	Decision (unanimous) (30-26, 30-25, 30-24)	3	5:00
Welterweight	Chris Honeycutt	def.	Clayton MacFarlane	TKO (body punches)	3	4:16
Preliminary Card (Spike.com)
Featherweight	Emilio Chavez	def.	Art Arciniega	Decision (unanimous) (30-27, 29-28, 29-28)	3	5:00
Middleweight	Blake Watkins	def.	George Zuniga	KO (punches)	1	0:55
Bantamweight	Paul Ruiz	def.	Nicolas Sperling	Submission (guillotine choke)	1	0:43
Postliminary Card (Dark Bouts)
Lightweight	Nick Bustamante	def.	Luis Jauregui	Submission (armbar)	2	0:35
Light Heavyweight	John Paul Elias	def.	Cody Sons	TKO (punches)	1	0:40
Welterweight	Mason Fowler	def.	Marko Damiani	TKO (punches)	1	1:02
Lightweight	Jonathan Contrestano	def.	Ryan Tobar	TKO (doctor stoppage)	2	2:40
Catchweight (160 lb)	Adam Piccolotti	def.	Andrew Ramm	Decision (unanimous) (30-27, 30-27, 30-27)	3	5:00

== Bellator 134 ==
Bellator 134: Newton vs. McGeary
- Date: February 27, 2015
- Venue: Mohegan Sun Arena
- City: Uncasville, Connecticut
- Attendance: 8,372

Bellator 134: Newton vs. McGeary took place February 27, 2015 at the Mohegan Sun Arena in Uncasville, Connecticut. The event aired live during prime time on Spike TV, and was followed up with an encore of the entire event.

Background

The main card of Bellator 134 was announced on the air during Bellator 131. President Scott Coker announced the main card fights would feature fighters representing the United States taking on fighters representing the United Kingdom.

The event was headlined by a Light Heavyweight Championship match between current champion Emanuel Newton and Bellator 2014 Summer Series Light Heavyweight Tournament Winner Liam McGeary.

Douglas Lima was originally scheduled to defend his Welterweight title against Paul Daley on this card. However, in early January 2015, he pulled out of the bout due to an injury.

Michael Page was expected to face Curtis Millender but withdrew due to a cut over his left eye and was replaced by Brennan Ward. As a result of the move, Ward's original opponent, Jesse Juarez, was pulled from the card altogether.

Results

Main Card (Spike TV)
Weight class				Method	Round	Time	Notes
Light Heavyweight	Liam McGeary	def.	Emanuel Newton (c)	Decision (unanimous) (48-46, 48-47, 48-47)	5	5:00	(Note: For the Bellator Light Heavyweight Championship)
Heavyweight	Muhammed Lawal	def.	Cheick Kongo	Decision (split) (30-27, 28-29, 29-28)	3	5:00
Welterweight	Paul Daley	def.	André Santos	Decision (unanimous) (29-27, 29-28, 29-28)	3	5:00
Light Heavyweight	Linton Vassell	def.	Rameau Thierry Sokoudjou	TKO (punches)	2	3:18
Welterweight	Brennan Ward	def.	Curtis Millender	Submission (rear-naked choke)	1	1:39
Preliminary Card (Spike.com)
Lightweight	Dean Hancock	def.	Mike Mangan	Submission (rear-naked choke)	1	1:33
Featherweight	Matt Bessette	def.	Josh LaBerge	TKO (doctor stoppage)	2	5:00
Heavyweight	Raphael Butler	def.	Josh Diekmann	Submission (standing guillotine)	1	1:04
Middleweight	Tamdan McCrory	def.	Jason Butcher	Submission (armbar)	1	1:06
Welterweight	Neiman Gracie	def.	Bobby Flynn	Submission (neck crank)	1	2:36
Bantamweight	Blair Tugman	def.	Marvin Maldonado	Decision (unanimous) (30-26, 30-27, 30-27)	3	5:00

== Bellator 135 ==
Bellator 135: Warren vs. Galvao 2
- Date: March 27, 2015
- Venue: WinStar World Casino
- City: Thackerville, Oklahoma
- Attendance: 1,345

Bellator 135: Warren vs. Galvao 2 took March 27, 2015 at WinStar World Casino in Thackerville, Oklahoma. The event aired live in prime time on Spike TV.

Background

This event headlined the Bellator Bantamweight Championship between champion Joe Warren and challenger Marcos Galvao.

Mike Richman was expected to face Eduardo Dantas but forced out by injury. As a result, L.C. Davis vs. Hideo Tokoro elevated to the co-main event.

Results

Main Card (Spike TV)
Weight class				Method	Round	Time	Notes
Bantamweight	Marcos Galvão	def.	Joe Warren (c)	Verbal Submission (kneebar)	2	0:45	(Note: For the Bellator Bantamweight Championship)
Bantamweight	L.C. Davis	def.	Hideo Tokoro	Decision (split) (29-28, 28-29, 29-28)	3	5:00
Light Heavyweight	Francis Carmont	def.	Guilherme Viana	Decision (unanimous) (29-28, 29-28, 29-28)	3	5:00
Lightweight	Ryan Couture	def.	Dakota Cochrane	Submission (rear-naked choke)	1	3:23
Preliminary Card (Spike.com)
Heavyweight	Rashad Coulter	def.	Jeremiah O'Neal	TKO (knee and punches)	1	1:44
Featherweight	Emmanuel Sanchez	def.	Alejandro Villalobos	Decision (unanimous) (30-27, 29-28, 29-28)	3	5:00
Welterweight	Sean Holden	def.	Tim Roman	Decision (unanimous) (30-27, 30-27, 30-27)	3	5:00
Middleweight	Neal Ewing	def.	Logan Nail	Decision (unanimous) (30-27, 30-27, 29-28)	3	5:00
Catchweight (147 lb)	Stephen Banaszak	def.	Brad Mitchell	Submission (omoplata)	2	2:51
Flyweight	Klayton Mai	def.	Xavier Siller	Submission (neck crank)	1	3:55
Bantamweight	Geo Pacurariu	def.	J.P. Cole	Submission (straight armbar)	1	2:59

== Bellator 136 ==
Bellator 136: Brooks vs. Jansen
- Date: April 10, 2015
- Venue: Bren Events Center
- City: Irvine, California
- Attendance: 4,869
- Total purse: $284,000

Bellator 136: Brooks vs. Jansen took place on April 10, 2015 at Bren Events Center in Irvine, California. The event aired live in prime time on Spike TV.

Background

This event was headlined by Lightweight Championship match between current champion Will Brooks and Season 7 Lightweight Tournament Winner Dave Jansen.

The co-main event was a middleweight fight between longtime kickboxer Joe Schilling and Rafael Carvalho.

Results

Main Card (Spike TV)
Weight class				Method	Round	Time	Notes
Lightweight	Will Brooks (c)	def.	Dave Jansen	Decision (unanimous) (49-46, 49-46, 49-46)	5	5:00	(Note: For the Bellator Lightweight Championship)
Middleweight	Rafael Carvalho	def.	Joe Schilling	Decision (split) (29-28, 28-29, 30-27)	3	5:00
Lightweight	Marcin Held	def.	Alexander Sarnavskiy	Verbal Submission (kneebar)	3	1:11
Heavyweight	Tony Johnson	def.	Alexander Volkov	Decision (split) (29-28, 29-28, 28-29)	3	5:00
Preliminary Card (Spike.com)
Middleweight	Joey Beltran	def.	Brian Rogers	Decision (majority) (29-27, 29-28, 28-28)	3	5:00
Lightweight	Saad Awad	def.	Rob Sinclair	Decision (unanimous) (30-27, 30-27, 30-27)	3	5:00
Featherweight	John Teixeira	def.	Fabrício Guerreiro	Decision (split) (29-28, 29-28, 28-29)	3	5:00
Postliminary Card (Dark Bouts)
Catchweight (150 lb)	Cleber Luciano	def.	Aaron Miller	Submission (armbar)	2	4:36
Middleweight	Chris Herrera	vs.	Luc Bondole	Split Draw (27-29, 29-28, 28-28)	3	5:00
Flyweight	Steve Ramirez	def.	Jonathan Santa Maria	Submission (toe hold)	1	3:29
Featherweight	Justin Governale	def.	Jay Bogan	Submission (rear-naked choke)	2	2:09
Bantamweight	Chad George	def.	Mark Vorgeas	Technical Submission (Von Flue choke)	1	3:37
Featherweight	A.J. McKee	def.	Marcos Bonilla	Submission (rear-naked choke)	1	2:08

== Bellator 137 ==
Bellator 137: Halsey vs. Grove
- Date: May 15, 2015
- Venue: Pechanga Resort and Casino
- City: Temecula, California
- Attendance: 1,200
- Total purse: $310,040

Bellator 137: Halsey vs. Grove took place May 15, 2015 at the Pechanga Resort and Casino in Temecula, California. The event aired live in prime time on Spike TV.

Background

The event was expected to be headlined by a Bellator Middleweight Championship bout between then champion Brandon Halsey and UFC veteran Kendall Grove. However, Halsey came in overweight at the weigh-ins, weighing in at 188.1 lb. This prompted Bellator to create a stipulation that if Halsey won the bout, the championship would be vacated. If Grove won the bout, he would become the undisputed champion.

The co-main event featured a Bellator Bantamweight Championship title eliminator bout between former champion Eduardo Dantas and Mike Richman. This bout was briefly in jeopardy as Richman missed weight and Dantas agreed for the fight to continue under the condition that Richman wouldn't weight more than 147 pounds on fight night, but Richman declined. However, both fighters' camps agreed to new stipulations the day of the fight.

A.J. Matthews was expected to face Ben Reiter at the event. However, Matthews was forced out of the bout and was replaced by Strikeforce and UFC veteran Benji Radach.

Results

Main Card (Spike TV)
Weight class				Method	Round	Time	Notes
Catchweight (189 lb)	Brandon Halsey	def.	Kendall Grove	TKO (punches)	4	2:25	(Note: For the Bellator Middleweight World Championship. Halsey missed weight and was immediately stripped of the championship. Title was at stake for Grove only.)
Catchweight (140 lb)	Eduardo Dantas	def.	Mike Richman	Decision (unanimous) (29-28, 29-28, 29-28)	3	5:00	(Note: Bellator Bantamweight Championship title eliminator.)
Welterweight	Fernando Gonzalez	def.	Curtis Millender	Submission (guillotine choke)	3	1:14
Bantamweight	Darrion Caldwell	def.	Rafael Silva	Decision (unanimous) (29-28, 29-28, 29-28)	3	5:00
Preliminary Card (Spike.com)
Catchweight (137 lb)	Joe Taimanglo	def.	Antonio Duarte	KO (punch)	3	1:00
Featherweight	Jordan Parsons	def.	Julio Cesar Neves	Submission (arm-triangle choke)	3	4:09
Catchweight (207 lb)	Virgil Zwicker	def.	Razak Al-Hassan	KO (punch)	1	3:51
Welterweight	Ricky Rainey	def.	Jesse Juarez	KO (knee)	2	1:13
Postliminary Card (Dark Bouts)
Bantamweight	Albert Morales	def.	John Yoo	TKO (punches)	3	1:43
Bantamweight	Shawn Bunch	def.	Rolando Perez	Decision (unanimous) (29-28, 29-28, 29-28)	3	5:00
Lightweight	Steve Kozola	def.	Ian Butler	KO (punches)	1	2:22
Women's Featherweight	Arlene Blencowe	def.	Adrienna Jenkins	TKO (punches)	1	4:08
Middleweight	Ben Reiter	def.	Benji Radach	Decision (unanimous) (30-27, 29-28, 30-27)	3	5:00

== Bellator 138 ==
Bellator 138: Shamrock vs. Kimbo Slice
- Date: June 19, 2015
- Venue: Scottrade Center
- City: St. Louis, Missouri
- Attendance: 6,724
- Total gate: $381,184

Bellator 138: Unfinished Business took place on June 19, 2015 at the Scottrade Center in St. Louis, Missouri and was broadcast live in prime time on Spike TV, attracting an average 1.7 million viewers.

Background

The event was headlined by a heavyweight bout between combat sports veterans Kimbo Slice and Ken Shamrock. The two were originally expected to fight on October 4, 2008 at the BankAtlantic Center in Sunrise, Florida as part of CBS' Saturday Night Fights at EliteXC: Heat. However, Shamrock received a cut to the left eye during a warm-up only hours before the fight was to take place. That bout was eventually rescheduled for this event.

The co-main event was originally expected to feature a Bellator Featherweight Championship bout between current champion Patrício Freire and former WSOF Featherweight champion Georgi Karakhanyan. However, Karakhanyan was forced out of the bout due to an injury and was replaced by Season 10 Featherweight Tournament winner Daniel Weichel.

Bobby Lashley was originally scheduled to face James Thompson at this event. However, on June 10, it was announced that Thompson pulled out of the bout due to injury and was replaced by Dan Charles.

Bellator 138 was the highest rated Bellator event to date before Bellator 149. It did an average of 1.6 million viewers for the whole event and a peak of 2.4 million during the Kimbo Slice and Ken Shamrock fight with a DVR peak of 2.9 million. The previous high was Bellator 131 which did 1.2 million average for the entire event and a peak of 2 million during the Tito Ortiz and Stephan Bonnar fight and a DVR peak of 2.2 million.

Results

Main Card (Spike TV)
Weight class				Method	Round	Time	Notes
Catchweight (232 lb)	Kimbo Slice	def.	Ken Shamrock	KO (punches)	1	2:22
Featherweight	Patrício Freire (c)	def.	Daniel Weichel	KO (punch)	2	0:32	(Note: For the Bellator Featherweight Championship.)
Heavyweight	Bobby Lashley	def.	Dan Charles	TKO (punches)	2	4:14
Featherweight	Daniel Mason-Straus	def.	Henry Corrales	Submission (guillotine choke)	2	3:47
Lightweight	Michael Chandler	def.	Derek Campos	Submission (rear-naked choke)	1	2:17
Preliminary Card (Spike.com)
Welterweight	Justin Guthrie	def.	Steven Mann	Submission (D'Arce choke)	2	1:09
Featherweight	Justin Lawrence	def.	Sean Wilson	TKO (elbows and punches)	1	4:56
Catchweight (160 lb)	Chris Heatherly	def.	Garrett Gross	Decision (unanimous) (29-28, 29-28, 29-28)	3	5:00
Welterweight	Kyle Kurtz	def.	Adam Cella	Submission (armbar)	2	4:13
Lightweight	Hugh Pulley	def.	Eric Irvin	Decision (split) (29-28, 28-29, 30-27)	3	5:00
Strawweight	Miles McDonald	def.	Dan O’Connor	Submission (rear-naked choke)	3	4:30
Postliminary Card (Dark Bouts)
Bantamweight	Garrett Mueller	def.	A.J. Siscoe	Submission (rear-naked choke)	2	1:26
Middleweight	Enrique Watson	def.	Kain Royer	Submission (rear-naked choke)	1	0:41
Catchweight (165 lb)	Rashard Lovelace	def.	Matt Helm	TKO (leg kick)	1	0:58

== Bellator 139 ==
Bellator 139: Kongo vs. Volkov
- Date: June 26, 2015
- Venue: Kansas Star Casino
- City: Mulvane, Kansas
- Attendance: 2,500

Bellator 139: Kongo vs. Volkov took place June 26, 2015 at Kansas Star Casino in Mulvane, Kansas. The event aired live in prime time on Spike TV.

Background

This event was headlined by a heavyweight bout between UFC veteran Cheick Kongo and former Bellator Heavyweight Champion Alexander Volkov. It was also Hisaki Kato's Bellator Debut.

Results

Main Card (Spike TV)
Weight class				Method	Round	Time	Notes
Heavyweight	Cheick Kongo	def.	Alexander Volkov	Decision (unanimous) (30-27, 30-27, 30-27)	3	5:00
Lightweight	David Rickels	vs.	John Alessio	No Contest (illegal knee)	1	2:24
Middleweight	Hisaki Kato	def.	Joe Schilling	KO (superman punch)	2	0:34
Featherweight	Pat Curran	def.	Emmanuel Sanchez	Decision (unanimous) (30-27, 30-27, 30-27)	3	5:00
Preliminary Card (Spike.com)
Bantamweight	Aaron Ely	def.	Jeimeson Saudino	Submission (guillotine choke)	2	1:05
Women's Featherweight	Bryanna Fissori	def.	Iony Razafiarison	Decision (unanimous) (29-28, 29-28, 29-28)	3	5:00
Heavyweight	Alex Huddleston	def.	Javy Ayala	Submission (rear-naked choke)	1	1:12
Heavyweight	Augusto Sakai	def.	Daniel Gallemore	TKO (retirement)	2	5:00
Featherweight	Bubba Jenkins	def.	Joe Wilk	TKO (punches)	2	1:00
Lightweight	Bobby Cooper	def.	Pablo Villaseca	Decision (split) (28-29, 29-28, 29-28)	3	5:00
Featherweight	Gastón Reyno	def.	Greg Scott	Submission (guillotine choke)	1	1:17
Postliminary Card (Dark Bouts)
Heavyweight	Frederick Brown	def.	Derek Bohi	TKO (punches)	1	0:29

== Bellator 140 ==
Bellator 140: Lima vs. Koreshkov
- Date: July 17, 2015
- Venue: Mohegan Sun Arena
- City: Uncasville, Connecticut
- Attendance: 7,610

Bellator 140: Lima vs. Koreshkov took place July 17, 2015 at Mohegan Sun Arena in Uncasville, Connecticut. The event aired live in prime time on Spike TV.

Background

This event was headlined by a Welterweight Championship fight between current champion Douglas Lima and two-time tournament winner Andrey Koreshkov.

Results

Main Card (Spike TV)
Weight class				Method	Round	Time	Notes
Welterweight	Andrey Koreshkov	def.	Douglas Lima (c)	Decision (unanimous) (48-47, 50-45, 50-45)	5	5:00	(Note: For the Bellator Welterweight Championship.)
Catchweight (173 lb)	Paul Daley	def.	Dennis Olson	TKO (punches)	2	1:12
Welterweight	Brennan Ward	def.	Roger Carroll	KO (punch)	1	2:06
Welterweight	Chris Honeycutt	vs.	Paul Bradley	No Contest (accidental headbutt)	2	2:47
Welterweight	Michael Page	def.	Rudy Bears	KO (punch)	1	1:05
Preliminary Card (Spike.com)
Lightweight	Dean Hancock	def.	Alex Dunworth	TKO (corner stoppage)	2	2:14
Women's Catchweight (128.5 lb)	Kaline Medeiros	def.	Sarah Payant	Submission (kimura)	1	3:24
Catchweight (160 lb)	Ryan Quinn	def.	Waylon Lowe	Submission (guillotine choke)	2	2:47
Flyweight	Remo Cardarelli	def.	Billy Giovanella	Decision (unanimous) (30-27, 29-28, 29-28)	3	5:00
Catchweight (138.3 lb)	Kin Moy	def.	Blair Tugman	Submission (triangle choke)	3	3:01
Heavyweight	Parker Porter	def.	Eric Bedard	Submission (americana)	2	2:51
Welterweight	Ilya Kotau	def.	Nicholas Sergiacomi	Submission (rear-naked choke)	1	2:17

== Bellator 141 ==
Bellator 141: Guillard vs. Girtz
- Date: August 28, 2015
- Venue: Pechanga Resort and Casino
- City: Temecula, California
- Attendance: 1,200
- Total gate: $89,549
- Total purse: $275,992

Bellator 141: Guillard vs. Girtz took place August 28, 2015 at the Pechanga Resort and Casino in Temecula, California. The event aired live in prime time on Spike TV.

Background

The event was headlined by a lightweight bout between debuting UFC veteran Melvin Guillard and Bellator MMA veteran Brandon Girtz.

Results

Main Card (Spike TV)
Weight class				Method	Round	Time	Notes
Lightweight	Brandon Girtz	def.	Melvin Guillard	Decision (split) (29-27, 28-29, 29-27)	3	5:00
Lightweight	Patricky Freire	def.	Saad Awad	Decision (unanimous) (30-27, 30-27, 30-27)	3	5:00
Heavyweight	Justin Wren	def.	Josh Burns	Decision (unanimous) (30-27, 30-26, 30-26)	3	5:00
Women's Featherweight	Marloes Coenen	def.	Arlene Blencowe	Submission (armbar)	2	3:23
Preliminary Card (Spike.com)
Women's Flyweight	Ilima-Lei Macfarlane	def.	Maria Rios	Decision (split) (28-29, 29-28, 29-28)	3	5:00
Lightweight	Brent Primus	def.	Derek Anderson	Decision (split) (28-29, 29-27, 29-28)	3	5:00
Middleweight	A.J. Matthews	def.	Emiliano Sordi	TKO (retirement)	1	5:00
Postliminary Card (Dark Bouts)
Welterweight	Johnny Cisneros	def.	Gabriel Miglioli	Decision (unanimous)	3	5:00
Light Heavyweight	Luc Bondole	def.	Ray Sloan	Decision (unanimous)	3	5:00
Women's Featherweight	Adrienna Jenkins	def.	Lissette Neri	TKO (strikes)	1	2:38
Welterweight	Curtis Millender	def.	Steven Ciacco	Decision (unanimous)	3	5:00
Featherweight	A.J. McKee	def.	James Barnes	KO (punches)	1	1:42

== Bellator 142 ==
Bellator MMA & Glory: Dynamite 1
- Date: September 19, 2015
- Venue: SAP Center
- City: San Jose, California
- Attendance: 11,732
- Total gate: $715,000
- Total purse: $653,750

== Bellator 143 ==
Bellator 143: Warren vs. Davis
- Date: September 25, 2015
- Venue: State Farm Arena
- City: Hidalgo, Texas
- Attendance: 3,756
- Total gate: $201,090

Bellator 143: Warren vs. Davis took place on September 25, 2015 at the State Farm Arena in Hidalgo, Texas. The event aired live in prime time on Spike TV.

Background

The event was headlined by a bantamweight bout between former Bellator Bantamweight champion Joe Warren and WEC veteran LC Davis.

Ryan Couture was scheduled to face Nick Gonzalez on this card. However, Gonzalez weighed in at 172.75 pounds, over sixteen pounds past the lightweight limit, and the fight was cancelled.

Results

Main Card (Spike TV)
Weight class				Method	Round	Time	Notes
Bantamweight	Joe Warren	def.	LC Davis	Decision (unanimous) (30-27, 30-27, 30-27)	3	5:00
Middleweight	Kendall Grove	def.	Joey Beltran	TKO (punches)	3	2:27
Featherweight	Emmanuel Sanchez	def.	Henry Corrales	Decision (split) (30-27, 27-30, 29-28)	3	5:00
Heavyweight	Vinicius Queiroz	def.	Ewerton Teixeira	Submission (arm-triangle choke)	2	4:00
Preliminary Card (Spike.com)
Light Heavyweight	Abdul Razak Alhassan	def.	Bryce Meija	KO (punch)	1	1:26
Bantamweight	Amador Ramirez	def.	Saul Elizondo	Decision (unanimous) (29-28, 29-28, 29-28)	3	5:00
Bantamweight	Steve Garcia	def.	Eduardo Bustillos	TKO (punches)	1	4:59
Bantamweight	Darrion Caldwell	def.	Shawn Bunch	Submission (rear-naked choke)	1	2:35
Heavyweight	Dan Charles	def.	Chase Gormley	KO (punches)	2	4:35
Featherweight	John Teixeira	def.	Gleristone Santos	Decision (split) (29-28, 28-29, 29-28)	3	5:00
Lightweight	Jared Chaffee	def.	Guilherme Farias	Submission (guillotine choke)	1	0:39
Welterweight	Jose Flores	def.	Gilbert Jimenez	TKO (body kicks)	1	2:22

== Bellator 144 ==
Bellator 144: Halsey vs. Carvalho
- Date: October 23, 2015
- Venue: Mohegan Sun Arena
- City: Uncasville, Connecticut
- Attendance: 6,009

Bellator 144: Halsey vs. Carvalho took place October 23, 2015 at the Mohegan Sun Arena in Uncasville, Connecticut. The event aired live in prime time on Spike TV.

Background

The main event featured a vacant Bellator Middleweight Championship bout between undefeated former champion Brandon Halsey and top contender Rafael Carvalho.

Results

Fight Card
Weight class				Method	Round	Time	Notes
Middleweight	Rafael Carvalho	def.	Brandon Halsey	TKO (body kick)	2	1:42	(Note: For the vacant Bellator Middleweight Championship.)
Welterweight	Brennan Ward	def.	Dennis Olson	TKO (punches)	1	4:37
Featherweight	Goiti Yamauchi	def.	Isao Kobayashi	Submission (rear-naked choke)	3	3:50
Welterweight	Michael Page	def.	Charlie Ontiveros	TKO (elbows)	1	3:20
Preliminary Card (Spike.com)
Catchweight (165 pounds)	Damien Trites	def.	Keenan Raymond	Submission (Kimura)	2	1:17
Welterweight	Kemran Lachinov	def.	Ilya Kotau	Submission (kneebar)	2	2:57
Bantamweight	Kin Moy	def.	Walter Smith-Cotito	Submission (rear naked choke)	3	3:53
Catchweight (130 lb)	Billy Giovanella	def.	Brandon Polcare	Submission (triangle choke)	1	2:19
Featherweight	Matt Bessette	def.	Kevin Roddy	Submission (heel hook)	1	3:47
Heavyweight	Kevin Haley	def.	Mike Zichelle	Decision (unanimous)	3	5:00
Welterweight	Matt Secor	def.	Jeremie Holloway	Submission (heel hook)	2	4:54
Catchweight (150 pounds)	Marius Enache	def.	Pete Rogers Jr.	Submission (scarf hold americana)	2	2:37
Lightweight	Sam Watford	def.	TJ Hepburn	Decision (unanimous)	3	5:00

== Bellator 145 ==
Bellator 145: Vengeance
- Date: November 6, 2015
- Venue: Scottrade Center
- City: St. Louis, Missouri
- Attendance: 5,259
- Total gate: $361,458

Bellator 145: Vengeance took place November 6, 2015 at the Scottrade Center in St. Louis, Missouri. The event aired live in prime time on Spike TV.

Background

The event was headlined by a Featherweight Championship trilogy fight between current champion Patrício Freire and former champion Daniel Mason-Straus.

The co-main event featured a Lightweight Championship fight between current champion Will Brooks and Season 10 Lightweight Tournament winner Marcin Held.

Michael Chandler rematched David Rickels, whom he knocked out at Bellator 97 in July 2013. Bobby Lashley looked to avenge a contentious May 2012 Super Fight League decision loss to James Thompson.

Results

Main Card (Spike)
Weight class				Method	Round	Time	Notes
Featherweight	Daniel Mason-Straus	def.	Patrício Freire (c)	Decision (unanimous) (49-46, 48-47, 48-47)	5	5:00	(Note: For the Bellator Featherweight Championship.)
Lightweight	Will Brooks (c)	def.	Marcin Held	Decision (unanimous) (50-45, 49-46, 49-46)	5	5:00	(Note: For the Bellator Lightweight Championship.)
Lightweight	Michael Chandler	def.	David Rickels	TKO (punches)	2	3:05
Heavyweight	Bobby Lashley	def.	James Thompson	TKO (punches)	1	0:54
Featherweight	Emmanuel Sanchez	def.	Justin Lawrence	Decision (split) (28-29, 29-28, 29-28)	3	5:00
Preliminary Card (Spike.com)
Featherweight	Rashard Lovelace	def.	Brandon Lowe	TKO (strikes)	1	2:07	(Note: Bout was not streamed on Spike.com.)
Catchweight (140 lb)	Fazlo Mulabitinovic	def.	Scott Ettling	Submission (armbar)	1	1:52
Middleweight	Kain Royer	def.	Clay Mitchell	Submission (kneebar)	1	3:41
Heavyweight	Augusto Sakai	def.	Alex Huddleston	Decision (unanimous) (29-28, 29-28, 29-28)	3	5:00
Welterweight	Adam Meredith	def.	Jordan Dowdy	Submission (rear-naked choke)	1	1:54
Welterweight	Kyle Kurtz	def.	Steven Mann	Submission (triangle armbar)	1	2:59
Catchweight (160 lb)	Garrett Gross	def.	Jeff Crotty	Decision (unanimous) (30-27, 30-27, 30-27)	3	5:00
Welterweight	Chel Erwin-Davis	def.	Adam Cella	TKO (punches)	3	0:35

== Bellator 146 ==
Bellator 146: Kato vs. Manhoef
- Date: November 20, 2015
- Venue: WinStar World Casino
- City: Thackerville, Oklahoma
- Attendance: 1,246
- Total gate: $91,095

Bellator 146: Kato vs. Manhoef took place November 20, 2015 at the WinStar World Casino in Thackerville, Oklahoma. The event aired live in prime time on Spike TV.

Background

The event was headlined by a middleweight bout between Hisaki Kato and Strikeforce veteran Melvin Manhoef.

Results

Fight Card
Weight class				Method	Round	Time	Notes
Middleweight	Melvin Manhoef	def.	Hisaki Kato	KO (punch)	1	3:43
Lightweight	Brandon Girtz	def.	Derek Campos	KO (punches)	1	0:37
Featherweight	Bubba Jenkins	def.	Jordan Parsons	Decision (split) (29-28, 28-29, 30-27)	3	5:00
Welterweight	Chidi Njokuani	def.	Ricky Rainey	Decision (unanimous) (29-28, 29-28, 29-28)	3	5:00
Light Heavyweight	Guilherme Viana	def.	Houston Alexander	TKO (doctor stoppage)	2	5:00
Preliminary Card (Spike.com)
Featherweight	Stephen Banaszak	def.	George Pacurariu	Submission (guillotine choke)	1	3:42
Middleweight	Francisco France	def.	Ben Reiter	Submission (rear-naked choke)	2	1:08
Women's Featherweight	Julia Budd	def.	Roberta Rovel	Decision (unanimous) (30-26, 30-27, 30-27)	3	5:00
Welterweight	André Santos	def.	Josh Neer	Decision (unanimous) (29-28, 29-28, 29-28)	3	5:00
Women's Featherweight	Arlene Blencowe	def.	Gabby Holloway	Decision (split) (29-28, 28-29, 29-28)	3	5:00
Heavyweight	Alonzo Menifield	def.	Zach Rosol	TKO (punches)	1	0:38
Postliminary Card (Dark Bouts)
Catchweight (150 lb)	Chris Jones	def.	Treston Thomison	Decision (Unanimous)	3	5:00
Bantamweight	Klayton Mai	def.	Roshaun Jones	Submission (Guillotine)	1	2:25
Welterweight	Codale Ford	def.	Justin Patterson	Submission (rear-naked choke)	1	2:17
Catchweight (195 Pounds)	Bubba McDaniel	def.	Kenyon Jackson	TKO (punches)	2	4:14

== Bellator 147 ==
Bellator 147: Thomson vs. Villaseca
- Date: December 4, 2015
- Venue: San Jose State University
- City: San Jose, California, U.S
- Attendance: 2,076
- Total gate: $123,298
- Total purse: $196,200

Bellator 147: Thomson vs. Villaseca took place December 4, 2015 at San Jose State University in San Jose, California. The event aired live in prime time on Spike TV.

Results

Fight Card
Weight class				Method	Round	Time	Notes
Lightweight	Josh Thomson	def.	Pablo Villaseca	TKO (punches)	2	3:59
Featherweight	Daniel Weichel	def.	Georgi Karakhanyan	Decision (unanimous) (30-27, 30-27, 30-27)	3	5:00
Lightweight	Derek Anderson	def.	Patricky Freire	Decision (split) (29-28, 28-29, 29-28)	3	5:00
Lightweight	Adam Piccolotti	def.	Mario Soto	Submission (rear-naked choke)	2	3:25
Light Heavyweight	Brian Rogers	def.	Virgil Zwicker	Submission (arm-triangle choke)	2	4:38
Preliminary Card (Spike.com)
Flyweight	Anthony Do	def.	Dustin Moore	TKO (Punches)	1	2:05
Featherweight	Adin Duenas	def.	Anthony Taylor	Submission (Rear-Naked Choke)	1	2:43
Bantamweight	Bronson Mohika	def.	Jose Perez	Decision (Unanimous)	3	5:00
Bantamweight	Jeremiah Labiano	def.	Alvin Cacdac	Decision (Unanimous)	3	5:00
Featherweight	Erick Sanchez	def.	Thomas Diagne	TKO (Punches)	3	1:22
Bantamweight	Gabriel Carrasco	def.	Khomkrit Niimi	TKO (elbows)	1	3:19
Middleweight	Brandon Hester	def.	Idris Wasi	Decision (unanimous) (30-27, 30-25, 30-24)	3	5:00
Featherweight	A.J. McKee	def.	JT Donaldson	TKO (knee and punches)	1	3:19
Catchweight (177 lb)	Nick Barnes	def.	James Terry	Submission (rear-naked choke)	1	2:48
