= Eduardo Dantas =

Brazilian mixed martial arts fighter

- Born: 3 February 1989 (age 37); Rio de Janeiro, Brazil
- Other names: DuDu
- Height: 5 ft 10 in (1.78 m)
- Weight: 135 lb (61 kg; 9.6 st)
- Division: Bantamweight; Featherweight (2019–present)
- Reach: 69 in (175 cm)
- Fighting out of: Rio de Janeiro, Brazil
- Team: Nova União
- Rank: 2nd degree black belt in Brazilian jiu-jitsu
- Years active: 2007–present

Mixed martial arts record
- Total: 31
- Wins: 23
- By knockout: 5
- By submission: 7
- By decision: 11
- Losses: 8
- By knockout: 3
- By decision: 4
- By disqualification: 1

Other information
- Mixed martial arts record from Sherdog

Eduardo Dantas (born 3 February 1989) is a Brazilian professional mixed martial artist who competes in the bantamweight division. A professional MMA competitor since 2007, Dantas mostly fought for the Bellator MMA where he was the former two-time Bellator Bantamweight World champion. He has also fought in Shooto, where he has competed for the Shooto 132-pound world title. From January 2012 to October 2017, he was ranked in the top 10 bantamweights in the world by Fight Matrix, getting as high as #3 in January 2014.

== Mixed martial arts career ==
=== Background ===
Dantas trains with Nova União. Dantas has also shown a tendency in his career to prefer the striking game.

=== Shooto Brazil ===
After compiling a record of 3–1, including a win over Shooto champ Shinichi Kojima, Dantas main evented Shooto Brazil 5. Dantas attempted multiple striking techniques including flying knees, before finishing his opponent with punches to the stomach.

Soon after, Dantas won the Shooto South American 132 lb title, which he owned up going into his fight against Ueda.

Dantas would next compete for the Shooto 132-pound world title. At that time, his opponent, Masakatsu Ueda was ranked as the #2 bantamweight in the world.

In a three-round bout, Dantas was able to rock his opponent on a number of occasions, but suffered a point deduction after holding the ropes to prevent a takedown from Ueda. Dantas would go on to lose the bout 29–28, 29–28, 30–28.

Dantas later bounced back with a TKO victory over Carlos Roberto in the second round. This was followed by a submission victory at The Way of Shooto 3 in May 2010.

Dantas was next set to defend his Shooto South American 132 lb Championship in a rematch with Luis Alberto Nogueira, but the bout was cancelled.

=== Bellator Fighting Championships ===
In the fall of 2011, Dantas entered Bellator's Season Five Bantamweight Tournament. He defeated Wilson Reis via second-round KO in the quarter-final round and Ed West by split decision in the semi-final round in order to advance to the finals.

In the finals, he defeated Alexis Vila via unanimous decision to become the tournament champion.

==== Bellator Bantamweight Champion ====
Eduardo challenged champion Zach Makovsky at Bellator 65 on 13 April 2012 for the Bellator Bantamweight title. He won the fight via technical submission in the second round.

In August 2012, Dantas faced Tyson Nam in a fight outside of Bellator. Dantas had been permitted by Bellator to fight against Nam, as the fight took place outside of the United States and wouldn't be aired on television in the U.S. either. The two faced off at Shooto Brazil 33: Fight for BOPE II in an event that served as a fundraiser for the "Batalhao de Operacoes Policiais Especiais" (Special Police Operations Battalion), which was Rio de Janeiro's military special forces. Although Dantas rocked Nam early with a knee, he was knocked out in the first round by a counter right hook after he rushed forward aggressively.

In February 2013, Dantas defended his title against, good friend and teammate, Marcos Galvão at Bellator 89. He finished Galvão in the 2nd round via knock out.

It was reported that Dantas had injured his ankle and won't be able to return until 2014 to defend his belt against Rafael Silva. It was announced on 9 January 2014 that Dantas will defend his belt against Rafael Silva on 7 March 2014. However, Silva suffered a knee injury and was replaced by runner-up Anthony Leone. Dantas successfully defended his title, winning via rear-naked choke submission in the second round.

Dantas was scheduled to face Bellator Season 9 Bantamweight Tournament winner Joe Warren at Bellator 118. However, Dantas suffered a head injury and withdrew from the bout. Rafael Silva then faced Warren for the interim title.

Dantas faced Joe Warren in a title unification bout on 10 October 2014 at Bellator 128. He lost the fight and bantamweight championship title via unanimous decision.

==== Back to contention ====
Dantas was expected to face Mike Richman on 27 March 2015 at Bellator 135. However, the bout was removed from the fight card after Richman suffered an undisclosed injury. The fight eventually took place at Bellator 137 on 15 May 2015, despite Richman not making weight. Dantas won the back-and-forth fight by unanimous decision. In addition, Richman failed a post-fight drug screening.

==== Second title reign ====
Dantas was originally scheduled to face former teammate, Marcos Galvão in a rematch for the Bellator Bantamweight Championship title at Bellator 144, but was postponed after an injury to Dantas. The rematch was then scheduled to take place at Bellator 150 on 26 February 2016, however, the bout was again postponed, this time due to an illness suffered by Galvão. The bout eventually took place on 17 June 2016 at Bellator 156, in which Dantas regained the championship, winning by unanimous decision.

In his first title defense during his second stint as champion, Dantas faced Joe Warren in a rematch in the main event at Bellator 166 on 2 December 2016. Dantas was successful this time against Warren, winning the fight via majority decision.

Dantas was expected to make his second title defense at Bellator 177 on 14 April 2017, facing off against Darrion Caldwell. However, after an undisclosed injury to Caldwell, Dantas instead faced Leandro Higo at the event. The bout was changed to a non-title catchweight bout after Higo missed weight. Dantas won via split decision after three rounds.

The title bout between Dantas and Caldwell was rescheduled for Bellator 184 on 6 October 2017. Dantas lost the fight and his title by unanimous decision.

==== After the second title reign ====
Dantas next faced former UFC title contender Michael McDonald on 13 July 2018 at Bellator 202. He lost the fight via knockout in the first round. In the course of fight, Dantas was dropped early by a right hand from McDonald. As he was falling, he broke his right fibula.

He was then scheduled to fight Manny Vazquez at Bellator 215 on 15 February 2019. However, Vazquez withdrew from the bout citing an injury and was replaced by Toby Misech. Dantas won the fight via unanimous decision.

==== Move up to featherweight ====
On 28 May 2019, it was announced that Dantas would move up to featherweight and face Juan Archuleta at Bellator 222 on 14 June 2019. He lost the fight via knockout in the second round. His contract expired after the fight, making him a free agent.

=== Post-Bellator career ===
Dantas signed a contract with Elite MMA Championship and was scheduled to compete at EMC 7 on 3 July 2021. However, the bout was cancelled due to COVID-19 pandemic travel restrictions.

==== Return to Shooto Brazil ====
On 13 July 2021, it was announced that Dantas was returning to Shooto Brazil to face Michel Costa on 24 July 2021 in Rio de Janeiro. He won the bout via arm-triangle in the first round.

Dantas was scheduled to face Jose Johnson at Fury FC 53 on November 14, 2021. However, Dantas withdrew from the bout due to travel issues and was replaced by Mo Miller.

Dantas faced José Alday at FAC 12 on February 6, 2022. Dantas won the bout after knocking out his opponent with a head kick in the second round.

== Grappling career ==
Dantas is scheduled to face Umar Nurmagomedov in a no-gi featherweight grappling match on October 25, 2024, in the main event at ADXC 7.

== Championships and accomplishments ==
- Bellator Fighting Championships
  - Bellator Bantamweight World Championship (Two times; former)
    - Three successful title defenses (overall)
      - Two successful title defenses (first reign)
      - One successful title defense (second reign)
  - Bellator Season 5 Bantamweight Tournament Winner
- Shooto Brazil
  - Shooto South American Featherweight Championship (One time; former)

== Mixed martial arts record ==
Professional record breakdown
31 matches	23 wins	8 losses
By knockout	5	3
By submission	7	0
By decision	11	4
By disqualification	0	1

Res.	Record	Opponent	Method	Event	Date	Round	Time	Location	Notes
Loss	23–8	Denis Lavrentyev	Decision (unanimous)	RCC 15	13 May 2023	3	5:00	Yekaterinburg, Russia	
Win	23–7	José Alday	KO (head kick)	FAC 12	6 February 2022	2	4:25	Independence, Missouri, United States	
Win	22–7	Michel Costa	Submission (arm-triangle choke)	Shooto Brazil 107	24 July 2021	1	3:22	Rio de Janeiro, Brazil	
Loss	21–7	Juan Archuleta	KO (punch)	Bellator 222	14 June 2019	2	4:59	New York City, New York, United States	Featherweight bout.
Win	21–6	Toby Misech	Decision (unanimous)	Bellator 215	15 February 2019	3	5:00	Uncasville, Connecticut, United States	
Loss	20–6	Michael McDonald	KO (punches)	Bellator 202	13 July 2018	1	0:58	Thackerville, Oklahoma, United States	
Loss	20–5	Darrion Caldwell	Decision (unanimous)	Bellator 184	6 October 2017	5	5:00	Thackerville, Oklahoma, United States	Lost the Bellator Bantamweight World Championship.
Win	20–4	Leandro Higo	Decision (split)	Bellator 177	14 April 2017	3	5:00	Budapest, Hungary	Non-title bout; Higo missed weight (139 lbs).
Win	19–4	Joe Warren	Decision (majority)	Bellator 166	2 December 2016	5	5:00	Thackerville, Oklahoma, United States	Defended the Bellator Bantamweight World Championship.
Win	18–4	Marcos Galvão	Decision (unanimous)	Bellator 156	17 June 2016	5	5:00	Fresno, California, United States	Won the Bellator Bantamweight World Championship.
Win	17–4	Mike Richman	Decision (unanimous)	Bellator 137	15 May 2015	3	5:00	Temecula, California, United States	
Loss	16–4	Joe Warren	Decision (unanimous)	Bellator 128	10 October 2014	5	5:00	Thackerville, Oklahoma, United States	Lost the Bellator Bantamweight World Championship
Win	16–3	Anthony Leone	Submission (rear-naked choke)	Bellator 111	7 March 2014	2	2:04	Thackerville, Oklahoma, United States	Defended the Bellator Bantamweight Championship.
Win	15–3	Marcos Galvão	KO (punches)	Bellator 89	14 February 2013	2	3:01	Charlotte, North Carolina, United States	Defended the Bellator Bantamweight World Championship.
Loss	14–3	Tyson Nam	KO (punch)	Shooto Brazil 33: Fight for BOPE 2	25 August 2012	1	1:36	Rio de Janeiro, Brazil	
Win	14–2	Zach Makovsky	Technical Submission (arm-triangle choke)	Bellator 65	13 April 2012	2	3:26	Atlantic City, New Jersey, United States	Won the Bellator Bantamweight World Championship.
Win	13–2	Alexis Vila	Decision (unanimous)	Bellator 59	26 November 2011	3	5:00	Atlantic City, New Jersey, United States	Bellator Season 5 Bantamweight Tournament Final.
Win	12–2	Ed West	Decision (split)	Bellator 55	22 October 2011	3	5:00	Yuma, Arizona, United States	Bellator Season 5 Bantamweight Tournament Semifinal.
Win	11–2	Wilson Reis	KO (flying knee and punches)	Bellator 51	24 September 2011	2	1:02	Canton, Ohio, United States	Bellator Season 5 Bantamweight Tournament Quarterfinal.
Win	10–2	Samuel de Souza	Submission (armbar)	Shooto - Brazil 20	11 December 2010	1	0:20	Rio de Janeiro, Brazil	Defended Shooto South American 132 lb Title
Win	9–2	Hiromasa Ougikubo	Submission (rear-naked choke)	Shooto: The Way of Shooto 3: Like a Tiger, Like a Dragon	30 May 2010	3	1:21	Tokyo, Japan	
Win	8–2	Carlos Roberto	TKO (punches)	Shooto Brazil 14	26 November 2009	2	0:46	Flamengo, Rio de Janeiro	
Loss	7–2	Masakatsu Ueda	Decision (unanimous)	Shooto: Revolutionary Exchanges 1: Undefeated	19 July 2009	3	5:00	Tokyo, Japan	For the Shooto Featherweight Championship.
Win	7–1	Mauricio Antonio Santos Jr.	Decision (unanimous)	World Fighting Combat	24 April 2009	3	5:00	Camboinhas, Brazil	
Win	6–1	Luis Alberto Nogueira	Submission (armbar)	Shooto Brazil 9	29 November 2008	2	1:41	Fortaleza, Ceará	Won the vacant Shooto South America Featherweight (123 - 132 lbs.) Championship.
Win	5–1	Juan Tessari	Submission (rear-naked choke)	Shooto Brazil 7	28 June 2008	2	2:33	Rio de Janeiro, Brazil	
Win	4–1	Hudson Rocha	TKO (punches)	Shooto Brazil 5	26 January 2008	1	N/A	Rio de Janeiro, Brazil	
Win	3–1	Shinichi Kojima	Decision (unanimous)	Shooto: Back To Our Roots 6	8 November 2007	3	5:00	Tokyo, Japan	
Loss	2–1	Aritano Silva Barbosa	DQ (illegal soccer kicks)	Cassino Fight 4	15 September 2007	1	3:31	Manaus, Brazil	
Win	2–0	Fabio Oliveira	Decision (unanimous)	Shooto Brazil 3	7 July 2007	3	5:00	Rio de Janeiro, Brazil	
Win	1–0	William Porfirio	Decision (unanimous)	Shooto Brazil 2	24 March 2007	3	5:00	Flamengo, Rio de Janeiro	

== See also ==
- List of male mixed martial artists
