= Shawn Bunch =

American mixed martial arts fighter

- Born: March 19, 1983 (age 43); Columbus, Georgia, U.S.
- Other names: Bunch The Great
- Nationality: American
- Height: 5 ft 5 in (165 cm)
- Weight: 135 lb (61 kg; 9 st 9 lb)
- Division: Bantamweight (135 lb)
- Reach: 66 in (168 cm)
- Style: Freestyle wrestling
- Fighting out of: San Jose, California, U.S.
- Team: American Kickboxing Academy
- Wrestling: NCAA Division I Wrestling; Olympic Alternate (freestyle wrestling)
- Years active: 2012–present

Mixed martial arts record
- Total: 17
- Wins: 11
- By knockout: 3
- By decision: 8
- Losses: 6
- By knockout: 1
- By submission: 2
- By decision: 3

Other information
- University: Edinboro University of Pennsylvania
- Notable school: Leavenworth High School
- Mixed martial arts record from Sherdog

Shawn Bunch (born March 19, 1983) is an American mixed martial artist who competed in Bellator's bantamweight division.

== Wrestling career ==
Bunch competed in high school for Leavenworth High School in Leavenworth, Kansas and in college for Edinboro University, where he was a four-time NCAA qualifier and two-time All-American. He was also a U.S. national and Pan American champion, and two-time Olympic alternate at 133 lb (60 kg). In June 2012, he lost to Coleman Scott at a wrestle-off, which decided the final Olympic roster spot.

== Mixed martial arts career ==
=== Bellator MMA ===
Bunch made his professional and promotional debut on November 30, 2012 at Bellator 82 against Chad Coon. He won via unanimous decision (30-27, 30-27, 30-27).

Bunch was expected to face Steve Garcia on July 31, 2013, at Bellator 97. However, Garcia was replaced by Russell Wilson due to injury. Bunch defeated Wilson via split decision (29-28 Bunch, 29-28 Wilson, 29-28 Bunch).

Bunch/Garcia eventually took place on October 25, 2013, at Bellator 105. He had his first mixed martial arts defeat via TKO in the third round.

After a long layoff, Bunch faced David Duran at Bellator 127 on October 3, 2014. He won the fight via KO in the first round.

Bunch faced Rolando Perez at Bellator 137 on May 15, 2015. He won the fight by unanimous decision.

Bunch next faced Darrion Caldwell at Bellator 143 on September 25, 2015. He lost the fight via submission in the first round.

Bellator MMA announced on October 27, 2020, that Bunch had been released from the promotion.

=== Post-Bellator career ===
After the release, Bunch signed with UAE Warriors and faced Rany Saadeh at UAE Warriors 22 on September 4, 2021. Bunch won the bout via split decision.

Bunch faced Firdavs Khasanov on January 28, 2022, at Eagle FC 44. He won the bout via unanimous decision.

Bunch faced Adi Alić on May 20, 2022, at Eagle FC 47. He lost the fight via unanimous decision.

== Championships and accomplishments ==
=== Amateur wrestling ===
- FILA/USA Wrestling (Freestyle wrestling)
  - World Olympic Games Qualifying Tournament: 3rd place (2012)
  - Pan American Olympic Qualifying Tournament: 3rd place (2012)
  - Pan American Championships: Gold medal (2007)
  - USA Open: Champion (2010)
  - USA Open: Runner-up (2011)
  - USA Nationals: Champion (2008)
  - USA Nationals: 3rd place (2007)
  - USA Olympic Team Trials: Runner-up (2008)
  - USA World Team Trials: Champion (2009)
  - USA World Team Trials: Runner-up (2011)
  - USA World Team Trials: Runner-up (2010)
  - USA World Team Trials: 4th place (2007)
- National Collegiate Athletic Association
  - NCAA Division I All-American out of Edinboro University (2005–06)
  - NCAA Division I 133 lb: Runner-up out of Edinboro University (2005)
  - NCAA Division I 133 lb: 3rd place out of Edinboro University (2006)
  - Four-time NCAA Division I qualifier (2002–03, 2005–06)

=== Mixed martial arts ===
- Conquer Fighting Championships
  - Fight of the Night (1 Time)

== Mixed martial arts record ==
Professional record breakdown
17 matches	11 wins	6 losses
By knockout	3	1
By submission	0	2
By decision	8	3

Res.	Record	Opponent	Method	Event	Date	Round	Time	Location	Notes
Loss	11–6	Adi Alić	Decision (unanimous)	Eagle FC 47	May 20, 2022	3	5:00	Miami, Florida, United States	
Win	11–5	Firdavs Khasanov	Decision (unanimous)	Eagle FC 44	January 28, 2022	3	5:00	Miami, Florida, United States	
Win	10–5	Rany Saadeh	Decision (split)	UAE Warriors 22	September 4, 2021	3	5:00	Abu Dhabi, United Arab Emirates	
Loss	9–5	Keith Lee	Decision (unanimous)	Bellator 239	February 21, 2020	3	5:00	Thackerville, Oklahoma, United States	
Loss	9–4	Leandro Higo	Submission (guillotine choke)	Bellator 228	September 28, 2019	2	4:34	Inglewood, California, United States	
Win	9–3	Dominic Mazzotta	Decision (unanimous)	Bellator 219	March 29, 2019	3	5:00	Temecula, California, United States	
Win	8–3	Joe Warren	TKO (submission to punches)	Bellator 210	November 30, 2018	1	1:42	Thackerville, Oklahoma, United States	
Win	7–3	Rodrigo Lima	Decision (unanimous)	Conquer Fighting Championships 4	June 24, 2017	3	5:00	Richmond, California United States	
Win	6–3	Josh San Diego	Decision (unanimous)	Dragon House 24	November 12, 2016	3	5:00	San Francisco, California United States	
Win	5–3	Khomkrit Niimi	TKO (punches)	Conquer Fighting Championships 2	April 30, 2016	1	3:37	Richmond, California United States	
Loss	4–3	Stephan Cervantes	Decision (split)	Conquer Fighting Championships 1	November 21, 2015	3	5:00	Richmond, California United States	Fight of the Night
Loss	4–2	Darrion Caldwell	Submission (rear-naked choke)	Bellator 143	September 25, 2015	1	2:35	Hidalgo, Texas, United States	
Win	4–1	Rolando Perez	Decision (unanimous)	Bellator 137	May 15, 2015	3	5:00	Temecula, California, United States	
Win	3–1	David Duran	TKO (punches)	Bellator 127	October 3, 2014	1	3:11	Temecula, California, United States	
Loss	2–1	Steve Garcia	TKO (punches)	Bellator 105	October 25, 2013	3	3:29	Rio Rancho, New Mexico, United States	
Win	2–0	Russell Wilson	Decision (split)	Bellator 97	July 31, 2013	3	5:00	Rio Rancho, New Mexico, United States	
Win	1–0	Chad Coon	Decision (unanimous)	Bellator 82	November 30, 2012	3	5:00	Mount Pleasant, Michigan, United States	
