= Leandro Higo =

Brazilian mixed martial arts (MMA) fighter

- Born: January 19, 1989 (age 37); Rio Grande Do Norte, Brazil
- Other names: Alter
- Height: 5 ft 8 in (1.73 m)
- Weight: 145 lb (66 kg; 10 st 5 lb)
- Division: Featherweight; Bantamweight
- Reach: 72 in (183 cm)
- Fighting out of: Rio Grande Do Norte, Brazil
- Team: Pitbull Brothers; Fight Ready
- Rank: Black belt in Brazilian jiu-jitsu
- Years active: 2006–present

Mixed martial arts record
- Total: 31
- Wins: 23
- By knockout: 3
- By submission: 13
- By decision: 7
- Losses: 8
- By knockout: 2
- By submission: 1
- By decision: 5

Other information
- Mixed martial arts record from Sherdog

Leandro Higo (born January 19, 1989) is a Brazilian mixed martial artist who competes in the Bantamweight division of Bellator MMA. A professional competitor since 2006, he has also competed for Resurrection Fighting Alliance and Legacy Fighting Alliance.

== Mixed martial arts career ==
=== Early career ===
Higo made his Resurrection Fighting Alliance debut on August 21, 2015 vs. Terrion Ware at RFA 29, winning by rear-naked choke at the end of round 3. Following a first round victory over Melvin Blumer at RFA 32, he won the RFA Bantamweight title with a first round rear-naked choke victory against Joey Miolla at RFA 37.

Higo made his debut with Legacy Fighting Alliance in the company's debut at LFA 1: Peterson vs. Higo, defeating Steven Peterson via unanimous decision to win the inaugural LFA Bantamweight Championship.

=== The Ultimate Fighter Brazil ===
Higo competed in the Bantamweight division on The Ultimate Fighter: Brazil 4. He defeated Maycon Silvan in the elimination round via first round arm-triangle choke, but was eliminated in the quarterfinals by Bruno Rodrigues Mesquita via first round rear-naked choke. After Giovanni Santos was forced to leave the season due to an infection, Higo reluctantly accepted to replace Santos to face Matheus Mattos in another quarterfinal bout. However, his rib injury sustained in the previous week's bout with Mesquita worsened and he was forced to withdraw.

=== Bellator MMA ===
Higo made his Bellator debut as a late replacement for Darrion Caldwell against Bantamweight titlist Eduardo Dantas in a non-title bout at Bellator 177, losing via split decision.

Higo faced Joe Taimanglo on October 6, 2017 at Bellator 184, winning via unanimous decision.

Higo earned an opportunity to compete for the Bellator Bantamweight Championship vs. Darrion Caldwell on March 2, 2018 at Bellator 195, losing via first round guillotine choke.

For his next bout, Higo moved up to Featherweight and faced Aaron Pico at Bellator 206 on September 29, 2018. He lost the fight via technical knockout in round one.

After the failed attempt in featherweight division, Higo returned to the bantamweight division to face Shawn Bunch at Bellator 228 on September 28, 2019. He won the fight via submission in the second round. Subsequently he signed a new exclusive, multi-fight contract with Bellator.

Higo was expected to face Johnny Campbell in a bantamweight bout at Bellator 241 on March 13, 2020. However, Campbell withdrew from the bout due to an injury and was replaced by Dominic Mazzotta, the bout continuing as a featherweight bout.

Higo then faced Ricky Bandejas at Bellator 249 on October 15, 2020. Higo missed the contracted weight, but went on to win the bout via second-round submission.

Higo faced Darrion Caldwell at Bellator 259 on May 21, 2021. At the weigh-ins, Higo weighed in at 137.5 pounds, one and a half pounds over the bantamweight non-title fight limit. The bout proceeded at catchweight and Higo was fined a percentage of his purse, which went to Caldwell. Higo won the bout via split decision.

==== Bellator Featherweight World Grand Prix ====
Higo faced Danny Sabatello in the quarter-finals of the Bellator Bantamweight World Grand Prix at Bellator 282 on June 24, 2022. He lost the bout via unanimous decision.

==== Post Grand Prix ====
Higo was scheduled to face James Gallagher on March 10, 2023 at Bellator 292. However, in Mid February, Gallagher pulled out of the bout for unknown reasons.

Higo was scheduled to face Nikita Mikhailov on June 16, 2023 at Bellator 297. However, the bout was scrapped when Mikhailov came down with a sickness. The bout was rescheduled for August 11, 2023 at Bellator 298. Higo won the fight via a guillotine choke submission in the second round.

On short notice, Higo faced James Gallagher on March 22, 2024 at Bellator Champions Series 1. Higo came out victorious via unanimous decision after a strong third round.

Higo was scheduled to challenge Patchy Mix for the Bellator Bantamweight Championship on November 16, 2024, at Bellator Champions Series 6. However, this event was later announced to be cancelled due to unspecified reasons.

=== Professional Fighters League ===
On February 21, 2025, the promotion officially revealed that Higo joined the 2025 PFL Bantamweight Tournament.

In the quarterfinal, Higo was scheduled to face Magomed Magomedov on April 11, 2025, at PFL 2. However, Magomedov withdrew from the tournament due to injury and was replaced by Josh Rettinghouse. In turn, Rettinghouse was not medically cleared and was replaced by Marcirley Alves. He lost the fight via split decision.

The bout with Magomedov was rescheduled and took place on May 2, 2026, at PFL Sioux Falls. At the weigh-ins, Magomedov weighed in at 136.8 pounds, 0.8 pounds over the bantamweight non-title fight limit and he was fined a percentage of his purse, which went to Higo. He lost the fight via split decision.

== Personal life ==
Higo has a son.

== Mixed martial arts record ==
Professional record breakdown
31 matches	23 wins	8 losses
By knockout	3	2
By submission	13	1
By decision	7	5

Res.	Record	Opponent	Method	Event	Date	Round	Time	Location	Notes
Loss	23–8	Magomed Magomedov	Decision (split)	PFL Sioux Falls: Storley vs. Zendeli	May 2, 2026	3	5:00	Sioux Falls, South Dakota, United States	Catchweight (136.8 lb) bout; Magomedov missed weight.
Loss	23–7	Marcirley Alves	Decision (split)	PFL 2 (2025)	April 11, 2025	3	5:00	Orlando, Florida, United States	2025 PFL Bantamweight Tournament Quarterfinal.
Win	23–6	James Gallagher	Decision (unanimous)	Bellator Champions Series 1	March 22, 2024	3	5:00	Belfast, Northern Ireland	Featherweight bout.
Win	22–6	Nikita Mikhailov	Submission (guillotine choke)	Bellator 298	August 11, 2023	2	2:50	Sioux Falls, South Dakota, United States	
Loss	21–6	Danny Sabatello	Decision (unanimous)	Bellator 282	June 24, 2022	5	5:00	Uncasville, Connecticut, United States	Bellator Bantamweight World Grand Prix Quarterfinal.
Win	21–5	Darrion Caldwell	Decision (split)	Bellator 259	May 21, 2021	3	5:00	Uncasville, Connecticut, United States	Catchweight (137.5 lb) bout; Higo missed weight.
Win	20–5	Ricky Bandejas	Submission (rear-naked choke)	Bellator 249	October 15, 2020	2	2:32	Uncasville, Connecticut, United States	Catchweight (139 lbs) bout; Higo missed weight.
Win	19–5	Shawn Bunch	Submission (guillotine choke)	Bellator 228	September 28, 2019	2	4:34	Inglewood, California, United States	
Loss	18–5	Aaron Pico	TKO (elbow and punches)	Bellator 206	September 29, 2018	1	3:19	San Jose, California, United States	Featherweight bout.
Loss	18–4	Darrion Caldwell	Submission (guillotine choke)	Bellator 195	March 2, 2018	1	2:36	Thackerville, Oklahoma, United States	For the Bellator Bantamweight World Championship.
Win	18–3	Joe Taimanglo	Decision (unanimous)	Bellator 184	October 6, 2017	3	5:00	Thackerville, Oklahoma, United States	
Loss	17–3	Eduardo Dantas	Decision (split)	Bellator 177	April 14, 2017	3	5:00	Budapest, Hungary	
Win	17–2	Steven Peterson	Decision (unanimous)	LFA 1	January 13, 2017	5	5:00	Dallas, Texas, United States	Won the inaugural LFA Bantamweight Championship.
Win	16–2	Joey Miolla	Technical Submission (rear-naked choke)	RFA 37	April 15, 2016	1	2:07	Sioux Falls, South Dakota, United States	Won the vacant RFA Bantamweight Championship.
Win	15–2	Melvin Blumer	TKO (punches)	RFA 32	November 6, 2015	1	2:58	Prior Lake, Minnesota, United States	
Win	14–2	Terrion Ware	Submission (rear-naked choke)	RFA 29	August 21, 2015	3	4:58	Sioux Falls, South Dakota, United States	
Win	13–2	Eduardo de Souza Silva	Submission (rear-naked choke)	Coliseu Extreme Fight 7	September 6, 2013	2	2:33	Alagoas, Brazil	
Win	12–2	Francisco Antonio Araujo Rodrigues	Submission (rear-naked choke)	Arena Fight 5	January 18, 2013	1	2:42	Rio Grande Do Norte, Brazil	
Win	11–2	Alex Silva	Decision (unanimous)	Conquista Kombat 1	November 17, 2012	3	5:00	Bahia, Brazil	
Win	10–2	Janailson Kevin Pereira Lima	Submission (rear-naked choke)	Fort MMA 2	April 12, 2013	2	4:04	Rio Grande Do Norte, Brazil	
Loss	9–2	Iliarde Santos	Decision (unanimous)	Jungle Fight 38	April 28, 2012	3	5:00	Pará, Brazil	
Win	9–1	Erinaldo dos Santos Rodrigues	Decision (unanimous)	WFE 11	December 16, 2011	3	5:00	Bahia, Brazil	
Win	8–1	Wagner Campos	Decision (unanimous)	WFE 10	September 16, 2011	3	5:00	Bahia, Brazil	
Loss	7–1	Marcos Vinicius Costa Silva	TKO (retirement)	Recife FC 2	May 20, 2010	2	3:58	Pernambuco, Brazil	
Win	7–0	Dudu Dudu	KO (punch)	Nocaute Fight 1	September 16, 2011	1	3:05	Rio Grande Do Norte, Brazil	
Win	6–0	Gleidson Alves Martins	Submission (triangle armbar)	Guamare Fight 1	March 10, 2009	1	1:45	Rio Grande Do Norte, Brazil	
Win	5–0	Arivaldo Batista da Silva	KO (punch)	Nordeste Fight Vale Tudo 4	July 5, 2008	1	4:12	Rio Grande Do Norte, Brazil	
Win	4–0	Diego Tubarao	Submission (armbar)	Nordeste Fight Vale Tudo 4	July 5, 2008	1	2:50	Rio Grande Do Norte, Brazil	
Win	3–0	Jose Mario Tome	Submission (armbar)	Arena Fight: Limoeiro 4	January 9, 2008	1	0:39	Ceara, Brazil	
Win	2–0	Rodrigo Barbosa	Submission (triangle choke)	MZI: Fight 3	June 21, 2007	2	1:49	Rio Grande Do Norte, Brazil	
Win	1–0	Gilson Gilson	Submission (armbar)	Nordeste Mega Fight Vale Tudo 2	May 4, 2006	2	1:50	Rio Grande Do Norte, Brazil	

== Mixed martial arts exhibition record ==
Professional record breakdown
2 matches	1 win	1 loss
By knockout	0	0
By submission	1	1

Res.	Record	Opponent	Method	Event	Date	Round	Time	Location	Notes
Loss	1–1	Reginaldo Vieira	Submission (rear-naked choke)	The Ultimate Fighter: Brazil 4	May 17, 2015 (airdate)	1	4:04	Las Vegas, Nevada, United States	The Ultimate Fighter: Brazil 4 Quarterfinals round
Win	1–0	Maycon Silvan	Submission (arm triangle choke)	The Ultimate Fighter: Brazil 4	April 12, 2015 (airdate)	1	3:17	Las Vegas, Nevada, United States	The Ultimate Fighter: Brazil 4 Entry round

== See also ==
- List of current Bellator fighters
- List of male mixed martial artists
