= James Gallagher (fighter) =

Irish mixed martial artist (born 1996)

- Born: October 24, 1996 (age 30); Strabane, County Tyrone, Northern Ireland
- Height: 5 ft 9 in (1.75 m)
- Weight: 145 lb (66 kg; 10 st 5 lb)
- Division: Featherweight (2015–2018, 2023–present); Bantamweight (2018–2021)
- Reach: 67 in (170 cm)
- Fighting out of: Dublin, Ireland
- Team: Straight Blast Gym Ireland
- Years active: 2017–present

Mixed martial arts record
- Total: 18
- Wins: 13
- By submission: 10
- By decision: 3
- Losses: 4
- By knockout: 1
- By submission: 2
- By decision: 1
- No contests: 1

Other information
- Mixed martial arts record from Sherdog

James Gallagher (born 24 October 1996) is an Irish professional mixed martial artist who competes in the Featherweight division of Rizin Fighting Federation. He previously competed in Bellator MMA and Professional Fighters League.

== Early life ==
Gallagher was born in Strabane, County Tyrone, Northern Ireland. He began training in martial arts at a young age and gravitated toward mixed martial arts in his early teens. Influenced by the rise of Irish MMA and Conor McGregor, he joined SBG Ireland in Dublin to pursue MMA full-time.

== Mixed martial arts career ==
=== Early career ===
Gallagher began his professional career in 2015, quickly securing a three fights of first-round submission wins on the regional promotion scene in United Kingdom and Ireland before signed with Bellator MMA.

=== Bellator MMA ===
On April 7, 2016, it was reported that Gallagher signed with Bellator MMA.

Gallagher made his promotional debut against Mike Cutting on July 16, 2016, at Bellator 158. He won the fight via unanimous decision.

Gallagher was initially scheduled to face Kirill Medvedovsky on November 10, 2016, at Bellator 164. However, the promotion announced that Gallagher was moved to Bellator 169 on December 12, 2016, to serve as the co-main event against Anthony Taylor instead. He won the fight via a rear-naked choke in round three.

The bout with Medvedovsky took place on February 24, 2017, at Bellator 173. He won the fight via a rear-naked choke in round one.

Gallagher faced Chinzo Machida on June 24, 2017, at Bellator 180. He won the fight via a rear-naked choke in round one.

Gallagher was scheduled to face Jeremiah Labiano in the main event on November 10, 2017, at Bellator 187. However, Gallagher was forced to withdraw due to a knee injury.

Gallagher was scheduled to face Ádám Borics on April 6, 2018, at Bellator 196. However, Gallagher withdrew from the bout due to suffered a hand injury.

==== Move down to bantamweight ====
Gallagher made his bantamweight debut against Ricky Bandejas on August 17, 2018, at Bellator 204. He lost the fight via knockout in the first round, suffered his first professional loss.

Gallagher faced Steven Graham on February 23, 2019, at Bellator 217. He won the fight via a rear-naked choke in round one.

He returned to the cage at Bellator 270 in November 2021 but lost via guillotine choke to Patchy Mix. Gallagher has expressed plans to continue developing his all-around game to return to title contention.

After the end of Bellator Gallagher was set to debut for Absolute Championship Akhmat on ACA 194 against Ali AlQaisi but according to AlQaisi he pulled out last minute because he didn't like the warmup area.

== Fighting style ==
Gallagher is a grappling-focused fighter with a background in Brazilian Jiu-Jitsu. The majority of his victories have come by submission, most often by rear-naked choke or guillotine choke. He fights from an orthodox stance and often pressures early to bring opponents to the ground.

== Personal life ==
Gallagher has been open about his struggles with anxiety and mental health, using his platform to speak about the pressures of professional fighting. He is known by the nickname "The Strabanimal" and remains based in Ireland.

== Mixed martial arts record ==
Professional record breakdown
17 matches	13 wins	4 losses
By knockout	0	1
By submission	10	2
By decision	3	1

Res.	Record	Opponent	Method	Event	Date	Round	Time	Location	Notes
Loss	13–4	Kazumasa Majima	Technical Submission (arm-triangle choke)	Rizin Landmark 13	April 12, 2026	3	2:34	Fukuoka, Japan	
Win	13–3	Fabrício Soares	Submission (armbar)	971 FC 2	June 14, 2025	2	4:43	Dubai, United Arab Emirates	
Loss	12–3	Leandro Higo	Decision (unanimous)	Bellator Champions Series 1	March 22, 2024	3	5:00	Belfast, Northern Ireland	
Win	12–2	James Gonzalez	Decision (split)	Bellator 298	August 11, 2023	3	5:00	Sioux Falls, South Dakota, United States	Return to Featherweight.
Loss	11–2	Patchy Mix	Submission (guillotine choke)	Bellator 270	November 5, 2021	3	0:39	Dublin, Ireland	Catchweight (137.8 lb) bout; Mix missed weight.
Win	11–1	Callum Ellenor	Submission (rear-naked choke)	Bellator Milan 3	October 3, 2020	1	4:31	Milan, Italy	
Win	10–1	Roman Salazar	Submission (guillotine choke)	Bellator 227	September 27, 2019	1	0:35	Dublin, Ireland	Catchweight (145.7 lb) bout; Salazar missed weight.
Win	9–1	Jeremiah Labiano	Decision (unanimous)	Bellator 223	June 22, 2019	3	5:00	London, England	Catchweight (140 lb) bout.
Win	8–1	Steven Graham	Submission (rear-naked choke)	Bellator 217	February 23, 2019	1	2:30	Dublin, Ireland	
Loss	7–1	Ricky Bandejas	KO (head kick and punches)	Bellator 204	August 17, 2018	1	2:49	Sioux Falls, South Dakota, United States	Bantamweight debut.
Win	7–0	Chinzo Machida	Submission (rear-naked choke)	Bellator 180	June 24, 2017	1	2:22	New York City, New York, United States	
Win	6–0	Kirill Medvedovsky	Submission (rear-naked choke)	Bellator 173	February 24, 2017	1	2:53	Belfast, Northern Ireland	
Win	5–0	Anthony Taylor	Submission (rear-naked choke)	Bellator 169	December 16, 2016	3	1:52	Dublin, Ireland	
Win	4–0	Mike Cutting	Decision (unanimous)	Bellator 158	July 16, 2016	3	5:00	London, England	Catchweight (148.3 lb) bout; Cutting missed weight.
Win	3–0	Gerard Gilmore	Submission (rear-naked choke)	BAMMA 24	February 27, 2016	1	2:55	Dublin, Ireland	
Win	2–0	Declan McAleenan	Submission (guillotine choke)	Chaos FC 15	December 5, 2015	1	N/A	Derry, Northern Ireland	
Win	1–0	Denis Ahern	Submission (rear-naked choke)	Cage Kings 3	October 17, 2015	1	N/A	Cork, Ireland	Featherweight debut.

== See also ==
- List of male mixed martial artists
