= Joe Taimanglo =

Guamanian mixed martial arts fighter

- Born: June 27, 1984 (age 42); Yona, Guam
- Other names: Baby; The Juggernaut
- Nationality: Guamanian (Overseas American)
- Height: 5 ft 4 in (1.63 m)
- Weight: 135.2 lb (61.3 kg; 9.66 st)
- Division: Bantamweight; Featherweight
- Reach: 65 in (165 cm)
- Stance: Orthodox
- Fighting out of: Yona, Guam
- Team: Spike 22
- Rank: Brown belt in Brazilian Jiu-Jitsu under Renato Verissimo
- Years active: 2004–present

Mixed martial arts record
- Total: 34
- Wins: 24
- By knockout: 5
- By submission: 12
- By decision: 7
- Losses: 9
- By knockout: 2
- By submission: 2
- By decision: 5
- Draws: 1

Other information
- Mixed martial arts record from Sherdog

Joe Taimanglo (born June 27, 1984) is a Guamanian professional mixed martial artist of Chamorro ethnicity who competes in Bellator's Bantamweight division. A professional competitor since 2004, Taimanglo has also formerly competed for Pacific Xtreme Combat and DEEP.

== Background ==
Born and raised in Yona, Guam, Taimanglo competed in football, and was talented, competing at the professional level on his Island and won Defensive Player of the Year honors in 2004.

== Mixed martial arts career ==
=== Pacific Xtreme Combat ===
Taimanglo started his professional career in 2004. He fought mainly for Guam-based promotion Pacific Xtreme Combat.

Taimanglo faced Harris Sarmiento on October 29, 2011 at PXC 27 for the vacant featherweight title. He defeated Sarmiento after five rounds and became the new PXC featherweight champion.

Taimanglo faced Jang Yong Kim on July 28, 2012 at PXC 32. He won via TKO early in the first round and retained his title.

In 2013, with a record of 17–4–1, Taimanglo signed with Bellator.

=== Bellator MMA ===
Taimanglo was scheduled to make his promotional debut against Shah Bobonis on March 28, 2013 at Bellator 94. However, Bobonis had problems in making weight and was replaced by Ronnie Rogers. Taimanglo won via submission due to a north-south choke in the second round.

Taimanglo faced Andrew Fisher on September 13, 2013 at Bellator 99 in the quarterfinal match of Bellator season nine featherweight tournament. He won via unanimous decision (29-28, 29-28, 29-28) and advanced to the semifinals.

Taimanglo then faced Justin Wilcox in the semifinals on October 11, 2013 at Bellator 103. He lost the fight via unanimous decision (30-27, 30-27, 29-28).

Taimanglo then faced Rob Emerson on April 11, 2014 at Bellator 116. He lost the fight via unanimous decision.

Taimanglo faced Michael Parker on September 26, 2014 at Bellator 126. He won the fight via unanimous decision.

Taimanglo faced Antonio Duarte at Bellator 137 on May 15, 2015. He won the fight via knockout in the third round.

In his most anticipated bout to date he faced Darrion Caldwell in an expected bantamweight title eliminator fight until Taimanglo missed weight. He went on to submit Caldwell just nine seconds into the third round with a guillotine choke.

Taimanglo and Caldwell had a rematch in the main event at Bellator 167 on December 3, 2016. This time Caldwell managed to keep Taimanglo down and avoid all of Taimanglo's submission attempts, resulting in a unanimous decision loss for Taimanglo.

Taimanglo was expected to face Steve Garcia at Bellator 174 on March 3, 2017. However, the bout was removed from the fight card after Taimanglo missed weight.

Taimanglo faced Leandro Higo at Bellator 184 on October 6, 2017. He lost the fight via unanimous decision.

Taimanglo faced Joe Warren at Bellator 195 on March 2, 2018. He won the fight via split decision.

Taimanglo retired in the August of 2018, only to return to competition against Abdul-Rakhman Dudaev at WFCA 54 on November 16, 2018. He lost the fight via unanimous decision.

== Personal life ==
On October 22, 2020, Taimanglo was stopped by a police patrol while he was driving a scooter with expired plates. Subsequently, the police found a loaded gun, drug paraphernalia and methamphetamine from Taimanglo's possession. He was arrested and charged with three third-degree felonies.

== Championships and accomplishments ==
=== Mixed martial arts ===
- MMAjunkie
  - July 2016 Submission of the Month: vs. Darrion Caldwell on July 22
- Pacific Xtreme Combat
  - PXC Featherweight Championship (One time)
  - One successful title defense

=== Grappling ===
- Pan Asian Grappling Tournament
  - No-gi Most Technical Fighter (2006–07)

== Mixed martial arts record ==
Professional record breakdown
34 matches	24 wins	9 losses
By knockout	5	2
By submission	12	2
By decision	7	5
Draws	1	

Res.	Record	Opponent	Method	Event	Date	Round	Time	Location	Notes
Loss	24–9–1	Abdul-Rakhman Dudaev	Decision (unanimous)	WCFA 54: Dudaev vs. Taimanglo	November 16, 2018	3	5:00	Isa Town, Bahrain	Catchweight (147 lbs) bout.
Win	24–8–1	Joe Warren	Decision (split)	Bellator 195	March 2, 2018	3	5:00	Thackerville, Oklahoma, United States	
Loss	23–8–1	Leandro Higo	Decision (unanimous)	Bellator 184	October 6, 2017	3	5:00	Thackerville, Oklahoma, United States	
Loss	23–7–1	Darrion Caldwell	Decision (unanimous)	Bellator 167	December 3, 2016	3	5:00	Thackerville, Oklahoma, United States	
Win	23–6–1	Darrion Caldwell	Submission (guillotine choke)	Bellator 159	July 22, 2016	3	0:09	Mulvane, Kansas, United States	Catchweight (138 lbs) bout; Taimanglo missed weight.
Win	22–6–1	Sirwan Kakai	Decision (unanimous)	Bellator 151	March 4, 2016	3	5:00	Thackerville, Oklahoma, United States	
Win	21–6–1	Antonio Duarte	KO (anchor punch)	Bellator 137	May 15, 2015	3	1:00	Temecula, California, United States	Catchweight (136 lbs) bout.
Win	20–6–1	Michael Parker	Decision (unanimous)	Bellator 126	September 26, 2014	3	5:00	Phoenix, Arizona, United States	
Loss	19–6–1	Rob Emerson	Decision (unanimous)	Bellator 116	April 11, 2014	3	5:00	Temecula, California, United States	Bantamweight debut.
Loss	19–5–1	Justin Wilcox	Decision (unanimous)	Bellator 103	October 11, 2013	3	5:00	Mulvane, Kansas, United States	Bellator Season Nine Featherweight Tournament Semifinal.
Win	19–4–1	Andrew Fisher	Decision (unanimous)	Bellator 99	September 13, 2013	3	5:00	Temecula, California, United States	Bellator Season Nine Featherweight Tournament Quarterfinal.
Win	18–4–1	Ronnie Rogers	Submission (north-south choke)	Bellator 94	March 28, 2013	2	0:33	Tampa, Florida, United States	
Win	17–4–1	Jang Yong Kim	TKO (punches)	PXC: Pacific Xtreme Combat 32	July 28, 2012	1	0:40	Mangilao, Guam, United States	Defended PXC Featherweight Championship.
Win	16–4–1	Harris Sarmiento	Decision (unanimous)	PXC: Pacific Xtreme Combat 27	October 29, 2011	5	5:00	Mangilao, Guam, United States	Won PXC Featherweight Championship.
Win	15–4–1	Young Jun Kim	Submission (rear-naked choke)	PXC: Pacific Xtreme Combat 24	June 11, 2011	1	1:23	Manila, Metro Manila, Philippines	
Win	14–4–1	Travis Beyer	Submission (kneebar)	PXC: Pacific Xtreme Combat 22	January 21, 2011	2	0:28	Mangilao, Guam, United States	
Win	13–4–1	Yong Nam Gu	Submission (arm-triangle choke)	PXC: Pacific Xtreme Combat 20	July 24, 2010	1	1:30	Mangilao, Guam, United States	
Win	12–4–1	Chan Ho Bae	Submission (arm-triangle choke)	PXC 19: Nineteen	May 1, 2010	3	N/A	Mangilao, Guam, United States	
Win	11–4–1	Per Eklund	Submission (D'Arce choke)	PRO Fighting 3: Destiny vs. Demons	February 7, 2010	1	1:36	Taipei, Taiwan	
Win	10–4–1	Alex Castro	Decision (unanimous)	PXC 18: Dead Game 2	September 19, 2009	3	5:00	Mangilao, Guam, United States	
Loss	9–4–1	Toshiaki Kitada	Submission (guillotine choke)	Deep: 41 Impact	April 16, 2009	1	1:29	Tokyo, Japan	
Loss	9–3–1	Tomonori Taniguchi	Submission (guillotine choke)	PXC 16: The Beatdown	November 21, 2008	2	N/A	Mangilao, Guam, United States	
Win	9–2–1	Alex Castro	Submission (rear-naked choke)	PXC 15: Dead Game	July 25, 2008	3	N/A	Mangilao, Guam, United States	
Win	8–2–1	Colin MacKenzie	TKO (punches)	PXC 14: Evolution	March 10, 2008	1	N/A	Mangilao, Guam, United States	
Win	7–2–1	Derrick Rangamar	Submission (rear-naked choke)	PXC 13: Back from the Dead	November 17, 2007	2	N/A	Mangilao, Guam, United States	
Loss	6–2–1	Maurice Eazel	KO (punches)	PXC 11: No Turning Back	April 13, 2007	1	N/A	Mangilao, Guam, United States	
Draw	6–1–1	Jimmy Jarquin	Draw	PXC 10: Final Redemption	January 27, 2007	3	5:00	Mangilao, Guam, United States	
Win	6–1	Sourikone Nhinsavath	Decision (unanimous)	PXC 9: Grand Prix	October 13, 2006	3	5:00	Mangilao, Guam, United States	
Win	5–1	Albert Manners	Submission (rear-naked choke)	PXC 8: Terror Dome	July 28, 2006	1	N/A	Mangilao, Guam, United States	
Win	4–1	Chico Cantiberos	Submission (triangle choke)	PXC 7: Eruption	April 28, 2006	1	N/A	Mangilao, Guam, United States	
Win	3–1	Matt Manibusan	Submission (choke)	PXC 6: Tempun Gura	January 13, 2006	1	N/A	Mangilao, Guam, United States	
Win	2–1	Ray Quidachay	TKO (punches)	PXC 4: Gera	January 14, 2005	1	1:31	Mangilao, Guam, United States	
Loss	1–1	Justin Guzman	TKO (punches)	PXC 3: Return of the Enforcer	August 28, 2004	2	4:49	Mangilao, Guam, United States	
Win	1–0	T.B. Hardison	TKO (punches)	FFCF Islands: Tinian	April 30, 2004	3	N/A	Tinian, Northern Mariana Islands, United States	
