= Masakatsu Ueda =

Japanese mixed martial arts (MMA) fighter

- Born: December 21, 1977 (age 48); Minami-ku, Kyoto, Japan
- Nationality: Japanese
- Height: 5 ft 8 in (1.73 m)
- Weight: 135 lb (61 kg; 9.6 st)
- Division: Bantamweight
- Style: Wrestling, Brazilian Jiu-Jitsu
- Team: Paraestra Tokyo, Team Haleo
- Trainer: Yuki Nakai

Mixed martial arts record
- Total: 34
- Wins: 26
- By knockout: 2
- By submission: 6
- By decision: 18
- Losses: 6
- By submission: 2
- By decision: 4
- Draws: 2

Other information
- Mixed martial arts record from Sherdog

Masakatsu Ueda (born December 21, 1977) is a professional Japanese mixed martial artist who currently competes in the bantamweight division of Pancrase.

Ueda was also a college level wrestler in Japan, where holds a win over fellow mixed martial artist and Japanese superstar Norifumi Yamamoto, better known as "Kid" Yamamoto. Ueda has also won many national titles in combat wrestling. He also won the All Japan Shooto Grappling championship, and both A and B class Shooto Rookie Tournaments. He is a blue belt in Brazilian Jiu-Jitsu under Yuki Nakai.

== Mixed martial arts career ==
=== Shooto ===
Ueda won the vacant Shooto Featherweight Championship after defeating Koetsu Okazai on March 28, 2008, by Unanimous Decision at Shooto's Back To Our Roots 8 show.

=== Bellator ===
Ueda faced Travis Marx in the first round of the Season 6 Bantamweight Tournament and suffered a unanimous decision loss in a competitive fight. He was later released from the promotion.

=== ONE Fighting Championship ===
Following his release from Bellator, Ueda signed with ONE Championship and entered the ONE FC Bantamweight Grand Prix. He made his debut against Min Jung Song at ONE Fighting Championship: Rise of Kings on October 6.

Ueda faced Jens Pulver in the Bantamweight Grand Prix semifinals on April 5, 2013, at ONE Fighting Championship: Kings and Champions. He won the fight by submission.

On May 31, 2013, he faced Kevin Belingon at ONE Fighting Championship: Rise to Power in the ONE Bantamweight Grand Prix Final. Ueda won the fight by unanimous decision.

By winning the Bantamweight Grand Prix, Ueda was able to secure a title shot against Bibiano Fernandes for the ONE Bantamweight Championship. He faced Fernandes at ONE Fighting Championship: Rise of Heroes on May 2, 2014. He lost by unanimous decision.

== Championships and accomplishments ==
- Shooto
  - Shooto Featherweight Championship (1 time)
  - Three successful title defenses
- ONE Fighting Championship
  - ONE FC Bantamweight 2013 Grand Prix Champion

== Mixed martial arts record ==
Professional record breakdown
34 matches	26 wins	6 losses
By knockout	2	0
By submission	6	2
By decision	18	4
Draws	2	

Res.	Record	Opponent	Method	Event	Date	Round	Time	Location	Notes
Loss	26–6–2	Rafael Silva	Decision (unanimous)	Pancrase 296	May 20, 2018	5	5:00	Tokyo, Japan	For Pancrase Interim Bantamweight Championship
Win	26–5–2	Alan Yoshihiro Yamaniha	Submission (keylock)	Pancrase 291	November 12, 2017	3	4:52	Tokyo, Japan	
Win	25–5–2	Toshinori Tsunemura	Decision (unanimous)	Pancrase 288	July 2, 2017	3	5:00	Tokyo, Japan	
Win	24–5–2	Victor Henry	Decision (unanimous)	Pancrase 285	March 12, 2017	3	5:00	Tokyo, Japan	
Win	23–5–2	Hidekazu Fukushima	Decision (unanimous)	Pancrase 282	November 13, 2016	3	5:00	Tokyo, Japan	
Loss	22–5–2	Rafael Silva	Decision (unanimous)	Pancrase 279	July 24, 2016	3	5:00	Tokyo, Japan	
Win	22–4–2	Jun Doi	Decision (unanimous)	Grandslam 4: Way of the Cage	March 19, 2016	3	3:00	Tokyo, Japan	
Win	21–4–2	Jose Alday	Technical Submission (rear naked choke)	Pancrase - 275	January 31, 2016	3	2:02	Tokyo, Japan	
Win	20–4–2	Kosuke Terashima	Decision (unanimous)	Pancrase - 271	November 1, 2015	3	3:00	Tokyo, Japan	
Win	19–4–2	Luis Nogueira	Decision (unanimous)	Pancrase - 268	July 5, 2015	3	5:00	Tokyo, Japan	
Loss	18–4–2	Victor Henry	Submission (kneebar)	Grandslam MMA 2: Way of the Cage	February 8, 2015	3	3:22	Tokyo, Japan	
Loss	18–3–2	Bibiano Fernandes	Decision (unanimous)	ONE FC: Rise of Heroes	May 2, 2014	5	5:00	Pasay, Philippines	For the ONE FC Bantamweight Championship
Win	18–2–2	Kevin Belingon	Decision (unanimous)	ONE FC: Rise to Power	May 31, 2013	3	5:00	Pasay, Philippines	Won the ONE FC Bantamweight Grand Prix.
Win	17–2–2	Jens Pulver	Submission (D'arce choke)	ONE FC: Kings and Champions	April 5, 2013	2	3:52	Kallang, Singapore	ONE FC Bantamweight Grand Prix semifinal
Win	16–2–2	Min Jung Song	Decision (unanimous)	ONE FC: Rise of Kings	Oct 6, 2012	3	5:00	Kallang, Singapore	ONE FC Bantamweight Grand Prix first round
Loss	15–2–2	Travis Marx	Decision (unanimous)	Bellator 64	April 6, 2012	3	5:00	Windsor, Ontario, Canada	Bellator Season 6 Bantamweight Tournament Quarterfinal
Win	15–1–2	Kyoji Horiguchi	Decision (majority)	Shooto: Survivor Tournament Final	January 8, 2012	3	5:00	Tokyo, Japan	Return to Bantamweight
Win	14–1–2	Royler Gracie	Decision (split)	Amazon Forest Combat 1	September 14, 2011	3	5:00	Manaus, Brazil	Lightweight bout
Win	13–1–2	Rumina Sato	KO (kick to the body)	Shooto: Shooting Disco 15: Try Hard, Japan!	July 11, 2011	1	4:23	Tokyo, Japan	
Win	12–1–2	Ralph Acosta	Submission (D'arce choke)	Shooto: Shootor's Legacy 1	January 10, 2011	2	1:13	Tokyo, Japan	
Win	11–1–2	Akitoshi Tamura	Decision (unanimous)	Shooto: The Way of Shooto 3: Like a Tiger, Like a Dragon	May 30, 2010	3	5:00	Tokyo, Japan	
Loss	10–1–2	Shuichiro Katsumura	Submission (ninja choke)	Shooto: The Way of Shooto 2: Like a Tiger, Like a Dragon	March 22, 2010	2	3:39	Tokyo, Japan	Lost Shooto Featherweight (132 lbs.) Championship
Win	10–0–2	Eduardo Dantas	Decision (unanimous)	Shooto: Revolutionary Exchanges 1: Undefeated	July 19, 2009	3	5:00	Tokyo, Japan	Defended Shooto Featherweight (132 lbs.) Championship
Win	9–0–2	So Tazawa	Decision (unanimous)	Shooto: Tradition 6	March 29, 2009	3	5:00	Tokyo, Japan	Defended Shooto Featherweight (132 lbs.) Championship
Draw	8–0–2	Marcos Galvão	Draw (split)	Shooto: Shooto Tradition 3	September 28, 2008	3	5:00	Tokyo, Japan	Defended Shooto Featherweight (132 lbs.) Championship
Win	8–0–1	Koetsu Okazaki	Decision (unanimous)	Shooto: Back To Our Roots 8	March 28, 2008	3	5:00	Tokyo, Japan	For the vacant Shooto Featherweight (132 lbs.) Championship
Win	7–0–1	Atsushi Yamamoto	Decision (unanimous)	Shooto: Back To Our Roots 7	January 26, 2008	3	5:00	Tokyo, Japan	
Win	6–0–1	Tetsu Suzuki	Decision (unanimous)	Shooto: Rookie Tournament 2007 Final	December 8, 2007	3	5:00	Tokyo, Japan	
Draw	5–0–1	Takeya Mizugaki	Draw (majority)	Shooto: Back To Our Roots 4	July 15, 2007	3	5:00	Tokyo, Japan	
Win	5–0	So Tazawa	Submission (D'arce choke)	Shooto: Back To Our Roots 2	March 16, 2007	3	2:00	Tokyo, Japan	
Win	4–0	Teriyuki Matsumoto	Submission (triangle choke)	Shooto: Rookie Tournament Final	December 2, 2006	1	4:42	Tokyo, Japan	
Win	3–0	Naoki Yahagi	TKO (punches)	Shooto 2006: 10/1 in Kitazawa Town Hall	October 1, 2006	1	3:49	Tokyo, Japan	
Win	2–0	Nobuhiro Hayakawa	Decision (unanimous)	Shooto: Gig West 5	June 3, 2006	2	5:00	Osaka, Japan	
Win	1–0	Satoshi Yamashita	Decision (unanimous)	Shooto 2005: 11/29 in Kitazawa Town Hall	November 29, 2005	2	5:00	Tokyo, Japan	
