= Rafael Silva (fighter) =

Brazilian martial artist (born 1985)

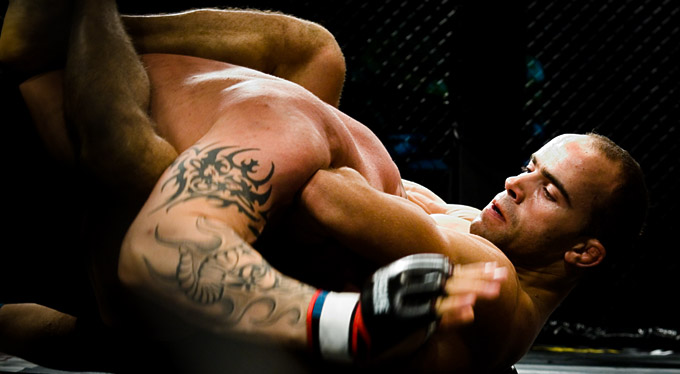
- Silva locking a guillotine choke on Mika Ilmén in 2005
- Born: March 20, 1985 (age 41); Lages, Santa Catarina, Brazil
- Other names: Morcego; The Machine
- Height: 5 ft 7 in (1.70 m)
- Weight: 135 lb (61 kg; 9 st 9 lb)
- Division: Bantamweight
- Reach: 65 in (165 cm)
- Fighting out of: Lages, Santa Catarina, Brazil
- Team: Renovação Fight Team (formerly); Astra Fight Team
- Rank: 1st degree black belt in Brazilian jiu-jitsu under Weber Ecamila
- Years active: 2005–2022

Mixed martial arts record
- Total: 39
- Wins: 31
- By knockout: 8
- By submission: 15
- By decision: 8
- Losses: 8
- By knockout: 3
- By submission: 1
- By decision: 4

Other information
- Mixed martial arts record from Sherdog

Rafael Silva (Brazilian Portuguese: [ʁafaˈɛw ˈsiwvɐ]; born March 20, 1985) is a retired Brazilian professional mixed martial artist who competed in the Bantamweight division. A professional competitor since 2005, Silva has competed in his native Brazil for most of his career, but has also multiple bouts in Pancrase, where he was the Bantamweight King of Pancrase, and Bellator MMA.

== Background ==
Silva started training martial arts at the age of 15. His brother Julio Cesar Neves is also a professional mixed martial artist.

== Mixed martial arts career ==
=== Early career ===
Silva made his professional MMA debut in June 2005. After going 2–2 in his first four fights, he maintained an impressive record of 18 wins and only 1 loss from 2009 to 2012. Among his notable wins was a victory over former UFC fighter John Lineker.

A long-time veteran of the national Brazilian MMA scene, Silva fought for a variety of promotions - including World Fighting Combat, Sparta MMA, Octagon MMA, Connect Fight Night, Energy Force, and Nitrix Champion Fight - before making his North American debut.

=== Bellator MMA ===
In June 2012, it was announced that Silva had signed with Bellator MMA, although he did not debut until a year later.

Silva entered as a participant in the 2013 Summer Series Bantamweight tournament. He faced Rodrigo Lima in the semifinals at Bellator 97 and won via submission in the third round. The finals were delayed until the fall of 2013 and he eventually faced Anthony Leone at Bellator 102. He won the fight via dominant unanimous decision to earn a title shot.

Silva was booked to face Bantamweight Champion Eduardo Dantas on March 7, 2014, but due to a knee injury, Silva was replaced by Anthony Leone at Bellator 111.

Silva stepped in to replace Eduardo Dantas to face Joe Warren at Bellator 118 on May 2, 2014. The fight was scheduled for the Bellator Interim Bantamweight championship. Silva, however, missed weight and the promotion made the interim title available only if Warren were to win. Silva lost the fight via unanimous decision.

Silva faced Rob Emerson on October 3, 2014 at Bellator 127. He won the fight by unanimous decision.

Silva faced Darrion Caldwell at Bellator 137 on May 15, 2015. He lost the fight by unanimous decision.

In June 2015, it was revealed that Silva, along with his brother Julio Cesar and 6 other fighters, were released from the promotion.

=== Post-Bellator career ===
Silva returned to the Brazilian circuit and faced Derinaldo Guerra for the vacant Aspera FC Bantamweight title on September 12, 2015, winning the fight by arm-triangle choke in the first round.

After two submission wins in smaller independent organizations, Silva signed with Pancrase.

=== Pancrase ===
In his promotional debut Silva faced Shohei Masumizu at Pancrase 276 on March 13, 2016, winning the bout via submission in the first round.

Next he faced Masakatsu Ueda at Pancrase 279 on July 24, 2016. Silva won the bout via unanimous decision.

In his third Pancrase bout Silva faced Victor Henry at Pancrase 282 on November 13, 2016. He won the fight via split decision.

Three straight victories in the promotion aligned Silva to challenge the prevailing Bantamweight King of Pancrase Shintaro Ishiwatari at Pancrase 287 on May 28, 2017. He lost the title fight via unanimous decision.

Later that year, Ishiwatari's title was vacated as he left Pancrase to enter Rizin Bantamweight Grand Prix, leading Silva to rematch Masakatsu Ueda for the interim Bantamweight Championship. The fight eventually happened at Pancrase 296 on May 20, 2018, Silva becoming the interim Bantamweight King of Pancrase via unanimous decision. He was subsequently promoted to undisputed Bantamweight King of Pancrase.

In the first title defense, Silva faced Kenta Takizawa at Pancrase 303 on March 17, 2019. Silva successfully defended the title, winning the fight via submission in the first round.

As the second title defense, Silva faced Yuto Hokamura at Pancrase 307 on July 21, 2019. Silva defended his title again via second round submission win.

=== ONE Championship ===
In October 2019, Silva's manager revealed that Silva is no longer under contract with Pancrase, and had signed a one-bout contract with ONE Championship. In his promotional debut, Silva faced Shoko Sato at ONE Championship: Century Part 2 on October 13, 2019. Silva lost the round via technical knockout in the second round.

Silva was then scheduled to face Gabriel Miranda at Brave CF 35 on March 28, 2020. However, the bout was scrapped after the event was postponed to another date due to the COVID-19 pandemic.

Silva was scheduled to have a unification match with Taichi Nakajima at Pancrase 327 in April, 2022, however he suffered a knee injury and retired from MMA.

== Championships and accomplishments ==
- Bellator MMA
  - Bellator 2013 Summer Series Bantamweight Tournament Winner
- Pancrase
  - Pancrase Interim Bantamweight Championship (one time; former)
  - Pancrase Bantamweight Championship (one time; former)
    - Two successful title defenses
- Aspera Fighting Championship
  - AFC Bantamweight Championship (one time; former)

== Mixed martial arts record ==
Professional record breakdown
39 matches	31 wins	8 losses
By knockout	8	3
By submission	15	1
By decision	8	4

Res.	Record	Opponent	Method	Event	Date	Round	Time	Location	Notes
Loss	31–8	Vicente Vargas	TKO (punches)	UAE Warriors 48	March 3, 2024	3	2:14	Balneário Camboriú, Brazil	
Loss	31–7	Shoko Sato	TKO (punches)	ONE: Century – Part 2	October 13, 2019	2	4:30	Tokyo, Japan	
Win	31–6	Yuto Hokamura	Submission (arm-triangle choke)	Pancrase 307	July 21, 2019	2	1:54	Tokyo, Japan	Defended the Pancrase Bantamweight Championship.
Win	30–6	Kenta Takizawa	Submission (rear-naked choke)	Pancrase 303	March 17, 2019	1	3:12	Tokyo, Japan	Defended the Pancrase Bantamweight Championship.
Win	29–6	Masakatsu Ueda	Decision (unanimous)	Pancrase 296	May 20, 2018	5	5:00	Tokyo, Japan	Won the interim Pancrase Bantamweight Championship. Later promoted to undisputed champion.
Loss	28–6	Shintaro Ishiwatari	Decision (unanimous)	Pancrase 287	May 28, 2017	5	5:00	Tokyo, Japan	For the Pancrase Bantamweight Championship.
Win	28–5	Victor Henry	Decision (split)	Pancrase 282	November 13, 2016	3	5:00	Tokyo, Japan	
Win	27–5	Masakatsu Ueda	Decision (unanimous)	Pancrase 279	July 24, 2016	3	5:00	Tokyo, Japan	
Win	26–5	Shohei Masumizu	Submission (arm-triangle choke)	Pancrase 276	March 13, 2016	1	2:58	Tokyo, Japan	
Win	25–5	Ruben Hernandez Parra	Submission (arm-triangle choke)	The Best Fighter 1	January 9, 2016	1	1:47	Praia, Cape Verde	
Win	24–5	Jeferson Vieira da Silva	Submission (armbar)	XFC International 13	December 5, 2015	2	1:25	São Paulo, Brazil	
Win	23–5	Derinaldo Guerra	Submission (arm-triangle choke)	Aspera FC 24	September 12, 2015	1	4:03	São José, Brazil	Won the vacant AFC Bantamweight Championship.
Loss	22–5	Darrion Caldwell	Decision (unanimous)	Bellator 137	May 15, 2015	3	5:00	Temecula, California, United States	
Win	22–4	Rob Emerson	Decision (unanimous)	Bellator 127	October 3, 2014	3	5:00	Temecula, California, United States	
Loss	21–4	Joe Warren	Decision (unanimous)	Bellator 118	May 2, 2014	5	5:00	Atlantic City, New Jersey, United States	For the interim Bellator Bantamweight World Championship.
Win	21–3	Anthony Leone	Decision (unanimous)	Bellator 102	October 4, 2013	3	5:00	Visalia, California, United States	Won the Bellator 2013 Summer Series Bantamweight Tournament.
Win	20–3	Rodrigo Lima	Submission (rear-naked choke)	Bellator 97	July 31, 2013	3	2:03	Rio Rancho, New Mexico, United States	Bellator 2013 Summer Series Bantamweight Tournament Semifinal.
Win	19–3	Fabio Selim	Submission (rear-naked choke)	Sparta MMA	September 29, 2012	3	3:01	Itajaí, Brazil	
Win	18–3	Luciano Aranha	TKO (punches)	Connect Fight Night 2	July 17, 2012	1	1:56	Biguacu, Brazil	
Win	17–3	Mauricio da Silva	KO (head kick)	Energy Force	May 19, 2012	1	0:07	Navegantes, Brazil	
Win	16–3	Saulo Silva	KO (Superman punch)	Connect Fight Night 1	March 31, 2012	1	1:15	Balneario Camboriu, Brazil	
Win	15–3	Diego D'Avila	TKO (punches)	Nitrix Champion Fight 10	February 11, 2012	1	3:52	Camboriú, Brazil	
Win	14–3	Wagner Noronha	Decision (split)	Apocalypse Fighting Championship	October 8, 2011	3	5:00	Passo Fundo, Brazil	
Win	13–3	Fernando Giacometti	TKO (elbows)	Octagon MMA	October 1, 2011	1	1:04	Itajaí, Brazil	
Win	12–3	Tiago Silva	KO (punch)	Octagon MMA	October 1, 2011	1	0:52	Itajaí, Brazil	
Win	11–3	Jonatan Feitosa	Submission (rear-naked choke)	Centurion Mixed Martial Arts 2	July 9, 2011	3	2:42	Itajaí, Brazil	
Win	10–3	Ozeias Costa	Decision (unanimous)	Full Heroes Battle 4	June 25, 2011	3	5:00	Paranagua, Brazil	
Win	9–3	Rogerio Goncalves Menna	Submission (arm-triangle choke)	World Fighting Combat: Pretorian	June 11, 2011	1	2:46	Pelotas, Brazil	
Loss	8–3	Diego D'Avila	Submission (armbar)	Nitrix Champion Fight 6	February 19, 2011	1	4:33	Brusque, Brazil	
Win	8–2	Erikson Lima	Submission (rear-naked choke)	Centurion Mixed Martial Arts	January 15, 2011	1	1:38	Balneario Camboriu, Brazil	
Win	7–2	Fabio Nunes	Submission (kimura)	Colizeu Fight Championship	November 20, 2010	1	1:02	Joaçaba, Brazil	
Win	6–2	Edson da Silva	Submission (triangle choke)	Black Trunk Fight 1	August 14, 2010	1	N/A	Florianópolis, Brazil	
Win	5–2	Joilson Costelinha	Submission (armbar)	Nitrix Champion Fight 5	May 15, 2010	1	4:53	Balneario Camboriu, Brazil	
Win	4–2	David Bad Boy	Submission (rear-naked choke)	Nitrix Show Fight 4	February 6, 2010	1	4:40	Balneario Camboriu, Brazil	
Win	3–2	John Lineker	Decision (unanimous)	Warrior's Challenge 4	December 30, 2009	3	5:00	Porto Belo, Brazil	
Win	2–2	Wagner Mexicano	TKO (retirement)	Nitrix Show Fight 3	November 14, 2009	2	N/A	Itajaí, Brazil	
Loss	1–2	Alessandro Cordeiro	TKO (punches)	Nitrix Show Fight 2	May 16, 2009	2	N/A	Joinville, Brazil	
Loss	1–1	Marcio Furlin	Decision (split)	Floripa Fight 2	April 29, 2006	3	5:00	Florianópolis, Brazil	
Win	1–0	Wallid Wallid	TKO (punches)	X-treme Combat	June 5, 2005	1	2:36	Brazil	
