= Chike Lindsay =

American kickboxer

- Born: Chike George Lindsay-Ajudua; November 17, 1983 (age 42); Atlanta, Georgia
- Other names: Vicious Croc
- Nationality: American
- Height: 1.80 m (5 ft 11 in)
- Weight: 70 kg (150 lb; 11 st)
- Division: Welterweight; Middleweight
- Reach: 75 in (190 cm)
- Style: Kickboxing, Muay Thai, Brazilian Jiu-Jitsu, Judo, Wushu
- Fighting out of: Atlanta, Georgia
- Team: Team Vicious Croc
- Years active: 2003-present

Kickboxing record
- Total: 24
- Wins: 18
- By knockout: 6
- Losses: 6
- By knockout: 1

Mixed martial arts record
- Total: 2
- Wins: 1
- By knockout: 1
- Losses: 1
- By submission: 1

Other information
- Website: chikelindsay.com
- Last updated on: October 23, 2013

Chike George Lindsay-Ajudua (born November 17, 1983) is an American Muay Thai kickboxer who competes in the Middleweight division. Lindsay is the former WKA North American Champion, WBC Muaythai International Champion, and IMTO Super Welterweight Champion.

== Background ==
Lindsay began practicing martial arts at the age of 12, training in wushu as well as Brazilian jiu-jitsu and judo before settling on Muay Thai in 2003.

== Career ==
Within five months, Lindsay won the USMTA Southeastern amateur welterweight title and he added the ISKA and WKA North American Championships as well as the Eastern US title to his mantelpiece over the next three years.

Lindsay turned professional in 2007, preferring to focus on the fighting hotbeds of Las Vegas and California due to the high level of competition. In his first title fight as a pro, he defeated Mukai Maromo by way of majority decision in Richmond, Virginia, on September 29, 2007, to claim the WKA North American Super Welterweight (-70 kg/154.3 lb) Muay Thai strap. This win set him up for a fight against Matee "Dragon Leg" Jedeepatik, a star at Lumpinee Stadium during Muay Thai's golden age in the 1990s, for the International Muay Thai Organization World Super Welterweight Championship in Fresno, California, on November 10, 2007. He dropped Matee twice with left hooks in the fifth round to secure the decision and take the world title.

On September 4, 2008, Lindsay stopped sanshou stylist Kang En with a body shot in round five in San Bernardino, California.

He suffered his first defeat to Baxter Humby by split decision in Las Vegas, Nevada on July 25, 2009. After rebounding with a majority decision victory over Chaz Mulkey a month later, Lindsay was given the chance to challenge Kevin Ross for his WBC Muaythai United States Welterweight (-66.678 kg/147 lb) strap in Primm, Nevada, on December 5, 2009. He floored Ross in the final round but it was ruled a slip and he lost by split decision.

In 2010, Lindsay turned his hand to mixed martial arts. After taking a quick technical knockout win over Adam Brady in his MMA debut in Duluth, Georgia, on May 15, 2010, he lost by submission due to an omoplata a minute into his sophomore fight with Joe Elmore in his native Atlanta, Georgia, on December 4, 2010.

He was scheduled to make his return to Muay Thai at Bangkok Fight Night 10 in Atlanta on June 10, 2011, against Kenny Finister. However, Finister withdrew after sustaining a leg injury in training and the fight was scrapped. He instead made his comeback in a WBC Muaythai International Super Welterweight (-69.853 kg/154 lb) Championship match against Malaipet Sasiprapa at the M1 Grand Muay Thai Championship in Los Angeles, California, on August 13, 2011. It was a close fight, but it was Lindsay's knees from the clinch that made the difference as he took the split decision.

In his first international fight, Lindsey was knocked down before being stopped with an uppercut from Wang Wei Hao in round two in Changsha, China on January 1, 2012. Returning to Atlanta, he was set to face Michael Corley at Bangkok Fight Night 12 on February 17, 2012. Corley pulled out due to other commitments, however, and was replaced by Eddie Martinez. Lindsay knocked Martinez out with an elbow in the second round to take the Bangkok Fight Club promotion's super welterweight belt. Fighting in Thailand for the first time, Lindsay lost on points against Suriya Prasathinphimai at an event marking Suk Wan Muaythai Naikhanomtom (National Muaythai Day) at CentralWorld in Bangkok on March 16, 2012.

A rematch between Chike Lindsay and Malaipet took place at Bangkok Fight Night: Undisputed in Atlanta on June 15, 2012, and Lindsay came out the victor once again by unanimous decision. With this win, he moved him up to the #1 spot in the North American super welterweight rankings. He then ended the year with two more unanimous decision wins over Cyrus Washington at Take-On Productions: Muay Thai at the Mecca 2 in New York City, New York, on November 10 and Christophe Pruvost at Muay Thai in America: In Honor of the King in Los Angeles on December 1.

He took the biggest scalp of his career when he defeated Thai great Somrak Khamsing via unanimous decision in a three round bout at Push Kick Promotions: World Stand Off in Pomona, California, on March 2, 2013. He then KO'd James Martinez with knees in round one at Bangkok Fight Night: Shockwave in Atlanta on April 5, 2013.

A fight with another of Thailand's best in Saiyok Pumpanmuang was scheduled for Muaythai Superfight in Bangkok on May 16, 2013 but was cancelled after the event was pushed back to June 14.

He fought Yodsanklai Fairtex for the inaugural Lion Fight Middleweight Championship at Lion Fight 10 in Las Vegas on July 26, 2013, losing a unanimous decision. Although Lindsay started well, he was unable to keep up when Yodsanklai switched tactics to stay closer (within clinch and elbow range) and suffered three cuts later in the bout.

He lost to Samy Sana on points in the quarter-finals of the 2013 edition of Thai Fight's -70 kg/154 lb tournament in Thailand on October 23, 2013.

== Personal life ==
Chike Lindsay's on and off girlfriend and fellow kickboxer Adrienne Simmons died following a bout with Lindsay Scheer in Orlando, Florida in July 2010. She was knocked out in the third round of the fight, fell into a coma and died the following day. He has blamed Steve Fossum and the other organizers of the 2010 IKF World Classic event for not taking necessary safety precautions, stating that there was not an ambulance present at the event and that it took an hour to transport Simmons to a local hospital.

== Championships and awards ==
- Bangkok Fight Club
  - BFC Super Welterweight Championship
- International Muay Thai Organization
  - IMTO World Super Welterweight Championship
- International Sport Karate Association
  - ISKA Amateur North American Welterweight (-66.8 kg/147.3 lb) Muay Thai Championship
- United States Muay Thai Association
  - USMTA Amateur Southeastern Welterweight Championship
- World Boxing Council Muaythai
  - WBC Muaythai International Super Welterweight (-69.853 kg/154 lb) Championship
- World Kickboxing Association
  - WKA Amateur Eastern Welterweight (-67 kg/147.7 lb) Muay Thai Championship
  - WKA Amateur North American Welterweight (-67 kg/147.7 lb) Muay Thai Championship
  - WKA North American Super Welterweight (-70 kg/154.3 lb) Muay Thai Championship

== Muay Thai record ==
Professional kickboxing record
Date	Result	Opponent	Event	Location	Method	Round	Time	Record
2013-10-23	Loss	Samy Sana	2013 Thai Fight -70 kg/154 lb Tournament, Quarter Finals	Thailand	Decision	3	3:00	18-6
2013-07-26	Loss	Yodsanklai Fairtex	Lion Fight 10	Las Vegas	Decision (unanimous)	5	3:00	18-5
For the Lion Fight Middleweight Championship.
2013-04-05	Win	James Martinez	Bangkok Fight Night: Shockwave	Atlanta	KO (knees)	1	2:19	18-4
2013-03-02	Win	Somrak Khamsing	Push Kick Promotions: World Stand Off	Pomona, California	Decision (unanimous)	3	3:00	17-4
2012-12-01	Win	Christophe Pruvost	Muay Thai in America: In Honor of the King	Los Angeles	Decision (unanimous)	5	3:00	16-4
2012-11-10	Win	Cyrus Washington	Take-On Productions: Muay Thai at the Mecca 2	New York City	Decision (unanimous)	5	3:00	15-4
2012-06-15	Win	Malaipet Sasiprapa	Bangkok Fight Night: Undisputed	Atlanta	Decision (unanimous)	5	3:00	14-4
2012-03-16	Loss	Suriya Prasathinphimai	Suk Wan Muaythai Naikhanomtom	Bangkok	Decision	5	3:00	13-4
2012-02-17	Win	Eddie Martinez	Bangkok Fight Night 12	Atlanta	KO (right elbow)	2		13-3
Wins the Bangkok Fight Club Super Welterweight Championship.
2012-01-01	Loss	Wang Wei Hao	WCK Muay Thai	Changsha, China	KO (right uppercut)	2	2:38	12-3
2011-08-13	Win	Malaipet Sasiprapa	M1 Grand Muay Thai Championship	Los Angeles	Decision (split)	5	3:00	12-2
Wins the WBC Muaythai International Super Welterweight (-69.853 kg/154 lb) Championship.
2009-12-05	Loss	Kevin Ross	WCK Muay Thai	Primm, Nevada	Decision (unanimous)	5	3:00	11-2
For the WBC Muaythai United States Welterweight (-66.678 kg/147 lb) Championship.
2009-08-30	Win	Chaz Mulkey	WCK Muay Thai	Las Vegas	Decision (majority)	5	3:00	11-1
2009-07-25	Loss	Baxter Humby	WCK Muay Thai	Las Vegas	Decision (split)	5	3:00	10-1
2008-09-04	Win	Kang En	WCK Muay Thai	San Bernardino, California	KO (right cross to the body)	5	2:30	
2008-07-26	Win	Bryce Kraus	WCK Muay Thai	Las Vegas, Nevada, US	KO (knees)	2	2:59	
2007-11-10	Win	Mathee Jadeepitak	Warrior's Challenge	Fresno	Decision	5	3:00	
Wins the IMTO World Super Welterweight Championship.
2007-09-29	Win	Mukai Maromo	Combat Sports Challenge 22: The Reckoning	Richmond, Virginia	Decision (majority)	5	3:00	
Wins the WKA North American Super Welterweight (-70 kg/154.3 lb) Muay Thai Championship.

Amateur kickboxing record
Date	Result	Opponent	Event	Location	Method	Round	Time
2006-09-30	Win	Angelo Wilkes	Combat Sports Challenge 17: River City Rumble	Mechanicsville, Virginia	TKO (right body kick)	4	0:37
Wins the WKA Amateur North American Welterweight (-67 kg/147.7 lb) Muay Thai Championship.

Legend: Win Loss Draw/No contest Notes

== Mixed martial arts record ==
Mixed martial arts record
Date	Result	Opponent	Event	Location	Method	Round	Time	Record
2010-12-04	Loss	Joe Elmore	Bangkok Fight Night 8: Best of the Best	Atlanta	Submission (omoplata)	1	1:00	1-1
2010-05-15	Win	Adam Brady	Bangkok Fight Night 6	Duluth, Georgia	TKO (punches)	1	0:31	1-0

Legend: Win Loss Draw/No contest Notes
