= 2018 in Bellator MMA =

Mixed martial arts events

Information
- Promotion: Bellator MMA
- First date aired: January 20, 2018
- Last date aired: December 15, 2018

2018 in Bellator MMA was the tenth year in the history of Bellator MMA, a mixed martial arts promotion based in the United States. Bellator held 23 events in 2018.

== Background ==
In addition to airing cards on the newly-rebranded Paramount Network (formally Spike), Bellator would sign a multi-year deal with streaming service DAZN. Their partnership began with Bellator 206, which was broadcast exclusively on DAZN. Bellator would hold its 200th numbered event on May 25, 2018.

== Bellator Heavyweight World Grand Prix Tournament ==
In 2018, Bellator organised the 2018–2019 Heavyweight Grand Prix that will crown the Bellator Heavyweight champion. This belt was vacated in May 2016 by Vitaly Minakov. Minakov had not defended the title since April 2014.

Quarter-finals
(United States) Ryan Bader	KO
(United States) Muhammed Lawal	1
(United States) Matt Mitrione	MD
(United States) Roy Nelson	3
(Russia) Fedor Emelianenko	TKO
(United States) Frank Mir	1
(United States) Chael Sonnen	UD
(United States) Rampage Jackson	3

Semi-finals
(United States) Ryan Bader	UD
(United States) Matt Mitrione	3
(Russia) Fedor Emelianenko	TKO
(United States) Chael Sonnen	1

Final
(United States) Ryan Bader	KO
(Russia) Fedor Emelianenko	1

== Bellator Welterweight World Grand Prix Tournament ==
In 2018, Bellator organised the 2018–2019 Welterweight Grand Prix that will crown the Bellator Welterweight champion. All fights will be five rounds. If Rory MacDonald were to lose, the victor will be declared lineal champion until he loses or wins the tournament and becomes undisputed champion.

Quarter-finals
(Brazil) Douglas Lima	SUB
(Russia) Andrey Koreshkov	5
(United Kingdom) Michael Page	UD
(United Kingdom) Paul Daley	5
(Canada) Rory MacDonald (c)	DRAW
(United States) Jon Fitch	5
(Brazil) Neiman Gracie	SUB
(United States) Ed Ruth	4

Semi-finals
(Brazil) Douglas Lima	KO
(United Kingdom) Michael Page	2
(Canada) Rory MacDonald (c)	UD
(Brazil) Neiman Gracie	5

Final
(Brazil) Douglas Lima	UD
(Canada) Rory MacDonald (c)	5

- Lorenz Larkin versus Ion Pascu took place to determine a tournament alternate, with Larkin winning to stand as the alternate.
- Champion Rory MacDonald retained his title in a majority draw. He advanced to fight Neiman Gracie.

== Bellator 192 ==
Bellator 192: Rampage vs. Sonnen
- Date: January 20, 2018
- Venue: The Forum
- City: Inglewood, California
- Attendance: 12,438
- Total gate: $1,216,817

Bellator 192: Rampage vs. Sonnen took place on January 20, 2018 at The Forum in Inglewood, California. The event aired on Paramount Network as the first Bellator event to air on the network since its re-branding from Spike.

Background

This card featured the first bout in the 2018 Bellator Heavyweight World Grand Prix Tournament.

Results

Fight card
Weight class				Method	Round	Time	Notes
Heavyweight	Chael Sonnen	def.	Quinton Jackson	Decision (unanimous) (29–28, 29–28, 29–28)	3	5:00	(Note: Bellator Heavyweight World Grand Prix Quarterfinal.)
Welterweight	Rory MacDonald	def.	Douglas Lima (c)	Decision (unanimous) (48–47, 49–45, 49–46)	5	5:00	(Note: For the Bellator Welterweight Championship)
Lightweight	Michael Chandler	def.	Goiti Yamauchi	Decision (unanimous) (30–26, 30–26, 30–25)	3	5:00
Featherweight	Aaron Pico	def.	Shane Kruchten	TKO (body punch)	1	0:37
Featherweight	Henry Corrales	def.	Georgi Karakhanyan	Decision (unanimous) (30–27, 29–28, 29–28)	3	5:00
Preliminary card (Paramount Network.com)
Welterweight	Guilherme Vasconcelos	def.	Ivan Castillo	Submission (arm-triangle choke)	1	4:12
Welterweight	Devon Brock	def.	Khonry Gracie	Decision (unanimous) (30–27, 29–28, 29–28)	3	5:00
Welterweight	Jose Campos	def.	Haim Gozali	Decision (unanimous) (30–27, 30–27, 30–27)	3	5:00
Welterweight	Joey Davis	def.	Ian Butler	TKO (spinning back kick to the body and punches)	1	0:39
Postliminary card (Dark Bouts)
Lightweight	Gabriel Green	def.	Chris Padilla	Submission (rear-naked choke)	1	2:46
Featherweight	Cooper Gibson	def.	Andrew Lazo	Submission (guillotine choke)	1	2:43
Bantamweight	Chad George	def.	James Barnes	TKO (doctor stoppage)	2	5:00
Lightweight	Roosevelt Roberts	def.	Tommy Aaron	TKO (punches)	1	N/A
Lightweight	Jalin Turner	def.	Noah Tillis	TKO (punches)	1	1:12
Lightweight	Arthur Estrazulas	def.	Mike Segura	Submission (rear-naked choke)	2	2:57
Catchweight (128 lb)	Kyle Estrada	def.	David Duran	Decision (unanimous) (29–28, 29–28, 29–28)	3	5:00
Welterweight	Johnny Cisneros	def.	Marlen Magee	Submission (rear-naked choke)	3	2:28
Lightweight	Jean-Paul Le-Bosnoyani	def.	Isaiah Culpepper	Submission (armbar)	3	2:11	(Note: Amateur bout)

== Bellator 193 ==
Bellator 193: Larkin vs. Gonzalez
- Date: January 26, 2018
- Venue: Pechanga Resort and Casino
- City: Temecula, California
- Attendance: 1,204
- Total gate: $307,822

Bellator 193: Larkin vs. Gonzalez took place on January 26, 2018 at the Pechanga Resort and Casino in Temecula, California. The event aired live in prime time on Paramount Network.

Background

A Lightweight bout between Eugene Correa and Joao Paulo Faria was planned for the undercard of this event, but was canceled for undisclosed reasons.

Despite a 180-pound catchweight limit installed in the main event, headliner Fernando Gonzalez still missed weight. It was his third consecutive weight cut miss.

Results

Fight card
Weight class				Method	Round	Time	Notes
Catchweight (180 lb)	Lorenz Larkin	def.	Fernando Gonzalez	Decision (unanimous) (29–28, 30–27, 30–27)	3	5:00
Lightweight	Saad Awad	def.	J.J. Ambrose	Decision (unanimous) (30–27, 30–27, 30–27)	3	5:00
Middleweight	A.J. Matthews	def.	Kendall Grove	Decision (split) (29–28, 28–29, 30–27)	3	5:00
Lightweight	Jake Smith	def.	Steve Kozola	KO (punches)	1	0:57
Preliminary card (Paramount Network.com)
Heavyweight	Tyrell Fortune	def.	Joe Hernandez	Decision (unanimous) (30–26, 30–26, 30–26)	3	5:00
Catchweight (215 lb)	Tyree Fortune	def.	Michael Quintero	Decision (unanimous) (29–28, 29–28, 29–28)	3	5:00
Postliminary card (Dark Bouts)
Heavyweight	Everett Cummings	def.	Ben Beebe	TKO (punches)	1	2:12
Lightweight	Joshua Jones	def.	DeMarcus Brown	Submission (neck crank)	1	3:02
Middleweight	Moses Murrietta	def.	Chris Herrera	TKO (punches)	1	2:40
Featherweight	Mike Andaya	def.	Julio Aguilera	Decision (unanimous)	3	5:00
Featherweight	Mark Vorgeas	def.	Tim Riscen	KO (punches)	1	2:57
Featherweight	Justin Lawrence	def.	Andrew Natividad	Decision (unanimous)	3	5:00

== Bellator 194 ==
Bellator 194: Mitrione vs. Nelson 2
- Date: February 16, 2018
- Venue: Mohegan Sun Arena
- City: Uncasville, Connecticut
- Attendance: 9,233
- Total gate: $964,849

Bellator 194: Mitrione vs. Nelson 2 took place on February 16, 2018 at the Mohegan Sun Arena in Uncasville, Connecticut. The event aired live in prime time on Paramount Network.

Background

This card featured the second bout in the 2018 Bellator Heavyweight World Grand Prix Tournament. Matt Mitrione and Roy Nelson previously fought under the UFC banner in December 2012 with Nelson winning by TKO in the first round.

Results

Fight card
Weight class				Method	Round	Time	Notes
Heavyweight	Matt Mitrione	def.	Roy Nelson	Decision (majority) (28–28, 29–28, 29–28)	3	5:00	(Note: Bellator Heavyweight World Grand Prix Quarterfinal.)
Lightweight	Patricky Freire	def.	Derek Campos	TKO (punches)	1	2:23
Women's Flyweight	Heather Hardy	def.	Ana Julaton	Decision (unanimous) (29–28, 30–27, 30–27)	3	5:00
Light Heavyweight	Vadim Nemkov	def.	Liam McGeary	TKO (leg kicks)	3	4:02
Featherweight	Tywan Claxton	def.	Jose Perez	TKO (elbows)	2	3:39
Preliminary card (Paramount Network.com)
Lightweight	Ross Richardson	def.	Ronie Arana Leon	TKO (punches)	2	1:41
Bantamweight	Mike Kimbel	def.	Geoffrey Then	TKO (slam and punches)	1	1:03
Featherweight	Regivaldo Carvalho	def.	Thomas English	KO (punches)	1	0:17
Light Heavyweight	Jarod Trice	def.	Walter Howard	Decision (majority) (28–28, 29–27, 29–27)	3	5:00	(Note: Howard was deducted a point for an eye poke.)
Lightweight	Marcus Surin	def.	Dean Hancock	Submission (arm-triangle choke)	2	4:50
Catchweight (165 lb)	Kastriot Xhema	def.	Peter Nascimento	TKO (punches)	1	3:52
Middleweight	Pat Casey	def.	Tyler Hamilton	Decision (unanimous) (30–27, 30–27, 30–27)	3	5:00

== Bellator 195 ==
Bellator 195: Caldwell vs Higo
- Date: March 2, 2018
- Venue: WinStar World Casino
- City: Thackerville, Oklahoma
- Attendance: 1,120
- Total gate: $202,884

Bellator 195: Caldwell vs. Higo took place on March 2, 2018 at the WinStar World Casino in Thackerville, Oklahoma. The event aired live in prime time on Paramount Network.

Background

The event was headlined by Bantamweight champion Darrion Caldwell making the first defense of his title against Pitbull brothers' protege Leandro Higo.

Results

Fight card
Weight class				Method	Round	Time	Notes
Bantamweight	Darrion Caldwell (c)	def.	Leandro Higo	Submission (guillotine choke)	1	2:36	(Note: For the Bellator Bantamweight Championship.)
Bantamweight	Joe Taimanglo	def.	Joe Warren	Decision (split) (30–27, 28–29, 30–27)	3	5:00
Women's Flyweight	Kristina Williams	def.	Emily Ducote	Decision (split) (29–28, 27–30, 29–28)	3	5:00
Featherweight	Juan Archuleta	def.	William Joplin	Decision (unanimous) (30–26, 30–24, 30–23)	3	5:00
Preliminary card (Paramount Network.com)
Featherweight	Aaron Webb	def.	Thomas Lopez	KO (punches)	1	3:11
Middleweight	Kevin Holland	def.	Teagan Dooley	Submission (triangle choke)	1	2:59
Featherweight	Daniel Carey	def.	Cris Williams	Decision (unanimous) (29–28, 29–28, 29–28)	3	5:00
Middleweight	Romero Cotton	def.	Justin Reeser	Submission (rear-naked choke)	2	4:35
Catchweight (175 lb)	Fernando Gonzalez Trevino	def.	Armando Servin	Submission (armbar)	1	2:24
Welterweight	Justin Patterson	def.	Brian Grinnell	TKO (strikes)	1	4:49
Women’s Catchweight (127 lb)	Ky Bennett	def.	Morgan Solis	Submission (americana)	2	3:37

== Bellator Monster Energy Fight Series: Atlanta ==
Bellator Monster Energy Fight Series: Atlanta
- Date: March 3, 2018
- Venue: Georgia World Congress Center
- City: Atlanta, Georgia

Bellator Monster Energy Fight Series: Atlanta was the fifth installment of the series held on March 3, 2018 at the Georgia World Congress Center in Atlanta, Georgia prior to the Monster Energy AMA Supercross.

Results

Fight card
Weight class				Method	Round	Time	Notes
Middleweight	Joseph Creer	def.	Devorious Tubbs	Decision (split) (28–29, 29–28, 29–28)	3	5:00
Bantamweight	Devante Sewell	def.	Zac Cooper	Submission (guillotine choke)	3	1:21
Featherweight	Mike Galitello	def.	John Vaughn	Submission (rear-naked choke)	1	3:12

== Bellator 196 ==
Bellator 196: Henderson vs. Huerta
- Date: April 6, 2018
- Venue: BOK Hall
- City: Budapest, Hungary
- Attendance: 8,314
- Total gate: 247,697,385£ (HFT) $872,970 (USD)

Bellator 196: Henderson vs. Huerta took place on April 6, 2018 at BOK Hall in Budapest, Hungary. The event aired on tape delay in prime time on Paramount Network.

Background

Bellator 196 featured a lightweight main event between Benson Henderson and Roger Huerta, returning to the promotion after a 7 year absence. The original main event between Ádám Borics and James Gallagher was cancelled after a wrist injury was sustained by Gallagher during training.

Results

Fight card
Weight class				Method	Round	Time	Notes
Lightweight	Benson Henderson	def.	Roger Huerta	Submission (guillotine choke)	2	0:49
Featherweight	Ádám Borics	def.	Teodor Nikolov	KO (flying knee)	2	2:30
Women's Flyweight	Denise Kielholtz	def.	Petra Částková	Decision (unanimous) (30–27, 30–27, 30–27)	3	5:00
Featherweight	Brian Moore	def.	Giorgio Belsanti	Submission (guillotine choke)	1	2:46
Catchweight (175 lb)	Ed Ruth	def.	Ion Pascu	Decision (unanimous) (29–28, 30–27, 30–27)	3	5:00
Preliminary card (Paramount Network.com)
Middleweight	Norbert Növényi Jr.	def.	Mehmet Yueksel	Submission (rear-naked choke)	1	4:42
Bellator Kickboxing 9 fight card
Welterweight (Kickboxing)	Raymond Daniels (c)	def.	Djibril Ehouo	Decision (unanimous) (50–43, 50–44, 50–44)	5	3:00	(Note: For the Bellator Kickboxing Welterweight Championship.)
Super-heavyweight (Kickboxing)	Alexey Ignashov	def.	Dževad Poturak	Decision (split) (28–29, 29–28, 29–28)	3	3:00
Women's Flyweight (Kickboxing)	Sabriye Sengul	def.	Renata Rakoczi	Decision (split) (28–29, 29–28, 29–28)	3	3:00
Middleweight (Kickboxing)	Eder Lopes	def.	John Wayne Parr	Decision (unanimous) (30–27, 29–28, 29–28)	3	3:00
Women's Featherweight (Kickboxing)	Jorina Baars	def.	Athina Efmorfiadi	TKO (referee stoppage)	2	2:28

== Bellator 197 ==
Bellator 197: Chandler vs. Girtz
- Date: April 13, 2018
- Venue: Family Arena
- City: St. Charles, Missouri
- Attendance: 9,712
- Total gate: $968,772

Bellator 197: Chandler vs. Girtz took place on April 13, 2018 at the Family Arena in St. Charles, Missouri. The event aired live in prime time on Paramount Network.

Background

Michael Chandler was scheduled to face Brent Primus in a rematch for the Lightweight title. However, on March 21, Primus pulled out of the fight due to a knee injury. As a result, Brandon Girtz stepped in as a replacement.

Results

Fight card
Weight class				Method	Round	Time	Notes
Lightweight	Michael Chandler	def.	Brandon Girtz	Submission (arm-triangle choke)	1	4:00
Featherweight	A.J. McKee	def.	Justin Lawrence	Decision (unanimous) (30–27, 30–27, 30–27)	3	5:00
Welterweight	Logan Storley	def.	Joaquin Buckley	Decision (unanimous) (30–27, 30–26, 30–26)	3	5:00
Catchweight (160 lb)	Kevin Ferguson Jr.	def.	Devon Brock	Submission (rear-naked choke)	1	1:34
Preliminary card (Paramount Network.com)
Women's Flyweight	Juliana Velasquez	def.	Rebecca Ruth	TKO (body kick)	3	0:19
Catchweight (165 lb)	Derek Anderson	def.	Zak Bucia	Decision (unanimous) (30–27, 30–27, 30–27)	3	5:00
Bantamweight	Dominic Mazzotta	def.	Josh Sampo	Decision (unanimous) (30–27, 30–27, 30–27)	3	5:00
Bantamweight	Eric Ellington	def.	Jordan Howard	Decision (split) (29–28, 28–29, 29–28)	3	5:00
Postliminary card (Dark Bouts)
Catchweight (140 lb)	A.J. Siscoe	def.	Justin Robbins	Submission (rear-naked choke)	2	4:34
Welterweight	Jordan Dowdy	def.	Jeff Crotty	Submission (rear-naked choke)	1	0:29
Catchweight (189 lb)	Adam Cella	def.	DeWayne Diggs	TKO (punches)	1	4:27
Catchweight (151 lb)	Cort Wahle	def.	Joe Roye	Submission (guillotine choke)	1	0:21

== Bellator 198 ==
Bellator 198: Fedor vs. Mir
- Date: April 28, 2018
- Venue: Allstate Arena
- City: Rosemont, Illinois
- Attendance: 13,014
- Total gate: $1,285,133

Bellator 198: Fedor vs. Mir took place on April 28, 2018 at the Allstate Arena in Rosemont, Illinois. The event aired live in prime time on Paramount Network.

Background

Rafael Lovato Jr. was originally scheduled to face John Salter on this card. However, Salter was pulled by the Illinois Athletic Commission due to an eye issue on April 24 and replaced by Gerald Harris. Due to the lateness of the rebooking, the bout was contested at a catchweight of 188 pounds.

Results

Fight card
Weight class				Method	Round	Time	Notes
Heavyweight	Fedor Emelianenko	def.	Frank Mir	KO (punches)	1	0:48	(Note: Bellator Heavyweight World Grand Prix Quarterfinal.)
Featherweight	Emmanuel Sanchez	def.	Sam Sicilia	Submission (arm-triangle choke)	1	3:52
Catchweight (188 lb)	Rafael Lovato Jr.	def.	Gerald Harris	Submission (armbar)	1	1:11
Welterweight	Neiman Gracie	def.	Javier Torres	Submission (arm-triangle choke)	2	3:18
Catchweight (175 lb)	Dillon Danis	def.	Kyle Walker	Submission (toe hold)	1	1:38
Preliminary card (Paramount Network.com)
Welterweight	Sultan Umar	def.	Tom Angeloff	Decision (unanimous) (30–26, 30–27, 30–27)	3	5:00
Heavyweight	Robert Morrow	def.	Adam Maciejewski	Decision (unanimous) (29–28, 29–28, 29–28)	3	5:00
Featherweight	Adil Benjilany	def.	Corey Jackson	Decision (unanimous) (30–27, 29–28, 29–28)	3	5:00
Welterweight	Mark Stoddard	def.	Dan Stittgen	Submission (triangle choke)	1	4:43
Catchweight (150 lb)	Eric Wisely	def.	Morgan Sickinger	Submission (armbar)	1	1:12
Flyweight	Joey Diehl	def.	Nate Williams	Submission (triangle choke)	1	0:54
Featherweight	Asef Askar	vs.	Andrew Johnson	Draw (majority) (29–28, 28–28, 28–28)	3	5:00
Welterweight	R'Mandel Cameron	def.	P. J. Cajigas	Decision (unanimous) (30–27, 29–28, 29–28)	3	5:00
Postliminary card (Dark Bouts)
Lightweight	James Bennett	def.	Dustin Stusse	TKO (strikes)	1	2:48

== Bellator 199 ==
Bellator 199: Bader vs. King Mo
- Date: May 12, 2018
- Venue: SAP Center
- City: San Jose, California
- Attendance: 11,794
- Total gate: $1,102,739

Bellator 199: Bader vs. King Mo took place on May 12, 2018 at the SAP Center in San Jose, California. The event aired live in prime time on Paramount Network.

Background

This card featured the fourth and final bout in the opening round of the 2018 Bellator Heavyweight World Grand Prix Tournament as Light Heavyweight Champion Ryan Bader moved up to face Muhammed Lawal.

Results

Fight card
Weight class				Method	Round	Time	Notes
Heavyweight	Ryan Bader	def.	Muhammed Lawal	TKO (punches)	1	0:15	(Note: Bellator Heavyweight World Grand Prix Quarterfinal.)
Welterweight	Jon Fitch	def.	Paul Daley	Decision (unanimous) (29–27, 29–26, 29–26)	3	5:00
Featherweight	Aaron Pico	def.	Lee Morrison	TKO (punches)	1	1:10
Heavyweight	Cheick Kongo	def.	Javy Ayala	KO (punches)	1	2:29
Lightweight	Adam Piccolotti	def.	Carrington Banks	Submission (rear-naked choke)	3	4:41
Preliminary card (Paramount Network.com)
Middleweight	Jordan Williams	def.	Brandon Hester	TKO (punches)	2	1:11
Women's Featherweight	Amber Leibrock	def.	Janay Harding	Decision (unanimous) (30–27, 30–26, 30–26)	3	5:00
Catchweight (165 lb)	James Terry	def.	Danasabe Mohammed	Decision (unanimous) (30–26, 30–26, 30–26)	3	5:00
Featherweight	Gaston Bolanos	def.	Malcolm Hill	TKO (leg kicks)	1	2:54
Bantamweight	Justin Tenedora	def.	David Rivera-Cruz	Submission (triangle choke)	1	4:27
Catchweight (192 lb)	Deron Winn	def.	Ahmed White	KO (punch)	1	2:32
Postliminary card (Dark Bouts)
Catchweight (140 lb)	Hyder Amil	def.	Elias Anderson	TKO (doctor stoppage)	2	3:01
Featherweight	Ignacio Ortiz	def.	Matt Aragoni	KO (punches)	3	2:57
Flyweight	Mark Climaco	def.	Daniel Oseguera	TKO (punches)	1	2:21
Lightweight	J.J. Okanovich	def.	Hugo Lujan	Decision (unanimous)	3	5:00
Welterweight	Thomas Ponce de Leon	def.	Dominic Sumner	TKO (punches)	2	2:48
Bantamweight	Nohelin Hernandez	def.	Josh San Diego	Decision (unanimous)	3	5:00
Flyweight	Josh Paiva	def.	Adam Antolin	KO (head kick and punches)	1	0:32
Bantamweight	Cass Bell	def.	Khai Wu	Submission (strikes)	2	3:27

== Bellator 200 ==
Bellator 200: Carvalho vs. Mousasi
- Date: May 25, 2018
- Venue: The SSE Arena, Wembley
- City: London, England
- Attendance: 11,623
- Total gate: 844,744£ (GBP) $1,086,751 (USD)

Bellator 200: Carvalho vs. Mousasi took place on May 25, 2018 at the SSE Arena, Wembley in London, England. The event aired on tape delay in prime time on Paramount Network.

Background

This card was expected to be headlined by a rematch between Mirko Cro Cop and Roy Nelson. The pair previously fought in October 2011 at UFC 137 with Nelson winning by TKO. The bout was also expected to serve as an alternate bout for the 2018 Bellator Heavyweight World Grand Prix Tournament. However, the bout was scrapped during the week leading up to the event as Cro Cop pulled out of the fight citing an injury.

Results

Fight card
Weight class				Method	Round	Time	Notes
Middleweight	Gegard Mousasi	def.	Rafael Carvalho (c)	TKO (punches)	1	3:35	(Note: For the Bellator Middleweight Championship.)
Welterweight	Michael Page	def.	David Rickels	TKO (retirement)	2	0:43
Catchweight (165 lb)	Aaron Chalmers	def.	Ash Griffiths	Technical Submission (guillotine choke)	1	1:54
Middleweight	Mike Shipman	def.	Carl Noon	TKO (punches)	1	0:10
Women's Flyweight	Kate Jackson	def.	Anastasia Yankova	Decision (unanimous) (30–26, 30–26, 29–27)	3	5:00
Light Heavyweight	Phil Davis	def.	Linton Vassell	KO (head kick)	3	1:05
Preliminary card (Paramount Network.com)
Welterweight	Jahreau Shephard	def.	Marcin Zywica	TKO (doctor stoppage)	1	5:00
Welterweight	Walter Gahadza	def.	Kent Kauppinen	Submission (rear-naked choke)	2	2:04
Flyweight	Amir Albazi	def.	Iurie Bejenari	Submission (rear-naked choke)	1	3:21
Lightweight	Charlie Leary	def.	Tom Green	TKO (punches)	2	4:58
Middleweight	Charlie Ward	def.	Martin Hudson	TKO (punches)	1	2:23
Featherweight	Pedro Carvalho	def.	Daniel Crawford	Decision (split) (28–29, 29–28, 29–28)	3	5:00
Middleweight	Anatoly Tokov	def.	Vladimir Filipovic	Technical Submission (guillotine choke)	1	0:56
Middleweight	Costello van Steenis	def.	Kevin Fryer	TKO (punches)	1	1:20
Featherweight	Mike Ekundayo	def.	Tom Mearns	TKO (arm injury)	2	1:02

== Bellator 201 ==
Bellator 201: Macfarlane vs. Lara
- Date: June 29, 2018
- Venue: Pechanga Resort and Casino
- City: Temecula, California
- Attendance: 1,200
- Total gate: $312,080

Bellator 201: Macfarlane vs. Lara took place on June 29, 2018 at the Pechanga Resort and Casino in Temecula, California. The event aired live in prime time on Paramount Network.

Background

Results

Fight card
Weight class				Method	Round	Time	Notes
Women's Flyweight	Ilima-Lei Macfarlane (c)	def.	Alejandra Lara	Submission (armbar)	3	3:55	(Note: For the Bellator Women's Flyweight Championship.)
Catchweight (160 lb)	Saad Awad	def.	Ryan Couture	TKO (punches)	1	4:29
Women's Flyweight	Valérie Létourneau	def.	Kristina Williams	Decision (unanimous) (29–28, 29–28, 29–28)	3	5:00
Featherweight	Juan Archuleta	def.	Robbie Peralta	KO (punches)	3	0:14
Preliminary card (Paramount Network.com)
Featherweight	Jay Jay Wilson	def.	David Conte	Submission (rear-naked choke)	1	0:59
Welterweight	Ed Ruth	def.	Andy Murad	TKO (punches)	2	4:59
Welterweight	Joey Davis	def.	Craig Plaskett	Decision (unanimous) (30–26, 30–26, 30–26)	3	5:00
Heavyweight	Tyrell Fortune	def.	Giovanni Suran	TKO (punches)	2	4:35
Postliminary card (Paramount Network.com)
Women's Strawweight	Keri Taylor-Melendez	def.	Tiani Valle	Submission (rear-naked choke)	1	2:46
Light Heavyweight	Jordan Young	def.	Jamal Pogues	Submission (triangle choke)	3	3:15
Postliminary card (Dark Bouts)
Lightweight	Jacob Rosales	def.	Joshua Jones	Decision (unanimous)	3	5:00
Bantamweight	Ricky Furar	def.	Victor Rosa	Decision (unanimous)	3	5:00

== Bellator 202 ==
Bellator 202: Budd vs. Nogueira
- Date: July 13, 2018
- Venue: WinStar World Casino
- City: Thackerville, Oklahoma
- Attendance: 1,050
- Total gate: $201,094

Bellator 202: Budd vs. Nogueira took place on July 13, 2018 at the WinStar World Casino in Thackerville, Oklahoma. The event aired live in prime time on Paramount Network.

Background

Originally Stephanie Geltmacher was scheduled to face Deborah Kouzmin. However, on the week of the event Kouzmin announced that she was injured. Bellator could not find a replacement for Geltmacher in time for the event.

Results

Fight card
Weight class				Method	Round	Time	Notes
Women's Featherweight	Julia Budd (c)	def.	Talita Nogueira	TKO (punches)	3	4:07	(Note: For the Bellator Women's Featherweight Championship.)
Bantamweight	Michael McDonald	def.	Eduardo Dantas	KO (punches)	1	0:58
Middleweight	Chris Honeycutt	def.	Leo Leite	Decision (unanimous) (30–25, 30–25, 30–25)	3	5:00
Heavyweight	Valentin Moldavsky	def.	Ernest James	TKO (punches)	1	4:03
Preliminary card (Paramount Network.com)
Lightweight	Will Morris	def.	Charles Williams	Decision (unanimous) (30–25, 30–27, 30–26)	3	5:00
Women's Flyweight	Veta Arteaga	def.	Emily Ducote	Decision (unanimous) (29–27, 30–27, 30–27)	3	5:00
Welterweight	Yaroslav Amosov	def.	Gerald Harris	Decision (unanimous) (30–26, 30–27, 30–27)	3	5:00
Lightweight	Steve Kozola	def.	Ryan Walker	TKO (punches)	1	1:45
Heavyweight	Rudy Schaffroth	def.	Jon Hill	TKO (strikes)	1	0:42
Welterweight	Tyler Ingram	def.	Fernando Gonzalez Trevino	Submission (rear-naked choke)	2	4:13
Lightweight	Nation Gibrick	def.	Luis Erives	Submission (heel hook)	1	1:30
Postliminary card (Dark Bouts)
Featherweight	Daniel Carey	def.	Aaron Webb	Submission (rear-naked choke)	2	2:54

== Bellator 203 ==
Bellator 203: Pitbull vs. Weichel 2
- Date: July 14, 2018
- Venue: Foro Italico
- City: Rome, Italy
- Attendance: 10,140
- Total gate: 939,567€ (ITL) $1,059,630 (USD)

Bellator 203: Pitbull vs. Weichel 2 took place on July 14, 2018 at the Foro Italico in Rome, Italy. The event aired via tape delay in prime time on Paramount Network.

Background

The main event featured a rematch between Featherweight champion Patricio Freire and challenger Daniel Weichel. The pair previously met at Bellator 138 in June 2015, where Freire won via knockout in the second round.

Results

Fight card
Weight class				Method	Round	Time	Notes
Featherweight	Patricio Freire (c)	def.	Daniel Weichel	Decision (split) (49–46, 47–48, 48–47)	5	5:00	(Note: For the Bellator Featherweight Championship.)
Light Heavyweight	Alessio Sakara	def.	Jamie Sloane	TKO (punches)	1	1:19
Welterweight	Andrey Koreshkov	def.	Vaso Bakocevic	KO (spinning back kick)	1	1:06
Middleweight	Alen Amedovski	def.	Will Fleury	KO (punch)	1	1:39
Lightweight	Maxim Radu	def.	Simone La Preziosa	TKO (punches)	1	4:15
Catchweight (137 lb)	Michele Martignoni	def.	Simone D'Anna	KO (head kick)	1	0:06
Bellator Kickboxing 10 fight card
Featherweight (Kickboxing)	Gabriel Varga	def.	Kevin Ross (c)	TKO (referee stoppage)	1	2:09	(Note: For the Bellator Kickboxing Featherweight Championship.)
Lightweight (Kickboxing)	Giorgio Petrosyan	def.	Chingiz Allazov	Decision (unanimous) (50–44, 49–45, 49–45)	5	3:00
Lightweight (Kickboxing)	Gaston Bolanos	def.	Domenico Lomurno	Decision (unanimous) (30–27, 30–27, 30–27)	3	3:00
Women’s Flyweight (Kickboxing)	Martine Michieletto	def.	Gloria Peritore	Decision (unanimous) (29–28, 29–28, 30–27)	3	3:00
Catchweight (200 lb) (Kickboxing)	Raffaele Vitale	def.	Mattia Faraoni	Decision (majority) (29–27, 29–27, 28–28)	3	3:00
Catchweight (183 lb) (Kickboxing)	Gabriele Casella	def.	Alex Negrea	Decision (unanimous)	3	3:00
Welterweight (Kickboxing)	Davide Armanini	def.	Fatmir Gordi	Decision (unanimous)	3	3:00
Catchweight (150 lb) (Kickboxing)	Florenzo Pesare	def.	Antonio Campagna	Decision (unanimous)	3	3:00

== Bellator 204 ==
Bellator 204: Caldwell vs. Lahat
- Date: August 17, 2018
- Venue: Sanford Pentagon
- City: Sioux Falls, South Dakota
- Attendance: 3,500
- Total gate: $432,306

Bellator 204: Caldwell vs. Lahat took place on August 17, 2018 at the Sanford Pentagon in Sioux Falls, South Dakota. The event aired live in prime time on Paramount Network.

Background

The event featured Bellator Bantamweight Champion Darrion Caldwell moving up to Featherweight as he fought Noad Lahat in a non-title bout.

James Gallagher competed at Bantamweight for the first time as he fought Bellator newcomer Ricky Bandejas.

Results

Fight card
Weight class				Method	Round	Time	Notes
Featherweight	Darrion Caldwell	def.	Noad Lahat	KO (punches)	2	2:46
Welterweight	Logan Storley	def.	A.J. Matthews	TKO (elbows and punches)	2	3:56
Bantamweight	Ricky Bandejas	def.	James Gallagher	KO (head kick and punches)	1	2:49
Featherweight	Tywan Claxton	def.	Cris Lencione	Decision (unanimous) (30–27, 30–27, 30–27)	3	5:00
Preliminary card (Paramount Network.com)
Welterweight	David Michaud	def.	Corey Davis	KO (punches)	1	1:42
Welterweight	Jason Jackson	def.	Jordon Larson	TKO (punches)	1	3:52
Welterweight	DeMarques Jackson	def.	Bryce Logan	Decision (split) (28–29, 29–28, 30–27)	3	5:00
Lightweight	Omar Morales	def.	Troy Nawrocki	KO (strikes)	1	0:58
Lightweight	Micah Peatrowsky	def.	Keith Phathaem	Decision (unanimous) (30–27, 30–27, 29–28)	3	5:00
Welterweight	Tyler Ray	def.	Seth Bass	KO (strikes)	1	3:30
Middleweight	Romero Cotton	def.	Willie Whitehead	TKO (strikes)	1	4:12
Flyweight	Lloyd McKinney	def.	Robiel Tesfaldet	Submission (arm-triangle choke)	3	4:17
Welterweight	Jeff Nielsen	def.	Wyatt Meyer	TKO (Punches)	1	2:53

== Bellator 205 ==
Bellator 205: McKee vs. Macapa
- Date: September 21, 2018
- Venue: CenturyLink Arena
- City: Boise, Idaho
- Attendance: 5,403
- Total gate: $453,852

Bellator 205: McKee vs. Macapá took place on September 21, 2018 at the CenturyLink Arena in Boise, Idaho. The event aired live on Paramount Network and DAZN.

Background

The event was expected to see a featherweight main event featuring A.J. McKee and former champion Pat Curran, but Curran was pulled due to injury. McKee instead faced John Macapá.

Goiti Yamaguchi was expected to fight Patricky Freire on the card but pulled out before the fight due to injury. Freire instead faced Roger Huerta.

Results

Fight card
Weight class				Method	Round	Time	Notes
Featherweight	A.J. McKee	def.	John Macapá	KO (punch)	1	1:09
Middleweight	Rafael Lovato Jr.	def.	John Salter	Submission (rear-naked choke)	3	4:27
Women's Flyweight	Veta Arteaga	def.	Denise Kielholtz	Submission (standing guillotine choke)	2	4:24
Lightweight	Patricky Freire	def.	Roger Huerta	KO (punch)	2	0:43
Preliminary card (Paramount Network.com)
Lightweight	Johnny Nuñez	def.	Josh Wick	Decision (unanimous) (30–27, 30–27, 30–26)	3	5:00
Bantamweight	Vince Morales	def.	Justin Hugo	Decision (unanimous) (30–25, 30–27, 29–27)	3	5:00
Catchweight (147.5 lb)	Ádám Borics	def.	Josenaldo Silva	Submission (rear-naked choke)	3	1:46
Heavyweight	Steve Mowry	def.	Ben Moa	Submission (americana)	1	2:40
Catchweight (190 lb)	Jarod Trice	def.	Sean Powers	Decision (split) (29–28, 28–29, 29–28)	3	5:00
Light Heavyweight	Emillio Trevino	def.	Sua Tuani	TKO (punches)	2	1:55
Postliminary card (Dark Bouts)
Bantamweight	Stephen Stirewalt	def.	Joe Aguirre	Submission (rear-naked choke)	1	2:13
Lightweight	Bryce Edminister	def.	Leon Taylor	Submission (rear-naked choke)	2	1:34
Bantamweight	Kyle Frost	def.	David Rangel	Submission (rear-naked choke)	1	3:29
Lightweight	Nathan Stolen	def.	Andrew Cruz	Submission (armbar)	1	3:41

== Bellator 206 ==
Bellator 206: Mousasi vs. MacDonald
- Date: September 29, 2018
- Venue: SAP Center
- City: San Jose, California
- Attendance: 12,609
- Total gate: $1,248,291

Bellator 206: Mousasi vs. MacDonald took place on September 29, 2018 at the SAP Center in San Jose, California. The event streamed live on DAZN in the United States and all other regions previously served by the service, including Austria, Canada, Germany, Italy, Switzerland, and Japan, as part of a new agreement giving the service rights to seven exclusive cards per-year.

In the United Kingdom, Bellator 206 was televised by Viacom-owned Channel 5, but the telecast ceased transmission at 6:00 a.m. (in favour of preschool programming) before the main event, due to watershed regulations.

=== Background ===
The event featured a Bellator Middleweight Champion bout between the champion Gegard Mousasi and current Bellator Welterweight Champion Rory MacDonald. MacDonald was attempting to become the second multi-division champion in Bellator history, after former Bellator bantamweight and featherweight champion Joe Warren.

In addition, former UFC light heavyweight champion Quinton Jackson met rival and former PRIDE FC middleweight champion Wanderlei Silva for the fourth time in their respective careers. Going into this fight, Silva held a 2–1 advantage in the series.

This event featured the start of Bellator's inaugural welterweight grand prix tournament. Fighters expected to participate in the tournament are Rory MacDonald, Jon Fitch, Douglas Lima, Andrey Koreshkov, Paul Daley, Michael Page, Neiman Gracie, Ed Ruth, Lorenz Larkin, and Erick Silva, who replaced Yaroslav Amosov.

Don Mohammed and Salvador Becerra were scheduled to face each other in a Lightweight bout on the undercard. However, the bout was cancelled the week of the fight for undisclosed reasons.

At weight-ins, Ricky Abdelaziz weighed in at 147.3 pounds, 1.3 pounds over the featherweight non-title fight upper limit of 146 pounds. As a result, the bout proceeded catchweight. Abdelaziz was fined 20 percent of his purse which 10% went to his opponent, Laird Anderson, and 10% went to California State Athletic Commission. The bout between DeMarco Villalona and Abraham Vaesau was cancelled after Villalona did not make weight.

=== Results ===
Fight card
Weight class				Method	Round	Time	Notes
Middleweight	Gegard Mousasi (c)	def.	Rory MacDonald	TKO (punches and elbows)	2	3:23	(Note: For the Bellator Middleweight Championship.)
Heavyweight	Quinton Jackson	def.	Wanderlei Silva	TKO (punches)	2	4:32
Welterweight	Douglas Lima	def.	Andrey Koreshkov	Technical Submission (rear-naked choke)	5	3:04	(Note: Bellator Welterweight World Grand Prix Quarter-final.)
Featherweight	Aaron Pico	def.	Leandro Higo	TKO (elbow and punches)	1	3:19
Women's Strawweight	Keri Taylor-Melendez	def.	Dakota Zimmerman	Decision (split) (29–28, 28–29, 29–28)	3	5:00
Featherweight	Gaston Bolanos	def.	Ysidro Gutierrez	TKO (punches)	2	1:37
Preliminary card (DAZN)
Catchweight (160 lb)	Adam Piccolotti	def.	James Terry	Decision (unanimous) (29–28, 30–27, 30–27)	3	5:00
Bantamweight	Cass Bell	def.	Ty Costa	Submission (armbar)	2	3:00
Women's Featherweight	Arlene Blencowe	def.	Amber Leibrock	TKO (slam and punches)	3	1:23
Featherweight	Jeremiah Labiano	def.	Justin Smitley	TKO (punches)	1	3:41
Catchweight (140 lb)	Josh San Diego	def.	Joe Neal	Decision (split) (28–29, 30–27, 29–28)	3	5:00
Light Heavyweight	Chuck Campbell	def.	Joseph Ramirez	Decision (unanimous) (30–27, 30–27, 30–27)	3	5:00
Lightweight	Anthony Figueroa	def.	Samuel Romero	Decision (unanimous) (29–27, 28–26, 29–28)	3	5:00
Postliminary card (Dark Bouts)
Catchweight (147.3 Ib)	Laird Anderson	def.	Ricky Abdelaziz	Decision (split) (29–28, 28–29, 29–28)	3	5:00
Featherweight	Ignacio Ortiz	def.	Jacob Ycaro	Decision (unanimous) (29–28, 30–27, 29–28)	3	5:00
Bantamweight	Isaiah Batin-Gonzalez	def.	Khai Wu	Decision (split) (29–27, 28–29, 29–28)	3	5:00

== Bellator 207 ==
Bellator 207: Mitrione vs. Bader
- Date: October 12, 2018
- Venue: Mohegan Sun Arena
- City: Uncasville, Connecticut
- Attendance: 9,390
- Total gate: $981,255

Bellator 207: Mitrione vs. Bader took place on October 12, 2018 at the Mohegan Sun Arena in Uncasville, Connecticut. The event was live on Paramount Network and DAZN.

Background

The event saw a semi-final round bout in the Bellator Heavyweight World Grand Prix as Matt Mitrione took on current Bellator Light Heavyweight Champion Ryan Bader.

Erick Silva was expected to make his promotional debut at this event facing Lorenz Larkin in a Welterweight World Grand Prix alternate bout, but Silva pulled out due to injury. He was replaced by the Romanian fighter Ion Pascu.

Results

Fight card
Weight class				Method	Round	Time	Notes
Heavyweight	Ryan Bader	def.	Matt Mitrione	Decision (unanimous) (30–25, 30–24, 30–25)	3	5:00	(Note: Bellator Heavyweight World Grand Prix Semifinal.)
Heavyweight	Sergei Kharitonov	def.	Roy Nelson	KO (punches and knee)	1	4:59
Welterweight	Lorenz Larkin	def.	Ion Pascu	Decision (unanimous) (29–28, 29–28, 29–28)	3	5:00	(Note: Alternate bout of the Bellator Welterweight World Grand Prix.)
Lightweight	Corey Browning	def.	Kevin Ferguson Jr.	TKO (punches)	2	2:08
Lightweight	Mandel Nallo	def.	Carrington Banks	KO (knee)	2	0:57
Preliminary card (Paramount Network.com)
Middleweight	Vinicius de Jesus	def.	Tim Caron	Decision (unanimous) (30–27, 29–28, 29–28)	3	5:00
Women's Featherweight	Janay Harding	def.	Sinead Kavanagh	TKO (referee stoppage)	1	5:00
Catchweight (177 lb)	André Fialho	def.	Javier Torres	Decision (majority) (28–28, 29–28, 29–28)	3	5:00
Women's Flyweight	Sarah Click	def.	Kristi Lopez	Decision (unanimous) (30–27, 30–27, 30–27)	3	5:00
Catchweight (136.5 lb)	Michael Kimbel	def.	Alex Potts	KO (punch)	1	0:06
Women's Flyweight	Alexandra Ballou	def.	Lisa Blaine	TKO (elbows)	3	3:28
Welterweight	Pat Casey	def.	Kastriot Xhema	Decision (unanimous) (30–26, 30–26, 30–26)	3	5:00
Postliminary card (Dark bouts)
Catchweight (175 lb)	Kemran Lachinov	def.	Sean Lally	Decision (unanimous)	3	5:00

== Bellator 208 ==
Bellator 208: Fedor vs. Sonnen
- Date: October 13, 2018
- Venue: Nassau Coliseum
- City: Uniondale, New York
- Attendance: 12,966
- Total gate: $1,282,338

Bellator 208: Fedor vs. Sonnen took place on October 13, 2018 at Nassau Coliseum in Uniondale, New York. The event aired live on Paramount Network and DAZN.

Background

The event saw a semi-final bout in the Bellator Heavyweight World Grand Prix between Fedor Emelianenko and Chael Sonnen.

Robson Gracie Jr. was scheduled to make his professional MMA debut on this card against Jamal Pottinger. However, the bout was cancelled after Pottinger missed weight. A featherweight bout between Frank Buenafuente and James Gonzalez was also cancelled when both fighters came over the weight limit.

Results

Fight card
Weight class				Method	Round	Time	Notes
Heavyweight	Fedor Emelianenko	def.	Chael Sonnen	TKO (punches)	1	4:46	(Note: Bellator Heavyweight World Grand Prix Semifinal.)
Lightweight	Benson Henderson	def.	Saad Awad	Decision (unanimous) (30–27, 30–26, 30–26)	3	5:00
Heavyweight	Cheick Kongo	def.	Timothy Johnson	KO (punches)	1	1:08
Middleweight	Anatoly Tokov	def.	Alexander Shlemenko	Decision (unanimous) (30–27, 30–27, 30–27)	3	5:00
Featherweight	Henry Corrales	def.	Andy Main	KO (punches)	3	2:08
Preliminary card (Bellator.com and Bellator Mobile App)
Middleweight	Jeremy Puglia	def.	Eric Olsen	TKO (punches)	1	3:16
Lightweight	Dennis Buzukja	def.	Ryan Castro	KO (punches)	1	2:53
Welterweight	Andrews Rodriguez	def.	Mike DiOrio	Decision (unanimous) (30–27, 30–27, 30–27)	3	5:00
Flyweight	Zarrukh Adashev	def.	Christian Medina	TKO (knees and punches)	1	1:08
Women's Strawweight	Jennifer Chieng	def.	Jessica Ruiz	TKO (punches)	1	1:22
Welterweight	David Meshkhoradze	def.	Shaquan Moore	Decision (split) (30–27, 28–29, 30–27)	3	5:00
Bantamweight	Tommy Espinosa	def.	Suhrob Aidarbekov	Submission (armbar)	1	1:27
Lightweight	Nick Fiore	def.	Jerome Mickle	Decision (unanimous) (30–27, 30–27, 30–27)	3	5:00

== Bellator 209 ==
Bellator 209: Pitbull vs. Sanchez
- Date: November 15, 2018
- Venue: Menora Mivtachim Arena
- City: Tel Aviv, Israel
- Attendance: 10,844
- Total gate: ₪3,914,775 (ILS) $1,073,556 (USD)

Bellator 209: Pitbull vs. Sanchez took place on November 15, 2018 at the Menora Mivtachim Arena in Tel Aviv, Israel. The event aired on November 16, 2018 via tape delay on Paramount Network.

Background

The event featured a bout for the Bellator Featherweight Championship between champion Patrício Freire and Emmanuel Sanchez.

Haim Gozali fought Ryan Couture at the event. The two met at Bellator 180 where Couture won by a unanimous decision.

On August 20, 2018, it was reported that Olga Rubin is scheduled to meet Cindy Dandois at this event.

The event featured Vadim Nemkov coming off a spectacular win over former Bellator Light Heavyweight Champion Liam McGeary as he returned to face former Bellator Light Heavyweight champion Phil Davis.

Results

Fight card
Weight class				Method	Round	Time	Notes
Featherweight	Patrício Freire (c)	def.	Emmanuel Sanchez	Decision (unanimous) (48–46, 48–47, 48–47)	5	5:00	(Note: For the Bellator Featherweight Championship.)
Welterweight	Ryan Couture	def.	Haim Gozali	Decision (unanimous) (29–27, 30–27, 30–26)	3	5:00
Light Heavyweight	Vadim Nemkov	def.	Phil Davis	Decision (split) (29–28, 28–29, 29–28)	3	5:00
Women's Featherweight	Olga Rubin	def.	Cindy Dandois	Decision (unanimous) (29–27, 30–26, 30–27)	3	5:00
Heavyweight	Adam Keresh	def.	Kirill Sidelnikov	KO (head kick and punches)	1	1:12
Preliminary card (Bellator.com and Bellator Mobile App)
Welterweight	Jamil Ibragimov	def.	Jackie Gosh	TKO (punches)	1	1:36
Featherweight	Sidemar Honorio	def.	Liudvik Sholinian	Decision (unanimous) (30–26, 30–26, 30–26)	3	5:00
Featherweight	Denis Palancica	def.	Kirill Medvedovsky	Decision (unanimous) (29–27, 29–28, 29–28)	3	5:00
Lightweight	Aviv Gozali	def.	Anton Lazebnov	Submission (armbar)	1	4:25
Welterweight	Khonry Gracie	def.	Ron Becker	Decision (unanimous) (30–27, 29–28, 29–28)	3	5:00
Women's Strawweight	Viktoria Makarova	def.	Yulia Sachkov	TKO (punches)	1	2:38
Featherweight	Andrey Barberoshe	def.	Honor Kelesh	Decision (unanimous) (29–28, 30–27, 30–27)	3	5:00
Welterweight	Christos Nicolaou	def.	Fadi Haiyadre	TKO (punches)	1	4:48
Welterweight	Shimon Smotritsky	def.	Matan Levi	Decision (unanimous) (29–28, 30–27, 30–27)	3	5:00
Featherweight	Itzik Rubinov	def.	Ion Pop	Decision (unanimous) (29–28, 29–28, 29–28)	3	5:00
Light Heavyweight	Nika Ben Tuashy	def.	Nisim Rozalis	TKO (punches)	1	0:47

== Bellator 210 ==
Bellator 210: Njokuani vs. Salter
- Date: November 30, 2018
- Venue: WinStar World Casino and Resort
- City: Thackerville, Oklahoma
- Attendance: 1,189
- Total gate: $202,914

Bellator 210: Njokuani vs. Salter took place on November 30, 2018 at the WinStar World Casino and Resort in Thackerville, Oklahoma. The event aired live on Paramount Network and DAZN.

Background

The event was to feature a middleweight bout between Melvin Manhoef and Chidi Njokuani as the main event. However, on November 1, it was announced that Manhoef had withdrawn from the fight due to injury and was replaced by John Salter.

It was announced on October 17, 2018, a featherweight matchup between Jeremy Spoon, who makes his Bellator return, and Juan Archuleta.

On October 26, 2018, it was reported that David Rickels is scheduled to face Bomba Vasconcelos at the welterweight bout at this event.

It was announced on October 29, 2018, a women's flyweight bout is scheduled between Bruna Ellen and Kristina Williams at this event.

On October 30, 2018 it was reported that a middleweight bout between Joe Schilling and Jose Alfredo Leija would take place at this event. Leija was later replaced by Will Morris.

Results

Fight card
Weight class				Method	Round	Time	Notes
Middleweight	John Salter	def.	Chidi Njokuani	Submission (rear-naked choke)	1	4:32
Welterweight	David Rickels	def.	Guilherme Vasconcelos	Decision (unanimous) (30–27, 29–28, 29–28)	3	5:00
Women's Flyweight	Kristina Williams	def.	Bruna Ellen	Decision (unanimous) (29–28, 30–27, 30–27)	3	5:00
Featherweight	Juan Archuleta	def.	Jeremy Spoon	Decision (unanimous) (30–25, 30–26, 30–26)	3	5:00
Preliminary card (Bellator.com and Bellator Mobile App)
Middleweight	Costello van Steenis	def.	Chris Honeycutt	Decision (split) (28–29, 29–28, 29–28)	3	5:00
Light Heavyweight	Jordan Young	def.	Anthony Ruiz	Submission (rear-naked choke)	1	3:48
Lightweight	Goiti Yamauchi	def.	Daniel Weichel	Decision (split) (30–27, 27–30, 29–28)	3	5:00
Middleweight	Joe Schilling	def.	Will Morris	TKO (corner stoppage)	1	5:00
Bantamweight	Shawn Bunch	def.	Joe Warren	TKO (submission to punches)	1	1:42
Middleweight	Mike Shipman	def.	Scott Futrell	Submission (D'Arce choke)	1	2:58
Featherweight	Noad Lahat	def.	Brian Moore	Decision (unanimous) (29–28, 29–27, 29–27)	3	5:00
Postliminary card (Dark Bouts)
Featherweight	Adil Benjilany	def.	Daniel Carey	TKO (kick and punches)	2	0:43
Heavyweight	Rudy Schaffroth	def.	Vernon Lewis	KO (punches)	1	2:51
Middleweight	Gerald Harris	vs.	Hracho Darpinyan	Draw (majority) (28–29, 28–28, 28–28)	3	5:00

== Bellator 211 ==
Bellator 211: Sakara vs. Kauppinen
- Date: December 1, 2018
- Venue: RDS Stadium
- City: Genoa, Italy
- Attendance: 5,329
- Total gate: 467,889€ (ITL) $527,571 (USD)

Bellator 211: Sakara vs. Kauppinen took place on December 1, 2018 at the RDS Stadium in Genoa, Italy. The event aired live on Paramount Network and DAZN.

Background

The event featured a light heavyweight bout between Alessio Sakara and Kent Kauppinen as the main event.

A title fight between current Bellator Kickboxing featherweight champion Gabriel Varga and Shan Cangelosi also took place on the card.

On October 30, 2018, a welterweight bout between Kiefer Crosbie and Orlando D'Ambrosio was announced for this event.

A lightweight bout between Italy's Luca Vitali and SBG Ireland prospect Luka Jelcic was scheduled for the event. However, Jelcic withdrew and was replaced by Pedro Carvalho.

Results

Fight card
Weight class				Method	Round	Time	Notes
Light Heavyweight	Kent Kauppinen	def.	Alessio Sakara	KO (punch)	1	1:10
Heavyweight	Domingos Barros	def.	Hesdy Gerges	TKO (punches)	1	2:52
Lightweight	Pedro Carvalho	def.	Luca Vitali	Submission (guillotine choke)	1	0:43
Middleweight	Alen Amedovski	def.	Ibrahim Mane	KO (punch)	1	0:12
Welterweight	Kiefer Crosbie	def.	Orlando D’Ambrosio	Decision (unanimous) (30–27, 30–27, 30–27)	3	5:00
Preliminary card (Bellator.com and Bellator Mobile App)
Welterweight	Andrea Fusi	def.	Walter Pugliesi	Decision (split)	3	5:00
Welterweight	Georgio Pietrini	def.	Nemanja Milakovic	KO (punch)	1	0:20
Bellator Kickboxing 11
Featherweight (Kickboxing)	Gabriel Varga (c)	def.	Shan Cangelosi	KO (punch)	1	2:42	(Note: For the Bellator Kickboxing Featherweight Championship.)
Welterweight (Kickboxing)	Raymond Daniels	def.	Zakaria Laaouatni	Decision (majority) (29–29, 29–28, 29–28)	3	3:00	(Note: Non-title fight.)
Welterweight (Kickboxing)	Yuri Bessmertny	def.	Karim Ghajji	Decision (unanimous) (30–26, 29–27, 29–27)	3	3:00
Catchweight (176 lb) (Kickboxing)	Gabriele Casella	def.	Dani Traore	Decision (unanimous) (30–27, 29–28, 29–28)	3	3:00
Featherweight (Kickboxing)	Younes Rahmouni	def.	Tiziano Campus	Decision (majority) (28–28, 29–27, 29–27)	3	3:00
Catchweight (158 lb) (Kickboxing)	Christian Zahe	def.	Samuel Toscano	KO (punch)	1	2:20

== Bellator 212 ==
Bellator and USO Present: Primus vs. Chandler 2
- Date: December 14, 2018
- Venue: Neal S. Blaisdell Arena
- City: Honolulu, Hawaii
- Attendance: 8,293
- Total gate: $912,230

Bellator and USO Present: Primus vs. Chandler 2 took place on December 14, 2018 at the Neal S. Blaisdell Arena in Honolulu, Hawaii in conjunction with the USO. The event was live on Paramount Network and DAZN.

Background

The event featured a Bellator Lightweight Championship bout between the champion Brent Primus and former champion Michael Chandler. The rematch was scheduled for Bellator 197, but Primus pulled out due to injury.

A women's flyweight bout between former title contender Alejandra Lara and Juliana Velasquez was also announced for the card.

On November 19, 2018, it was announced Sam Sicilia will face Derek Campos at this event.

Results

Fight card
Weight class				Method	Round	Time	Notes
Lightweight	Michael Chandler	def.	Brent Primus (c)	Decision (unanimous) (50–45, 50–45, 50–45)	5	5:00	(Note: For the Bellator Lightweight Championship.)
Heavyweight	Javy Ayala	def.	Frank Mir	TKO (submission to punches)	2	4:30
Featherweight	A.J. McKee	def.	Daniel Crawford	Submission (anaconda choke)	1	3:19
Women's Flyweight	Juliana Velasquez	def.	Alejandra Lara	Decision (split) (28–29, 29–28, 30–27)	3	5:00
Featherweight	Sam Sicilia	def.	Derek Campos	Decision (split) (28–29, 29–28, 29–28)	3	5:00
Preliminary card (Bellator.com and Bellator Mobile App)
Featherweight	Toby Misech	def.	Edward Thommes	TKO (flying knee and punches)	3	2:25
Featherweight	Tywan Claxton	def.	Kaeo Meyer	TKO (punches)	1	2:56
Welterweight	Robson Gracie Jr.	def.	Brysen Bolohao	Submission (rear-naked choke)	2	4:00
Lightweight	Chris Avila	def.	Brandon Pieper	Submission (rear-naked choke)	1	3:44
Postliminary card (Dark Bouts)
Featherweight	Nick Badis	def.	Paul Lopes	Submission (rear-naked choke)	1	3:13

== Bellator 213 ==
Bellator 213: Macfarlane vs. Létourneau
- Date: December 15, 2018
- Venue: Neal S. Blaisdell Arena
- City: Honolulu, Hawaii
- Attendance: 8,293
- Total gate: $912,230

Bellator 213: Macfarlane vs. Létourneau took place on December 15, 2018 at the Neal S. Blaisdell Arena in Honolulu, Hawaii. The event was live on DAZN.

Background

The event featured Honolulu native Ilima-Lei Macfarlane defending the Bellator Women's Flyweight Championship against UFC veteran Valérie Létourneau.

A middleweight bout between former champion Rafael Carvalho and UFC veteran and former UFC Light Heavyweight Champion Lyoto Machida took place at the event.

A Bellator Welterweight Grand Prix quarterfinal bout between Neiman Gracie and Ed Ruth also took place.

Bellator President Scott Coker announced on Monday, September 17, 2018 that King Mo would face former Bellator light heavyweight champion Liam McGeary at the event.

Results

Fight card
Weight class				Method	Round	Time	Notes
Women's Flyweight	Ilima-Lei Macfarlane (c)	def.	Valérie Létourneau	Submission (triangle choke)	3	3:19	(Note: For the Bellator Women's Flyweight Championship.)
Catchweight (186.5 lb)	Lyoto Machida	def.	Rafael Carvalho	Decision (split) (29–28, 28–29, 29–28)	3	5:00
Welterweight	Neiman Gracie	def.	Ed Ruth	Submission (rear-naked choke)	4	2:15	(Note: Bellator Welterweight World Grand Prix Quarter-final.)
Light Heavyweight	Liam McGeary	def.	Muhammed Lawal	TKO (punch)	3	0:53
Lightweight	Nainoa Dung	def.	Kona Oliveira	TKO (punches)	3	2:05
Preliminary card (Bellator.com and Bellator Mobile App)
Lightweight	Dustin Barca	def.	Isaac Hopps	Decision (split) (29–28, 28–29, 30–27)	3	5:00
Catchweight (180 lb)	Maki Pitolo	def.	Chris Cisneros	Submission (rear-naked choke)	3	2:40
Bantamweight	Kai Kamaka III	def.	Shojin Miki	Decision (unanimous) (29–28, 29–28, 29–28)	3	5:00
Postliminary card (Dark bouts)
Lightweight	Ryan Dela Cruz	def.	Spencer Higa	Decision	3	5:00
Light Heavyweight	Marcus Gamble	def.	Kala Hose	TKO (punches)	1	N/A
Flyweight	Russell Mizuguchi	def.	Michael Nakagawa	Decision	3	5:00
Featherweight	Canaan Kawaihae	def.	Timothy Teves	Decision (unanimous)	3	5:00
