= Bellator Kickboxing =

American kickboxing promotion company

- Type: Subsidiary
- Industry: Kickboxing promotion
- Founded: 2016
- Founder: Scott Coker
- Defunct: 2020
- Headquarters: Santa Monica, California, U.S.
- Key people: Scott Coker; President 2014–present Rich Chou; VP Talent Relations/Matchmaker
- Parent: Paramount Global
- Website: http://www.bellator.com/

Bellator Kickboxing was an American kickboxing promotion company based in Los Angeles, active between 2016 and 2019. Bellator was founded in 2016 by president Scott Coker. It was the sister promotion of Bellator MMA. On April 16, 2016, Bellator held its inaugural kickboxing event, Bellator Kickboxing 1. On February 19, 2022, Coker confirmed that the promotion shut down in 2020 to focus on MMA.

== Events ==
#	Event	Date	Venue	Location
12	Bellator Kickboxing 12	October 12, 2019	Ex Palalido (Allianz Cloud)	Milan, Italy
11	Bellator Kickboxing 11	December 1, 2018	RDS Stadium	Genova, Italy
10	Bellator Kickboxing 10	July 14, 2018	Foro Italico	Rome, Italy
9	Bellator Kickboxing 9	April 6, 2018	BOK Hall	Budapest, Hungary
8	Bellator Kickboxing 8	December 9, 2017	Nelson Mandela Forum	Florence, Italy
7	Bellator Kickboxing 7	September 23, 2017	SAP Center	(United States) San Jose, California
6	Bellator Kickboxing 6	April 14, 2017	Budapest Sports Arena	Budapest, Hungary
5	Bellator Kickboxing 5	April 8, 2017	Pala Alpitour	Torino, Italy
4	Bellator Kickboxing 4	December 10, 2016	Nelson Mandela Forum	Florence, Italy
3	Bellator Kickboxing 3	September 17, 2016	Syma Hall	Budapest, Hungary
2	Bellator Kickboxing 2	June 24, 2016	Scottrade Center	(United States) St. Louis, Missouri
1	Bellator Kickboxing 1	April 16, 2016	Pala Alpitour	Torino, Italy

== Broadcast partners ==
Bellator Kickboxing airs on Paramount Network (formerly Spike TV). Bellator Kickboxing debuted on Spike on April 16, 2016.

== Last champions ==
Division	Upper weight limit	Champion	Since	Title defenses
Light heavyweight	205 lb (93 kg; 14.6 st)	Vacant	–	
Middleweight	185 lb (84 kg; 13.2 st)	Vacant	–	
Welterweight	170 lb (77 kg; 12 st)	(United States) Raymond Daniels	September 23, 2017 (Bellator Kickboxing 7)	1
Featherweight	145 lb (66 kg; 10.4 st)	(Canada) Gabriel Varga	July 14, 2018 (Bellator Kickboxing 10)	2
Women's Flyweight	125 lb (56 kg; 9.6 st)	(Netherlands) Denise Kielholtz	December 10, 2016 (Bellator Kickboxing 4)	1

== Championship history ==
=== Welterweight Championship ===
156 pounds (71 kg) to 170 pounds (77 kg)

No.	Name	Event	Date	Reign	Defenses
1	(France) Karim Ghajji def. Mustapha Haida	Bellator Kickboxing 1 Torino, Italy	April 16, 2016	154 days	
2	(Hungary) Zoltán Laszák	Bellator Kickboxing 3 Budapest, Hungary	September 17, 2016	209 days	
3	(France) Karim Ghajji (2)	Bellator Kickboxing 6 Budapest, Hungary	April 14, 2017	162 days	
4	(United States) Raymond Daniels	Bellator Kickboxing 7 San Jose, California	September 23, 2017	749 days	1. def. Djibril Ehouo at Bellator Kickboxing 9 on April 6, 2018

=== Featherweight Championship ===
136 pounds (62 kg) to 145 pounds (66 kg)

No.	Name	Event	Date	Reign	Defenses
1	(United States) Kevin Ross def. Domenico Lomurno	Bellator Kickboxing 7 San Jose, California	September 23, 2017	295 days	
2	(Canada) Gabriel Varga	Bellator Kickboxing 10; Rome, Italy	July 14, 2018	455 days	1. def. Shan Cangelosi at Bellator Kickboxing 11 on December 1, 2018; 2. def. Cristian Faustino at Bellator Kickboxing 12 on October 12, 2019

=== Women's Flyweight Championship ===
116 pounds (53 kg) to 125 pounds (57 kg)

No.	Name	Event	Date	Reign	Defenses
1	(Netherlands) Denise Kielholtz def. Gloria Peritore	Bellator Kickboxing 4 Florence, Italy	December 10, 2016	1036 days	1. def. Martine Michieletto at Bellator Kickboxing 5 on April 8, 2017

== Notable fighters ==
=== Middleweights (185 lb, 84 kg) ===
- (Belgium) Filip Verlinden
- (United States) Joe Schilling
- (Australia) John Wayne Parr
- (Netherlands) Melvin Manhoef

=== Welterweights (170 lb, 77 kg) ===
- (France) Karim Ghajji
- (Morocco) Mustapha Haida
- (United States) Raymond Daniels

=== Lightweight (155 lb, 70 kg) ===
- (Romania) Amansio Paraschiv
- (Italy) Giorgio Petrosyan

=== Featherweights (145 lb, 65 kg) ===
- (Canada) Gabriel Varga
- (United States) Kevin Ross

=== Women's Featherweights (145 lb, 65 kg) ===
- (Netherlands) Jorina Baars

=== Women's Flyweights (125 lb, 56 kg) ===
- (Netherlands) Denise Kielholtz

== See also ==
- List of Bellator MMA events
- Kickboxing promotions
- Bellator MMA
- List of Bellator champions
