= Malaipet Sasiprapa =

Thai martial artist

Malaipet
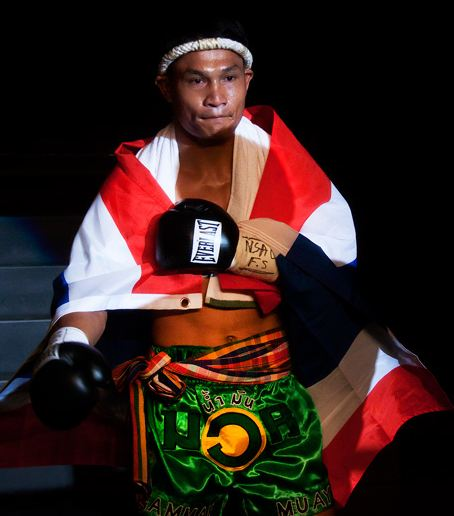
- Malaipet @ Battle in the Desert vs Michael Mananquil.
- Born: Mongkhon Wiwasuk; December 21, 1981 (age 44); Surin, Thailand
- Other names: The Diamond
- Nationality: Thai
- Height: 1.70 m (5 ft 7 in)
- Weight: 70 kg (154 lb; 11 st 0 lb)
- Division: Welterweight; Lightweight
- Reach: 69 in (180 cm)
- Style: Muay Thai
- Stance: Orthodox
- Fighting out of: Fresno, California, U.S.
- Team: Sitarvut Gym; Sasiprapa Gym; Team Diamond; Muay Thai Academy USA
- Years active: 1999-present

Kickboxing record
- Total: 183
- Wins: 146
- By knockout: 53
- Losses: 31
- By knockout: 5
- Draws: 6

Mixed martial arts record
- Total: 7
- Wins: 3
- By knockout: 1
- By decision: 2
- Losses: 4
- By knockout: 1
- By decision: 2
- By disqualification: 1

Other information
- Mixed martial arts record from Sherdog
- Last updated on: March 27, 2014

Malaipet (born as Mongkhon Wiwasuk on December 21, 1981) is a Thai professional Muay Thai fighter, kickboxer and former mixed martial artist. He is a former Rajadamnern Stadium Champion who currently resides in Fresno, California. In MMA, Malaipet has fought for EliteXC, King of the Cage and in kickboxing he has competed for K-1, SLAMM!! Events, Bellator Kickboxing and Thai & Kickbox SuperLeague. He has Three Kids, Surina, Mason, and Ariya Wiwasuk, who lives in Clovis, CA

== Biography and career ==
Malaipet started practicing Muay Thai at the age of 8. He is known for his devastating kicks and clinch and fought for EliteXC most of his MMA career. Malaipet is currently on hiatus from MMA to focus on Muay Thai. The biopic film based on his life, Legendary was released in late 2009. Malaipet is also featured in the 2011 video game Supremacy MMA. He is the older cousin of Rungravee Sasiprapa and Buakaw Banchamek.

He stopped Vishnu Gulati in the second round of their contest at Lion Fight 8 in Las Vegas on January 25, 2013.

He defeated Sean Kearney via unanimous decision at Push Kick: World Stand Off in Pomona, California, USA on March 2, 2013.

Malaipet was set to fight Hakeem Dawodu at Lion Fight 10 in Las Vegas on July 26, 2013 but Dawodu pulled out of the bout just two days before for undisclosed reasons and was replaced by Sean Kearney. Malaipet scored a knockdown with an elbow from the clinch in round two and won by majority decision.

Malaipet stopped Caio Uruguai in round one with a counter overhand right at Lion Fight 11 in Las Vegas on September 20, 2013.

He lost to Fabio Pinca by unanimous decision in a fight for the inaugural Lion Fight Welterweight Championship at Lion Fight 12 in Las Vegas on November 1, 2013.

Malaipet lost to Shane Oblonsky via UD at Lion Fight 14 in Las Vegas on March 28, 2014.

He defeated Justin Greskiewicz at Lion Fight 17 in Ledyard, Connecticut on August 1, 2014 by unanimous decision.

== Titles ==
- Rajadamnern Stadium
  - Rajadamnern Stadium Champion
- WBC Muaythai
  - WBC Muaythai International Super Welterweight Champion (one time)
  - WBC Muaythai United States Welterweight (-66.6 kg/147 lb) Championship (one time, current)
- International Kickboxing Association
  - IKBA World Champion
- International Karate Kickboxing Council
  - IKKC USA Champion
  - IKKC World Welterweight Champion
- International Muay Thai Organization
  - IMTO USA Champion
  - IMTO World Welterweight Champion

== Kickboxing record ==
Kickboxing record
146 Wins, 31 Losses, 6 Draws
Date	Result	Opponent	Event	Location	Method	Round	Time	Record
2017-09-23	Win	(Nicaragua) Jose Palacios	Bellator Kickboxing 7	San Jose, USA	Decision (unanimous)	3	3:00	9-7
2016-10-21	Loss	(Thailand) Jo Nattawut	Lion Fight 32	Las Vegas, Nevada, USA	Decision (unanimous)	5	3:00	
Fight Was for the Lion Fight Middleweight Title.
2015-07-31	Loss	(England) Liam Harrison	Lion Fight 23	California, United States	Decision (split)	5	3:00	
2015-03-27	Win	(United States) Ben Yelle	Lion Fight 21	Temecula, California, USA	Decision (unanimous)	5	3:00	
2014-08-01	Win	(United States) Justin Greskiewicz	Lion Fight 17	Ledyard, Connecticut, USA	TKO (corner stop/towel)	5	3:00	
2014-03-28	Loss	(United States) Shane Oblonsky	Lion Fight 14	Las Vegas, Nevada, USA	Decision (unanimous)	5	3:00	
2013-11-01	Loss	(France) Fabio Pinca	Lion Fight 12	Las Vegas, Nevada, USA	Decision (unanimous)	5	3:00	
For the Lion Fight Welterweight Championship.
2013-09-20	Win	(Brazil) Caio Uruguai	Lion Fight 11	Las Vegas, Nevada	TKO (overhand right)	1	1:52	5-1
2013-07-26	Win	(Canada) Sean Kearney	Lion Fight 10	Las Vegas, Nevada	Decision (majority)	5	3:00	
2013-03-02	Win	(Canada) Sean Kearney	Muay Thai World Stand Off	Pomona, California	Decision (unanimous)	5	3:00	
2013-01-25	Win	(United States) Vishnu Gulati	Lion Fight 8	Las Vegas, Nevada	TKO (low kicks)	2	1:57	
2012-05-12	Win	(United States) Justin Greskiewicz	Lion Fight 6	Las Vegas, Nevada	Decision (unanimous)	5	3:00	
2011-11-19	Win	(Nicaragua) Jose Palacios	Lion Fight 4	Las Vegas, Nevada, USA	Decision (split)	5	3:00	8-2
Wins the WBC Muaythai United States Welterweight (-66.6 kg/147 lb) Championship.
2011-07-30	Draw	(England) Tim Thomas	Elite Kickboxing	Las Vegas, Nevada	Draw	5	3:00	
2011-02-12	Loss	(United States) Michael Mananquil	Battle in the Desert, Buffalo Bills Casino	Las Vegas, Nevada	Decision (unanimous)	5	3:00	
For the WMC Welterweight Championship.
2010-12-05	Loss	(United States) Kevin Ross	King's Birthday Celebration, Commerce Casino	Los Angeles, California	Decision (unanimous)	5	3:00	
2010-10-09	Loss	(China) Xu Yan	Legends of Heroes: Muaythai vs Kung Fu, Arena of Stars, Genting Highlands	Pahang, Malaysia	Decision	3	3:00	
2010-07-18	Win	(United States) Michael Mananquil	Tuff Promotions presents: WMC Full Rules Muay Thai	Montebello, California	Decision (split)	5	3:00	
2010-04-03	Loss	(Switzerland) Christophe Pruvost	Muay Thai in America	Santa Monica, California	Decision (split)	5	3:00	
Fight was for IMTF Super-welterweight world title.
2009-12-05	Win	(United States) James Cook	WCK World Championship Muay Thai, Buffalo Bills Casino	Primm, Nevada	TKO (corner stoppage)	4	3:00	
Retains W.B.C. Muaythai International Super-Welterweight title.
2009-07-25	Win	(England) Richard Fenwick	WCK World Championship Muay Thai, Las Vegas Hilton	Las Vegas, Nevada	Decision (unanimous)	5	3:00	
Wins W.B.C. Muaythai International Super-Welterweight title.
2009-06-13	Win	(Australia) Jason Scerri	WCK: Full Rules Muaythai	Inglewood, California	TKO (doc stop/cut)	3	2:18	
2009-01-29	Loss	(England) Richard Fenwick	WCK Full Rules Muay Thai	Highland, California	Decision (split)	5	3:00	
Fight was for W.B.C. Muaythai International Super-Welterweight title.
2008-06-20	Loss	(Thailand) Yodsaenklai Fairtex	WCK: World Championship Muay Thai "Champions of Champions"	Montego Bay, Jamaica	TKO (doc stop/cut, swollen left eye)	3	3:00	
Fight was for Yodsaenklai's W.B.C. Muaythai World Super-Welterweight title.
2008-03-03	Win	(Germany) Denis Scheidmiller	SLAMM "Nederland vs Thailand IV"	Almere, Netherlands	Decision (unanimous)	5	3:00	
2008-01-12	Win	(China) Xu Yan	WCK: Full Rules Muaythai	Gardena, California	TKO (elbow injury)	1	2:43	
2007-09-08	Win	(Belgium) Jan van Denderen	WBC Muay Thai Presents: World Championship Muay Thai	Gardena, California	Decision (unanimous)	5	3:00	
2007-01-11	Win	(Japan) Masaaki Kazuya	WCK World Championship Muay Thai, San Manuel Casino	Upland, California	TKO (kicks to the body)	3	1:07	
2006-12-17	Win	(United States) Fernando Calleros	Xtream Muay Thai Challenge II	Inglewood, California	TKO (corner stop/cut)	2	3:00	
2006-09-30	Win	(China) Le Feng Chen	World Championship Muay Thai: "Ultimate Conquest"	Inglewood, California	TKO (corner stop/towel)	2	2:54	
Retains IMTC Muay Thai Super-Welterweight (155 lb) World title.
2006-07-08	Win	(Morocco) Youssef Akhnikh	WCK World Championship Muay Thai: Hot Summer Fights	Inglewood, California	Decision (unanimous)	5	3:00	
Retains IKKC Muay Thai World Jr. Middleweight title.
2006-04-01	Win	(Netherlands) Benito Caupain	WCK World Championship Muay Thai	Upland, California	Decision (unanimous)	5	3:00	
Retains IKKC Muay Thai World Welterweight.
2005-12-17	Win	(Morocco) Fikri Tijarti	WCK World Championship Muay Thai	Inglewood, California	Decision (unanimous)	5	3:00	
Retains IKKC Muay Thai World Welterweight title.
2005-08-20	Win	(United States) Danny Steele	WCK World Championship Muay Thai: Hot Summer Fights	Inglewood, California	Decision (unanimous)	5	3:00	
Wins IKKC Muay Thai World Welterweight title.
2005-05-28	Win	(Suriname) Marco Pique	WCK World Championship Muay Thai	Las Vegas, Nevada	Decision (unanimous)	5	3:00	
Elimination fight to face Jongsanan Fairtex for his I.K.K.C. Junior Welterweight Muay Thai world title.
2005-02-05	Win	(France) Tarik Benefkih	WCK World Championship Muay Thai	Las Vegas, Nevada	Decision (split)	5	3:00	
IKKC Muay Thai World Welterweight title elimination bout.
2004-12-18	Draw	(Netherlands) Chris van Venrooij	SuperLeague Netherlands 2004	Uden, Netherlands	Decision draw (injury)	1	N/A	
2004-10-23	Win	(Germany) Timo Bonfiglio	SuperLeague Germany 2004	Oberhausen, Germany	KO (head kick)	5	1:00	
2004-05-22	Loss	(England) Peter Crooke	SuperLeague Switzerland 2004	Winterthur, Switzerland	Decision (unanimous)	5	3:00	
2004-01-10	Loss	(United States) Duane Ludwig	Ring of Fire 11: Bring it On, Douglas County Event Center	Castle Rock, CO	Decision (unanimous)	5	3:00	
Fight was for vacant I.S.K.A. Muay Thai Light Middleweight world title -72.5 kg.
2003-12-06	Loss	(Netherlands) Chris van Venrooij	SuperLeague Netherlands 2003	Rotterdam, Netherlands	Decision (unanimous)	5	3:00	
2003-09-27	Win	(Sweden) Patrick Erickson	SuperLeague Germany 2003	Wuppertal, Germany	Decision (unanimous)	5	3:00	
2003-08-24	Win	(United States) James Cook	Main Event Fights 5	Fresno, California	Decision (unanimous)	5	3:00	
2003-04-27	Win	(Cuba) Eric Castaños	Ultimate Muay Thai Challenge, Table Mountain Casino	Fresno, California	KO (overhand right)	2	0:47	40-3
Retains IMTO Muay Thai World Welterweight title.
2002-11-15	Win	(United States) Craig Buchanan	WCK World Championship Muay Thai	Victorville, California	Decision (unanimous)	5	3:00	
Wins IKKC Muay Thai World Middleweight title.
2002-06-21	Win	(Mexico) Jose Osorio	Angel Marroquin Promotions	Mexico City, Mexico	KO (right hooks)	2	N/A	
2002-02-12	Win	(United States) Michael Parker	Thai Boxe Showcase	Los Angeles, California	TKO (push kick to the body)	1	1:12	
2001-09-07	Win	(Thailand) Phutawan Buriramphukaofire	Lumpinee Stadium	Bangkok, Thailand	TKO (arm injury)	1	3:00	
1999-00-00	Loss	(Thailand) Sangtanong		Bangkok, Thailand	Decision (unanimous)	5	3:00	
Legend: Win Loss Draw/No contest Notes

== Mixed martial arts record ==
Professional record breakdown
7 matches	3 wins	4 losses
By knockout	1	1
By decision	2	2
By disqualification	0	1

Res.	Record	Opponent	Method	Event	Date	Round	Time	Location	Notes
Loss	3–4	Musa Toliver	Decision (unanimous)	KOTC: Arrival	February 25, 2010	3	5:00	Highland, California, United States	
Loss	3–3	David Douglas	TKO (punches)	ShoXC: Elite Challenger Series	September 26, 2008	3	2:51	Santa Ynez, California, United States	
Loss	3–2	Thomas Denny	DQ (illegal elbows)	ShoXC: Elite Challenger Series	March 21, 2008	1	4:51	Santa Ynez, California, United States	
Win	3–1	Kaleo Kwan	Decision (unanimous)	ShoXC: Elite Challenger Series	October 26, 2007	3	5:00	Santa Ynez, California, United States	
Win	2–1	Rinat Mirzabekov	Decision (unanimous)	Independent Event	May 3, 2007	3	5:00	Highland, California, United States	
Loss	1–1	Anthony McDavitt	Decision (unanimous)	California Cage Championships	February 17, 2007	3	5:00	Santa Monica, California, United States	
Win	1–0	Zhao Zhao	KO (punches)	California Xtreme Fighting 3	August 19, 2006	1	0:48	Upland, California, United States	
