= Gabriel Varga =

Canadian kickboxer (born 1985)

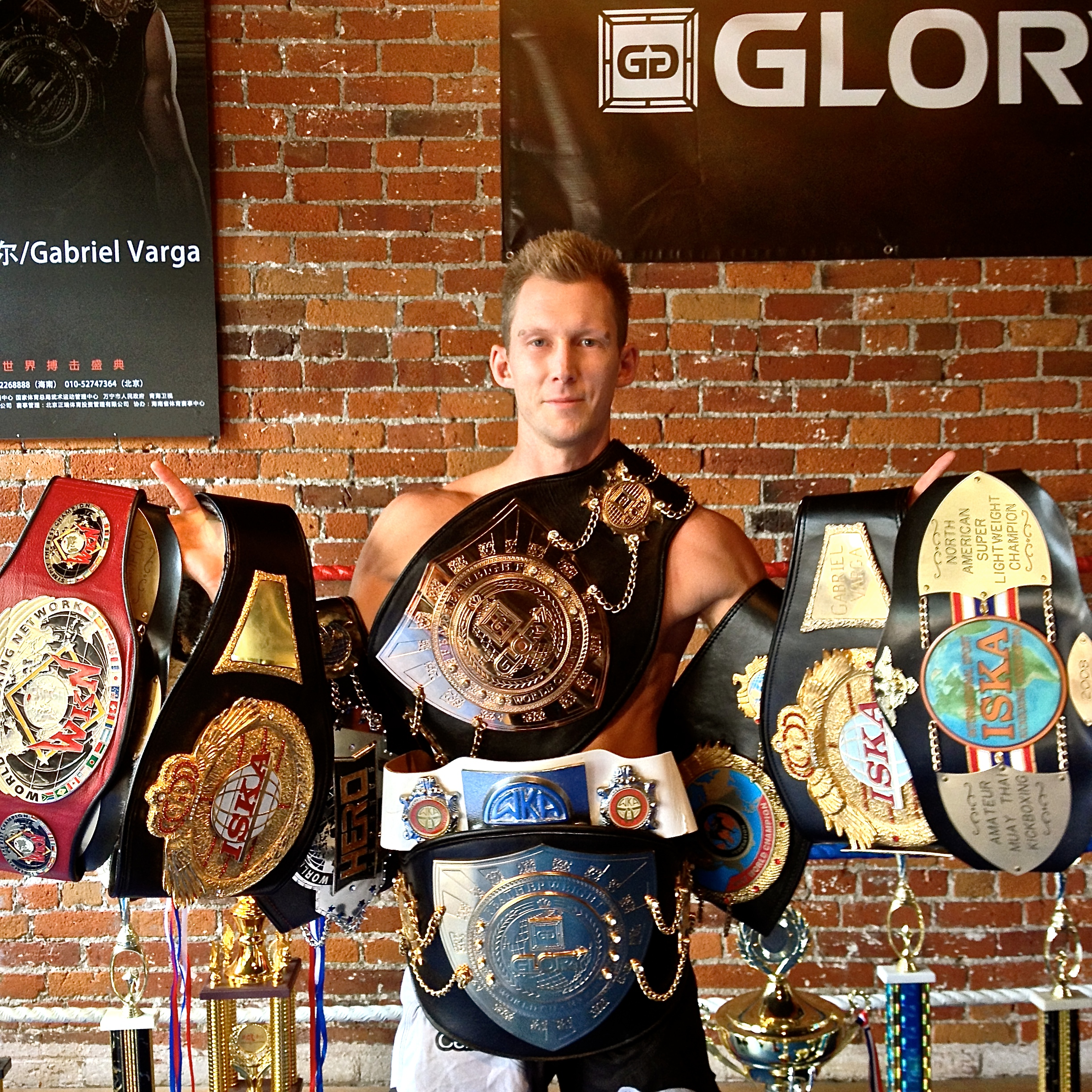
- Varga in 2016
- Born: May 16, 1985 (age 41); Toronto, Ontario, Canada
- Height: 1.78 m (5 ft 10 in)
- Weight: 64.9 kg (143 lb; 10.22 st)
- Division: Lightweight; Welterweight; Featherweight
- Reach: 73.8 in (187 cm)
- Style: Kickboxing
- Stance: Orthodox
- Fighting out of: Victoria, British Columbia, Canada
- Team: Varga Bros. Martial Arts
- Trainer: Aaron Varga
- Rank: 4th degree black belt in karate
- Years active: 2006–present

Kickboxing record
- Total: 24
- Wins: 18
- By knockout: 4
- Losses: 6
- By knockout: 1

Mixed martial arts record
- Total: 2
- Wins: 1
- By knockout: 1
- Losses: 1
- By decision: 1

Amateur record
- Total: 15
- Wins: 15
- By knockout: 7

Other information
- Mixed martial arts record from Sherdog
- Last updated on: February 3, 2018

Gabriel Varga

YouTube information
- Channel: Gabriel Varga
- Years active: 2009–present
- Genre: vlog
- Subscribers: 326 thousand
- Views: 52.5 million
- Last updated: 17 June 2025

Gabriel Varga (born May 16, 1985) is a Canadian kickboxer and mixed martial artist who competed in the lightweight division of Karate Combat. He is a former Bellator KB Featherweight champion, former two time Glory Featherweight champion, and former WKN lightweight champion.

A martial artist since his childhood, Varga started out in Shotokan karate and made the switch to kickboxing at seventeen. After becoming a Canadian, North American and two-time world champion during his amateur career, he turned professional in 2009 and won two more world championships in the pro ranks inside the space of seven months during 2011. Varga has since competed in the K-1, Glory, and Bellator Kickboxing promotions. In 2018, he started to upload videos to his YouTube channel.

== Early life ==
Varga was born in Toronto, Ontario and spent part of his childhood in Australia and New Zealand before settling in Victoria, British Columbia, in 1999. He was introduced to martial arts at an early age by his father, Keith, a boxer and karateka. Also a classically trained pianist, Varga formally began training in Shotokan at the age of eight and eventually earned the rank of fourth degree black belt. He made the switch to kickboxing along with his brothers Aaron and Jacob, at seventeen years old.

== Kickboxing career ==
=== Amateur career ===
Varga began competing as an amateur in 2006 at the age of twenty and, after amassing an 8–0 record by 2008, spent three months training in Thailand at Eminent Air, Fairtex, Por Pramuk and Sinbi Muay Thai.

Upon his return to Canada, he was given the chance to fight for his first title and he outpointed Carlos Garcia to take the ISKA Amateur North American Light Welterweight (-64.5 kg/142.2 lb) Oriental Championship. He then stopped Chuck Mady with body shots in the first round for the ISKA Amateur Canadian Super Lightweight (-62.3 kg/137.2 lb) Oriental title on August 15, 2008.

Now a national and continental belt holder, Varga faced Joe Concha in an ISKA super lightweight amateur world title match in his hometown of Victoria on January 24, 2009. He scored a knockdown in the fifth and final round and won by decision. He made the first defence of this title against Emil Salva on April 4, 2009, in Langford, British Columbia. After being dropped with a right overhand late in round one, Varga was able to rally back to win by a third round technical knockout that sent the Romanian through the ropes at the end of round three. On June 12, 2009, he made his final title defence with a wide points victory over Matt Embree in Victoria, British Columbia.

Following this, Varga moved back up in weight to challenge for the ISKA amateur light welterweight world title against Devon Henry in Victoria on July 20, 2009. He won by split decision after a back-and-forth fight. In his final bout as an amateur, he took a unanimous decision over Nathan Smandych on October 3, 2009, in Victoria to defend his ISKA light welterweight strap and bring his record to 15–0.

=== Professional career ===
==== WKN and WKF titles ====
Having fought mostly under Oriental rules during his amateur career, Varga ventured into the Muay Thai ruleset after turning professional and spent the early part of his career fighting abroad. In his pro debut on December 12, 2009, he travelled to Flushing, New York, United States and defeated local fighter Omar Ahmed by unanimous decision. He followed this up with another unanimous decision win over Justin Greskiewicz on February 19, 2010 before being invited to compete in an eight-man tournament held in New York on July 17, 2010. Despite entering as the tournament favourite, he was eliminated at the quarter-final stage when he lost to Terrence Hill via a controversial unanimous decision. The Varga camp attempted to have the result overturned and filed a complaint with the WKA a week later. Their bid was rejected, however, as it had been submitted too late. A rematch with Greskiewicz was set for December 3, 2010, at The Warriors Cup XIII in Lincroft, New Jersey, US but fell through when Justin was injured in a motorcycle accident. He was nominated for the 2010 "North American Fighter of the Year" award by Muay Thai Authority but lost out to Kevin Ross.

He returned to the ring on January 8, 2011, at a Canada vs. China event in Jinan, China where he won by unanimous decision under sanshou rules. With this, he earned himself a shot at the World Kickboxing Network (WKN) World Lightweight (-64.4 kg/142 lb) Oriental Championship. Fighting in Victoria for the first time as a professional on March 12, 2011, he heavily utilized knees and sweeps over five rounds to take the unanimous decision and come away with the belt. His rematch with Justin Greskiwicz was rescheduled for Battle at Bally's 2 in Atlantic City, New Jersey, US on August 11, 2011, but fell through again. Instead he took a second consecutive title match in which Varga knocked out Roy Tan in the third round to take the World Kickboxing Federation (WKF) World Light Welterweight (-64.5 kg/142 lb) K-1 belt in Vienna, Austria, on September 24, 2011.

==== Glory Kickboxing ====
After a year out of the ring, he signed with K-1 and made his promotional debut at the K-1 World Grand Prix 2012 in Los Angeles in California on September 8, 2012, against Lerdsila Chumpairtour. Varga dropped the three-time Rajadamnern Stadium champion with a spinning backfist in the opening round but it was ruled a slip by the referee. Nonetheless, he kept a high tempo and fought aggressively en route to winning by unanimous decision.

He was recruited into Glory's 65 kg/143 lb class in 2013 and was amongst the division's eight elite fighters at the Glory 8: Tokyo - 2013 65kg Slam tournament in Tokyo, Japan on May 3, 2013. He dominated Abdellah Ezbiri en route to a unanimous decision win in the quarter-finals, but lost to the eventual champion Yuta Kubo by the same margin in the semis.

Varga was set to face Shane Oblonsky at Glory 11: Chicago - Heavyweight World Championship Tournament in Hoffman Estates, Illinois, US on October 12, 2013. However, Oblonsky withdrew due to injury and was replaced by Jose Palacios. Varga defeated Palacios via unanimous decision.

He was then set to make a defence of his WKN title for the first time against Jessy Petit-Jean in Belgium on November 9, 2013, but the bout was cancelled for undisclosed reasons.

Varga won the 2014 Glory Featherweight Contendership Tournament at Glory 17: Los Angeles in Inglewood, California, US on June 21, 2014, defeating Yodkhunpon Sitmonchai in the semi-finals and Shane Oblonsky in the final, both via unanimous decision.

On April 3, 2015, Varga defeated #1 ranked Mosab Amrani to become the inaugural GLORY Featherweight World Champion. The title fight took place on Glory 20 in Dubai. The decision win was unanimous with the 3 judges scoring 50–46, 48–47, and 49–46. He was scheduled to make his first title defense against Serhiy Adamchuk at Glory 25: Milan. Adamchuk won the fight by unanimous decision, handing Varga his first loss in over two years.

Two months later, Varga fought Liu Wei at the Hero Legends event in Hainan, China, for the Hero Legends Featherweight title. Varga won the fight by unanimous decision. He then challenged for the Glory featherweight title, in a rematch with Serhiy Adamchuk. Varga won the fight by majority decision. He was scheduled to defend his title three months later, at Glory 34: Denver, against Robin van Roosmalen. Van Roosmalen won the fight by fourth-round TKO.

==== Bellator Kickboxing ====
Varga subsequently left Glory, and signed with Bellator Kickboxing. He made his promotional debut at Bellator Kickboxing 6: Budapest against Gabor Gorbics, losing the fight by split decision. Varga would rebound from this loss with a decision win against Lu Yichen at Hero Legends and a second-round TKO of Roberto Gheorghita at Bellator Kickboxing 8: Florence. Two months later, Varga fought Tie Yinghua, losing by unanimous decision.

On July 14, 2018, in Rome, Italy Varga won his 6th professional world title. He defeated Kevin Ross by 1st-round TKO to win the Bellator Kickboxing Featherweight World Title. He defended his title against Shan Cangelosi at Bellator Kickboxing 11. He defeated Cangelosi by knockout in the first round. Varga defended his title for the second time against Cristian Faustino at Bellator Kickboxing 12, winning by unanimous decision.

On March 19, 2021, Varga was released by Bellator as he had fulfilled his contract and Bellator would no longer be featuring Kickboxing events. Varga still held the Bellator World Kickboxing title.

==== Karate Combat ====
On December 22, 2021, it was announced that Varga had signed an exclusive contract with Karate Combat and will debut in the Lightweight division in the 2022 season.

== Mixed martial arts career ==
In 2019, Varga made the transition to mixed martial arts competition for Bellator. He made his debut against Jamese Taylor at Bellator 224 on July 12, 2019. He won the fight via TKO in the second round.

In his second fight, Varga faced Teejay Britton on February 21, 2020, at Bellator 239. He lost the bout via split decision.

== Championships and awards ==
=== Kickboxing ===
- Bellator Kickboxing
  - Bellator Kickboxing Featherweight (-65 kg/143.3 lb) Champion
- Hero Legends
  - Hero Legends 2016 Featherweight (-65 kg/143.3 lb) Champion
- Glory
  - Glory Featherweight Champion (two times; first)
  - 2015, 2016 Glory Featherweight (-65 kg/143.3 lb) Champion
  - 2014 Glory Featherweight (-65 kg/143.3 lb) Contender Tournament Winner
- International Sport Karate Association
  - ISKA Amateur Canadian Super Lightweight (-62.3 kg/137.2 lb) Oriental Championship
  - ISKA Amateur North American Light Welterweight (-64.5 kg/142.2 lb) Oriental Championship
  - ISKA Amateur World Super Lightweight (-62.3 kg/137.2 lb) Oriental Championship
  - ISKA Amateur World Light Welterweight (-64.5 kg/142.2 lb) Oriental Championship
- World Kickboxing Association
  - WKA Amateur British Columbia Light Welterweight (-64 kg/141.1 lb) Championship
- World Kickboxing Federation
  - WKF World Light Welterweight (-64.5 kg/142 lb) K-1 Championship
- World Kickboxing Network
  - WKN World Lightweight (-64.4 kg/142 lb) Oriental Championship

== Karate Combat record ==
Professional record breakdown
5 matches	3 wins	1 loss
By knockout	2	0
By decision	1	1
No contests	1	

Res.	Record	Opponent	Method	Event	Date	Round	Time	Location	Notes
Win	3–1 (1)	Andres Madera	TKO (retirement)	Karate Combat 51	December 19, 2024	3	1:31	Miami, Florida, United States	
NC	2–1 (1)	Andres Madera	NC (accidental eye poke)	Karate Combat 46	May 30, 2024	3	3:00	Austin, Texas, United States	
Loss	2–1	Edgars Skrivers	Decision (split)	Karate Combat 40	June 24, 2023	3	3:00	Miami, Florida, United States	
Win	2–0	Tommy Azouz	TKO (punches)	Karate Combat 37	December 17, 2022	3	2:02	Orlando, Florida, United States	
Win	1–0	Bruno Assis	Decision (unanimous)	Karate Combat Season 4: Episode 4	June 25, 2022	3	3:00	Orlando, Florida, United States	

== Kickboxing record ==
Kickboxing Record
18 Wins (4 (T) KO's, 14 decisions), 6 Losses
Date	Result	Opponent	Event	Location	Method	Round	Time	Record
2019-10-12	Win	(Italy) Cristian Faustino	Bellator Kickboxing 12	Milan, Italy	Decision (Unanimous)	5	3:00	18-6
Defends the Bellator Kickboxing Featherweight Championship.
2018-12-01	Win	(Italy) Shan Cangelosi	Bellator Kickboxing 11	Genoa, Italy	KO (Punch)	1	2:42	17-6
Defends the Bellator Kickboxing Featherweight Championship.
2018-07-14	Win	(United States) Kevin Ross	Bellator Kickboxing 10 : Rome	Rome, Italy	TKO (Ref. Stoppage/Punches)	1	2:08	16-6
Wins the Bellator Kickboxing Featherweight Championship.
2018-02-03	Loss	(China) Tie Yinghua	Glory of Heroes: Chengdu	Chengdu, China	Decision (Unanimous)	3	3:00	15-6
2017-12-09	Win	(Romania) Roberto Gheorghiță	Bellator Kickboxing 8: Florence	Florence, Italy	TKO (Ref. Stoppage)	2	2:49	15-5
2017-06-25	Win	(China) Lu Yichen	Hero Legends	Shenzhen, China	Decision (unanimous)	3	3:00	14-5
2017-04-14	Loss	(Hungary) Gábor Görbics	Bellator Kickboxing 6: Budapest	Budapest, Hungary	Decision (Split)	3	3:00	13-5
2016-10-21	Loss	(Netherlands) Robin van Roosmalen	Glory 34: Denver	Broomfield, Colorado	TKO (corner stoppage)	4	3:00	13-4
Loses the Glory Featherweight Championship.
2016-07-22	Win	(Ukraine) Serhiy Adamchuk	Glory 32: Virginia	Norfolk, Virginia	Decision (majority)	5	3:00	13-3
Wins the Glory Featherweight Championship.
2016-01-16	Win	(China) Liu Wei	Hero Legends	Hainan, China	Decision(unanimous)	3	3:00	12-3
Wins the Hero Legends Featherweight Championship.
2015-11-06	Loss	(Ukraine) Serhiy Adamchuk	Glory 25: Milan	Monza, Italy	Decision (Unanimous)	5	3:00	11-3
Losses the Glory Featherweight Championship.
2015-04-03	Win	(Morocco) Mosab Amrani	Glory 20: Dubai	Dubai, UAE	Decision (unanimous)	5	3:00	11-2
Wins the Glory Featherweight Championship.
2014-06-21	Win	(United States) Shane Oblonsky	Glory 17: Los Angeles - Featherweight Contender Tournament, Final	Inglewood, California, US	Decision (unanimous)	3	3:00	10-2
Wins the Glory Featherweight Contender Tournament.
2014-06-21	Win	(Thailand) Yodkhunpon Sitmonchai	Glory 17: Los Angeles - Featherweight Contender Tournament, Semi Finals	Inglewood, California, US	Decision (unanimous)	3	3:00	9-2
2013-10-12	Win	(Nicaragua) Jose Palacios	Glory 11: Chicago	Hoffman Estates, Illinois, US	Decision (unanimous)	3	3:00	8-2
2013-05-03	Loss	(Japan) Yuta Kubo	Glory 8: Tokyo - 65 kg Slam Tournament, Semi Finals	Tokyo, Japan	Decision (unanimous)	3	3:00	7-2
2013-05-03	Win	(France) Abdellah Ezbiri	Glory 8: Tokyo - 65 kg Slam Tournament, Quarter Finals	Tokyo, Japan	Decision (unanimous)	3	3:00	7-1
2012-09-08	Win	(Thailand) Lerdsila Chumpairtour	K-1 World Grand Prix 2012 in Los Angeles	Los Angeles, California, US	Decision (unanimous)	3	3:00	6-1
2011-09-24	Win	(Netherlands) Roy Tan	Fight for a Dream	Vienna, Austria	KO	3		5-1
Wins the WKF World Light Welterweight (-64.5 kg/142 lb) K-1 Championship.
2011-03-12	Win	(France) Yohan Ha Van	Quest for the Title	Victoria, British Columbia, Canada	Decision (unanimous)	5	3:00	4-1
Wins the WKN World Lightweight (-64.4 kg/142 lb) Oriental Championship.
2011-01-08	Win	(China) Xiao Jie	Canada vs. China	Jinan, China	Decision (unanimous)	5	3:00	3-1
2010-07-17	Loss	(United States) Terrence Hill	Take-On Productions, Quarter Finals	New York City, New York, US	Decision (unanimous)	3	3:00	2-1
2010-02-19	Win	(United States) Justin Greskiewicz	Friday Night Fights	New York City, New York, US	Decision (unanimous)	5	3:00	2-0
2009-12-12	Win	(United States) Omar Ahmed	The New York Showdown II	New York City, New York, US	Decision (unanimous)	5	3:00	1-0
Legend: Win Loss Draw/No contest Notes

== Amateur kickboxing record ==
Amateur kickboxing record
15 Wins (7 (T) KO's, 8 decisions), 0 Losses
Date	Result	Opponent	Event	Location	Method	Round	Time
2009-10-03	Win	(Canada) Nathan Smandych	Quest for the Title IV	Victoria, British Columbia, Canada	Decision (unanimous)	5	2:00
Retains the ISKA Amateur World Light Welterweight (-64.5 kg/142.2 lb) Oriental Championship.
2009-07-20	Win	(Trinidad and Tobago) Devon Henry	Quest for the Title III	Victoria, British Columbia, Canada	Decision (split)	5	2:00
Wins the ISKA Amateur World Light Welterweight (-64.5 kg/142.2 lb) Oriental Championship.
2009-06-12	Win	(Canada) Matt Embree	Summer Slugfest III	Vancouver, British Columbia, Canada	Decision	5	2:00
Retains the ISKA Amateur World Super Lightweight (-62.3 kg/137.2 lb) Oriental Championship.
2009-04-04	Win	(Romania) Emil Salva	Quest for the Title II	Langford, British Columbia, Canada	TKO (punches)	3	2:00
Retains the ISKA Amateur World Super Lightweight (-62.3 kg/137.2 lb) Oriental Championship.
2009-01-24	Win	(Australia) Joe Concha	Quest for the Title I	Victoria, British Columbia, Canada	Decision	5	2:00
Wins the ISKA Amateur World Super Lightweight (-62.3 kg/137.2 lb) Oriental Championship.
2008-08-15	Win	(Canada) Chuck Mady	Summer Slugfest	Victoria, British Columbia, Canada	KO (body punches)	1	
Wins the ISKA Amateur Canadian Super Lightweight (-62.3 kg/137.2 lb) Oriental Championship.
2008-00-00	Win	(United States) Carlos Garcia			Decision	4	2:00
Wins the ISKA Amateur North American Light Welterweight (-64.5 kg/142.2 lb) Oriental Championship.
2006-04-15	Win	(Canada) Ronnie Alampour	Battle at the Bear	Victoria, British Columbia, Canada	KO (punches)	1	
Legend: Win Loss Draw/No contest Notes

== Mixed martial arts record ==
Professional record breakdown
2 matches	1 win	1 loss
By knockout	1	0
By decision	0	1

Res.	Record	Opponent	Method	Event	Date	Round	Time	Location	Notes
Loss	1–1	Teejay Britton	Decision (split)	Bellator 239	February 21, 2020	3	5:00	Thackerville, Oklahoma, United States	
Win	1–0	Jamese Taylor	TKO (punches)	Bellator 224	July 12, 2019	2	3:23	Thackerville, Oklahoma, United States	

== See also ==
- List of male kickboxers
