= Shane Oblonsky =

American kickboxer

- Born: 28 December 1985 (age 40); Irvine, California, United States
- Nationality: American
- Height: 1.83 m (6 ft 0 in)
- Weight: 65 kg (143 lb; 10 st 3 lb)
- Division: Featherweight
- Style: Kickboxing
- Fighting out of: Irvine, California, United States
- Team: Team Oyama
- Trainer: Colin Oyama
- Years active: 2008 - 2017

Kickboxing record
- Total: 17
- Wins: 12
- By knockout: 2
- Losses: 5
- By knockout: 2

Other information
- Boxing record from BoxRec

Shane Oblonsky (born 28 December 1985) is an American featherweight Muay Thai kickboxer, who formerly competed for Glory.

Combat Press ranked him as a top ten featherweight kickboxer in the world between September 2014 and May 2015.

== Kickboxing career ==
Oblonsky made his debut against Yamato Miura at WCK Muaythai on September 4, 2008. He won the fight by decision. He fought two more times in the United States, losing by knockout to Scotty Leffler and beating Hoshung Dizay by decision.

He afterwards had two fights with Wu Lin Feng. On May 1, 2010, he lost to Yang Zhuo by decision. His second fight with WLF was in Las Vegas, at Wu Lin Feng Las Vegas Spectacular, being scheduled to fight Xu Yan. He beat Yan by decision. In between these two fights, Oblonsky scored a third-round knockout of Joey Pagliuso at WCK Muaythai.

In his next two fights, he beat Zhou Zhipeng and Jose Palacios, as short-notice replacement for Kit Cope. Oblonsky had his last muay thai fight before transitioning to kickboxing at Lion Fight 14, when he was scheduled to fight Malaipet Sasiprapa. He beat Sasiprapa by decision.

In 2014, Oblonsky signed with GLORY, and was scheduled to make his debut in the featherweight Contender Tournament, being scheduled to fight Miguel Torres. Torres later withdrew, and was replaced by Marcus Vinicius. Oblonsky beat Vinicius by decision, and advanced to the finals, where he in turn lost a decision to Gabriel Varga.

After losing to Varga in the tournament finals, Oblonsky participated in the Wu Lin Feng eight-man tournament, held on January 31, 2015. He lost his quarterfinal bout to Tie Yinghua by unanimous decision.

He fought twice more with GLORY, winning a decision against Thomas Adamandopoulos, and losing by technical knockout to Maykol Yurk.

== Fight record ==
Professional kickboxing record
12 wins (2 (T)KOs), 5 losses, 0 draws, 0 no contests
Date	Result	Opponent	Event	Location	Method	Round	Time
2017-10-07	Win	(United States) TJ Arcangel	Muay Thai California 4	Ladera Ranch, California, United States	Decision (split)	5	3:00
2015-12-04	Loss	(Brazil) Maykol Yurk	Glory 26: Amsterdam	Amsterdam, Netherlands	TKO	2	
2015-06-05	Win	(France) Thomas Adamandopoulos	Glory 22: Lille	Lille, France	Decision (unanimous)	3	3:00
2015-01-31	Loss	(China) Tie Yinghua	2015 WLF World Championship, Quarter Final	Chongqing, China	Decision (unanimous)	3	3:00
2014-06-21	Loss	(Canada) Gabriel Varga	Glory 17: Los Angeles, Tournament Final	Inglewood, California, United States	Decision (unanimous)	3	3:00
2014-06-21	Win	(Brazil) Marcus Vinicius	Glory 17: Los Angeles, Tournament Semifinal	Inglewood, California, United States	Decision (unanimous)	3	3:00
2014-03-28	Win	(Thailand) Malaipet Sasiprapa	Lion Fight 14	Las Vegas, United States	Decision (unanimous)	5	3:00
2012-02-25	Win	(United States) Jose Palacios	Battle in the Desert 5	Las Vegas, United States	Decision (unanimous)	5	3:00
2012-01-01	Loss	(China) Zhou Zhipeng	Wu Lin Feng World Championship 2015	Changsha, China	Decision (unanimous)	3	3:00
For the WCK Muay Thai Intercontinental Championship.
2011-10-22	Win	(China) Zhou Zhipeng	WCK Muaythai	Las Vegas, United States	Decision (unanimous)	5	3:00
2010-11-13	Win	(China) Xu Yan	Wu Lin Feng Las Vegas Spectacular	Las Vegas, United States	Decision (unanimous)	3	3:00
2010-10-05	Win	(United States) Anthony McDavit	WBC Muay Thai	Las Vegas, United States	KO	2	0:47
2010-05-29	Win	(United States) Joey Pagliuso	WCK Muay Thai	Las Vegas, United States	KO	3	0:36
2010-05-01	win	(China) Yang Zhuo	Wu Lin Feng	China	Decision (unanimous)	3	3:00
2009-12-05	Win	(United States) Hoshung Dizay	World Championship Muay Thai	Primm, Nevada, United States	Decision (unanimous)	5	3:00
2009-07-25	Loss	(United States) Scotty Leffler	WCK Muaythai	Las Vegas, United States	KO	1	
2008-09-04	Win	(Japan) Yamato Miura	World Championship Muaythai	Highland, California, United States	Decision (unanimous)	5	3:00
Legend: Win Loss Draw/no contest Notes

== See also ==
- List of male kickboxers
