= Baxter Humby =

Canadian mixed martial artist

- Born: October 26, 1972 (age 53); Gillam, Manitoba, Canada
- Other names: The One Armed Bandit
- Height: 6 ft 0 in (1.83 m)
- Weight: 155 lb (70 kg; 11.1 st)
- Fighting out of: Winnipeg, Manitoba, Canada
- Years active: 1996-2012 (kickboxing) 2004-present (acting)

Kickboxing record
- Total: 82
- Wins: 70
- Losses: 11
- Draws: 1

Baxter Humby (born October 26, 1972) is a former Canadian kickboxer and stuntman known as "The One Armed Bandit" due to his missing right hand, which was amputated at birth just below his elbow after becoming entangled with the umbilical cord. In 2012, he was nominated for an ESPY Award for Best Male Athlete with a Disability.

== Early life ==
Humby was born on October 26, 1972, in Gillam, Manitoba, Canada. Humby's father (who died when he was eight), was a boxer in the Canadian army, and taught him how to box at age four. He began training in Tae Kwan Do at the age of 17.

== Career ==
=== Kickboxing ===
Humby won the Canadian Super Welterweight Kickboxing Championship in 1996. He then moved to California to pursue a professional kickboxing career and went on to win several titles including the International Muay Thai Council World Super Welterweight Championship, WBC Super Welterweight National Championship, IKKC USA Kickboxing Championship, IMTC World Middleweight Championship and IKBA International Kickboxing Championship.

=== Films ===
In 2004, Humby travelled to China to star in the film "One Arm Hero". It was produced by martial arts film star Carter Wong (Big Trouble in Little China) and directed by Li Man Sing.

Baxter Humby worked as a stunt double for Tobey Maguire in the film Spider-Man 3, during a fight scene in which Spider-Man punches through Sandman's chest.

Humby played the role of Eduardo Romero, a corrupt Mexican official, on the television series The Shield.

He was featured in the music video of the song "Renegades" by X Ambassadors.

In 2020, Humby was a zombie on Fear the Walking Dead. He also worked as a stuntman in the film Army of the Dead starring former professional wrestler Dave Bautista.

== Kickboxing record ==
Kickboxing record
70 wins, 11 losses, 1 draw
Date	Result	Opponent	Event	Location	Method	Round	Time
2011-09-02	Win	(Croatia) Zidov Dominik	Muaythai Premier League: Round 1	Long Beach, California, USA	KO (spinning back kick)	1	1:40
Wins the WMC Intercontinental Junior Middleweight (-70 kg) Championship.
2009-08-30	Loss	(China) Xu Yan	WCK World Championship Muay Thai	Las Vegas, Nevada, USA	Decision (split)	3	3:00
2009-07-25	Win	(United States) Chike Lindsay	WCK Muay Thai	Las Vegas, Nevada, USA	Decision (split)	5	3:00
2007-09-08	Loss	(France) Mickaël Piscitello	WBC Muay Thai Presents: World Championship Muay Thai	Gardena, CA	TKO (Referee Stoppage)	3	
For W.B.C. Muay Thai United States Super Welterweight title.
2004-09-11	Win	(Canada) Alessandro Ricci		Las Vegas, Nevada, USA	Decision (unanimous)	5	3:00
2002-06-01	Loss	(Australia) John Wayne Parr	World Championship Kickboxing	Bernalillo, New Mexico, United States	TKO	3	
2001-06-30	Win	(United States) David Blocker	Draka	Las Vegas, Nevada, USA	KO	1	0:56
Legend: Win Loss Draw/No contest Notes
