= Kevin Ross (kickboxer) =

American Muay Thai fighter

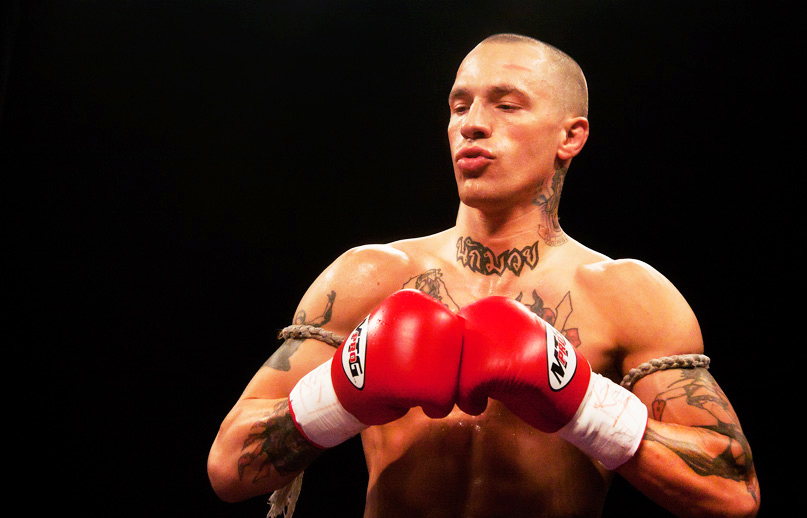
- Born: Kevin Michael Ross; July 27, 1980 (age 46); Reading, Pennsylvania, US
- Other names: The Soul Assassin
- Height: 5 ft 10 in (1.78 m)
- Weight: 145 lb (66 kg; 10.4 st)
- Division: Featherweight
- Reach: 72 in (180 cm)
- Style: Muay Thai
- Fighting out of: Dublin, California, US
- Team: Throwdown Training Cente & CSA Gym
- Years active: 17 (2003–present)

Kickboxing record
- Total: 59
- Wins: 45
- By knockout: 14
- Losses: 14
- Draws: 0

Other information
- Website: thesoulassassin.com
- Boxing record from BoxRec
- Mixed martial arts record from Sherdog
- Last updated on: July 4, 2014

Kevin Ross (born July 27, 1980) is an American retired Muay Thai fighter and kickboxer. He is also a former Bellator Kickboxing Featherweight champion. Among Ross' achievements are the Super light weight (140 pounds) WBC International championship Title, the Welterweight (147 pounds) WBC USA National championship Title, the FIDAM Welterweight championship of Mexico and the United States Muay Thai Federation Welterweight champion. He trained at Combat Sports Academy in Dublin, California.

== Biography and career ==
Ross was born in Reading, Pennsylvania. Moving to Las Vegas in 1994, he started training in Muay Thai in 2003 under Muay Thai trainer Thohsaphol Sitiwatjana (aka Master Toddy). Ross trained in Thailand numerous times, most recently with Sitmonchai gym in Thamaka, Thailand, while fighting in the 2010 Toyota Cup 8-man tournament. In December 2010 Ross was Voted Muay Thai North American Fighter of the year. He has fought some of the best Thai boxers in the world with his losses coming to Kongla, Saenchai, and Sitisak, and his wins to Coke and Malaipet. On October 23, 2011, he fought former Lumpinee Stadium world champion Sagetdao Petpayathai losing by decision.

Ross managed to hold numerous international, US WBC Muay Thai titles in the late 2000s and early 2010s.

In December 2012, Ross signed with the Glory promotion.

Returning from a torn anterior cruciate ligament, he beat Chris Kwiatkowski by unanimous decision at Lion Fight 8 on January 25, 2013, in Las Vegas. Ross defeated UK champion Bernie Mendieta via split decision at Lion Fight 9 in Las Vegas on March 15, 2013. He was expected in the eight-man, 65 kg tournament at Glory 8: Tokyo - 65kg Slam in Tokyo, Japan on May 3, 2013 but pulled out due to contractual obligations to Lion Fight.

Ross lost to Matt Embree by unanimous decision at Lion Fight 10 in Las Vegas on July 26, 2013. He lost to Tetsuya Yamato by split decision at Lion Fight 11 in Las Vegas on September 20, 2013. He fought Matt Embree for the second time at Lion Fight 13 in Las Vegas on February 7, 2014, and continued his trend of having never lost a rematch by taking a split decision. Ross beat Chris Mauceri via TKO (cut) in round three at Lion Fight 15 in Ledyard, Connecticut on May 23, 2014. He defeated Michael Thompson via unanimous decision for the inaugural Lion Fight Super Lightweight Championship at Lion Fight 16 in Las Vegas on July 4, 2014.

In late 2014 Ross got ranked #10 in the world at featherweight.

In 2017, Ross won the Bellator kickboxing featherweight title against Domenico Lomurno and lost it in 2018 against Gabriel Varga.

Ross announced his retirement from competition, following a loss to Asa Ten Pow at TRIUMPHANT 11.

== Notable fights ==
- Unanimous win Over former Rajadamnern Stadium Champion Malaipet “The Diamond” Sasiprapa.
- KO of former WBC International Super Lightweight Champion Kang En, August 30, 2009, winning the WBC Super-Lightweight Title.
- TKO victory of Justin Greskiewicz, July 22, 2009, to take the WBC USA Welterweight title.
- Unanimous win over Chike Lindsay-Adjuda December 5, 2009, Defending WBC USA Welterweight title.
- Unanimous decision win over Phanuwat "Coke" Chunhawat to earn the USMF National Pro Muaythai title Saturday October 10, 2009
- On October 23, 2011, he lost against Sagetdao Petpayathai in the Muay Thai World Super Lightweight title fight, in Los Angeles, California

== Personal life ==
In March 2026, Ross stated that he had married mixed martial artist Gina Carano in August 2022, a marriage the couple had not previously disclosed.

== Titles ==
- Bellator Kickboxing
  - Bellator Kickboxing Featherweight Championship (One time)
- WBC Muaythai
  - 2009 WBC Muaythai USA 66.7 kg Welterweight Championship. (1 defence)
  - 2009 WBC Muaythai International 63.5 kg Super Lightweight Championship. (1 defence)
- Federación Internacional de Artes Marciales
  - 2008 FIDAM International Welterweight Championship.
- United States Muaythai Federation
  - 2009 USMF Pro. National Welterweight Championship.
- Lion Fight
  - 2014 Lion Fight Super Lightweight Championship.
- World Muaythai Council
  - 2015 WMC Intercontinental 63.5 kg Junior Welterweight Championship

== Kickboxing record ==
Kickboxing record
45 Wins (14 (T)KO's, 30 decisions), 15 Losses
Date	Result	Opponent	Event	Location	Method	Round	Time
2021-06-12	Loss	(United States) Asa Ten Pow	TRIUMPHANT 11	Miami, USA	TKO (Doctor Stoppage)	3	
2019-10-12	Loss	(Italy) Shan Cangelosi	Bellator Kickboxing 12	Milan, Italy	Decision (Unanimous)	3	3:00
2018-07-14	Loss	(Canada) Gabriel Varga	Bellator Kickboxing 10 : Rome	Rome, Italy	TKO (Ref. Stoppage/Punches)	1	2:08
Loses the Bellator Kickboxing Featherweight Championship.
2017-12-9	Loss	(Italy) Hamza Imane	Bellator Kickboxing 8	Florence, Italy	Decision (split)	3	3:00
2017-09-23	Win	(Italy) Domenico Lomurno	Bellator Kickboxing 7	San Jose, California	Decision (split)	5	3:00
Wins the Bellator Kickboxing Featherweight Championship.
2016-12-10	Win	(Italy) Alessio Arduini	Bellator Kickboxing 4	Florence, Italy	KO (head kick)	2	0:42
2016-06-24	Win	(United States) Justin Houghton	Bellator Kickboxing 2	St. Louis, MO	Decision (unanimous)	3	3:00
2016-04-15	Win	(Italy) Matteo Taccini	Bellator Kickboxing 1	Torino, Italy	Decision (unanimous)	3	3:00
2015-07-31	Loss	(Thailand) Rungrat Sasiprapa	Lion Fight 23	Temecula, CA	TKO (knee)	2	2:13
2015-03-27	Loss	(Japan) Tetsuya Yamato	Lion Fight 21	Temecula, CA	TKO (Elbows)	1	2:43
Loses Lion Fight Super Lightweight Championship.
2014-11-30	No Contest	(Japan) Michihiro Omigawa	SHOOT BOXING WORLD TOURNAMENT S-cup 2014, Quarter Final	Tokyo, Japan	Doctor Stoppage	2	
2014-07-04	Win	(Australia) Michael Thompson	Lion Fight 16	Las Vegas, Nevada, US	Decision (unanimous)	5	3:00
Wins Lion Fight Super Lightweight Championship.
2014-05-23	Win	(United States) Chris Mauceri	Lion Fight 15	Mashantucket, Connecticut, US	TKO (cut)	3	0:21
2014-02-07	Win	(Canada) Matt Embree	Lion Fight 13	Las Vegas, NV	Decision (split)	5	3:00
2013-09-20	Loss	(Japan) Tetsuya Yamato	Lion Fight 11	Las Vegas, NV	Decision (split)	5	3:00
2013-07-26	Loss	(Canada) Matt Embree	Lion Fight 10	Las Vegas, NV	Decision (unanimous)	5	3:00
2013-03-15	Win	(England) Bernie Mendieta	Lion Fight 9	Las Vegas, NV	Decision (split)	5	3:00
2013-01-25	Win	(United States) Chris Kwiatkowski	Lion Fight 8	Las Vegas, NV	Decision (unanimous)	6	3:00
2011-10-21	loss	(Thailand) Sagetdao Petpayathai	M1 Grand Muay Thai, Nokia Theatre	Los Angeles, CA	TKO Cut Stoppage	3	3:00
2011-08-13	loss	(Thailand) Saenchai Sinbimuaythai	World Class Championship Muay Thai, Anaheim Convention Center	Anaheim, CA	Decision	5	3.00
2011-05-14	Win	(United States) Mark DeLuca	Battle in the Desert II, Buffalo Bills Casino	Las Vegas, NV, US	TKO (Doctor stoppage/cut)	2	3:00
Retains W.B.C. International Super Lightweight title (140 lbs).
2011-02-12	Loss	(Thailand) Sittisak Por Sirichai	Battle in the Desert, Buffalo Bills Casino	Las Vegas, NV, US	Decision (Split)	5	3:00
2010-12-05	Win	(Thailand) Malaipet	King's Birthday Celebration, Commerce Casino	Los Angeles, CA	Decision (Unanimous)	5	3:00
2010-07-02	Loss	(Iran) Masoud Izzadi	Toyota Cup 2010 Tournament, semi final	Nakhon Pathom, Thailand	Decision	3	3:00
2010-07-02	Win	(France)	Toyota Cup 2010 Tournament, quarter final	Nakhon Pathom, Thailand	Decision	3	3:00
2009-12-05	Win	(United States) Chike Lindsay	WCK World Championship Muay Thai, Buffalo Bills Casino	Primm, NV	Decision (Unanimous)	5	3:00
Retains W.B.C. Muaythai USA Welterweight title.
2009-10-10	Win	(Thailand) Coke Chunhawat	War of the Heroes IV	Santa Clara, CA	Decision (Unanimous)	5	3:00
Wins USMF Pro National Welterweight title.
2009-08-30	Win	(China) Kang En	WCK World Championship Muay Thai, Las Vegas Hilton	Las Vegas, NV	TKO	4	1:03
Wins W.B.C. Muaythai International Super-lightweight title.
2009-07-25	Win	(United States) Justin Greskiewicz	WCK World Championship Muay Thai, Las Vegas Hilton	Las Vegas, NV	TKO (High kick)	3	1:49
Wins W.B.C. Muaythai USA Welterweight title.
2009-01-18	Loss	(China) Kang En	Hero Legends	Beijing, China	Decision (Unanimous)	3	3:00
2008-08-29	Win	(Mexico) Rodolfo Arce	Gladiatores Extremos, Lydo's Showcenter	Zapopan, Jalisco, Mexico	Decision (Unanimous)	5	3:00
Retains FIDAM Muaythai International Welterweight title.
2008-07-19	Win	(United States) Freddie Medrano	WCK: Full Rules Muay Thai, Pechanga Resort Casino	Temecula, CA	Decision (Split)	4	3:00
2008-05-31	Win	(United States) Travis Garlits	Xtreme Fighting Association II	Las Vegas, NV	Decision (Unanimous)	3	3:00
2008-03-22	Loss	(Canada) Mark Holst	Xtreme Fighting Association	Las Vegas, NV	TKO	1	0:58
2005-03-25	Loss	(United States) Romie Adanza		Las Vegas, Nevada, US	Decision	5	3:00
Legend: Win Loss Draw/No contest Notes

== Mixed martial arts record ==
Professional record breakdown
1 match	0 wins	1 loss
By knockout	0	0
By submission	0	1
By decision	0	0

Res.	Record	Opponent	Method	Event	Date	Round	Time	Location	Notes
Loss	0-1	Angelo Antuna	Submission (Triangle Choke)	Tuff-N-Uff 1	December 9, 2006	1	3:38	Las Vegas, Nevada, United States	

== See also ==
- List of male kickboxers
