= Lion Fight =

American professional Muay Thai promotion firm

Lion Fight Promotions
- Type: Private
- Industry: Muay Thai, Kickboxing, promotion
- Founded: 2010; 16 years ago
- Founder: Scott Kent
- Headquarters: Las Vegas, Nevada, United States
- Key people: Scott Kent (CEO); Scott Zerr; Nathan Corbett; Sean Wheelock; Justin Kwan
- Website: lionfight.com

Lion Fight, also known as Lion Fight Promotions, is an American professional Muay Thai promotion firm based in Las Vegas, Nevada. The company was established in 2010 by Scott Kent, a former casino executive. Lion Fight is currently available on FITE, and was previously partnered with AXS TV and broadcast on CBS Sports Network.

== History ==
Founded in 2010 by owner and CEO Scott Kent, Lion Fight is an active promoter of Muay Thai events. Since the promotion’s inception, it has grown to host events across 7 countries including Italy, Ireland, and Argentina and venues in the US, from the HardRock Casino to the LA Coliseum.

== Notable competitors ==
Notable fighters who have fought at Lion Fight events:

- Cris Cyborg
- Tetsuya Yamato
- Kevin Ross
- John Wayne Parr
- Lerdsila Chumpairtour
- Jo Nattawut
- Rungravee Sasiprapa
- Amy Pirnie
- Regian Eersel
- Simon Marcus
- Artem Levin
- Tiffany van Soest
