= Vaillant Palace =

Coordinates: 44.412145°N 8.879716°E

RDS Stadium (formerly Mazda Palace and Vaillant Palace) is an indoor sporting arena located in Genoa, Italy. The capacity of the arena is 5,500 people. It hosts concerts and indoor sporting events.
