= Brandon Girtz =

American mixed martial artist

- Born: March 6, 1985 (age 41); Forest Lake, Minnesota, United States
- Height: 5 ft 7 in (1.70 m)
- Weight: 155 lb (70 kg; 11.1 st)
- Division: Lightweight; Featherweight
- Reach: 67 in (170 cm)
- Fighting out of: Denver, Colorado, United States
- Team: Genesis Training Center; Grudge Training Center (2014 -2016); Minnesota Martial Arts Academy; Northway Martial Arts
- Trainer: Jake Ramos; Trevor Wittman
- Wrestling: NCAA Division II Wrestling
- Years active: 2008–present

Mixed martial arts record
- Total: 28
- Wins: 18
- By knockout: 3
- By submission: 8
- By decision: 7
- Losses: 10
- By knockout: 3
- By submission: 2
- By decision: 5

Other information
- University: Minnesota State University
- Notable school: Forest Lake Area High School
- Mixed martial arts record from Sherdog

Brandon Girtz (born March 6, 1985) is an American mixed martial artist and bare knuckle boxer. A professional competitor since 2008, Girtz has fought in Bellator and King of the Cage.

== Background ==
Girtz was born and raised in Forest Lake, Minnesota. Girtz competed hockey until his sophomore year of high school, when he began competing in wrestling, having been persuaded by the school's head coach. However, Girtz did not find a wealth of success during his high school career, qualifying for the state tournament only once during his senior year and losing his first match. Girtz then attended Minnesota State University, where he continued wrestling as a walk-on. At Minnesota State, however, Girtz excelled, receiving NCAA Division II All-American honors.

== Mixed martial arts career ==
=== Early career ===
Girtz started his professional career in 2008. He fought mainly for local promotions such as Brutaal Fight Night and Cage Fighting Xtreme.

With a record of eight victories and only two losses against UFC veterans Alvin Robinson and Eric Wisely respectively, Girtz signed with Bellator.

=== Bellator MMA ===
Girtz made his promotional debut against Michel Quinones on November 9, 2012, at Bellator 80. He won via unanimous decision (29-28, 29–28, 29–28).

Girtz was expected to face Treston Thomison on June 19, 2013, at Bellator 96. However, Thomison was replaced by Derek Campos due to undisclosed reasons. He lost via unanimous decision.

Girtz faced Poppies Martinez on October 4, 2013, at Bellator 102. He won via submission due to an armbar early in the first round.

Just two weeks after his last fight, Girtz replaced Cole Williams against Mike Estus on October 18, 2013, at Bellator 104. Once again he won via submission due to an armbar in the first round.

Girtz was expected to rematch Derek Campos in the quarterfinal match of Bellator season ten lightweight tournament on March 21, 2014, at Bellator 113. However, his opponent was changed and he faced Derek Anderson. He lost the fight via knockout due to a knee in the second round.

Girtz faced Benny Madrid at Bellator 126 on September 26, 2014. He won the fight via TKO in the first round.

Girtz faced Melvin Guillard at Bellator 141 on August 28, 2015. Girtz won the fight via split decision.

Girtz finally rematched Derek Campos at Bellator 146 on November 20, 2015. He won the fight via knockout in the first round.

Girtz faced Adam Piccolotti at Bellator 165 on November 19, 2016. He lost the bout by unanimous decision.

Girtz moved up in weight to face Fernando Gonzalez at Bellator 174 on March 3, 2017. He lost via unanimous decision.

Girtz faced Derek Campos in a third fight at Bellator 181 on July 14, 2017. He lost the rubber match by TKO via doctor stoppage at the end of the second round due to cut on Girtz's forehead caused by a Campos knee.

Girtz was supposed to face UFC veteran Jon Tuck at Bellator 227 but Girtz was forced to pull out due to injury.

Girtz next faced Myles Jury at Bellator 239. He lost the fight by unanimous decision.

Girtz faced Henry Corrales at Bellator 250. He lost the fight via split decision.

On April 19, 2021, it was announced that Girtz was released by Bellator.

== Bare knuckle boxing ==
Girtz made his BKFC debut at BKFC 31 on October 15, 2022 against UFC veteran Jake Lindsey. Girtz was defeated from a doctor stoppage due to a cut in the second round.

Girtz returned at BKFC 41 on April 29, 2023 against Christian Torres. Girtz won via first-round TKO.

Girtz fought again at BKFC 67 against UFC veteran Cameron Van Camp on October 25, 2024. Girtz lost a back-and-forth fight via split decision.

== Championships and accomplishments ==
=== Amateur wrestling ===
- National Collegiate Athletic Association
  - NCAA Division II All-American out of Minnesota State University (2007)
  - NCAA Division II 157 lb: 7th place out of Minnesota State University (2007)
- Reno Tournament of Champions
  - College Tournament 157 lb: 5th place out of Minnesota State University (2006)
- MMAJunkie.com
  - 2019 March Fight of the Month vs. Saad Awad

== Mixed martial arts record ==
Professional record breakdown
28 matches	18 wins	10 losses
By knockout	3	3
By submission	8	2
By decision	7	5

Res.	Record	Opponent	Method	Event	Date	Round	Time	Location	Notes
Win	18–10	Luis Palomino	Decision (unanimous)	Gamebred Bareknuckle MMA 12	October 2, 2026	3	5:00	Santo Domingo, Dominican Republic	Gamebred FC Lightweight Grand Prix Quarterfinal.
Win	17–10	John Macapá	Decision (split)	Gamebred Bareknuckle MMA 10	May 1, 2026	3	5:00	Miami, Florida, United States	Return to Lightweight. Gamebred FC Lightweight Grand Prix Round of 16.
Loss	16–10	Henry Corrales	Decision (split)	Bellator 250	October 28, 2020	3	5:00	Uncasville, Connecticut, United States	Featherweight debut.
Loss	16–9	Myles Jury	Decision (unanimous)	Bellator 239	February 21, 2020	3	5:00	Thackerville, Oklahoma, United States	
Win	16–8	Saad Awad	Decision (unanimous)	Bellator 219	March 29, 2019	3	5:00	Temecula, California, United States	
Loss	15–8	Michael Chandler	Technical Submission (arm triangle choke)	Bellator 197	April 13, 2018	1	4:00	St. Charles, Missouri, United States	
Win	15–7	Luka Jelčić	KO (punches)	Bellator 190	December 9, 2017	1	1:57	Florence, Italy	
Loss	14–7	Derek Campos	TKO (doctor stoppage)	Bellator 181	July 14, 2017	2	5:00	Thackerville, Oklahoma, United States	
Loss	14–6	Fernando Gonzalez	Decision (unanimous)	Bellator 174	March 3, 2017	3	5:00	Thackerville, Oklahoma, United States	Catchweight (174 lbs) bout.
Loss	14–5	Adam Piccolotti	Decision (unanimous)	Bellator 165	November 19, 2016	3	5:00	San Jose, California, United States	
Win	14–4	Derek Campos	KO (punches)	Bellator 146	November 20, 2015	1	0:37	Thackerville, Oklahoma, United States	
Win	13–4	Melvin Guillard	Decision (split)	Bellator 141	August 28, 2015	3	5:00	Temecula, California, United States	
Win	12–4	Benny Madrid	TKO (punches)	Bellator 126	September 26, 2014	1	0:57	Phoenix, Arizona, United States	
Loss	11–4	Derek Anderson	KO (knee)	Bellator 113	March 21, 2014	2	0:23	Mulvane, Kansas, United States	
Win	11–3	Mike Estus	Submission (armbar)	Bellator 104	October 18, 2013	1	4:25	Cedar Rapids, Iowa, United States	Catchweight (160 lbs) bout; both fighters missed weight.
Win	10–3	Poppies Martinez	Submission (armbar)	Bellator 102	October 4, 2013	1	1:20	Visalia, California, United States	
Loss	9–3	Derek Campos	Decision (unanimous)	Bellator 96	June 19, 2013	3	5:00	Thackerville, Oklahoma, United States	Catchweight (158 lbs) bout; Campos missed weight.
Win	9–2	Michel Quiñones	Decision (unanimous)	Bellator 80	November 9, 2012	3	5:00	Hollywood, Florida, United States	
Loss	8–2	Eric Wisely	TKO (arm injury)	Driller Promotions / SEG: Downtown Showdown 1	November 26, 2011	2	4:26	Minneapolis, Minnesota, United States	Catchweight (150 lbs) bout.
Win	8–1	Mike Plazola	Submission (rear-naked choke)	Seconds Out / Vivid MMA: Showdown at the Sheraton 3	May 14, 2011	1	0:43	Minneapolis, Minnesota, United States	
Win	7–1	Bobby Ferrier	Submission (keylock)	KOTC: Mainstream	October 29, 2010	2	2:02	Morton, Minnesota, United States	
Win	6–1	Bobby Ferrier	Submission	Fight Fest 3	July 31, 2010	1	2:45	Somerset, Wisconsin, United States	
Loss	5–1	Alvin Robinson	Submission (rear-naked choke)	Cage Fighting Xtreme	May 15, 2010	2	1:37	Red Lake, Minnesota, United States	
Win	5–0	Drew Dober	Decision (unanimous)	VFC 29: The Rising	November 13, 2009	3	5:00	Council Bluffs, Iowa, United States	
Win	4–0	Dan Merth	Decision (unanimous)	Brutaal Fight Night: This Brutaal's For You	November 6, 2008	3	5:00	Maplewood, Minnesota, United States	
Win	3–0	Bruce Johnson	Submission (rear-naked choke)	Brutaal Fight Night	November 6, 2008	1	2:00	Maplewood, Minnesota, United States	
Win	2–0	Robbie Kriesel	Submission (guillotine choke)	Brutaal Fight Night	June 27, 2008	2	0:30	Elko, Minnesota, United States	
Win	1–0	Sam Keigley	Submission (neck crank)	Brutaal Fight Night	April 25, 2008	1	0:38	Shakopee, Minnesota, United States	

== Bare-knuckle boxing record ==
Professional record breakdown
2 matches	1 win	1 loss
By knockout	1	1

Res.	Record	Opponent	Method	Event	Date	Round	Time	Location	Notes
Win	1–1	Christian Torres	KO	BKFC 41	April 29, 2023	1	1:10	Broomfield, Colorado, United States	
Loss	0–1	Jake Lindsey	TKO (doctor stoppage)	BKFC 31	October 15, 2022	2	2:00	Broomfield, Colorado, United States	

== See also ==
- List of male mixed martial artists
