= Bellator 293 =

Bellator mixed martial arts event in 2023

Bellator 293: Golm vs. James
- The poster for Bellator 293: Golm vs. James
- Promotion: Bellator MMA
- Date: March 31, 2023
- Venue: Pechanga Resort and Casino
- City: Temecula, California, United States

Event chronology
Bellator 292: Nurmagomedov vs. Henderson	Bellator 293: Golm vs. James	Bellator 294: Carmouche vs. Bennett 2

Bellator 293: Golm vs. James was a mixed martial arts event produced by Bellator MMA that took place on March 31, 2023, at the Pechanga Resort and Casino in Temecula, California, United States.

== Background ==
The event marked the promotion's 13th visit to Temecula and first since Bellator 229 in October 2019.

The main event of Bellator 293 was a heavyweight match between No. 5-ranked Marcelo Golm and No. 8-ranked Daniel James.

Top-ranked Cat Zingano will face the No. 4-ranked Leah McCourt in the co-main event of the card. The main card will also include a middleweight battle between No. 4-ranked John Salter and No. 6-ranked Aaron Jeffrey and a welterweight matchup between No. 10-ranked Jaleel Willis and Rustam Khabilov, a 13-fight UFC veteran who will be making his Bellator debut.

A lightweight bout between Mandel Nallo and Jay Jay Wilson was scheduled for this event; however Wilson pulled out of the bout and was replaced by Adam Piccolotti.

A welterweight bout between Rustam Khabilov and Jaleel Willis was scheduled for this event. However on the day of weigh-ins, Khabilov pulled out of the bout due to undisclosed reasons.

== Results ==
Main Card (Showtime)
Weight class				Method	Round	Time	Notes
Heavyweight	Daniel James	def.	Marcelo Golm	TKO (punches)	3	0:26
Women's Featherweight	Cat Zingano	def.	Leah McCourt	Decision (unanimous) (29–28, 30–27, 29–28)	3	5:00
Middleweight	John Salter	def.	Aaron Jeffery	Decision (unanimous) (30–27, 30–27, 30–27)	3	5:00
Lightweight	Archie Colgan	def.	Justin Montalvo	TKO (punches)	1	3:33
Light Heavyweight	Luke Trainer	def.	Sullivan Cauley	Submission (rear-naked choke)	1	2:58
Preliminary card (Youtube/Pluto TV)
Heavyweight	Rakim Cleveland	def.	Christian Edwards	Submission (guillotine choke)	3	3:55
Lightweight	Mike Hamel	def.	Nick Browne	TKO (head kick and punches)	1	0:42
Lightweight	Adam Piccolotti	def.	Mandel Nallo	Submission (rear-naked choke)	3	4:26
Women's Featherweight	Sara Collins	def.	Pam Sorenson	Submission (scarf hold armlock)	1	2:43
Welterweight	Jeff Creighton	def.	Joey Davis	Decision (split) (29–28, 28–29, 29–28)	3	5:00
Featherweight	Lucas Brennan	def.	Josh San Diego	Submission (rear-naked choke)	1	2:14
Lightweight	Vladimir Tokov	def.	Lance Gibson Jr.	KO (punches)	1	1:02
Women's Catchweight (120 lb)	Randi Field	def.	Ashley Cummins	Decision (unanimous) (30–27, 29–28, 29–28)	3	5:00
Bantamweight	Bryce Meredith	def.	Brandon Carrillo	Submission (rear-naked choke)	2	3:11
Women's Strawweight	Mackenzie Stiller	def.	Maria Henderson	Submission (armbar)	1	3:17

== Reported payout ==
The following is the reported payout to the fighters as reported to the California State Athletic Commission. The amounts do not include sponsor money, discretionary bonuses, viewership points, or additional earnings.

- Daniel James: $100,000 (includes $5,000 win bonus) def. Marcelo Golm: $50,000
- Cat Zingano: $100,000 (no win bonus) def. Leah McCourt: $40,000
- John Salter: $86,000 (includes $43,000 win bonus) def. Aaron Jeffery: $60,000
- Archie Colgan: $30,000 (no win bonus) def. Justin Montalvo: $10,000
- Luke Trainer: $56,000 (includes $28,000 win bonus) def. Sullivan Cauley: $30,000
- Rakim Cleveland: $40,000 (includes $20,000 win bonus) def. Christian Edwards: $10,000
- Mike Hamel: $38,000 (includes $19,000 win bonus) def. Nick Browne: $24,000
- Adam Piccolotti: $76,000 (includes $38,000 win bonus) def. Mandel Nallo: $35,000
- Sara Collins: $40,000 (includes $20,000 win bonus) def. Pam Sorenson: $21,000
- Jeff Creighton: $20,000 (includes $10,000 win bonus) def. Joey Davis: $60,000
- Lucas Brennan: $20,000 (no win bonus) def. Josh San Diego: $5,000
- Vladimir Tokov: $46,000 (includes $23,000 win bonus) def. Lance Gibson Jr.: $40,000
- Randi Field: $10,000 (includes $5,000 win bonus) def. Ashley Cummins: $3,000
- Bryce Meredith: $30,000 (no win bonus) def. Brandon Carrillo: $2,000
- Mackenzie Stiller: $4,500 (includes $2,000 win bonus) def. Maria Henderson: $10,000

== See also ==
- 2023 in Bellator MMA
- List of Bellator MMA events
- List of current Bellator fighters
