= Bellator 260 =

Bellator mixed martial arts event in 2021

Bellator 260: Lima vs. Amosov
- The poster for Bellator 260: Lima vs. Amosov
- Promotion: Bellator MMA
- Date: June 11, 2021
- Venue: Mohegan Sun Arena
- City: Uncasville, Connecticut, United States

Event chronology
Bellator 259: Cyborg vs. Smith 2	Bellator 260: Lima vs. Amosov	Bellator 261: Johnson vs. Moldavsky

Bellator 260: Lima vs. Amosov was a mixed martial arts event produced by Bellator MMA that took place on June 11, 2021, at Mohegan Sun Arena in Uncasville, Connecticut. The event was the first Bellator event with fans in attendance since Bellator 240 in February 2020 due to the COVID-19 pandemic.

== Background ==
The event was headlined by a Bellator Welterweight World Championship between current titleholder Douglas Lima and undefeated Yaroslav Amosov. It was the first event in 15 months that will have live fans in the audience. A 175 lb catchweight bout between #8 Paul Daley and #3 Jason Jackson was the co-main event.

A featherweight bout between #6 ranked Aaron Pico and Aiden Lee took place on the main card of the event.

A welterweight bout between Demarques Jackson and Mark Lemminger was announced as the main card opener.

A featherweight bout between Tywan Claxton and Justin Gonzales, as well as a lightweight bout between Nick Newell and Bobby King took place in the preliminary portion of the card. A featherweight bout between Lucas Brennan and Matt Skibicki were likewise on the preliminary portion of the card.

A welterweight bout between Kyle Crutchmer and Levan Chokheli, as well as a middleweight bout between Taylor Johnson and Lance Wright took place at the event. The Johnson and Wright bout was moved a week before the event to Bellator 261.

A women's featherweight bout between Marina Mokhnatkina and Amanda Bell also took place on the event's preliminary card.

A 128 lb catchweight bout between Vanessa Porto and Ilara Joanne was announced for the event. However, after weigh-ins, Porto was deemed unfit to compete by the commission and the bout was scrapped.

The former LFA Light-Heavyweight champion Alex Polizzi and Gustavo Trujillo competed in the sole light-heavyweight fight of the card.

== Results ==
Main Card (Showtime)
Weight class				Method	Round	Time	Notes
Welterweight	Yaroslav Amosov	def.	Douglas Lima (c)	Decision (unanimous) (50–45, 49–46, 49–46)	5	5:00	(Note: For the Bellator Welterweight World Championship.)
Catchweight (175 lb)	Jason Jackson	def.	Paul Daley	Decision (unanimous) (30–27, 30–27, 30–27)	3	5:00
Featherweight	Aaron Pico	def.	Aiden Lee	Submission (anaconda choke)	3	1:33
Welterweight	Mark Lemminger	def.	Demarques Jackson	TKO (punches)	2	3:30
Preliminary card (Youtube/Pluto TV)
Welterweight	Kyle Crutchmer	def.	Levan Chokheli	Decision (unanimous) (30–27, 30–27, 30–27)	3	5:00
Featherweight	Justin Gonzales	def.	Tywan Claxton	Decision (split) (29–28, 28–29, 29–28)	3	5:00
Lightweight	Bobby King	def.	Nick Newell	Decision (split) (30–27, 28–29, 30–27)	3	5:00
Catchweight (150 lb)	Lucas Brennan	def.	Matt Skibicki	Submission (anaconda choke)	1	1:54
Women's Featherweight	Marina Mokhnatkina	def.	Amanda Bell	Decision (unanimous) (30–27, 30–27, 30–27)	3	5:00
Light Heavyweight	Alex Polizzi	def.	Gustavo Trujillo	Submission (straight armbar)	1	4:22

== See also ==
- 2021 in Bellator MMA
- List of Bellator MMA events
- List of current Bellator fighters
