= Derek Anderson (fighter) =

American mixed martial arts fighter

- Born: February 20, 1990 (age 36); San Diego, California, United States
- Other names: The Barbaric
- Height: 6 ft 0 in (1.83 m)
- Weight: 170 lb (77 kg; 12 st)
- Division: Welterweight; Lightweight
- Reach: 74 in (188 cm)
- Team: Team Xplode MMA
- Years active: 2011–present

Mixed martial arts record
- Total: 21
- Wins: 17
- By knockout: 6
- By submission: 6
- By decision: 5
- Losses: 4
- By knockout: 1
- By submission: 1
- By decision: 2

Other information
- Mixed martial arts record from Sherdog

Derek Anderson (born February 20, 1990) is an American mixed martial artist competing in the Welterweight division. He is most notable for his time with Bellator MMA,

== Mixed martial arts career ==
=== Early career ===
Anderson began training in mixed martial arts at the age of 19, and later made his professional mixed martial arts debut in 2011. Anderson compiled an undefeated record of 9-0 with one no contest before being signed by Bellator.

=== Bellator MMA ===
Anderson made his promotional debut against Patricky Freire at Bellator 98 on September 7, 2013. Anderson won via unanimous decision.

Anderson was then scheduled to face Terry Etim in the quarterfinals of the Bellator Season Ten Lightweight Tournament on March 21, 2014 at Bellator 113. Etim then pulled out due to an ACL injury. Etim was replaced by Brandon Girtz. Anderson won via knockout due to a knee strike in the second round.

In the semifinals, Anderson faced Polish submission specialist Marcin Held at Bellator 117 on April 18, 2014. Anderson was handed his first professional loss via triangle choke submission in the second round.

Anderson faced Danny Navarro on January 16, 2015 at Bellator 132. He won the fight via TKO in the third round.

Anderson next faced Brent Primus at Bellator 141 on August 28, 2015. He lost the fight by split decision.

In the first rematch of his career, Anderson faced Patricky Freire for a second time on December 4, 2015 at Bellator 147. He again won the fight, this time by split decision.

A welterweight bout between Anderson and Paul Daley at Bellator 163 was scrapped on the day of the event after Daley fell ill from effects of his weight cut.

Anderson faced Saad Awad at Bellator 160 on August 26, 2016. In a back-and-forth affair, in which both fighters traded near submission finishes, Anderson ultimately won the fight via unanimous decision.

Anderson faced Derek Campos at Bellator 170 on January 21, 2017. He lost the fight via unanimous decision.

Anderson was expected to face Michael Page at Bellator 179 on May 19, 2017 but Page suffered a knee injury and neck injury. No replacement opponent was sought.

Anderson was expected to return against Adam Piccolotti at Bellator 189 on December 1, 2017. However, an injury to Anderson forced him out of the bout and he was replaced by David Rickels.

Anderson made his welterweight debut against Guilherme Bomba on October 4, 2019 at Bellator 229. He won via unanimous decision.

Anderson was expected to headline Bellator London 2 against Michael Page on 23 November 2019 but Anderson withdrew for undisclosed reasons on 12 November 2019.

Anderson was then scheduled again to face Paul Daley at Bellator 247 on October 1, 2020. However, Daley was not unable to make weight and was hospitalized, leading to the bout being scrapped.

Anderson faced Killys Mota on November 5 at Bellator 251. He won the bout via second round knockout.

Anderson faced Michael Page at Bellator 258 on May 7, 2021. Anderson was supposed to fight Page twice before at Bellator 179 and Bellator London 2. Towards the end of the first round, Page landed a kick to Anderson's face which badly broke his nose to the point it was completely flattened, leading to the doctor stopping the fight between rounds.

He was suspended 120 days (4 months) by the Mohegan Sun Department of Athletic Regulation for falsifying his pre-fight medical forms after Anderson failed to disclose that he went to the hospital four times for kidney failure during his fight camp.

Anderson was scheduled to face Goiti Yamauchi on March 12, 2022 at Bellator 276. The week of the event, the bout was scrapped for unknown reasons.

Anderson was scheduled to face former two-time Glory Welterweight Champion Cédric Doumbé at Bellator Champions Series 2 on May 17, 2024. However, he was involved in a hit-and-run accident that severely injured his left foot and withdrew from the bout.

== Mixed martial arts record ==
Professional record breakdown
21 matches	17 wins	4 losses
By knockout	6	1
By submission	6	1
By decision	5	2

Res.	Record	Opponent	Method	Event	Date	Round	Time	Location	Notes
Loss	17–4 (1)	Michael Page	TKO (doctor stoppage)	Bellator 258	May 7, 2021	1	5:00	Uncasville, Connecticut, United States	Catchweight (175 lb) bout.
Win	17–3 (1)	Killys Mota	KO (head kick)	Bellator 251	November 5, 2020	2	4:27	Uncasville, Connecticut, United States	
Win	16–3 (1)	Guilherme Vasconcelos	Decision (unanimous)	Bellator 229	October 4, 2019	3	5:00	Temecula, California, United States	Welterweight debut.
Win	15–3 (1)	Zak Bucia	Decision (unanimous)	Bellator 197	April 13, 2018	3	5:00	St. Charles, Missouri, United States	Catchweight (165 lbs) bout.
Loss	14–3 (1)	Derek Campos	Decision (unanimous)	Bellator 170	January 21, 2017	3	5:00	Inglewood, California, United States	
Win	14–2 (1)	Saad Awad	Decision (unanimous)	Bellator 160	August 26, 2016	3	5:00	Anaheim, California, United States	
Win	13–2 (1)	Patricky Pitbull	Decision (split)	Bellator 147	December 4, 2015	3	5:00	San Jose, California, United States	
Loss	12–2 (1)	Brent Primus	Decision (split)	Bellator 141	August 28, 2015	3	5:00	Temecula, California, United States	
Win	12–1 (1)	Danny Navarro	TKO (punches)	Bellator 132	January 16, 2015	3	3:51	Temecula, California, United States	
Loss	11–1 (1)	Marcin Held	Submission (triangle choke)	Bellator 117	April 18, 2014	2	3:09	Council Bluffs, Iowa, United States	Bellator Season Ten Lightweight Tournament Semifinal.
Win	11–0 (1)	Brandon Girtz	KO (knee)	Bellator 113	March 21, 2014	2	0:23	Mulvane, Kansas, United States	Bellator Season Ten Lightweight Tournament Quarterfinal.
Win	10–0 (1)	Patricky Pitbull	Decision (unanimous)	Bellator 98	September 7, 2013	3	5:00	Uncasville, Connecticut, United States	
Win	9–0 (1)	Craig Flynn	TKO (punches)	Xplode Fight Series: Aftermath	July 20, 2013	1	0:48	San Pasqual Indian Reservation, California United States	
Win	8–0 (1)	Ray Carter	Submission (armbar)	Xplode Fight Series: Revancha	March 16, 2013	2	1:02	San Pasqual Indian Reservation, California, United States	
NC	7–0 (1)	Aaron Neveu	No Contest (overturned)	Xplode Fight Series: Damage	November 17, 2012	1	2:06	San Pasqual Indian Reservation, California, United States	Overturned due to unintentional headbutt.
Win	7–0	Edward Darby	Submission (armbar)	Xplode Fight Series: Anarchy	September 22, 2012	1	1:06	San Pasqual Indian Reservation, California, United States	
Win	6–0	Kris Armbrister	Submission (guillotine choke)	Xplode Fight Series: Eclipse	July 28, 2012	1	2:56	San Pasqual Indian Reservation, California, United States	
Win	5–0	Dino Valdez	Submission (guillotine choke)	Xplode Fight Series: Disarm	March 24, 2012	1	0:26	San Pasqual Indian Reservation, California, United States	
Win	4–0	Jeremy Michur	TKO (knee)	Xplode Fight Series: Brutal Conduct	January 21, 2012	1	1:40	San Pasqual Indian Reservation, California, United States	
Win	3–0	Chris Mercado	TKO (punches)	Gladiator Challenge: Season's Beatings 3	December 4, 2011	2	N/A	San Jacinto, California, United States	
Win	2–0	Dominique Chisem	Submission (guillotine choke)	Xplode Fight Series: Hillside Havoc	November 19, 2011	1	N/A	San Pasqual Indian Reservation, California, United States	
Win	1–0	Leo Franklin	Submission (rear-naked choke)	Xplode Fight Series: Rumble off the Reservation	August 6, 2011	3	2:42	San Pasqual Indian Reservation, California, United States	

== See also ==
- List of male mixed martial artists
