= Lucas Brennan =

American mixed martial arts fighter

- Born: June 3, 2000 (age 26); Irvine, California, United States
- Other names: Skywalker
- Height: 5 ft 10 in (1.78 m)
- Weight: 145 lb (66 kg; 10 st 5 lb)
- Division: Featherweight
- Reach: 71 in (180 cm)
- Fighting out of: Frisco, Texas
- Team: Next Generation MMA World HQ
- Rank: Black belt in Brazilian Jiu-Jitsu
- Years active: 2019–present

Mixed martial arts record
- Total: 13
- Wins: 10
- By knockout: 2
- By submission: 7
- By decision: 1
- Losses: 3
- By decision: 3

Other information
- Notable relatives: Chris Brennan (father)
- Mixed martial arts record from Sherdog

Lucas Brennan (born June 3, 2000) is an American mixed martial artist and jiujitsu practitioner. He is a five-time finalist in the Brazilian-Jiu-Jitsu world championships and a two-time world champion. He was formerly with Bellator MMA, where he had his first 10 professional bouts. Brennan is signed with the UFC and is scheduled to make his debut against Francis Marshall in a lightweight bout on April 25, 2026

== Early life and education ==
Brennan was born in Irvine, California, in 2000, his family moved to Aubrey, Texas, later in 2006 where he was raised in North Texas. In 2011, Brennan began training in BJJ in middle school. He is the son of American mixed martial artist Chris Brennan.

Brennan graduated Cum Laude from Frisco High School, class of 2018. He was formerly enrolled at the University of North Texas (UNT) in the College of Visual Arts and Design, before leaving to give full commitment to his already ongoing mixed martial arts (MMA) career. Prompted by his signing at age 19 with Bellator prior to his sophomore year.

== Mixed martial arts career ==
=== Amateur career ===
Brennan made his amateur MMA debut on August 12, 2017. Brennan won his debut amateur bout in XKO with a third-round rear-naked choke against Christopher Williams, two months after turning 17 years old and prior to his senior year in high school.

After winning his debut amateur MMA appearance, his next fight would not be until May 2018, which he won via a unanimous decision against Diara Culpepper in the Legacy Fighting Alliance (LFA). Brennan signed to LFA as their first-ever contracted amateur athlete at the time, but LFA would soon shift ownership, and Brennan returned to being a free agent.

His final amateur fight was under the Tuff-N-Uff banner on June 7, 2019, winning a unanimous decision over Isaac Villegas in Las Vegas, Nevada.

=== Professional career ===
Brennan's professional debut was made in Bellator MMA in the featherweight weight class at Bellator 224 in July 2019. Brennan won in the first round with a rear-naked choke submission against Thomas Lopez.

In November 2019, he fought Jacob Landin and acquired another win at Bellator 233 with a first-round rear-naked choke submission.

A scheduled bout with Jamese Taylor was canceled on the day of the event in February 2020 due to complications in Taylor's weight cut and supposed health. Later that same year at Bellator 244 in August, Brennan face Will Smith and win with a TKO in the second round.

In November 2020, Brennan fought Andrew Salas and won via unanimous decision at Bellator 252. Brennan missed weight for this bout, coming in at 148 pounds, two pounds over the featherweight non-title limit. The bout continued at a catchweight and Brennan was fined a portion of his purse which went to Salas.

Fighting only once in 2021 due to COVID-19 complications at Bellator 260, Brennan faced Matthew Skibicki and won via a first-round anaconda choke submission.

In January 2022, Brennan defeated Benjamin Lugo at Bellator 273 with his self-appointed assassin choke in the first round. This was a first in Bellator's history and the first submission of 2022.

Brennan was scheduled to face Nick Talavera on November 18, 2022 at Bellator 288. However, Talavera pulled out due to unknown reason the week of the event and the bout was scrapped. He was briefly linked to Bellator 289 against Dre Miley, but Miley was not cleared by the Illonois commission to compete.

Brennan faced Josh San Diego on March 31, 2023 at Bellator 293. He won the fight by a rear-naked choke submission in the first round.

Brennan faced Weber Almeida on August 11, 2023 at Bellator 298. He won the fight via knockout knee in the third round.

Brennan debuted with the Professional Fighters League (PFL) at PFL 1 on April 4, 2024 and lost his bout against Dimitre Ivy by unanimous decision.

On April 22, 2024, it was announced that Brennan had parted ways with the promotion.

=== Ultimate Fighting Championship ===
On April 20, 2026, it was reported that Brennan signed with the UFC and made his debut against Francis Marshall in a lightweight bout on April 25, 2026, at UFC Fight Night 274. He lost the fight by unanimous decision.

Returning to the featherweight division, Brennan was scheduled to face Austin Bashi on November 7, 2026 at UFC Fight Night 293. However, Brennan had to withdraw due to a full-thickness tear of his ACL and was replaced by promotional newcomer Carlos Calderon on four days' notice.

== Mixed martial arts record ==
Professional record breakdown
14 matches	11 wins	3 losses
By knockout	2	0
By submission	8	0
By decision	1	3

Res.	Record	Opponent	Method	Event	Date	Round	Time	Location	Notes
Loss	11–3	Francis Marshall	Decision (unanimous)	UFC Fight Night: Sterling vs. Zalal	April 25, 2026	3	5:00	Las Vegas, Nevada, United States	Lightweight debut.
Win	11–2	Joshua Weems	Submission (rear-naked choke)	Xtreme Knockout 71	October 10, 2025	1	4:40	Arlington, Texas, United States	
Win	10–2	Austin Coleman	Submission (rear-naked choke)	Xtreme Knockout 70	May 23, 2025	1	1:48	Arlington, Texas, United States	
Loss	9–2	Mauricio Gomez	Decision (split)	Fury FC 99	December 15, 2024	3	5:00	Houston, Texas, United States	
Loss	9–1	Dimitre Ivy	Decision (unanimous)	PFL 1 (2024)	April 4, 2024	3	5:00	San Antonio, Texas, United States	
Win	9–0	Weber Almeida	KO (knee)	Bellator 298	August 11, 2023	3	3:32	Sioux Falls, South Dakota, United States	
Win	8–0	Josh San Diego	Submission (rear-naked choke)	Bellator 293	March 31, 2023	1	2:14	Temecula, California, United States	
Win	7–0	Johnny Soto	Submission (neck crank)	Bellator 282	June 24, 2022	1	3:34	Uncasville, Connecticut, United States	
Win	6–0	Ben Lugo	Submission (assassin choke)	Bellator 273	January 29, 2022	1	2:27	Phoenix, Arizona, United States	
Win	5–0	Matthew Skibicki	Submission (anaconda choke)	Bellator 260	June 11, 2021	1	1:54	Uncasville, Connecticut, United States	Catchweight (150 lb) bout.
Win	4–0	Andrew Salas	Decision (unanimous)	Bellator 252	November 12, 2020	3	5:00	Uncasville, Connecticut, United States	Catchweight (148 lb) bout; Brennan missed weight.
Win	3–0	Will Smith	TKO (punches)	Bellator 244	August 21, 2020	2	4:14	Uncasville, Connecticut, United States	
Win	2–0	Jacob Landin	Submission (forearm choke)	Bellator 233	November 8, 2019	1	3:36	Thackerville, Oklahoma, United States	
Win	1–0	Thomas Lopez	Submission (rear-naked choke)	Bellator 224	July 12, 2019	1	3:02	Thackerville, Oklahoma, United States	Featherweight debut.

== See also ==
- List of current UFC fighters
- List of male mixed martial artists
