= Bellator 273 =

Bellator mixed martial arts event in 2022

Bellator 273: Bader vs. Moldavsky
- The poster for Bellator 273: Bader vs. Moldavsky
- Promotion: Bellator MMA
- Date: January 29, 2022
- Venue: Footprint Center
- City: Phoenix, Arizona, United States

Event chronology
Bellator 272: Pettis vs. Horiguchi	Bellator 273: Bader vs. Moldavsky	Bellator 274: Gracie vs. Storley

Bellator 273: Bader vs. Moldavsky was a mixed martial arts event produced by Bellator MMA, it took place on January 29, 2022 at the Footprint Center in Phoenix, Arizona.

== Background ==
A winner in eight of his last 11 bouts, Bader will be making his return to the heavyweight division for the first time since 2019, Bader’s last title defense came against the Cheick Kongo at Bellator 226, a bout Bader was controlling until an accidental eye poke prematurely ended the contest. Since then, Bader lost his 205-pound title against Vadim Nemkov before entering the light heavyweight grand prix where he defeated Lyoto Machida in April before suffering a KO loss to Corey Anderson in October at Bellator 268. Moldavsky, a protege of Fedor Emelianenko, became Bellator’s first-ever interim heavyweight champion with a unanimous decision win over Timothy Johnson at Bellator 261.

A middleweight bout between Romero Cotton and Dalton Rosta was scheduled for this event. However, two weeks before the event Cotton pulled out of the bout due to illness and was replaced by Duane Johnson.

A featherweight bout between Weber Almeida and Josh Wright was scheduled for this event, however it was scrapped for unknown reasons. Fabricio Franco was instead booked against Weber. At weigh ins, Franco came in 151.2 lb - 5.2 pounds over the featherweight weight limit, leading to the bout being scrapped.

== Results ==
Main Card (Showtime)
Weight class				Method	Round	Time	Notes
Heavyweight	Ryan Bader (c)	def.	Valentin Moldavsky (ic)	Decision (unanimous) (48–47, 48–47, 48–47)	5	5:00	(Note: For the Bellator Heavyweight World Championship.)
Lightweight	Benson Henderson	def.	Islam Mamedov	Decision (split) (29–28, 28–29, 29–28)	3	5:00
Featherweight	Henry Corrales	def.	Aiden Lee	Technical Decision (unanimous) (29–28, 30–27, 30–27)	3	0:41	(Note: Fight ended in the third round after an accidental eyepoke.)
Welterweight	Sabah Homasi	def.	Jaleel Willis	Submission (arm-triangle choke)	1	1:42
Preliminary card (Youtube/Pluto TV)
Bantamweight	Enrique Barzola	def.	Darrion Caldwell	TKO (elbows and punches)	3	3:01
Lightweight	Chris Gonzalez	def.	Saad Awad	KO (head kick and punches)	1	0:36
Middleweight	Dalton Rosta	def.	Duane Johnson	Decision (unanimous) (30–27, 30–27, 30–27)	3	5:00
Bantamweight	Nikita Mikhailov	def.	Blaine Shutt	TKO (punches)	3	3:23
Featherweight	Lucas Brennan	def.	Ben Lugo	Submission (arm-triangle choke)	1	2:27
Light Heavyweight	Sullivan Cauley	def.	Ben Parrish	TKO (punches)	1	4:35

== See also ==
- 2022 in Bellator MMA
- List of Bellator MMA events
- List of current Bellator fighters
