= List of Bellator MMA events =

This is a list of events held and scheduled by Bellator MMA (formerly known as "Bellator Fighting Championships"), a mixed martial arts organization based in the United States. The first event, Bellator 1, took place on April 3, 2009.

== Events ==
| # | Event | Date | Venue | Location | Attendance |
|---|---|---|---|---|---|
| — | Bellator Champions Series Japan (Cancelled) | December 31, 2024 | Saitama Super Arena | Saitama, Japan | |
| — | Bellator Champions Series Paris (Cancelled) | November 16, 2024 | Adidas Arena | Paris, France | |
| — | Bellator Champions Series Chicago (Cancelled) | October 12, 2024 | Wintrust Arena | Chicago, Illinois, U.S. | |
| 313 | Bellator Champions Series 5 | September 14, 2024 | OVO Arena Wembley | London, England | |
| 312 | Bellator Champions Series 4 | September 7, 2024 | Pechanga Arena | San Diego, California, U.S. | |
| 311 | Bellator Champions Series 3 | June 22, 2024 | 3Arena | Dublin, Ireland | |
| 310 | Bellator Champions Series 2 | May 17, 2024 | Accor Arena | Paris, France | |
| 309 | Bellator Champions Series 1 | March 22, 2024 | SSE Arena | Belfast, Northern Ireland | |
| 308 | PFL vs. Bellator | February 24, 2024 | Kingdom Arena | Riyadh, Saudi Arabia | |
| 307 | Bellator 301 | November 17, 2023 | Wintrust Arena | Chicago, Illinois, U.S. | |
| 306 | Bellator 300 | October 7, 2023 | Pechanga Arena | San Diego, California, U.S. | |
| 305 | Bellator 299 | September 23, 2023 | 3Arena | Dublin, Ireland | |
| 304 | Bellator 298 | August 11, 2023 | Sanford Pentagon | Sioux Falls, South Dakota, U.S. | |
| 303 | Bellator MMA x Rizin 2 | July 30, 2023 | Saitama Super Arena | Saitama, Japan | |
| 302 | Bellator 297 | June 16, 2023 | Wintrust Arena | Chicago, Illinois, U.S. | |
| 301 | Bellator 296 | May 12, 2023 | Accor Arena | Paris, France | |
| 300 | Bellator 295 | April 22, 2023 | Neal S. Blaisdell Arena | Honolulu, Hawaii, U.S. | |
| 299 | Bellator 294 | April 21, 2023 | Neal S. Blaisdell Arena | Honolulu, Hawaii, U.S. | |
| 298 | Bellator 293 | March 31, 2023 | Pechanga Resort and Casino | Temecula, California, U.S. | |
| 297 | Bellator 292 | March 10, 2023 | SAP Center | San Jose, California, U.S. | |
| 296 | Bellator 291 | February 24, 2023 | 3Arena | Dublin, Ireland | |
| 295 | Bellator 290 | February 4, 2023 | Kia Forum | Inglewood, California, U.S. | |
| 294 | Bellator MMA vs. Rizin | December 31, 2022 | Saitama Super Arena | Saitama, Japan | 12,184 |
| 293 | Bellator 289 | December 9, 2022 | Mohegan Sun Arena | Uncasville, Connecticut, U.S. | |
| 292 | Bellator 288 | November 18, 2022 | Wintrust Arena | Chicago, Illinois, U.S. | |
| 291 | Bellator 287 | October 29, 2022 | Allianz Cloud Arena | Milan, Italy | |
| 290 | Bellator 286 | October 1, 2022 | Long Beach Arena | Long Beach, California, U.S. | |
| 289 | Bellator 285 | September 23, 2022 | 3Arena | Dublin, Ireland | |
| 288 | Bellator 284 | August 12, 2022 | Sanford Pentagon | Sioux Falls, South Dakota, U.S. | 2,900 |
| 287 | Bellator 283 | July 22, 2022 | Emerald Queen Casino and Hotel | Tacoma, Washington, U.S. | 1,012 |
| 286 | Bellator 282 | June 24, 2022 | Mohegan Sun Arena | Uncasville, Connecticut, U.S. | 10,000 |
| 285 | Bellator 281 | May 13, 2022 | SSE Arena | London, England | 8,779 |
| 284 | Bellator 280 | May 6, 2022 | AccorHotels Arena | Paris, France | 13,131 |
| 283 | Bellator 279 | April 23, 2022 | Neal S. Blaisdell Arena | Honolulu, Hawaii, U.S. | 6,516 |
| 282 | Bellator 278 | April 22, 2022 | Neal S. Blaisdell Arena | Honolulu, Hawaii, U.S. | 6,516 |
| 281 | Bellator 277 | April 15, 2022 | SAP Center | San Jose, California, U.S. | 13,950 |
| 280 | Bellator 276 | March 12, 2022 | Family Arena | St. Louis, Missouri, U.S. | 7,053 |
| 279 | Bellator 275 | February 25, 2022 | 3Arena | Dublin, Ireland | 8,806 |
| 278 | Bellator 274 | February 19, 2022 | Mohegan Sun Arena | Uncasville, Connecticut, U.S. | 11,454 |
| 277 | Bellator 273 | January 29, 2022 | Footprint Center | Phoenix, Arizona, U.S. | 12.077 |
| 276 | Bellator 272 | December 3, 2021 | Mohegan Sun Arena | Uncasville, Connecticut, U.S. | 7,600 |
| 275 | Bellator 271 | November 12, 2021 | Seminole Hard Rock Hotel & Casino Hollywood | Hollywood, Florida, U.S. | 2,411 |
| 274 | Bellator 270 | November 5, 2021 | 3Arena | Dublin, Ireland | 10.932 |
| 273 | Bellator 269 | October 23, 2021 | VTB Arena | Moscow, Russia | 11,900 |
| 272 | Bellator 268 | October 16, 2021 | Footprint Center | Phoenix, Arizona, U.S. | 9,902 |
| 271 | Bellator 267 | October 1, 2021 | Wembley Arena | London, England | 8,867 |
| 270 | Bellator 266 | September 18, 2021 | SAP Center | San Jose, California, U.S. | 14,147 |
| 269 | Bellator 265 | August 20, 2021 | Sanford Pentagon | Sioux Falls, South Dakota, U.S. | 2,900 |
| 268 | Bellator 264 | August 13, 2021 | Mohegan Sun Arena | Uncasville, Connecticut, U.S. | 10,000 |
| 267 | Bellator 263 | July 31, 2021 | The Forum | Inglewood, California, U.S. | 7,024 |
| 266 | Bellator 262 | July 16, 2021 | Mohegan Sun Arena | Uncasville, Connecticut, U.S. | 12,000 |
| 265 | Bellator 261 | June 25, 2021 | Mohegan Sun Arena | Uncasville, Connecticut, U.S. | 9,112 |
| 264 | Bellator 260 | June 11, 2021 | Mohegan Sun Arena | Uncasville, Connecticut, U.S. | 5,667 |
| 263 | Bellator 259 | May 21, 2021 | Mohegan Sun Arena | Uncasville, Connecticut, U.S. | 0 |
| 262 | Bellator 258 | May 7, 2021 | Mohegan Sun Arena | Uncasville, Connecticut, U.S. | 0 |
| 261 | Bellator 257 | April 16, 2021 | Mohegan Sun Arena | Uncasville, Connecticut, U.S. | 0 |
| 260 | Bellator 256 | April 9, 2021 | Mohegan Sun Arena | Uncasville, Connecticut, U.S. | 0 |
| 259 | Bellator 255 | April 2, 2021 | Mohegan Sun Arena | Uncasville, Connecticut, U.S. | 0 |
| 258 | Bellator 254 | December 10, 2020 | Mohegan Sun Arena | Uncasville, Connecticut, U.S. | 0 |
| 257 | Bellator 253 | November 19, 2020 | Mohegan Sun Arena | Uncasville, Connecticut, U.S. | 0 |
| 256 | Bellator 252 | November 12, 2020 | Mohegan Sun Arena | Uncasville, Connecticut, U.S. | 0 |
| 255 | Bellator 251 | November 5, 2020 | Mohegan Sun Arena | Uncasville, Connecticut, U.S. | 0 |
| 254 | Bellator 250 | October 29, 2020 | Mohegan Sun Arena | Uncasville, Connecticut, U.S. | 0 |
| 253 | Bellator 249 | October 15, 2020 | Mohegan Sun Arena | Uncasville, Connecticut, U.S. | 0 |
| 252 | Bellator Paris/248 | October 10, 2020 | AccorHotels Arena | Paris, France | 1,000 |
| 251 | Bellator Milan 3 | October 3, 2020 | Ex Palalido (Allianz Cloud) | Milan, Italy | 0 |
| — | Bellator Dublin 3 (Cancelled) | October 3, 2020 | 3Arena | Dublin, Ireland | Cancelled |
| 250 | Bellator 247 | October 1, 2020 | Ex Palalido (Allianz Cloud) | Milan, Italy | 0 |
| 249 | Bellator Milan 2 | September 26, 2020 | Ex Palalido (Allianz Cloud) | Milan, Italy | 0 |
| 248 | Bellator 246 | September 12, 2020 | Mohegan Sun Arena | Uncasville, Connecticut, U.S. | 0 |
| 247 | Bellator 245 | September 11, 2020 | Mohegan Sun Arena | Uncasville, Connecticut, U.S. | 0 |
| 246 | Bellator 244 | August 21, 2020 | Mohegan Sun Arena | Uncasville, Connecticut, U.S. | 0 |
| 245 | Bellator 243 | August 7, 2020 | Mohegan Sun Arena | Uncasville, Connecticut, U.S. | 0 |
| 244 | Bellator 242 | July 24, 2020 | Mohegan Sun Arena | Uncasville, Connecticut, U.S. | 0 |
| — | Bellator 244 (Cancelled) | June 6, 2020 | Wintrust Arena | Chicago, Illinois, U.S. | Cancelled |
| — | Bellator 243 (Cancelled) | May 29, 2020 | Pechanga Resort and Casino | Temecula, California, U.S. | Cancelled |
| — | Bellator London 3 (Cancelled) | May 16, 2020 | SSE Arena | London, England | Cancelled |
| — | Bellator 242 (Cancelled) | May 9, 2020 | SAP Center | San Jose, California, U.S. | Cancelled |
| — | Bellator 241 (Cancelled) | March 13, 2020 | Mohegan Sun Arena | Uncasville, Connecticut, U.S. | Cancelled |
| 243 | Bellator Dublin 2/240 | February 22, 2020 | 3Arena | Dublin, Ireland | |
| 242 | Bellator 239 | February 21, 2020 | WinStar World Casino | Thackerville, Oklahoma, U.S. | |
| 241 | Bellator 238 | January 25, 2020 | The Forum | Inglewood, California, U.S. | |
| 240 | Bellator & Rizin: Japan/237 | December 29, 2019 | Saitama Super Arena | Saitama, Japan | |
| 239 | Bellator 236 | December 21, 2019 | Neal S. Blaisdell Arena | Honolulu, Hawaii, U.S. | |
| 238 | Bellator 235 | December 20, 2019 | Neal S. Blaisdell Arena | Honolulu, Hawaii, U.S. | |
| 237 | Bellator London 2 | November 23, 2019 | SSE Arena | London, England | |
| 236 | Bellator 234 | November 14, 2019 | Menora Mivtachim Arena | Tel Aviv, Israel | |
| 235 | Bellator 233 | November 8, 2019 | WinStar World Casino | Thackerville, Oklahoma, U.S. | |
| 234 | Bellator 232 | October 26, 2019 | Mohegan Sun Arena | Uncasville, Connecticut, U.S. | |
| 233 | Bellator 231 | October 25, 2019 | Mohegan Sun Arena | Uncasville, Connecticut, U.S. | |
| 232 | Bellator Milan/230 | October 12, 2019 | Ex Palalido (Allianz Cloud) | Milan, Italy | |
| 231 | Bellator 229 | October 4, 2019 | Pechanga Resort and Casino | Temecula, California, U.S. | |
| 230 | Bellator 228 | September 28, 2019 | The Forum | Inglewood, California, U.S. | |
| 229 | Bellator Dublin/227 | September 27, 2019 | 3Arena | Dublin, Ireland | |
| 228 | Bellator 226 | September 7, 2019 | SAP Center | San Jose, California, U.S. | |
| 227 | Bellator 225 | August 24, 2019 | Webster Bank Arena | Bridgeport, Connecticut, U.S. | |
| 226 | Bellator 224 | July 12, 2019 | WinStar World Casino | Thackerville, Oklahoma, U.S. | |
| 225 | Bellator London/223 | June 22, 2019 | SSE Arena | London, England | |
| 224 | Bellator 222 | June 14, 2019 | Madison Square Garden | New York City, U.S. | |
| 223 | Bellator 221 | May 11, 2019 | Allstate Arena | Rosemont, Illinois, U.S. | |
| 222 | Bellator Birmingham | May 4, 2019 | Resorts World Arena | Birmingham, England | |
| 221 | Bellator 220 | April 27, 2019 | SAP Center | San Jose, California, U.S. | |
| 220 | Bellator 219 | March 29, 2019 | Pechanga Resort and Casino | Temecula, California, U.S. | |
| 219 | Bellator 218 | March 22, 2019 | WinStar World Casino | Thackerville, Oklahoma, U.S. | |
| 218 | Bellator 217 | February 23, 2019 | 3Arena | Dublin, Ireland | |
| 217 | Bellator 216 | February 16, 2019 | Mohegan Sun Arena | Uncasville, Connecticut, U.S. | |
| 216 | Bellator 215 | February 15, 2019 | Mohegan Sun Arena | Uncasville, Connecticut, U.S. | |
| 215 | Bellator Newcastle | February 9, 2019 | Metro Radio Arena | Newcastle upon Tyne, England | |
| 214 | Bellator 214 | January 26, 2019 | The Forum | Inglewood, California, U.S. | |
| 213 | Bellator 213 | December 15, 2018 | Neal S. Blaisdell Arena | Honolulu, Hawaii, U.S. | |
| 212 | Bellator 212 | December 14, 2018 | Neal S. Blaisdell Arena | Honolulu, Hawaii, U.S. | |
| 211 | Bellator 211 | December 1, 2018 | RDS Stadium | Genoa, Italy | |
| 210 | Bellator 210 | November 30, 2018 | WinStar World Casino | Thackerville, Oklahoma, U.S. | |
| 209 | Bellator 209 | November 15, 2018 | Menora Mivtachim Arena | Tel Aviv, Israel | |
| 208 | Bellator 208 | October 13, 2018 | Nassau Coliseum | Uniondale, New York, U.S. | |
| 207 | Bellator 207 | October 12, 2018 | Mohegan Sun Arena | Uncasville, Connecticut, U.S. | |
| 206 | Bellator 206 | September 29, 2018 | SAP Center | San Jose, California, U.S. | |
| 205 | Bellator 205 | September 21, 2018 | CenturyLink Arena | Boise, Idaho, U.S. | |
| 204 | Bellator 204 | August 17, 2018 | Sanford Pentagon | Sioux Falls, South Dakota, U.S. | |
| 203 | Bellator 203 | July 14, 2018 | Foro Italico | Rome, Italy | |
| 202 | Bellator 202 | July 13, 2018 | WinStar World Casino | Thackerville, Oklahoma, U.S. | |
| 201 | Bellator 201 | June 29, 2018 | Pechanga Resort and Casino | Temecula, California, U.S. | |
| 200 | Bellator 200 | May 25, 2018 | The SSE Arena, Wembley | London, England | |
| 199 | Bellator 199 | May 12, 2018 | SAP Center | San Jose, California, U.S. | |
| 198 | Bellator 198 | April 28, 2018 | Allstate Arena | Rosemont, Illinois, U.S. | |
| 197 | Bellator 197 | April 13, 2018 | Family Arena | St. Charles, Missouri, U.S. | |
| 196 | Bellator 196 | April 6, 2018 | BOK Hall | Budapest, Hungary | |
| — | Bellator: Monster Energy Fight Series: Atlanta | March 3, 2018 | Georgia World Congress Center | Atlanta, Georgia, U.S. | —N/a |
| 195 | Bellator 195 | March 2, 2018 | WinStar World Casino | Thackerville, Oklahoma, U.S. | |
| 194 | Bellator 194 | February 16, 2018 | Mohegan Sun Arena | Uncasville, Connecticut, U.S. | |
| 193 | Bellator 193 | January 26, 2018 | Pechanga Resort and Casino | Temecula, California, U.S. | |
| 192 | Bellator 192 | January 20, 2018 | The Forum | Inglewood, California, U.S. | |
| 191 | Bellator 191 | December 15, 2017 | Metro Radio Arena | Newcastle, England, UK | |
| 190 | Bellator 190 | December 9, 2017 | Nelson Mandela Forum | Florence, Italy | |
| 189 | Bellator 189 | December 1, 2017 | WinStar World Casino | Thackerville, Oklahoma, U.S. | |
| — | Bellator: Monster Energy Fight Series: Homestead | November 19, 2017 | Homestead-Miami Speedway | Homestead, Florida, U.S. | —N/a |
| 188 | Bellator 188 | November 16, 2017 | Menora Mivtachim Arena | Tel Aviv, Israel | |
| 187 | Bellator 187 | November 10, 2017 | 3Arena | Dublin, Ireland | |
| 186 | Bellator 186 | November 3, 2017 | Bryce Jordan Center | University Park, Pennsylvania, U.S. | |
| 185 | Bellator 185 | October 20, 2017 | Mohegan Sun Arena | Uncasville, Connecticut, U.S. | 8,346 |
| — | Bellator: Monster Energy Fight Series: Talladega | October 13, 2017 | Talladega Superspeedway | Lincoln, Alabama, U.S. | —N/a |
| 184 | Bellator 184 | October 6, 2017 | WinStar World Casino | Thackerville, Oklahoma, U.S. | 1,247 |
| 183 | Bellator 183 | September 23, 2017 | SAP Center | San Jose, California, U.S. | 5,897 |
| 182 | Bellator 182 | August 25, 2017 | Turning Stone Resort & Casino | Verona, New York, U.S. | 4,390 |
| — | Bellator: Monster Energy Fight Series: Bristol | August 19, 2017 | Bristol Motor Speedway | Bristol, Tennessee, U.S. | —N/a |
| 181 | Bellator 181 | July 14, 2017 | WinStar World Casino | Thackerville, Oklahoma, U.S. | 1,247 |
| 180 | Bellator NYC | June 24, 2017 | Madison Square Garden | New York City, U.S. | 12,133 |
| — | Bellator: Monster Energy Fight Series: Charlotte | May 20, 2017 | Charlotte Motor Speedway | Charlotte, North Carolina, U.S. | —N/a |
| 179 | Bellator 179 | May 19, 2017 | The SSE Arena, Wembley | London, England, UK | 11,872 |
| 178 | Bellator 178 | April 21, 2017 | Mohegan Sun Arena | Uncasville, Connecticut, U.S. | 9,010 |
| 177 | Bellator 177 | April 14, 2017 | Budapest Sports Arena | Budapest, Hungary | 11,439 |
| 176 | Bellator 176 | April 8, 2017 | Pala Alpitour | Torino, Italy | 9,216 |
| 175 | Bellator 175 | March 31, 2017 | Allstate Arena | Rosemont, Illinois, U.S. | 11,807 |
| 174 | Bellator 174 | March 3, 2017 | WinStar World Casino | Thackerville, Oklahoma, U.S. | 1,211 |
| 173 | Bellator 173 | February 24, 2017 | SSE Arena Belfast | Belfast, UK | 10,461 |
| 172 | Bellator 172 | February 18, 2017 | SAP Center | San Jose, California, U.S. | 7,273 |
| 171 | Bellator 171 | January 27, 2017 | Kansas Star Casino | Mulvane, Kansas, U.S. | 3,206 |
| 170 | Bellator 170 | January 21, 2017 | The Forum | Inglewood, California, U.S. | 11,972 |
| 169 | Bellator 169 | December 16, 2016 | 3Arena | Dublin, Ireland | 12,184 |
| 168 | Bellator 168 | December 10, 2016 | Nelson Mandela Forum | Florence, Italy | 8,113 |
| 167 | Bellator 167 | December 3, 2016 | WinStar World Casino | Thackerville, Oklahoma, U.S. | 1,274 |
| 166 | Bellator 166 | December 2, 2016 | WinStar World Casino | Thackerville, Oklahoma, U.S. | 1,350 |
| 165 | Bellator 165 | November 19, 2016 | SAP Center | San Jose, California, U.S. | 13,156 |
| 164 | Bellator 164 | November 10, 2016 | Menora Mivtachim Arena | Tel Aviv, Israel | 8,937 |
| 163 | Bellator 163 | November 4, 2016 | Mohegan Sun Arena | Uncasville, Connecticut, U.S. | 9,156 |
| 162 | Bellator 162 | October 21, 2016 | FedEx Forum | Memphis, Tennessee, U.S. | 9,140 |
| — | Bellator Kickboxing 3 | September 17, 2016 | SYMA Hall | Budapest, Hungary | |
| 161 | Bellator 161 | September 16, 2016 | H-E-B Center at Cedar Park | Cedar Park, Texas, U.S. | 8,632 |
| 160 | Bellator 160 | August 26, 2016 | Honda Center | Anaheim, California, U.S. | 9,139 |
| 159 | Bellator 159 | July 23, 2016 | Kansas Star Arena | Mulvane, Kansas, U.S. | 3,124 |
| 158 | Bellator 158 | July 16, 2016 | O2 Arena | London, England | 12,311 |
| 157 | Bellator 157: Dynamite 2 | June 24, 2016 | Scottrade Center | St.Louis, Missouri, U.S. | 11,982 |
| 156 | Bellator 156 | June 17, 2016 | Save Mart Center | Fresno, California, U.S. | 5,552 |
| 155 | Bellator 155 | May 20, 2016 | CenturyLink Arena | Boise, Idaho, U.S. | 6,120 |
| 154 | Bellator 154 | May 14, 2016 | SAP Center | San Jose, California, U.S. | 11,084 |
| 153 | Bellator 153 | April 22, 2016 | Mohegan Sun Arena | Uncasville, Connecticut, U.S. | 9,043 |
| 152 | Bellator 152 | April 16, 2016 | Pala Alpitour | Torino, Italy | 13,867 |
| 151 | Bellator 151 | March 4, 2016 | WinStar World Casino | Thackerville, Oklahoma, U.S. | 1,152 |
| 150 | Bellator 150 | February 26, 2016 | Kansas Star Casino | Mulvane, Kansas, U.S. | 3,288 |
| 149 | Bellator 149 | February 19, 2016 | Toyota Center | Houston, Texas, U.S. | 14,209 |
| 148 | Bellator 148 | January 29, 2016 | Save Mart Center | Fresno, California, U.S. | 5,425 |
| 147 | Bellator 147 | December 4, 2015 | San Jose State University | San Jose, California, U.S. | 2,076 |
| 146 | Bellator 146 | November 20, 2015 | WinStar World Casino | Thackerville, Oklahoma, U.S. | 1,246 |
| 145 | Bellator 145 | November 6, 2015 | Scottrade Center | St. Louis, Missouri, U.S. | 5,259 |
| 144 | Bellator 144 | October 23, 2015 | Mohegan Sun Arena | Uncasville, Connecticut, U.S. | 6,009 |
| 143 | Bellator 143 | September 25, 2015 | State Farm Arena | Hidalgo, Texas, U.S. | 3,756 |
| 142 | Bellator 142: Dynamite 1 | September 19, 2015 | SAP Center | San Jose, California, U.S. | 11,732 |
| 141 | Bellator 141 | August 28, 2015 | Pechanga Resort & Casino | Temecula, California, U.S. | 1,200 |
| 140 | Bellator 140 | July 17, 2015 | Mohegan Sun Arena | Uncasville, Connecticut, U.S. | 7,610 |
| 139 | Bellator 139 | June 26, 2015 | Kansas Star Casino | Mulvane, Kansas, U.S. | 2,500 |
| 138 | Bellator 138 | June 19, 2015 | Scottrade Center | St. Louis, Missouri, U.S. | 6,724 |
| 137 | Bellator 137 | May 15, 2015 | Pechanga Resort & Casino | Temecula, California, U.S. | 1,200 |
| 136 | Bellator 136 | April 10, 2015 | Bren Events Center | Irvine, California, U.S. | 4,869 |
| 135 | Bellator 135 | March 27, 2015 | WinStar World Casino | Thackerville, Oklahoma, U.S. | 1,345 |
| 134 | Bellator 134: The British Invasion | February 27, 2015 | Mohegan Sun Casino | Uncasville, Connecticut, U.S. | 8,372 |
| 133 | Bellator 133 | February 13, 2015 | Save Mart Center | Fresno, California, U.S. | 5,184 |
| 132 | Bellator 132 | January 16, 2015 | Pechanga Resort & Casino | Temecula, California, U.S. | 1,300 |
| 131 | Bellator 131 | November 15, 2014 | Valley View Casino Center | San Diego, California, U.S. | 8,243 |
| 130 | Bellator 130 | October 24, 2014 | Kansas Star Arena | Mulvane, Kansas, U.S. | 2,700 |
| – | Bellator 2014 Monster Energy Cup | October 18, 2014 | Sam Boyd Stadium | Whitney, Nevada, U.S. | —N/a |
| 129 | Bellator 129 | October 17, 2014 | Mid-America Center | Council Bluffs, Iowa, U.S. | 3,951 |
| 128 | Bellator 128 | October 10, 2014 | Winstar World Casino | Thackerville, Oklahoma, U.S. | 1,325 |
| 127 | Bellator 127 | October 3, 2014 | Pechanga Resort & Casino | Temecula, California, U.S. | 1,200 |
| 126 | Bellator 126 | September 26, 2014 | Grand Canyon University Arena | Phoenix, Arizona, U.S. | 6,300 |
| 125 | Bellator 125 | September 19, 2014 | Save Mart Center | Fresno, California, U.S. | 5,000 |
| 124 | Bellator 124 | September 12, 2014 | Compuware Arena | Plymouth Township, Michigan, U.S. | 2,468 |
| 123 | Bellator 123 | September 5, 2014 | Mohegan Sun Arena | Uncasville, Connecticut, U.S. | 7,109 |
| 122 | Bellator 122 | July 25, 2014 | Pechanga Resort & Casino | Temecula, California, U.S. | 1,150 |
| 121 | Bellator 121 | June 6, 2014 | WinStar World Casino | Thackerville, Oklahoma, U.S. | 1,100 |
| 120 | Bellator 120 | May 17, 2014 | Landers Center | Southaven, Mississippi, U.S. | 8,115 |
| 119 | Bellator 119 | May 9, 2014 | Casino Rama | Rama, Ontario, Canada | |
| 118 | Bellator 118 | May 2, 2014 | Revel Atlantic City | Atlantic City, New Jersey, U.S. | |
| 117 | Bellator 117 | April 18, 2014 | Mid-America Center | Council Bluffs, Iowa, U.S. | |
| 116 | Bellator 116 | April 11, 2014 | Pechanga Resort & Casino | Temecula, California, U.S. | |
| 115 | Bellator 115 | April 4, 2014 | Reno Events Center | Reno, Nevada, U.S. | |
| 114 | Bellator 114 | March 28, 2014 | Maverik Center | West Valley City, Utah, U.S. | |
| 113 | Bellator 113 | March 21, 2014 | Kansas Star Arena | Mulvane, Kansas, U.S. | |
| 112 | Bellator 112 | March 14, 2014 | The Horseshoe | Hammond, Indiana, U.S. | |
| 111 | Bellator 111 | March 7, 2014 | WinStar World Casino | Thackerville, Oklahoma, U.S. | |
| 110 | Bellator 110 | February 28, 2014 | Mohegan Sun Arena | Uncasville, Connecticut, U.S. | |
| 109 | Bellator 109 | November 22, 2013 | Sands Casino Event Center | Bethlehem, Pennsylvania, U.S. | |
| 108 | Bellator 108 | November 15, 2013 | Revel Casino | Atlantic City, New Jersey, U.S. | |
| 107 | Bellator 107 | November 8, 2013 | WinStar World Casino | Thackerville, Oklahoma, U.S. | |
| 106 | Bellator 106 | November 2, 2013 | Convention and Entertainment Center | Long Beach, California, U.S. | 6,596 |
| 105 | Bellator 105 | October 25, 2013 | Santa Ana Star Center | Rio Rancho, New Mexico, U.S. | |
| 104 | Bellator 104 | October 18, 2013 | U.S. Cellular Center | Cedar Rapids, Iowa, U.S. | |
| 103 | Bellator 103 | October 11, 2013 | Kansas Star Arena | Mulvane, Kansas, U.S. | |
| 102 | Bellator 102 | October 4, 2013 | Visalia Convention Center | Visalia, California, U.S. | 1,482 |
| 101 | Bellator 101 | September 27, 2013 | Rose Garden | Portland, Oregon, U.S. | 2,368 |
| 100 | Bellator 100 | September 20, 2013 | Grand Canyon University Arena | Phoenix, Arizona, U.S. | |
| 99 | Bellator 99 | September 13, 2013 | Pechanga Resort & Casino | Temecula, California, U.S. | |
| 98 | Bellator 98 | September 7, 2013 | Mohegan Sun Arena | Uncasville, Connecticut, U.S. | |
| 97 | Bellator 97 | July 31, 2013 | Santa Ana Star Center | Rio Rancho, New Mexico, U.S. | |
| 96 | Bellator 96 | June 19, 2013 | Winstar World Casino | Thackerville, Oklahoma, U.S. | |
| 95 | Bellator 95 | April 4, 2013 | Revel Casino | Atlantic City, New Jersey, U.S. | |
| 94 | Bellator 94 | March 28, 2013 | USF Sun Dome | Tampa, Florida, U.S. | |
| 93 | Bellator 93 | March 21, 2013 | Androscoggin Bank Colisée | Lewiston, Maine, U.S. | |
| 92 | Bellator 92 | March 7, 2013 | Pechanga Resort and Casino | Temecula, California, U.S. | |
| 91 | Bellator 91 | February 28, 2013 | Santa Ana Star Center | Rio Rancho, New Mexico, U.S. | |
| 90 | Bellator 90 | February 21, 2013 | Maverik Center | West Valley City, Utah, U.S. | |
| 89 | Bellator 89 | February 14, 2013 | Bojangles' Coliseum | Charlotte, North Carolina, U.S. | |
| 88 | Bellator 88 | February 7, 2013 | Arena at Gwinnett Center | Duluth, Georgia, U.S. | 4,267 |
| 87 | Bellator 87 | January 31, 2013 | Soaring Eagle Casino | Mount Pleasant, Michigan, U.S. | 850 |
| 86 | Bellator 86 | January 24, 2013 | WinStar World Casino | Thackerville, Oklahoma, U.S. | 1,288 |
| 85 | Bellator 85 | January 17, 2013 | Bren Events Center | Irvine, California, U.S. | 3,002 |
| 84 | Bellator 84 | December 14, 2012 | Horseshoe Casino | Hammond, Indiana, U.S. | |
| 83 | Bellator 83 | December 7, 2012 | Caesars Atlantic City | Atlantic City, New Jersey, U.S. | |
| 82 | Bellator 82 | November 30, 2012 | Soaring Eagle Casino | Mount Pleasant, Michigan, U.S. | |
| 81 | Bellator 81 | November 16, 2012 | Ryan Center | Kingston, Rhode Island, U.S. | |
| 80 | Bellator 80 | November 9, 2012 | Seminole Hard Rock Hotel & Casino Hollywood | Hollywood, Florida, U.S. | |
| 79 | Bellator 79 | November 2, 2012 | Casino Rama | Rama, Ontario, Canada | |
| 78 | Bellator 78 | October 26, 2012 | Nutter Center | Dayton, Ohio, U.S. | |
| 77 | Bellator 77 | October 19, 2012 | Reading Eagle Theater | Reading, Pennsylvania, U.S. | |
| 76 | Bellator 76 | October 12, 2012 | Caesars Windsor | Windsor, Ontario, Canada | |
| 75 | Bellator 75 | October 5, 2012 | Horseshoe Casino | Hammond, Indiana, U.S. | |
| 74 | Bellator 74 | September 28, 2012 | Caesars Atlantic City | Atlantic City, New Jersey, U.S. | |
| 73 | Bellator 73 | August 24, 2012 | Harrah's Tunica Hotel and Casino | Tunica, Mississippi, U.S. | |
| 72 | Bellator 72 | July 20, 2012 | USF Sun Dome | Tampa, Florida, U.S. | |
| 71 | Bellator 71 | June 22, 2012 | Mountaineer Casino, Racetrack and Resort | Chester, West Virginia, U.S. | |
| 70 | Bellator 70 | May 25, 2012 | New Orleans Convention Center | New Orleans, Louisiana, U.S. | |
| 69 | Bellator 69 | May 18, 2012 | L'Auberge du Lac Resort | Lake Charles, Louisiana, U.S. | |
| 68 | Bellator 68 | May 11, 2012 | Caesars Atlantic City | Atlantic City, New Jersey, U.S. | |
| 67 | Bellator 67 | May 4, 2012 | Casino Rama | Rama, Ontario, Canada | |
| 66 | Bellator 66 | April 20, 2012 | I-X Center | Cleveland, Ohio, U.S. | |
| 65 | Bellator 65 | April 13, 2012 | Boardwalk Hall | Atlantic City, New Jersey, U.S. | |
| 64 | Bellator 64 | April 6, 2012 | Caesars Windsor | Windsor, Ontario, Canada | |
| 63 | Bellator 63 | March 30, 2012 | Mohegan Sun Arena | Uncasville, Connecticut, U.S. | |
| 62 | Bellator 62 | March 23, 2012 | Laredo Energy Arena | Laredo, Texas, U.S. | |
| 61 | Bellator 61 | March 16, 2012 | Horseshoe Riverdome | Bossier City, Louisiana, U.S. | |
| 60 | Bellator 60 | March 9, 2012 | Horseshoe Casino | Hammond, Indiana, U.S. | |
| 59 | Bellator 59 | November 26, 2011 | Caesars Atlantic City | Atlantic City, New Jersey, U.S. | |
| 58 | Bellator 58 | November 19, 2011 | Seminole Hard Rock Hotel & Casino | Hollywood, Florida, U.S. | |
| 57 | Bellator 57 | November 12, 2011 | Casino Rama | Rama, Ontario, Canada | |
| 56 | Bellator 56 | October 29, 2011 | Memorial Hall | Kansas City, Kansas, U.S. | |
| 55 | Bellator 55 | October 22, 2011 | Cocopah Resort and Casino | Somerton, Arizona, U.S. | |
| 54 | Bellator 54 | October 15, 2011 | Boardwalk Hall | Atlantic City, New Jersey, U.S. | |
| 53 | Bellator 53 | October 8, 2011 | Buffalo Run Hotel & Casino | Miami, Oklahoma, U.S. | |
| 52 | Bellator 52 | October 1, 2011 | L'Auberge du Lac Resort | Lake Charles, Louisiana, U.S. | |
| 51 | Bellator 51 | September 24, 2011 | Canton Memorial Civic Center | Canton, Ohio, U.S. | |
| 50 | Bellator 50 | September 17, 2011 | Seminole Hard Rock Hotel & Casino | Hollywood, Florida, U.S. | |
| 49 | Bellator 49 | September 10, 2011 | Caesars Atlantic City | Atlantic City, New Jersey, U.S. | |
| 48 | Bellator 48 | August 20, 2011 | Mohegan Sun Arena | Uncasville, Connecticut, U.S. | |
| 47 | Bellator 47 | July 23, 2011 | Casino Rama | Rama, Ontario, Canada | |
| 46 | Bellator 46 | June 25, 2011 | Seminole Hard Rock Hotel & Casino | Hollywood, Florida, U.S. | |
| 45 | Bellator 45 | May 21, 2011 | L'Auberge du Lac Resort | Lake Charles, Louisiana, U.S. | |
| 44 | Bellator 44 | May 14, 2011 | Harrah's Resort | Atlantic City, New Jersey, U.S. | |
| 43 | Bellator 43 | May 7, 2011 | First Council Casino | Newkirk, Oklahoma, U.S. | |
| 42 | Bellator 42 | April 23, 2011 | Lucky Star Casino | Concho, Oklahoma, U.S. | |
| 41 | Bellator 41 | April 16, 2011 | Cocopah Resort and Casino | Somerton, Arizona, U.S. | |
| 40 | Bellator 40 | April 9, 2011 | First Council Casino | Newkirk, Oklahoma, U.S. | |
| 39 | Bellator 39 | April 2, 2011 | Mohegan Sun Arena | Uncasville, Connecticut, U.S. | |
| 38 | Bellator 38 | March 26, 2011 | Harrah's Tunica Hotel and Casino | Tunica, Mississippi, U.S. | |
| 37 | Bellator 37 | March 19, 2011 | Lucky Star Casino | Concho, Oklahoma, U.S. | |
| 36 | Bellator 36 | March 12, 2011 | Shreveport Municipal Auditorium | Shreveport, Louisiana, U.S. | |
| 35 | Bellator 35 | March 5, 2011 | Tachi Palace Hotel & Casino | Lemoore, California, U.S. | |
| 34 | Bellator 34 | October 28, 2010 | Seminole Hard Rock Hotel & Casino | Hollywood, Florida, U.S. | |
| 33 | Bellator 33 | October 21, 2010 | Liacouras Center | Philadelphia, Pennsylvania, U.S. | |
| 32 | Bellator 32 | October 14, 2010 | Kansas City Power & Light District | Kansas City, Missouri, U.S. | |
| 31 | Bellator 31 | September 30, 2010 | L'Auberge du Lac Resort | Lake Charles, Louisiana, U.S. | |
| 30 | Bellator 30 | September 23, 2010 | Fourth Street Live! | Louisville, Kentucky, U.S. | |
| 29 | Bellator 29 | September 16, 2010 | The Rave | Milwaukee, Wisconsin, U.S. | |
| 28 | Bellator 28 | September 9, 2010 | Mahalia Jackson Theater | New Orleans, Louisiana, U.S. | |
| 27 | Bellator 27 | September 2, 2010 | Majestic Theatre | San Antonio, Texas, U.S. | 600 |
| 26 | Bellator 26 | August 26, 2010 | Kansas City Power & Light District | Kansas City, Missouri, U.S. | 4,000 |
| 25 | Bellator 25 | August 19, 2010 | Chicago Theatre | Chicago, Illinois, U.S. | |
| 24 | Bellator 24 | August 12, 2010 | Seminole Hard Rock Hotel & Casino | Hollywood, Florida, U.S. | |
| 23 | Bellator 23 | June 24, 2010 | Fourth Street Live! | Louisville, Kentucky, U.S. | |
| 22 | Bellator 22 | June 17, 2010 | Kansas City Power & Light District | Kansas City, Missouri, U.S. | |
| 21 | Bellator 21 | June 10, 2010 | Seminole Hard Rock Hotel & Casino | Hollywood, Florida, U.S. | |
| 20 | Bellator 20 | May 27, 2010 | Majestic Theatre | San Antonio, Texas, U.S. | 1,000 |
| 19 | Bellator 19 | May 20, 2010 | Verizon Theater | Grand Prairie, Texas, U.S. | |
| 18 | Bellator 18 | May 13, 2010 | Monroe Civic Center | Monroe, Louisiana, U.S. | |
| 17 | Bellator 17 | May 6, 2010 | Citi Performing Arts Center: Wang Theatre | Boston, Massachusetts, U.S. | 1,000 |
| 16 | Bellator 16 | April 29, 2010 | Kansas City Power & Light District | Kansas City, Missouri, U.S. | |
| 15 | Bellator 15 | April 22, 2010 | Mohegan Sun Arena | Uncasville, Connecticut, U.S. | |
| 14 | Bellator 14 | April 15, 2010 | Chicago Theatre | Chicago, Illinois, U.S. | |
| 13 | Bellator 13 | April 8, 2010 | Seminole Hard Rock Hotel & Casino | Hollywood, Florida, U.S. | |
| 12 | Bellator 12 | June 19, 2009 | Seminole Hard Rock Hotel & Casino | Hollywood, Florida, U.S. | |
| 11 | Bellator 11 | June 12, 2009 | Mohegan Sun Arena | Uncasville, Connecticut, U.S. | |
| 10 | Bellator 10 | June 5, 2009 | Citizens Business Bank Arena | Ontario, California, U.S. | |
| 9 | Bellator 9 | May 29, 2009 | Monroe Civic Center | Monroe, Louisiana, U.S. | |
| 7 | Bellator 7 | May 15, 2009 | Aragon Ballroom | Chicago, Illinois, U.S. | |
| 6 | Bellator 6 | May 8, 2009 | Central Pavilion Arena | Robstown, Texas, U.S. | |
| 5 | Bellator 5 | May 1, 2009 | Hara Arena | Dayton, Ohio, U.S. | |
| 4 | Bellator 4 | April 17, 2009 | Lloyd Noble Center | Norman, Oklahoma, U.S. | 3,850 |
| 3 | Bellator 3 | April 17, 2009 | Lloyd Noble Center | Norman, Oklahoma, U.S. | 4,297 |
| 2 | Bellator 2 | April 10, 2009 | Mohegan Sun Arena | Uncasville, Connecticut, U.S. | 1,283 |
| 1 | Bellator 1 | April 3, 2009 | Seminole Hard Rock Hotel & Casino | Hollywood, Florida, U.S. | 1,756 |

- Bellator 3 and 4 was entirely just one fight card on one night, but were divided in two half-hour episodes that aired on ESPN Deportes via tape delay later. Bellator 3 aired on April 18, 2009, and Bellator 4 aired on April 25, 2009.
- There was no Bellator 8 fight card, instead Bellator ran a "Road to the Championship" episode that was entitled Bellator 8.

== Events locations ==
- Total events: 312

These cities have hosted the following numbers of Bellator events as of Bellator Champions Series 5

United States (253)

- California (49)
  - San Jose, California – 13
  - Temecula, California – 13
  - Inglewood, California – 7
  - Fresno, California – 4
  - Irvine, California – 3
  - San Diego, California – 3
  - Long Beach, California – 2
  - Anaheim, California – 1
  - Lemoore, California – 1
  - Ontario, California – 1
  - Visalia, California – 1
- Connecticut (47)
  - Uncasville, Connecticut – 46
  - Bridgeport, Connecticut – 1
- Oklahoma (27)
  - Thackerville, Oklahoma – 21
  - Concho, Oklahoma – 2
  - Newkirk, Oklahoma – 2
  - Miami, Oklahoma – 1
  - Norman, Oklahoma – 1
- Florida (13)
  - Hollywood, Florida – 11
  - Tampa, Florida – 2
- New Jersey (11)
  - Atlantic City, New Jersey – 11
- Louisiana (10)
  - Lake Charles, Louisiana – 4
  - Monroe, Louisiana – 2
  - New Orleans, Louisiana – 2
  - Bossier City, Louisiana – 1
  - Shreveport, Louisiana – 1
- Illinois (9)
  - Chicago – 6
  - Rosemont, Illinois – 3
- Missouri (9)
  - Kansas City, Missouri – 4
  - St. Louis, Missouri – 4
  - St. Charles, Missouri – 1
- Hawaii (8)
  - Honolulu, Hawaii – 8
- Kansas (8)
  - Mulvane, Kansas – 7
  - Kansas City, Kansas – 1
- Texas (8)
  - San Antonio, Texas – 2
  - Cedar Park, Texas – 1
  - Grand Prairie, Texas – 1
  - Hidalgo, Texas – 1
  - Houston, Texas – 1
  - Laredo, Texas – 1
  - Robstown, Texas – 1
- Arizona (6)
  - Phoenix, Arizona – 4
  - Yuma, Arizona – 2
- Indiana (4)
  - Hammond, Indiana – 4
- New York (4)
  - New York City, New York – 2
  - Uniondale, New York – 1
  - Verona, New York – 1
- Ohio (4)
  - Dayton, Ohio – 2
  - Canton, Ohio – 1
  - Cleveland, Ohio – 1
- Pennsylvania (4)
  - Philadelphia – 1
  - Reading, Pennsylvania – 1
  - Bethlehem, Pennsylvania – 1
  - University Park, Pennsylvania – 1
- South Dakota (4)
  - Sioux Falls, South Dakota – 4
- Iowa (3)
  - Council Bluffs, Iowa – 2
  - Cedar Rapids, Iowa – 1
- New Mexico (3)
  - Rio Rancho, New Mexico – 3
- Michigan (3)
  - Mount Pleasant, Michigan – 2
  - Plymouth Township, Michigan – 1
- Mississippi (3)
  - Tunica, Mississippi – 2
  - Southaven, Mississippi – 1
- Idaho (2)
  - Boise, Idaho – 2
- Kentucky (2)
  - Louisville, Kentucky – 2
- Nevada (2)
  - Reno, Nevada – 1
  - Whitney, Nevada – 1
- Utah (2)
  - West Valley City, Utah – 2
- Georgia (1)
  - Duluth, Georgia – 1
- Maine (1)
  - Lewiston, Maine – 1
- Massachusetts (1)
  - Boston, Massachusetts – 1
- North Carolina (1)
  - Charlotte, North Carolina – 1
- Oregon (1)
  - Portland, Oregon – 1
- Rhode Island (1)
  - Kingston, Rhode Island – 1
- Tennessee (1)
  - Memphis, Tennessee – 1
- Washington (1)
  - Tacoma, Washington – 1
- West Virginia (1)
  - Chester, West Virginia – 1
- Wisconsin (1)
  - Milwaukee – 1

England (11)

- London, England – 8
- Newcastle, England – 2
- Birmingham, England – 1

(Republic of Ireland) Ireland (11)

- Dublin, Ireland – 11

Italy (11)

- Milan, Italy – 5
- Florence, Italy – 2
- Torino, Italy – 2
- Genoa, Italy – 1
- Rome, Italy – 1

Canada (7)

- Ontario (7)
  - Rama, Ontario – 5
  - Windsor, Ontario – 2

France (4)

- Paris, France – 4

Israel (4)

- Tel Aviv, Israel – 4

Japan (3)

- Saitama, Japan – 3

Hungary (2)

- Budapest, Hungary – 2

Northern Ireland (2)

- Belfast, United Kingdom – 2

Russia (1)

- Moscow, Russia – 1

Saudi Arabia (1)

- Riyadh, Saudi Arabia – 1

== See also ==
- List of DREAM events
- List of EliteXC events
- List of Invicta FC events
- List of ONE Championship events
- List of Pancrase events
- List of Pride FC events
- List of PFL/WSOF events
- List of Shooto Events
- List of UFC events
- List of WEC events
