= Bellator 259 =

Bellator mixed martial arts event in 2021

Bellator 259: Cyborg vs. Smith 2
- The poster for Bellator 259: Cyborg vs. Smith 2
- Promotion: Bellator MMA
- Date: May 21, 2021
- Venue: Mohegan Sun Arena
- City: Uncasville, Connecticut, United States

Event chronology
Bellator 258: Archuleta vs. Pettis	Bellator 259: Cyborg vs. Smith 2	Bellator 260: Lima vs. Amosov

Bellator 259: Cyborg vs. Smith 2 was a mixed martial arts event that was produced by Bellator MMA at Mohegan Sun Arena in Uncasville, Connecticut.

== Background ==
The event featured a Bellator Women's Featherweight Championship bout between the champion Cris Cyborg and Leslie Smith. They previously met at UFC 198, which was Cyborg's UFC debut, where she won by TKO in the first round.

A bantamweight bout between Brett Johns and Matheus Mattos was announced as part of the event. On May 13, it was announced that Mattos had pulled out from the bout after contracting COVID-19 and was replaced by former Titan FC Bantamweight Champion Danny Sabatello.

A middleweight contest between the #3 ranked Austin Vanderford and #4 ranked Fabian Edwards also took place at the event.

Former Bellator Bantamweight Champion Darrion Caldwell made his return to bantamweight against Leandro Higo on the main card.

A women's flyweight bout between Valerie Loureda and Hannah Guy was set for Bellator 258, but was moved to this event.

A lightweight bout between Alfie Davis and Alexandr Shabliy took place at the event as part of the undercard.

Two additional lightweight bouts were added to the preliminary portion of the card, as Saad Awad took on Nate Andrews, while Aviv Gozali faced Sean Felton.

A women's featherweight bout between Leah McCourt and Janay Harding also took place during the preliminary fights.

Two ranked light heavyweights, the #8 ranked Tyree Fortune and #6 ranked Grant Neal, faced off on the prelims.

A lightweight bout between Georgi Karakhanyan and Adam Piccolotti was expected to take place at this event. However, Piccolotti pulled out due to injury and the bout was canceled.

At the weigh-ins, Leandro Higo and Leah McCourt missed weight for their respective bouts. Higo weighed in at 137.5 pounds, one and a half pounds over the bantamweight non-title fight limit. McCourt weighed in at 149.4 pounds, three and a half pounds over the featherweight non-title fight limit. Both their bouts proceeded at catchweight and they were fined a percentage of their purses, which went to their respective opponents, Darrion Caldwell and Janay Harding.

A light heavyweight bout between Christian Edwards and Ben Parrish was scrapped after weigh-ins after Edwards wasn't cleared to compete by the Mohegan Sun Athletic Commission. As a result, Valerie Loureda vs. Hannah Guy was promoted to the main card. After being cleared by a commission doctor on May 26, the bout was rebooked for Bellator 261.

== Results ==
Main Card (Showtime)
Weight class				Method	Round	Time	Notes
Women's Featherweight	Cris Cyborg (c)	def.	Leslie Smith	TKO (punches)	5	4:51	(Note: For the Bellator Women's Featherweight World Championship.)
Catchweight (137.5 lb)	Leandro Higo	def.	Darrion Caldwell	Decision (split) (28-29, 29-28, 29-28)	3	5:00	(Note: Higo missed weight and was fined 20% of his purse.)
Middleweight	Austin Vanderford	def.	Fabian Edwards	Decision (unanimous) (30-27, 30-27, 30-27)	3	5:00
Welterweight	Jaleel Willis	def.	Maycon Mendonça	Decision (unanimous) (29-28, 29-28, 30-27)	3	5:00
Women's Flyweight	Hannah Guy	def.	Valerie Loureda	Decision (unanimous) (30-27, 29-28, 29-28)	3	5:00
Preliminary card (Youtube/Pluto TV)
Lightweight	Saad Awad	def.	Nate Andrews	TKO (punches)	1	3:16
Light Heavyweight	Grant Neal	def.	Tyree Fortune	Submission (rear-naked choke)	1	4:20
Women's Flyweight	Sumiko Inaba	def.	Kristina Katsikis	TKO (punches)	3	3:35
Lightweight	Aviv Gozali	def.	Sean Felton	Submission (heel hook)	1	1:17
Heavyweight	Davion Franklin	def.	Tyler King	KO (punches)	1	2:02
Catchweight (149.4 lb)	Leah McCourt	def.	Janay Harding	Submission (triangle choke)	2	2:42	(Note: McCourt missed weight and was fined 20% of her purse.)
Bantamweight	Danny Sabatello	def.	Brett Johns	Decision (unanimous) (30-27, 30-27, 30-27)	3	5:00
Lightweight	Alexandr Shabliy	def.	Alfie Davis	Decision (unanimous) (30-27, 30-27, 30-27)	3	5:00

== See also ==
- 2021 in Bellator MMA
- List of Bellator MMA events
- List of current Bellator fighters
