= Paul Daley =

English mixed martial arts (MMA) fighter

- Born: Paul Anthony Daley; 21 February 1983 (age 43); London, England, United Kingdom
- Other names: Semtex
- Nationality: English
- Height: 5 ft 9 in (175 cm)
- Weight: 171 lb (78 kg; 12 st 3 lb)
- Division: Welterweight
- Reach: 76 in (193 cm)
- Style: Kickboxing
- Stance: Orthodox
- Fighting out of: Nottingham, England, United Kingdom
- Team: Spirit Dojo
- Rank: Blue belt in the BOLT Wrestling System; Black belt in Brazilian Jiu-Jitsu under Lee Bown
- Years active: 2003–2022

Kickboxing record
- Total: 24
- Wins: 21
- By knockout: 14
- Losses: 3
- By knockout: 0

Mixed martial arts record
- Total: 64
- Wins: 44
- By knockout: 35
- By decision: 9
- Losses: 18
- By knockout: 2
- By submission: 6
- By decision: 10
- Draws: 2

Other information
- Mixed martial arts record from Sherdog
- Last updated on: 5 April 2014

Paul Anthony Daley (born 21 February 1983) is an English former mixed martial artist and kickboxer. A professional competitor from 2003 to 2022, Daley competed for the UFC, Bellator, K-1, Strikeforce, Cage Rage, Final Fight Championship, EliteXC, ShoXC, BAMMA, Cage Warriors, Cage Contender, Shark Fights, Pancrase, and Impact FC. Daley is a former Cage Rage World Welterweight Champion and Cage Rage British Welterweight Champion and a Strikeforce title challenger.

== Background ==
Born in London, England to parents from the Caribbean, Daley moved to Nottingham at a young age, where he played junior football for Nottingham Forest FC alongside future England international, Jermaine Jenas. Daley began training in karate at the age of eight, before transitioning into Muay Thai.

Daley is also a former member of the British Army, having served as a reconnaissance driver for the Household Cavalry.

At the age of 18, Daley began training in mixed martial arts after graduation from Carlton-Le-Willows Academy.

Daley has two children, Tai and Ayana, with his long-term partner Elizabeth Houston. They live in Nottingham, England.

== Mixed martial arts career ==
=== Early career ===
Daley made his professional debut in 2003 and compiled a record of 2-2 before signing with startup promotion Cage Rage.

=== Cage Rage ===
Following a TKO win over Jess Liaudin, Daley fought for the Cage Warriors Welterweight Championship against Abdul Mohamed. The fight ended in a draw after five rounds. Daley next fought veteran Paul Jenkins at Cage Rage 11 for the Cage Rage British Welterweight Championship, a rematch of their fight at Cage Warriors 8, which ended in a knockout win for Daley. The two fought to a draw in the rematch.

Daley had compiled a record of 10-4-2 and was coming off of a win over UFC veteran Dave Strasser before being offered another shot at the Cage Rage British Welterweight Championship, against Ross Mason. Daley won via majority decision, becoming the new Cage Rage British Welterweight Champion.

After defending his title twice and picking up a knockout win over Duane Ludwig in Strikeforce, Daley was scheduled to make his third title defence in a title unification against Cage Rage World Welterweight Champion Mark Weir at Cage Rage 23. Daley won via second-round knockout, therefore holding both titles. After two more knockout wins in the ShoXC and Cage Warriors promotions, Daley fought Jake Shields at EliteXC: Heat for the EliteXC Welterweight Championship. Daley lost via armbar submission in the second round, snapping a six-fight winning streak. Daley then compiled a record of 3–1 in his next four fights with two appearances for the MFC in Canada.

Daley was scheduled to fight Jay Hieron at Affliction: Trilogy, but the bout was cancelled due to Affliction Entertainment folding.

=== Ultimate Fighting Championship ===
Following Affliction's collapse, Daley signed a four-fight contract with the UFC. Daley's first fight was scheduled to be on the preliminary card of UFC 103 against Brian Foster, which was due to air on ESPN (UK), prior to the main card. However, on 4 September, it was announced that Daley had agreed to step in for Mike Swick, who had suffered an injury during training and was unable to fight top contender Martin Kampmann at UFC 103.

In his UFC debut, Daley put in an aggressive performance, defeating Kampmann via technical knockout due to a barrage of punches. The fight was considered a premature stoppage by many, as Kampmann was still defending himself.

Daley was expected to face Carlos Condit on 2 January 2010 at UFC 108. However, Condit withdrew from the card after suffering a severe cut to his hand. He was replaced by Dustin Hazelett.

After failing to make the stipulated 170 lb for the Hazelett fight, Daley was fined 10% of his fight purse. The bout was fought at a catchweight of 172 lbs. Early in the fight Daley dropped Hazelett with a left hook, then followed up with additional punches, winning by knockout.

==== Welterweight contendership ====
At UFC 113, on 8 May 2010, Daley fought Josh Koscheck, with the winner destined to become the next challenger against Georges St-Pierre for the UFC Welterweight Championship and the opportunity to coach against St-Pierre on the twelfth season of The Ultimate Fighter.

In the first round, Koscheck appeared to simulate being hit with an illegal knee, which resulted in a point deduction for Daley. Koscheck went on to control Daley with his wrestling for most of the fight, and was declared the winner by unanimous decision. After the end of the third and final round, Daley approached Koscheck from behind and attempted to hit him in the face with a left hook. Referee Dan Miragliotta pinned Daley against the fence to subdue him. In an interview at the conclusion of the event, UFC president Dana White announced that he was banishing Daley from the UFC for life. White said, "There's no excuse for that. These guys are professional athletes. You don't ever hit a guy blatantly after the bell like that, whether you're frustrated or not." He added, "I don't care if he fights in every show all over the world and becomes the best and everybody thinks he's the pound-for-pound best in the world, he will never fight in the UFC ever again." White also said that when he spoke to Daley after the fight, he claimed he had not heard the bell.

Daley apologised for his actions after returning to the United Kingdom, saying that Koscheck's trash-talking pushed him over the edge, but that there was "no excuse" for his "rash decision." He was suspended 30 days by the Quebec Athletic Commission.

=== BAMMA ===
Daley's fight against Yuya Shirai was supposed to be for the BAMMA welterweight belt, but Daley came in over the 170-pound limit for a title bout. The two still headlined the card, but it became a non-title fight. Daley dropped Shirai immediately with a jab, which was his first strike in the fight, and later he dropped him again with an uppercut and left hook before finishing the fight with ground and pound.

=== Strikeforce ===
Following a win over Jorge Masvidal in the Shark Fights promotion, Daley signed a multi-fight deal with Strikeforce and made his promotional debut against Scott Smith on 4 December 2010 at Strikeforce: Henderson vs. Babalu II. Daley won by KO at 2:09 of round 1. In the post-fight interview, he called out lightweight K. J. Noons.

After his victory over Scott Smith, Daley received the title shot against Nick Diaz.

Daley fought Nick Diaz on 9 April 2011 at Strikeforce: Diaz vs. Daley. Diaz won by TKO three seconds from the end of the first round, marking the first time Daley had been stopped by strikes.

After a 3-month hiatus, Daley was expected to face Evangelista Santos at Strikeforce: Fedor vs. Henderson, but Santos withdrew due to a shoulder injury and was replaced by Tyron Woodley. The winner of this fight was expected to fight for the vacant Strikeforce Welterweight Championship against a fighter yet to be named. He lost the bout via unanimous decision, with all three judges scoring the fight 29–28 in favour of Woodley.

Daley fought against Kazuo Misaki at Strikeforce: Tate vs. Rousey. He lost the bout via split decision.

After some months, Daley requested to be released from his Strikeforce contract, citing a lack of frequent fights as the reason for his wanting to leave.

=== Independent promotions ===
Daley defeated Daniel Acacio at an Impact Fighting Championships event in Sydney, Australia. Speaking after his victory, Daley revealed that he expected to sign with Strikeforce or DREAM "real soon."

Daley faced Jorge Masvidal at Shark Fights 13: Jardine vs. Prangley in September 2010, and won via unanimous decision. Before the fight, he weighed in three-quarters of a pound overweight and was forced to give up 15% of his "show purse".

Daley was next scheduled to fight twice in just over five weeks. The first bout was against UFC veteran Jordan Radev at BAMMA 7, and the second bout was against UFC and MFC veteran Luigi Fioravanti at Ringside MMA 12 - Daley vs. Fioravanti. Daley won both via unanimous decision.

Daley was expected to fight in a kickboxing bout at UCMMA 26 against Luke Sines for his 'UK1' Welterweight Championship, however, Daley had to pull out of the fight due to contract problems with Strikeforce.

=== Bellator MMA ===
On 15 June, a week after being released from his Strikeforce contract, Daley signed with Bellator Fighting Championships. Daley had a successful debut at Bellator 72 against Rudy Bears in a welterweight fight, defeating him by first-round TKO due to strikes.

Daley was next scheduled to fight at Bellator 79 in Rama, Ontario, Canada on 2 November against Kyle Baker, but the fight never took place.

Daley was selected in a fan vote to fight War Machine in the first Bellator fight to be shown on Spike TV, however injury forced his opponent out of the upcoming Welterweight tournament. Daley himself was then removed from the tournament after being barred from entering the United States after being arrested in December in relation to an alleged bar fight in England. He faced up to two years in prison if convicted. Daley later claimed the charges had been thrown out for lack of evidence, clearing him to apply for a visa to compete within Bellator's ninth season.

On 25 July, Bellator announced that Daley had been released from the organisation due to ongoing legal troubles. Bellator officials had learned that the charges in the bar fight had not been dropped after all. In fact, Daley had pleaded guilty to one count of assault and two counts of obstructing an officer. The violent nature of the incident, combined with the prospect of continued visa problems due to the fact he was now a convicted felon, made Bellator officials decide to cut ties with Daley.

=== Return to BAMMA ===
On 6 August 2013, it was reported that Daley had signed a 3-fight, 12-month contract with BAMMA. His first fight back in the British promotion was against Romario Manoel da Silva at BAMMA 14 on 14 December. He defeated da Silva by KO at 1:42 of the 2nd round, after dominating the 1st round.

Daley won via TKO in a fight against Alexander Surjko at Legend 3: Pour Homme in Milan, Italy on 5 April 2014, dropping the Russian three times in the third round and forcing referee Joop Ubeda to stop the fight.

At BAMMA 16, Daley defeated Marinho Moreira da Rocha by knockout on 13 September 2014.

=== Return to Bellator MMA ===
On 21 July 2014, Bellator MMA announced that they had signed Paul Daley along with Melvin Manhoef.

Daley was expected to challenge Douglas Lima for the Bellator Welterweight Championship on 27 February 2015 at Bellator 134. However, Lima pulled out of the fight due to injury. Daley instead faced André Santos. He won the fight by unanimous decision.

Daley faced Dennis Olson at Bellator 140 on 17 July 2015. He won the fight via TKO in the second round.

In his third fight for Bellator in less than a year, Daley faced Andy Uhrich in the main event at Bellator 148 on 29 January 2016. He won the fight via knockout due to a right uppercut two minutes into the first round.

Daley's next fight was scheduled to be a rematch against Josh Koscheck at Bellator London, as the co-main event, on 16 July 2016. On 6 June Koscheck withdrew from the fight for undisclosed reasons and he was replaced by former Bellator Welterweight Champion Douglas Lima.

A welterweight bout between Daley and Derek Anderson at Bellator 163 was scrapped on the day of the event after Daley fell ill from effects of his weight cut.

Daley next faced Brennan Ward in the co-main event at Bellator 170 on 21 January 2017. He won the fight via flying knee in the first round.

Daley faced Rory MacDonald in the main event at Bellator 179 on 19 May 2017. He lost via rear-naked choke in the second round.

Daley faced Lorenz Larkin at Bellator 183 on 23 September 2017. Daley won the fight via knockout in the second round.

In January 2018, Daley publicly criticised Bellator MMA, stating he would leave the company after his contract expired because he felt the company was not properly utilising him. A week later on 25 January, Daley claimed to have been granted his release from the organisation, which Bellator denied.

On 2 March 2018 Bellator MMA announced that Daley would fight Jon Fitch at Bellator 199 in San Jose, CA. He lost the fight by unanimous decision.

Despite publicly demanding release from Bellator, Daley announced that he had signed a new contract with Bellator on late June 2018.

Daley faced Michael Page as part of the Bellator Welterweight World Grand Prix Tournament on 16 February 2019 at Bellator 216. The fight was largely uneventful, with neither fighter able to deliver any significant offence. Daley lost by unanimous decision.

Daley faced Erick Silva at Bellator 223 on 22 June 2019. He won the fight by unanimous decision.

Daley was expected to face Sabah Homasi at Bellator 232 on 26 October 2019. However, Homasi withdrew from the bout due to injury and was replaced by Saad Awad. Daley won the fight via TKO in the second round.

Daley was rescheduled to face Sabah Homasi at Bellator 241 on 13 March 2020. However, the whole event was eventually cancelled due to the prevailing COVID-19 pandemic.

Daley was then scheduled again to face Derek Anderson at Bellator 247 on 1 October 2020. However, he was not unable to make weight and was hospitalised, leading to the bout being scrapped. After the incident, Daley announced that he will retire after his next bout.

Daley was rescheduled for the third time to face Sabah Homasi on 16 April 2021 at Bellator 257. Despite being dropped and nearly finished in the first round, Daley made a comeback and won the bout via second round technical knockout.

Daley faced Jason Jackson on June 11, 2021, at Bellator 260. He lost the fight by unanimous decision after getting controlled on the ground for the majority of the contest.

Daley was scheduled to face Andrey Koreshkov in his retirement fight, on May 13, 2022, at Bellator 281. However, due to undisclosed reasons, Koreshkov pulled out of the bout and was replaced by Wendell Giácomo. Prior to the bout, Daley announced this would be his final MMA fight. He won the fight via knockout in the second round.

== Kickboxing career ==
After a record of 21-3 as an amateur he started his Pro Career going 11-0 winning 2 English Titles, then he left Kickboxing and continued with MMA instead. Daley has had five kickboxing wins since returning to the sport in August 2014, when he defeated Latvian champion Artem Mironcev on 16 August in Bournemouth, England at the Phoenix Fight Night 3 event. Daley won the fight by TKO in round 3.

== Boxing career ==
Daley was said to make his boxing debut on April 1, 2022, against Anthony Taylor, however due to medical issues Taylor withdrew and was would be replaced by Markus Perez. However a few weeks before the fight was about to take place Daley pulled out after having issues with his visa.

== Weight issues ==
Daley has had a history of missing weight in fights, with the BAMMA 7 weigh-in marking the 6th time in the previous 14 fights that Daley had missed weight for a fight. Two separate bouts with Derek Anderson at Bellator 163 and Bellator 247 were cancelled due to weight-cutting related issues of Daley.

== Championships and accomplishments ==
=== Mixed martial arts ===
- Cage Rage Championships
  - Cage Rage World Welterweight Championship (one time; last)
  - Cage Rage British Welterweight Championship (one time)
- Strikeforce
  - 2010 Knockout of the Year vs. Scott Smith on 4 December
- Ultimate Fighting Championship
  - Knockout of the Night (one time)
  - UFC.com Awards
    - 2009: Newcomer of the Year
- FX3
  - FX3 Welterweight Championship (one time)
- Sherdog
  - 2010 All-Violence Third Team
- MMA Junkie
  - 2021 April Fight of the Month vs. Sabah Homasi
- Bloody Elbow
  - 2010 Knockout of the Year vs. Scott Smith at Strikeforce: Henderson vs. Babalu II

=== Kickboxing ===
- 2014 Contender Promotions Kickboxing World Welterweight Champion
- 2008 King of the Ring World Muay Thai Welterweight Champion
- King of the Ring European Muay Thai Champion

== Mixed martial arts record ==
Professional record breakdown
| 63 matches | 43 wins | 18 losses |
| By knockout | 35 | 2 |
| By submission | 0 | 6 |
| By decision | 8 | 10 |
| Draws | 2 | |

| Res. | Record | Opponent | Method | Event | Date | Round | Time | Location | Notes |
|---|---|---|---|---|---|---|---|---|---|
| Win | 44–18–2 | Wendell Giácomo | KO (punches) | Bellator 281 | 13 May 2022 | 2 | 4:09 | London, England | Catchweight (175 lb) bout. |
| Loss | 43–18–2 | Jason Jackson | Decision (unanimous) | Bellator 260 | 11 June 2021 | 3 | 5:00 | Uncasville, Connecticut, United States | Catchweight (175 lb) bout. |
| Win | 43–17–2 | Sabah Homasi | TKO (punches) | Bellator 257 | 16 April 2021 | 2 | 1:44 | Uncasville, Connecticut, United States | Catchweight (175 lb) bout. |
| Win | 42–17–2 | Saad Awad | TKO (punches) | Bellator 232 | 26 October 2019 | 2 | 1:30 | Uncasville, Connecticut, United States | Catchweight (175 lbs) bout. |
| Win | 41–17–2 | Erick Silva | Decision (unanimous) | Bellator 223 | 22 June 2019 | 3 | 5:00 | London, England | |
| Loss | 40–17–2 | Michael Page | Decision (unanimous) | Bellator 216 | 16 February 2019 | 5 | 5:00 | Uncasville, Connecticut, United States | Bellator Welterweight World Grand Prix Quarterfinal. |
| Loss | 40–16–2 | Jon Fitch | Decision (unanimous) | Bellator 199 | 12 May 2018 | 3 | 5:00 | San Jose, California, United States | |
| Win | 40–15–2 | Lorenz Larkin | KO (punches) | Bellator 183 | 24 September 2017 | 2 | 2:40 | San Jose, California, United States | |
| Loss | 39–15–2 | Rory MacDonald | Submission (rear-naked choke) | Bellator 179 | 19 May 2017 | 2 | 1:45 | London, England | Bellator Welterweight title eliminator. |
| Win | 39–14–2 | Brennan Ward | KO (flying knee) | Bellator 170 | 21 January 2017 | 1 | 2:27 | Inglewood, California, United States | |
| Loss | 38–14–2 | Douglas Lima | Decision (unanimous) | Bellator 158 | 16 July 2016 | 3 | 5:00 | London, England, United Kingdom | |
| Win | 38–13–2 | Andy Uhrich | KO (punch) | Bellator 148 | 29 January 2016 | 1 | 2:00 | Fresno, California, United States | |
| Win | 37–13–2 | Dennis Olson | TKO (punches) | Bellator 140 | 17 July 2015 | 2 | 1:12 | Uncasville, Connecticut, United States | |
| Win | 36–13–2 | André Santos | Decision (unanimous) | Bellator 134 | 27 February 2015 | 3 | 5:00 | Uncasville, Connecticut, United States | |
| Win | 35–13–2 | Marinho Moreira da Rocha | KO (punch to the body) | BAMMA 16: Daley vs. da Rocha | 13 September 2014 | 2 | 3:40 | Manchester, England | |
| Win | 34–13–2 | Romario Manoel da Silva | KO (punch) | BAMMA 14: Daley vs. da Silva | 14 December 2013 | 2 | 1:42 | Birmingham, England | |
| Loss | 33–13–2 | Alexander Yakovlev | Decision (unanimous) | Legend Fight Show 2 | 8 November 2013 | 3 | 5:00 | Moscow, Russia | |
| Win | 33–12–2 | Lukasz Chlewicki | TKO (doctor stoppage) | CWFC 57 | 20 July 2013 | 1 | 5:00 | Liverpool, England, United Kingdom | |
| Win | 32–12–2 | Rodrigo Ribeiro | KO (punches) | Dubai Fighting Championship 4 | 10 May 2013 | 2 | 1:03 | Dubai, United Arab Emirates | |
| Win | 31–12–2 | Patrick Vallee | KO (flying knee) | Cage Contender 16: Daley vs. Vallee | 23 February 2013 | 2 | 4:12 | Dublin, Ireland | |
| Win | 30–12–2 | Rudy Bears | TKO (punches) | Bellator 72 | 20 July 2012 | 1 | 2:45 | Tampa, Florida, United States | |
| Loss | 29–12–2 | Kazuo Misaki | Decision (split) | Strikeforce: Tate vs. Rousey | 3 March 2012 | 3 | 5:00 | Columbus, Ohio, United States | |
| Win | 29–11–2 | Luigi Fioravanti | Decision (unanimous) | Ringside MMA 12: Daley vs. Fioravanti | 21 October 2011 | 3 | 5:00 | Montreal, Quebec, Canada | |
| Win | 28–11–2 | Jordan Radev | Decision (unanimous) | BAMMA 7: Trigg vs. Wallhead | 10 September 2011 | 3 | 5:00 | Birmingham, United Kingdom | 176 lb catchweight bout. |
| Loss | 27–11–2 | Tyron Woodley | Decision (unanimous) | Strikeforce: Fedor vs. Henderson | 30 July 2011 | 3 | 5:00 | Hoffman Estates, Illinois, United States | |
| Loss | 27–10–2 | Nick Diaz | TKO (punches) | Strikeforce: Diaz vs. Daley | 9 April 2011 | 1 | 4:57 | San Diego, California, United States | For the Strikeforce Welterweight Championship |
| Win | 27–9–2 | Yuya Shirai | KO (punches) | BAMMA 5: Daley vs. Shirai | 26 February 2011 | 1 | 1:46 | Manchester, United Kingdom | Originally for BAMMA WW title, later changed to non-title bout after Daley weighed in over the 170 lb limit. |
| Win | 26–9–2 | Scott Smith | KO (punch) | Strikeforce: Henderson vs. Babalu II | 4 December 2010 | 1 | 2:09 | St. Louis, Missouri, United States | Strikeforce Best of 2010 Awards Knockout of the Year. |
| Win | 25–9–2 | Jorge Masvidal | Decision (unanimous) | Shark Fights 13: Jardine vs Prangley | 11 September 2010 | 3 | 5:00 | Amarillo, Texas, United States | 171.75 lb catchweight bout. |
| Win | 24–9–2 | Daniel Acacio | TKO (submission to elbow) | Impact FC 2 | 18 July 2010 | 3 | 1:15 | Sydney, Australia | |
| Loss | 23–9–2 | Josh Koscheck | Decision (unanimous) | UFC 113 | 8 May 2010 | 3 | 5:00 | Montreal, Quebec, Canada | UFC Welterweight title eliminator. Released from UFC for hitting Koscheck after the bell. |
| Win | 23–8–2 | Dustin Hazelett | KO (punches) | UFC 108 | 2 January 2010 | 1 | 2:24 | Las Vegas, Nevada, United States | 172lb catchweight; Knockout of the Night. |
| Win | 22–8–2 | Martin Kampmann | TKO (punches) | UFC 103 | 19 September 2009 | 1 | 2:31 | Dallas, Texas, United States | |
| Win | 21–8–2 | Porfirio Alves Jr. | TKO (punches) | WFC 8: D-Day | 18 April 2009 | 1 | 2:29 | Ljubljana, Slovenia | |
| Win | 20–8–2 | Aurelijus Kerpe | KO (knee and punches) | Ultimate Gladiators | 29 March 2009 | 1 | 1:35 | Nottingham, United Kingdom | |
| Loss | 19–8–2 | Nick Thompson | Decision (unanimous) | MFC 20 | 20 February 2009 | 3 | 5:00 | Edmonton, Alberta, Canada | |
| Win | 19–7–2 | John Alessio | TKO (punches) | MFC 19: Long Time Coming | 5 December 2008 | 2 | 2:18 | Edmonton, Alberta, Canada | |
| Loss | 18–7–2 | Jake Shields | Submission (armbar) | EliteXC: Heat | 4 October 2008 | 2 | 3:47 | Sunrise, Florida, United States | For EliteXC Welterweight Championship |
| Win | 18–6–2 | Bojan Kosednar | KO (punch) | KOTC: Badlands | 12 July 2008 | 1 | 4:53 | Nottingham, United Kingdom | |
| Win | 17–6–2 | Sam Morgan | KO (elbow) | ShoXC: Elite Challenger Series | 25 January 2008 | 1 | 2:12 | Atlantic City, New Jersey, United States | |
| Win | 16–6–2 | Mark Weir | TKO (punches) | Cage Rage 23 | 22 September 2007 | 2 | 2:14 | London, United Kingdom | Defended Cage Rage British Welterweight Championship; Won Cage Rage World Welterweight Championship |
| Win | 15–6–2 | Duane Ludwig | TKO (punches) | Strikeforce: Shamrock vs. Baroni | 22 June 2007 | 2 | 0:42 | San Jose, California, United States | |
| Win | 14–6–2 | Paul Jenkins | TKO (submission to punch to the body) | Cage Rage 21 | 21 April 2007 | 2 | 0:41 | Nottingham, United Kingdom | Defended Cage Rage British Welterweight Championship |
| Win | 13–6–2 | Daniel Weichel | KO (knee) | FX3: Fight Night 4 | 10 March 2007 | 1 | 2:53 | London, United Kingdom | Won FX3 Welterweight Championship |
| Loss | 12–6–2 | Luiz Azeredo | Decision (unanimous) | Cage Rage 19 | 9 December 2006 | 3 | 5:00 | London, United Kingdom | |
| Win | 12–5–2 | Sol Gilbert | KO (punches) | Cage Rage 18 | 30 September 2006 | 2 | 2:59 | London, United Kingdom | Defended Cage Rage British Welterweight Championship |
| Loss | 11–5–2 | Satoru Kitaoka | Submission (guillotine choke) | Pancrase: Blow 6 | 27 August 2006 | 1 | 2:54 | Yokohama, Japan | |
| Win | 11–4–2 | Ross Mason | Decision (majority) | Cage Rage 17 | 1 July 2006 | 3 | 5:00 | London, United Kingdom | Won Cage Rage British Welterweight Championship |
| Win | 10–4–2 | Dave Strasser | Decision (unanimous) | Cage Rage 16 | 22 April 2006 | 3 | 5:00 | London, United Kingdom | |
| Loss | 8–4–2 | Jean Silva | TKO (dislocated thumb) | Cage Rage 15 | 4 February 2006 | 2 | 4:40 | London, United Kingdom | |
| Win | 8–3–2 | Joey Van Wanrooij | Decision (unanimous) | Cage Rage 14 | 3 December 2005 | 3 | 5:00 | London, United Kingdom | |
| Win | 7–3–2 | Peter Angerer | TKO (punches) | FX3: Battle of Britain | 15 October 2005 | 1 | 3:28 | London, United Kingdom | |
| Loss | 6–3–2 | Pat Healy | Submission (guillotine choke) | SF 11: Rumble at the Rose Garden | 9 July 2005 | 2 | 3:15 | Portland, Oregon, United States | |
| Win | 6–2–2 | Sami Berik | TKO (punches) | FX3: Xplosion | 18 June 2005 | 1 | 3:03 | Berkshire, United Kingdom | |
| Draw | 5–2–2 | Paul Jenkins | Draw | Cage Rage 11 | 30 April 2005 | 3 | 5:00 | London, United Kingdom | For the Cage Rage British Welterweight Championship |
| Draw | 5–2–1 | Abdul Mohamed | Draw | Cage Warriors 9 | 18 December 2004 | 5 | 5:00 | Sheffield, United Kingdom | For the Cage Warriors Welterweight Championship |
| Win | 5–2 | Jess Liaudin | TKO (doctor stoppage) | Cage Warriors 9: Xtreme Xmas | 27 November 2004 | 1 | 5:00 | London, United Kingdom | |
| Win | 4–2 | Paul Jenkins | TKO (punches) | Cage Warriors 8: Brutal Force | 18 September 2004 | 2 | 2:56 | Sheffield, United Kingdom | |
| Win | 3–2 | Xavier Foupa-Pokam | KO (punch) | Cage Warriors 7: Showdown | 10 July 2004 | 1 | N/A | London, United Kingdom | |
| Win | 2–2 | Lee Doski | TKO (punches and elbows) | UKMMAC 6: Extreme Warriors | 29 February 2004 | 1 | 0:41 | Essex, United Kingdom | |
| Loss | 1–2 | James Nicholl | Submission (rear-naked choke) | UKMMAC 5: Mean Intentions | 2 November 2003 | 2 | 3:41 | Essex, United Kingdom | |
| Loss | 1–1 | Florentim Amorim | Submission (rear-naked choke) | CWFC 4: UK vs. France | 27 July 2003 | 1 | N/A | Hampshire, United Kingdom | |
| Win | 1–0 | John Connelly | TKO (punches) | Extreme Brawl 3 | 29 June 2003 | 1 | N/A | Bracknell, United Kingdom | |

== Kickboxing record ==
Kickboxing record
21 wins (14 (T)KOs), 3 losses
| Date | Result | Opponent | Event | Location | Method | Round | Time | Record |
| 2015-09-19 | Win | (United States) Fernando Gonzalez | Bellator MMA & Glory: Dynamite 1 | San Jose, California, USA | Decision (unanimous) | 3 | 3:00 | |
| 2014-10-11 | Win | (Iran) Mohammad Ghaedibardeh | K-1 World MAX 2014 World Championship Tournament Final | Pattaya, Thailand | Decision (unanimous) | 3 | 3:00 | |
| 2014-08-16 | Win | (Latvia) Artem Mironcev | Phoenix Fight Night 3 | Bournemouth, England | TKO (referee stoppage) | 3 | 1:13 | |
| 2014-04-25 | Win | (Slovenia) Miran Fabjan | FFC12: Fabjan vs. Daley | Ljubljana, Slovenia | KO (left hook) | 2 | 2:41 | |
| 2014-04-05 | Win | (Russia) Alexander Surzhko | Legend 3: Pour Homme | Milan, Italy | TKO (left hook) | 3 | 2:23 | |
| 2014-03-01 | Win | (Russia) Alexander Stetsurenko | Siam Warriors: Revolution on Leeside | Cork, Ireland | TKO (left cross) | 1 | 0:40 | |
| 2014-02-15 | Win | (England) Shaun Lomas | Contender Promotions | Middlesbrough, England | TKO (3 knockdowns) | 3 | N/A | |
Won vacant Contender Promotions Welterweight Championship.
| 2008-02-24 | Win | (Lithuania) Mariusz Buzinskas | King of the Ring | Nottingham, England | TKO (knees) | 1 | | |
Won vacant King of the Ring World Welterweight Championship.
| 2006-07-15 | Win | (England) Nigel Yarde | FX3: Full Contact Fight Night 3 | Bracknell, England | RTD | 1 | 3:00 | |
| 2004-06-06 | Win | (Lithuania) Zydrunas Jasiunas | Extreme Brawl 7 | Bracknell, England | KO (punches) | 1 | 1:27 | |
| 2004-08-14 | Win | (England) Jason Howell | Full Contact Fight Night 2 | Portsmouth, England | TKO (injury) | 2 | 0:40 | |
| 2004-05-09 | Win | (Sweden) Resa Moradi | Cage Warriors 7: Showdown | Portsmouth, England | TKO (3 knockdowns) | 2 | | |
| 2004-04-11 | Win | (England) Paul Clarke | Full Contact Fight Night 1 | Portsmouth, England | TKO | 2 | | |
| 2004-03-21 | Win | (England) Aurimas Grumoda | Extreme Brawl 6 | Bracknell, England | TKO | 1 | | |
| 2003-12-21 | Win | (England) Hayden Scott | Extreme Brawl 5 | Bracknell, England | KO | 1 | | |

== See also ==
- List of current Bellator fighters
