= Strikeforce: Diaz vs. Daley =

Strikeforce mixed martial arts event in 2011

- The poster for Strikeforce: Diaz vs. Daley
- Promotion: Strikeforce
- Date: April 9, 2011
- Venue: Valley View Casino Center
- City: San Diego, California, United States

Event chronology
Strikeforce: Feijao vs. Henderson	Strikeforce: Diaz vs. Daley	Strikeforce: Overeem vs. Werdum

Strikeforce: Diaz vs. Daley was a mixed martial arts event held by Strikeforce, the event took place on April 9, 2011, at the Valley View Casino Center in San Diego, California, United States.

== Background ==
This was the first non-Challengers event that Strikeforce held under the management of their new owners Zuffa, who bought the promotion the previous month.

This event was originally expected to feature Alistair Overeem vs. Fabrício Werdum and Josh Barnett vs. Brett Rogers, the two remaining quarter-final fights in the Heavyweight Grand Prix tournament. Both the event and the fights were listed on Strikeforce's official site. However, on March 2, 2011, Scott Coker confirmed the bouts were being moved to the Strikeforce: Overeem vs. Werdum event to be held in Dallas, Texas, on June 18 with Overeem & Barnett winning the rescheduled bouts.

K. J. Noons was expected to make his return to lightweight on this card, but a bout did not materialize.

Mike Kyle was scheduled to face Gegard Mousasi, but withdrew from the bout on March 31, 2011, due to a broken hand. Keith Jardine agreed to step in on one week's notice to fight Mousasi. The Mousasi/Kyle bout finally took place at Strikeforce: Marquardt vs. Saffiedine in January 2013, where Mousasi submitted Kyle with a rear naked choke in the first round.

This is the last non-Challengers Strikeforce event to feature men's bouts in weight classes below lightweight.

The event drew an estimated average of 528,000 viewers, however peaked at 806,000 viewers.

== Results ==
Main card
Weight class				Method	Round	Time	Notes
Welterweight	Nick Diaz (c)	def.	Paul Daley	TKO (punches)	1	4:57	(Note: For the Strikeforce Welterweight Championship.)
Lightweight	Gilbert Melendez (c)	def.	Tatsuya Kawajiri	TKO (elbows)	1	3:14	(Note: For the Strikeforce Lightweight Championship.)
Light Heavyweight	Gegard Mousasi	vs.	Keith Jardine	Draw (majority) (29–27, 28–28, 28–28)	3	5:00	(Note: Mousasi was docked one point in round one for an illegal upkick.)
Lightweight	Shinya Aoki	def.	Lyle Beerbohm	Submission (neck crank)	1	1:33
Preliminary card
Middleweight	Casey Ryan	def.	Paul Song	Submission (triangle choke)	1	1:39
Catchweight (140 lbs)	Rolando Perez	def.	Edgar Cardenas	Decision (unanimous) (30–27, 30–27, 30–27)	3	5:00
Welterweight	Herman Terrado	def.	A.J. Matthews	KO (punch)	1	4:16
Lightweight	Joe Duarte	def.	Saad Awad	Submission (armbar)	2	2:45
Heavyweight	Virgil Zwicker	def.	Brett Albee	TKO (strikes)	1	1:46
Featherweight	Robbie Peralta	def.	Hiroyuki Takaya	Decision (split) (30–27, 30–27, 28–29)	3	5:00

== Payroll ==
Nick Diaz: $175,000 (no win bonus) def. Paul Daley: $65,000

Gilbert Melendez: $150,000 (no win bonus) def. Tatsuya Kawajiri: $97,612.50

Gegard Mousasi: $150,000 drew Keith Jardine: $25,000

Shinya Aoki: $73,637.50 (no win bonus) def. Lyle Beerbohm: $10,000

Robert Peralta: $4,000 (includes $2,000 win bonus) def. Hiroyuki Takaya: $2,740

Virgil Zwicker: $3,000 ($1,000 win bonus) def. Brett Albee: $1,000

Joe Duarte: $2,000 ($1,000 win bonus) def. Saad Awad: $1,500

Herman Terrado: $1,500 ($500 win bonus) def. A.J. Matthews: $1,000

Rolando Perez: $3,000 ($1,000 win bonus) def. Tom Peterson: $1,000

Casey Ryan: $2,000 ($1,000 win bonus) def. Paul Song: $750
