= Saad Awad =

American mixed martial arts fighter

- Born: June 7, 1983 (age 43); San Bernardino, California, United States
- Other names: Assassin
- Nationality: American
- Height: 5 ft 11 in (1.80 m)
- Weight: 155 lb (70 kg; 11.1 st)
- Division: Welterweight; Lightweight
- Reach: 73.5 in (187 cm)
- Stance: Orthodox
- Fighting out of: San Bernardino, California, United States
- Team: Millennia MMA Gym (2007–2018, 2020); Aguirres FS; The Treigning Lab (2018–2020); Fortis MMA (2020–present)
- Years active: 2006–present

Mixed martial arts record
- Total: 39
- Wins: 24
- By knockout: 11
- By submission: 7
- By decision: 5
- By disqualification: 1
- Losses: 14
- By knockout: 5
- By submission: 3
- By decision: 6
- No contests: 1

Other information
- Mixed martial arts record from Sherdog

Saad Rassam Awad (Arabic: سعد عوض, born June 7, 1983) is an American mixed martial artist competing in the lightweight division. A professional competitor since 2006, Awad has formerly competed for Bellator, Strikeforce and King of the Cage.

== Background ==
Born in San Bernardino, California to a Palestinian father and a Brazilian mother, Awad is the fourth eldest of twelve siblings. Growing up, Awad competed in soccer and wrestling at Cajon High School and later wrestled for a semester at a junior college. Later, Awad stumbled upon mixed martial arts and eventually moved to Las Vegas, Nevada.

== Mixed martial arts career ==
=== Early career ===
Awad started his career in 2006. He fought mainly for the Costa Rican promotion Titans of the Pentagon and for the Californian promotion Gladiator Challenge.

For Titans of the Pentagon, he compiled four victories, winning a four-man tournament on the way.

For Gladiator Challenge, he had his first defeat against Nam Phan on February 16, 2008 at GC 74. Despite having lost his GC debut, Awad won the Gladiator Challenge Lightweight Championship against Kyle Olsen on October 25, 2008 at GC 85.

=== Strikeforce ===
Awad faced Joe Duarte on April 9, 2011 at Strikeforce: Diaz vs. Daley. He lost via submission in the second round.

=== The Ultimate Fighter ===
Awad appeared in the first episode of The Ultimate Fighter: Team Carwin vs. Team Nelson. He lost via unanimous decision against Joey Rivera during the entry round.

=== Bellator MMA ===
Awad made his Bellator MMA debut on January 25, 2009 at Bellator 10 against Diego Garijo. He lost via submission in the first round.

On January 31, 2013 at Bellator 87, Awad was expected to face Jason Fischer. However, he had to replace Patricky Freire in the quarterfinal match of Bellator Season Eight Lightweight Tournament due to a knee injury against Guillaume DeLorenzi. He won via KO 31 seconds into the first round.

In the semifinals, Awad faced Will Brooks on February 28, 2013 at Bellator 91. In a major upset, Awad knocked out the heavily favored Brooks via KO in under a minute once again.

Awad faced David Rickels in the tournament finals at Bellator 94. He lost the fight via TKO due to a highly controversial finish. Rickels dropped Awad with a right hand at the very end of the round, but Awad remained resting on his back instead of getting up to his corner, resulting in the referee declaring an end to the match.

Awad next faced British fighter Martin Stapleton in the quarterfinal match of Bellator season nine lightweight tournament on September 27, 2013 at Bellator 101. He won the fight via submission in the first round.

Awad had a rematch with Will Brooks in the semifinal round on October 25, 2013 at Bellator 105. He lost via unanimous decision (30-27, 30–27, 30-27).

Awad fought Joe Duarte at Bellator 122 in a rematch from their 2011 bout. He won the fight via TKO in the first round where he locked in an arm triangle, and elbowed Duarte. Duarte punched Awad in the head and made him suffer from symptoms of concussion.

Awad faced undefeated Sergio Rios on October 3, 2014 at Bellator 127. He won the fight via unanimous decision.

Awad faced Rob Sinclair at Bellator 136 on April 10, 2015. He won the fight by unanimous decision.

Awad faced Patricky Freire at Bellator 141 on August 28, 2015. He lost the fight by unanimous decision.

Awad moved up to the welterweight division and faced Evangelista Santos at Bellator 154 on May 14, 2016. Awad defeated the veteran via TKO after repeated strikes on the ground while Santos held on to a submission attempt.

Returning to lightweight, Awad faced Derek Anderson at Bellator 160 on August 26, 2016. In a back-and-forth affair, in which both fighters traded near submission finishes, Awad ultimately lost the fight via unanimous decision.

Awad again moved up to the welterweight division and faced Brennan Ward at Bellator 163 on November 4, 2016. He lost the fight via knockout in the first round.

Awad faced Ryan Quinn at Bellator 178 on April 21, 2017. He won the back-and-forth fight via unanimous decision.

Awad faced Zach Freeman at Bellator 186 on November 3, 2017. He won the fight via TKO in the first round.

Awad faced J.J. Ambrose at Bellator 193 on January 26, 2018. He won the fight via unanimous decision.

Awad fought Ryan Couture at Bellator 201 on June 29, 2018, winning the fight via technical knockout.

Awad faced Benson Henderson at Bellator 208 on October 13, 2018. He lost the fight by unanimous decision.

As the first bout of his new contract with Bellator, Awad faced Goiti Yamauchi at Bellator 229 on October 4, 2019. He lost the fight via a verbal submission due to an armbar in the first round.

Awad stepped in as a short-notice replacement for Sabah Homasi against Paul Daley at Bellator 232 on October 26, 2019. He lost the fight via TKO in the second round.

Awad then faced Mandel Nallo at Bellator 249 on October 15, 2020. Nallo kneed Awad in the groin rendering him unable to continue the bout, leading to a no contest.

Awad faced Nate Andrews on May 21, 2021 at Bellator 259 He won the bout via TKO in the first round after dropping Andrews multiple times, leading to the referee calling the bout.

Awad faced Chris Gonzalez on January 29, 2022 at Bellator 273. He lost the bout via head kick knockout 36 seconds into the first round.

== Personal life ==
Awad and his wife Britni live in Riverside, California with their daughter and son.

== Championships and accomplishments ==
- Bellator Fighting Championships
  - Bellator Season 8 Lightweight Tournament Runner-Up
  - Third most bouts in Bellator history (24)
  - Most losses in Bellator history (11)
- Gladiator Challenge
  - Gladiator Challenge Lightweight Championship (One time)
- Titans of the Pentagon
  - TOTP Four-Man Welterweight Tournament Winner (2007)
- MMAJunkie.com
  - 2019 March Fight of the Month vs. Brandon Girtz

== Mixed martial arts record ==
Professional record breakdown
39 matches	24 wins	14 losses
By knockout	11	5
By submission	7	3
By decision	5	6
By disqualification	1	0
No contests	1	

Res.	Record	Opponent	Method	Event	Date	Round	Time	Location	Notes
Loss	24–14 (1)	Chris Gonzalez	KO (head kick and punches)	Bellator 273	January 29, 2022	1	0:36	Phoenix, Arizona, United States	
Win	24–13 (1)	Nate Andrews	TKO (punches)	Bellator 259	May 21, 2021	1	3:16	Uncasville, Connecticut, United States	
NC	23–13 (1)	Mandel Nallo	NC (accidental low blow)	Bellator 249	October 15, 2020	1	1:44	Uncasville, Connecticut, United States	
Loss	23–13	Paul Daley	TKO (punches)	Bellator 232	October 26, 2019	2	1:30	Uncasville, Connecticut, United States	Catchweight (175 lbs) bout.
Loss	23–12	Goiti Yamauchi	Verbal Submission (armbar)	Bellator 229	October 4, 2019	1	1:40	Temecula, California, United States	
Loss	23–11	Brandon Girtz	Decision (unanimous)	Bellator 219	March 29, 2019	3	5:00	Temecula, California, United States	
Loss	23–10	Benson Henderson	Decision (unanimous)	Bellator 208	October 13, 2018	3	5:00	Uniondale, New York, United States	
Win	23–9	Ryan Couture	TKO (punches)	Bellator 201	June 29, 2018	1	4:29	Temecula, California, United States	
Win	22–9	J.J. Ambrose	Decision (unanimous)	Bellator 193	January 26, 2018	3	5:00	Temecula, California, United States	
Win	21–9	Zach Freeman	TKO (punch)	Bellator 186	November 3, 2017	1	1:07	University Park, Pennsylvania, United States	
Win	20–9	Ryan Quinn	Decision (unanimous)	Bellator 178	April 21, 2017	3	5:00	Uncasville, Connecticut, United States	Catchweight (165 lbs) bout.
Loss	19–9	Brennan Ward	KO (punches)	Bellator 163	November 4, 2016	1	1:26	Uncasville, Connecticut, United States	Welterweight bout.
Loss	19–8	Derek Anderson	Decision (unanimous)	Bellator 160	August 26, 2016	3	5:00	Anaheim, California, United States	
Win	19–7	Evangelista Santos	TKO (punches)	Bellator 154	May 14, 2016	1	4:31	San Jose, California, United States	Welterweight bout.
Loss	18–7	Patricky Freire	Decision (unanimous)	Bellator 141	August 28, 2015	3	5:00	Temecula, California, United States	
Win	18–6	Rob Sinclair	Decision (unanimous)	Bellator 136	April 10, 2015	3	5:00	Irvine, California, United States	
Win	17–6	Sergio Rios	Decision (unanimous)	Bellator 127	October 3, 2014	3	5:00	Temecula, California, United States	
Win	16–6	Joe Duarte	TKO (elbows)	Bellator 122	July 25, 2014	1	1:18	Temecula, California, United States	
Loss	15–6	Will Brooks	Decision (unanimous)	Bellator 105	October 25, 2013	3	5:00	Rio Rancho, New Mexico, United States	Bellator Season Nine Lightweight Tournament Semifinal.
Win	15–5	Martin Stapleton	Submission (rear naked choke)	Bellator 101	September 27, 2013	1	3:46	Portland, Oregon, United States	Bellator Season Nine Lightweight Tournament Quarterfinal.
Loss	14–5	David Rickels	TKO (punches)	Bellator 94	March 28, 2013	2	5:00	Tampa, Florida, United States	Bellator Season Eight Lightweight Tournament Final.
Win	14–4	Will Brooks	KO (punches)	Bellator 91	February 28, 2013	1	0:43	Rio Rancho, New Mexico, United States	Bellator Season Eight Lightweight Tournament Semifinal.
Win	13–4	Guillaume DeLorenzi	KO (punches)	Bellator 87	January 31, 2013	1	0:31	Mount Pleasant, Michigan, United States	Bellator Season Eight Lightweight Tournament Quarterfinal.
Win	12–4	Daniel McWilliams	Submission	IES: Inland Empire Strikes	October 20, 2012	1	1:16	Ontario, California, United States	
Win	11–4	Matt Shorey	TKO (punches)	Gladiator Challenge: Star Wars	April 29, 2012	1	0:28	San Jacinto, California, United States	
Win	10–4	Andy Morales	Submission (rear-naked choke)	MEZ Sports: Pandemonium 6	March 3, 2012	2	3:59	Riverside, California, United States	Return to Lightweight.
Win	9–4	Joey Nier	KO (punch)	Gladiator Challenge: Pro-Am Series 2	October 16, 2011	1	0:11	San Jacinto, California, United States	
Loss	8–4	Joe Duarte	Submission (armbar)	Strikeforce: Diaz vs. Daley	April 9, 2011	2	2:45	San Diego, California, United States	Lightweight bout.
Win	8–3	Bryson Kamaka	TKO (punches)	KOTC: Sniper	August 5, 2010	1	0:21	San Bernardino, California, United States	
Loss	7–3	Diego Garijo	Submission (rear-naked choke)	Bellator 10	June 5, 2009	1	4:45	Ontario, California, United States	Lightweight bout.
Loss	7–2	Karen Darabedyan	Decision (split)	Gladiator Challenge: Revolution	January 25, 2009	3	5:00	Los Angeles, California, United States	Welterweight debut.
Win	7–1	Jorge Britto	Decision (majority)	CCF 3: Undisputed	November 28, 2008	2	5:00	Edmonton, Alberta, Canada	
Win	6–1	Kyle Olsen	Submission	GC 85: Cross Fire	October 25, 2008	1	1:14	San Diego, California, United States	Won the Gladiator Challenge Lightweight Championship.
Loss	5–1	Nam Phan	TKO (punches)	GC 74: Evolution	February 16, 2008	2	0:52	Los Angeles, California, United States	
Win	5–0	Evan Vasquez Matus	TKO	TOTP: Titans of the Pentagon	September 22, 2007	1	N/A	San José, Costa Rica	
Win	4–0	Eric Beitia	Submission (guillotine choke)	TOTP: Titans of the Pentagon	July 21, 2007	N/A	N/A	San José, Costa Rica	
Loss	3–0	Ludwing Salazar	KO (punch)	TOTP: Titans of the Pentagon	April 28, 2007	1	4:50	San José, Costa Rica	Won the TOTP Four-Man Welterweight Tournament.
Win	2–0	Wilberth Montoya	Submission (rear-naked choke)	TOTP: Titans of the Pentagon	April 28, 2007	1	1:30	San José, Costa Rica	
Win	1–0	Art Ruiz	DQ	KOTC: The Return	March 19, 2006	1	4:43	San Jacinto, California, United States	

== See also ==
- List of male mixed martial artists
