= Ricky Rainey =

American mixed martial arts fighter

- Born: June 29, 1983 (age 43); Gastonia, North Carolina, U.S.
- Other names: The Sniper
- Nationality: American
- Height: 6 ft 1 in (1.85 m)
- Weight: 170 lb (77 kg; 12 st)
- Division: Middleweight; Welterweight
- Reach: 75 1/2 in (192 cm)
- Fighting out of: Charlotte, North Carolina, U.S.
- Team: Gym-O
- Years active: 2011–2019

Mixed martial arts record
- Total: 19
- Wins: 13
- By knockout: 7
- By submission: 1
- By decision: 5
- Losses: 6
- By knockout: 4
- By decision: 2

Other information
- Mixed martial arts record from Sherdog

Ricky Rainey (born June 29, 1983) is an American mixed martial artist. A professional competitor since 2011, Rainey has previously competed for Bellator and in the UFC's Welterweight division.

== Mixed martial arts career ==
=== Early career ===
After compiling a 5-0 amateur record, Rainey made his professional mixed martial arts debut in August 2011. By September 2013, he held an 8–2 record competing for various promotions, most notably Xtreme Fighting Championships. After a loss to Dhiego Lima, Rainey signed with Bellator MMA.

=== Bellator MMA ===
On April 11, 2014, Rainey made his debut for Bellator against Andy Murad at Bellator 116. He won the fight in the first round via TKO.

Rainey faced undefeated Michael Page on Bellator's inaugural pay-per-view, Bellator 120, on May 17, 2014. He lost the fight via TKO in the first round.

Rainey faced Johnny Cisneros on October 3, 2014, at Bellator 127. He won the fight via TKO in the first round.

Rainey faced Jesse Juarez on May 15, 2015, at Bellator 137. He won the fight via knockout in the second round.

Rainey faced Chidi Njokuani at Bellator 146 on November 20, 2015. He lost the fight via unanimous decision.

Rainey faced Gilbert Smith at Bellator 162 on October 21, 2016. He won the fight via unanimous decision.

Rainey faced Marc Stevens at Bellator 182 on August 25, 2017. He won the fight by unanimous decision.

=== Ultimate Fighting Championship ===
Rainey faced Muslim Salikhov on April 14, 2018, at UFC on Fox 29, replacing Abdul Razak Alhassan who was removed from the card due to injury. He lost the fight via knockout in round two.

Rainey faced Tim Means on November 30, 2018, at The Ultimate Fighter 28 Finale. He lost the fight via a technical knockout in round one.

Rainey was released by UFC in July 2019.

== Professional kickboxing ==
Since last competing in MMA, Rainey fought twice in professional kickboxing in 2020, going 1-1.

== Mixed martial arts record ==
Professional record breakdown
19 matches	13 wins	6 losses
By knockout	7	4
By submission	1	0
By decision	5	2
Draws	0	

Res.	Record	Opponent	Method	Event	Date	Round	Time	Location	Notes
Loss	13–6	Tim Means	TKO (punches)	The Ultimate Fighter: Heavy Hitters Finale	November 30, 2018	1	1:18	Las Vegas, Nevada, United States	
Loss	13–5	Muslim Salikhov	KO (punches)	UFC on Fox: Poirier vs. Gaethje	April 14, 2018	2	4:12	Glendale, Arizona, United States	
Win	13–4	Marc Stevens	Decision (unanimous)	Bellator 182	August 25, 2017	3	5:00	Verona, New York, United States	
Win	12–4	Gilbert Smith	Decision (unanimous)	Bellator 162	October 21, 2016	3	5:00	Memphis, Tennessee, United States	
Loss	11–4	Chidi Njokuani	Decision (unanimous)	Bellator 146	November 20, 2015	3	5:00	Thackerville, Oklahoma, United States	
Win	11–3	Jesse Juarez	KO (knee)	Bellator 137	May 15, 2015	2	1:13	Temecula, California, United States	
Win	10–3	Johnny Cisneros	TKO (knee and punches)	Bellator 127	October 3, 2014	1	3:18	Temecula, California, United States	Catchweight (177 lbs) bout.
Loss	9–3	Michael Page	TKO (punch)	Bellator 120	May 17, 2014	1	4:29	Southaven, Mississippi, United States	
Win	9–2	Andy Murad	TKO (punches)	Bellator 116	April 11, 2014	1	1:11	Temecula, California, United States	Catchweight (180 lbs) bout; Murad missed weight.
Loss	8–2	Dhiego Lima	Decision (split)	XFC 25: Boiling Point	September 6, 2013	3	5:00	Albuquerque, New Mexico, United States	
Win	8–1	Reggie Peña	TKO (punches)	XFC 24: Collision Course	June 14, 2013	1	4:33	Tampa, Florida, United States	Middleweight bout.
Win	7–1	Alex Rojas	Decision (unanimous)	FLP 31: Fight Lab 31	May 4, 2013	3	5:00	Charlotte, North Carolina, United States	
Win	6–1	Joseph Corneroli	Decision (unanimous)	XFC 22: Crossing the Line	February 22, 2013	3	5:00	Charlotte, North Carolina, United States	
Win	5–1	Donald Wallace	TKO (knee and punches)	XFC 21: Night of Champions II	December 7, 2012	1	1:42	Nashville, Tennessee, United States	
Loss	4–1	Johnny Buck	KO (punches)	XFC 19: Charlotte Showdown	August 3, 2012	2	1:32	Charlotte, North Carolina, United States	Welterweight debut.
Win	4–0	Patrick Mandio	Decision (unanimous)	Wild Bill's Fight Night 44	March 9, 2012	3	5:00	Duluth, Georgia, United States	
Win	3–0	Elder Ramos	TKO (punches)	AMMAFL 4: Fight Night	February 17, 2012	1	3:52	Newtown, Pennsylvania, United States	
Win	2–0	Tommy Jones	Submission (rear-naked choke)	Wild Bill's Fight Night 41	November 5, 2011	3	2:46	Duluth, Georgia, United States	
Win	1–0	John Constantonus	KO (punch)	Fight Lab 16: MMA Cage Fights	August 6, 2011	1	3:26	Charlotte, North Carolina, United States	
