= Augusto Sakai =

Brazilian mixed martial artist

- Born: Augusto dos Santos Sakai; 19 May 1991 (age 35); Curitiba, Paraná, Brazil
- Height: 6 ft 4 in (193 cm)
- Weight: 265 lb (120 kg; 18 st 13 lb)
- Division: Heavyweight
- Reach: 77 in (196 cm)
- Team: Gile Ribeiro Team (until 2022); Noguchi (until 2022); American Top Team (2022–present)
- Rank: Brown belt in Brazilian Jiu-Jitsu
- Years active: 2011–present

Mixed martial arts record
- Total: 25
- Wins: 17
- By knockout: 11
- By decision: 6
- Losses: 7
- By knockout: 4
- By decision: 3
- Draws: 1

Other information
- Mixed martial arts record from Sherdog

Augusto dos Santos Sakai (born 19 May 1991) is a Brazilian mixed martial artist who formerly competed in the Heavyweight division of the Ultimate Fighting Championship (UFC) and Bellator MMA.

== Mixed martial arts career ==
=== Early career ===
Sakai made his professional MMA debut in October 2011 in his native Brazil. In the first two years of his career, he amassed a record of six wins and no losses with all but one of his wins coming via knockout.

=== Bellator MMA ===
Sakai made his Bellator MMA debut at Bellator 94 in March 2013, defeating Rob Horton by knockout due to a knee.

Sakai returned to the promotion in 2015 with bouts against Daniel Gallemore and Alex Huddleston. He won both fights via TKO.

Sakai faced Dan Charles at Bellator 155 on May 20, 2016. The bout ended in a majority draw.

Sakai faced Cheick Kongo at Bellator 179 on May 19, 2017. He lost the fight via split decision.

=== Ultimate Fighting Championship ===
Sakai made his promotional debut against Chase Sherman on September 22, 2018, at UFC Fight Night 137. He won the fight via TKO in the third round.

Sakai faced Andrei Arlovski on April 27, 2019, at UFC Fight Night: Jacaré vs. Hermansson. He won the fight via split decision.

In his third fight for the promotion, Sakai faced Marcin Tybura on September 14, 2019, at UFC Fight Night 158. He won the fight via knockout in the first round. Subsequently, Sakai signed a new, six-fight contract with the UFC.

Sakai was scheduled to face Blagoy Ivanov on May 9, 2020, at then UFC 250. Due to the event being relocated to the United States, Sakai being unable to compete due to visa issues. However, on April 9, Dana White, the president of UFC announced that this event was postponed and the eventually the bout took place on May 30, 2020, at UFC on ESPN: Woodley vs. Burns. He won the fight via a split decision.

Sakai faced Alistair Overeem on September 5, 2020, at UFC Fight Night 176. Despite his early success, he was eventually dominated by the veteran and lost the fight via technical knockout in the fifth round.

Sakai was expected to face Shamil Abdurakhimov on May 1, 2021, at UFC on ESPN 23. However Abdurakhimov pulled out of the bout with visa issues, and Sakai instead faced Jairzinho Rozenstruik on June 5, 2021, at UFC Fight Night: Rozenstruik vs. Sakai. He lost the fight via knockout with one second left in the first round.

Sakai was expected to face Tai Tuivasa on November 20, 2021, at UFC Fight Night 198. However due to visa issues for Tuivasa, the bout was scrapped. The pair was rescheduled and met on December 11, 2021, at UFC 269. Sakai lost the fight via knockout in the second round.

Sakai faced Serghei Spivac on August 6, 2022, at UFC on ESPN 40. He lost the fight via technical knockout in round two.

Sakai faced Don'Tale Mayes on February 25, 2023, at UFC Fight Night 220. He won the fight via unanimous decision.

In late March 2023, Sakai was released from the UFC.

=== Konfrontacja Sztuk Walki ===
On June 3, 2024 it was announced that Sakai had signed with the Polish promotion KSW. He challenged Phil De Fries for the KSW Heavyweight Championship at KSW 95 on June 7, 2024, losing by unanimous decision.

== Personal life ==
Sakai is the grandson of Japanese immigrants to Brazil. He works at an aquarium store in daily life.

== Mixed martial arts record ==
Professional record breakdown
26 matches	17 wins	8 losses
By knockout	11	4
By decision	6	4
Draws	1	

Res.	Record	Opponent	Method	Event	Date	Round	Time	Location	Notes
Loss	17–8–1	Artur Szpilka	Decision (unanimous)	KSW 120	July 18, 2026	3	5:00	Gdynia, Poland	
Loss	17–7–1	Marcin Wójcik	Decision (unanimous)	KSW 113	December 20, 2025	3	5:00	Łódź, Poland	
Win	17–6–1	Szymon Bajor	Decision (split)	KSW 105	April 26, 2025	3	5:00	Gliwice, Poland	
Loss	16–6–1	Phil De Fries	Decision (unanimous)	KSW 95	June 7, 2024	5	5:00	Olsztyn, Poland	For the KSW Heavyweight Championship.
Win	16–5–1	Don'Tale Mayes	Decision (unanimous)	UFC Fight Night: Muniz vs. Allen	February 25, 2023	3	5:00	Las Vegas, Nevada, United States	
Loss	15–5–1	Serghei Spivac	TKO (punches)	UFC on ESPN: Santos vs. Hill	August 6, 2022	2	3:42	Las Vegas, Nevada, United States	
Loss	15–4–1	Tai Tuivasa	KO (punches)	UFC 269	December 11, 2021	2	0:26	Las Vegas, Nevada, United States	
Loss	15–3–1	Jairzinho Rozenstruik	TKO (punches)	UFC Fight Night: Rozenstruik vs. Sakai	June 5, 2021	1	4:59	Las Vegas, Nevada, United States	
Loss	15–2–1	Alistair Overeem	TKO (elbows and punches)	UFC Fight Night: Overeem vs. Sakai	September 5, 2020	5	0:26	Las Vegas, Nevada, United States	
Win	15–1–1	Blagoy Ivanov	Decision (split)	UFC on ESPN: Woodley vs. Burns	May 30, 2020	3	5:00	Las Vegas, Nevada, United States	
Win	14–1–1	Marcin Tybura	KO (punches)	UFC Fight Night: Cowboy vs. Gaethje	September 14, 2019	1	0:59	Vancouver, British Columbia, Canada	
Win	13–1–1	Andrei Arlovski	Decision (split)	UFC Fight Night: Jacaré vs. Hermansson	April 27, 2019	3	5:00	Sunrise, Florida, United States	
Win	12–1–1	Chase Sherman	TKO (punches)	UFC Fight Night: Santos vs. Anders	September 22, 2018	3	4:03	São Paulo, Brazil	
Win	11–1–1	Marcos Conrado	TKO (punches)	Dana White's Contender Series Brazil 1	August 10, 2018	2	3:09	Las Vegas, Nevada, United States	
Win	10–1–1	Tiago Cardoso	TKO (punches)	Imortal FC 7	November 11, 2017	1	2:17	São José dos Pinhais, Brazil	
Loss	9–1–1	Cheick Kongo	Decision (split)	Bellator 179	May 19, 2017	3	5:00	London, England	
Draw	9–0–1	Dan Charles	Draw (majority)	Bellator 155	May 20, 2016	3	5:00	Boise, Idaho, United States	
Win	9–0	Alex Huddleston	Decision (unanimous)	Bellator 145	November 6, 2015	3	5:00	St. Louis, Missouri, United States	
Win	8–0	Daniel Gallemore	TKO (retirement)	Bellator 139	June 26, 2015	2	5:00	Mulvane, Kansas, United States	
Win	7–0	Matt Frembling	TKO (knees and punches)	Bellator 122	July 25, 2014	3	3:32	Temecula, California, United States	
Win	6–0	Edison Lopes	Decision (unanimous)	Golden Fighters 8	December 12, 2013	3	5:00	Novo Hamburgo, Brazil	
Win	5–0	Rob Horton	KO (knee)	Bellator 94	March 28, 2013	2	4:01	Tampa, Florida, United States	
Win	4–0	Arley Simetti	KO (knee)	Samurai FC 9	December 15, 2012	1	2:04	Curitiba, Brazil	
Win	3–0	Dayvisson Daniel	TKO (punches)	Evolution Fight Combat 3	May 20, 2012	1	0:00	Curitiba, Brazil	
Win	2–0	Marcio Fernando	TKO (punches)	Power Fight Extreme 6	November 19, 2011	1	0:35	Curitiba, Brazil	
Win	1–0	Cesar Alberto	KO (punches)	Adventure Fighters Tournament 1	October 15, 2011	1	1:54	Curitiba, Brazil	Heavyweight debut.

== See also ==
- List of Dana White's Contender Series alumni
- List of male mixed martial artists
