= Chase Gormley =

American MMA fighter

- Born: August 11, 1983 (age 43); Torrance, California, United States
- Height: 6 ft 3 in (1.91 m)
- Weight: 265 lb (120 kg; 18.9 st)
- Division: Heavyweight; Super Heavyweight
- Reach: 77 in (196 cm)
- Stance: Orthodox
- Fighting out of: Los Angeles, California, United States
- Team: Reign MMA
- Years active: 2007–2018

Mixed martial arts record
- Total: 24
- Wins: 14
- By knockout: 4
- By submission: 2
- By decision: 8
- Losses: 9
- By knockout: 7
- By submission: 1
- By decision: 1
- No contests: 1

Other information
- Mixed martial arts record from Sherdog

Chase Gormley (born August 11, 1983) is an American professional mixed martial artist and bare-knuckle boxer, currently competing in the Heavyweight division of the Bare Knuckle Fighting Championship (BKFC). A professional competitor since 2007, he has competed for the UFC, Bellator, the MFC, the RFA, King of the Cage, the XFC, Absolute Championship Berkut, and Titan FC, where he was Heavyweight Champion.

== Background ==
Born and raised in Torrance, California, Gormley began training in MMA at the age of 13. A wrestler at Torrance High School, he continued at Montana State University - Northern, before transferring to Lindenwood University, where he was a NAIA All-American.

== Mixed martial arts career ==
=== Early career ===
Gormley made his professional mixed martial arts debut in April 2007. He defeated his first six opponents, before his stint with the UFC.

=== Ultimate Fighting Championship ===
Gormley was expected to face Ben Rothwell at Affliction: Trilogy on August 1, 2009. However, the bout was moved to UFC 104, on October 24, after Affliction Entertainment ceased operations. As a result of a number of bouts being shuffled, Gormley's opponent was changed to Stefan Struve. Gormley lost the fight due to a triangle choke submission in the first round.

Gormley faced journeyman Brendan Schaub at UFC Live: Vera vs. Jones on March 21, 2010. He lost the fight via TKO in the first round. After the loss to Schaub, he was subsequently released from the UFC.

=== Bellator MMA ===
In July 2015, Bellator revealed that they had signed Gormley to an exclusive, multi-fight contract.

In his promotional debut, Gormley was defeated by Dan Charles at Bellator 143 on September 25, 2015, via knockout in the second round.

Gormley faced Joey Beltran at Bellator 155 on May 20, 2016. He won the fight via split decision.

Gormley faced Bobby Brents at Bellator 162 on October 21, 2016. He won the fight via split decision.

In the last fight of his Bellator contract, Gormley faced Sergei Kharitonov at Bellator 175 on March 31, 2017. He lost the fight via knock out in the first round.

== Bare-knuckle boxing career ==
Gormley made his bare-knuckle boxing debut against Tylor Sijohn on November 23, 2024 at BKFC Fight Night 18. He won the fight by knockout in the second round.

Gormley faced promotional newcomer Parker Porter on February 1, 2025 at BKFC on DAZN 4. He lost the fight by knockout in the first round.

Gormley was scheduled to face Nelson Best on November 15, 2025 at BKFC 84. However, for unknown reasons, the bout was pulled from the card.

Gormley was scheduled to face Anthony Garrett on December 20, 2025 at BKFC Fight Night 33. However, the bout did not take place for unknown reasons.

Gormley faced Levi Costa on May 22, 2026 at BKFC 89. He lost the fight by technical knockout in the first round.

== Personal life ==
Prior to becoming a fighter, Gormley worked as a personal trainer.

== Championships and accomplishments ==
=== Mixed martial arts ===
- Titan Fighting Championship
  - Titan FC Heavyweight Championship (One time)
- Gladiator Challenge
  - Gladiator Challenge Heavyweight Championship (One time)

== Mixed martial arts record ==
Professional record breakdown
24 matches	14 wins	9 losses
By knockout	4	7
By submission	2	1
By decision	8	1
No contests	1	

Res.	Record	Opponent	Method	Event	Date	Round	Time	Location	Notes
Loss	14–9 (1)	Konstantin Andreitsev	KO (punches)	League S-70 - Plotforma S-70: 2018	August 22, 2018	3	2:56	Sochi, Russia	
Loss	14–8 (1)	Tanner Boser	Decision (unanimous)	ACB 88: Barnatt vs. Celiński	June 16, 2018	3	5:00	Brisbane, Australia	
Loss	14–7 (1)	Denis Goltsov	KO (punch)	ACB 77: Abdulvakhabov vs. Vartanyan 2	December 23, 2017	2	2:16	Moscow, Russia	
Loss	14–6 (1)	Sergei Kharitonov	KO (punch)	Bellator 175	March 31, 2017	1	3:55	Rosemont, Illinois, United States	
Win	14–5 (1)	Bobby Brents	Decision (split)	Bellator 162	October 21, 2016	3	5:00	Memphis, Tennessee, United States	
Win	13–5 (1)	Joey Beltran	Decision (split)	Bellator 155	May 20, 2016	3	5:00	Boise, Idaho, United States	
Loss	12–5 (1)	Dan Charles	KO (punch)	Bellator 143	September 25, 2015	2	4:35	Hidalgo, Texas, United States	
Win	12–4 (1)	Jon Madsen	Decision (unanimous)	Titan Fighting Championships 33	March 20, 2015	5	5:00	Mobile, Alabama, United States	Won the inaugural Titan FC Heavyweight Championship. Later vacated the title.
Win	11–4 (1)	Dale Sopi	Decision (unanimous)	RFA 21: Juusola vs. Baghdad	December 5, 2014	3	5:00	Costa Mesa, California, United States	
Win	10–4 (1)	Tony Lopez	TKO (knee injury)	LOP: Chaos at the Casino 5	August 10, 2014	3	4:21	Inglewood, California, United States	
Win	9–4 (1)	Abdumonim Adoli	TKO (punches)	Gladiator Fighting Championship 6	May 30, 2014	1	0:38	Kuwait City, Kuwait	Openweight bout.
Win	8–4 (1)	Brandon Sayles	Decision (unanimous)	XFC 16: High Stakes	February 10, 2012	3	5:00	Knoxville, Tennessee, United States	Super Heavyweight bout.
Loss	7–4 (1)	Beau Tribolet	TKO (punches)	Superior Cage Combat 2	August 20, 2011	1	2:40	Las Vegas, Nevada, United States	
NC	7–3 (1)	Maurice Jackson	NC	Superior Cage Combat 1	May 21, 2011	1	2:59	Las Vegas, Nevada, United States	
Loss	7–3	Mike Whitehead	TKO (punches)	IFC: Extreme Challenge	July 10, 2010	4	4:34	Mt. Pleasant, Michigan, United States	For the IFC Heavyweight Championship.
Win	7–2	Ryan Fortin	Decision (unanimous)	MFC 25: Vindication	May 7, 2010	3	5:00	Edmonton, Alberta, Canada	
Loss	6–2	Brendan Schaub	TKO (punches)	UFC Live: Vera vs. Jones	March 21, 2010	1	0:47	Broomfield, Colorado, United States	
Loss	6–1	Stefan Struve	Submission (triangle choke)	UFC 104	October 24, 2009	1	4:04	Los Angeles, California, United States	
Win	6–0	Eric Pele	Decision (unanimous)	MFC 16: Anger Management	May 9, 2008	3	5:00	Edmonton, Alberta, Canada	
Win	5–0	Rick Cheek	Submission (Americana)	GC 73: High Noon	December 22, 2007	2	2:20	Sacramento, California, United States	Won the Gladiator Challenge heavyweight championship.
Win	4–0	Brandon Tarns	TKO (punches)	GC 69: Bad Intentions	September 22, 2007	1	N/A	Sacramento, California, United States	
Win	3–0	Adolfo de la Torre	TKO (strikes)	COF 9: Durango	August 25, 2007	1	N/A	N/A	
Win	2–0	John Devine	Submission (toe hold)	GC 66: Battle Ground	July 27, 2007	3	N/A	San Francisco, California, United States	
Win	1–0	Jon Murphy	Decision (unanimous)	KOTC: Sinister	April 27, 2007	2	5:00	San Jacinto, California, United States	

== Bare-knuckle record ==
Professional record breakdown
3 matches	1 win	2 losses
By knockout	1	2

Res.	Record	Opponent	Method	Event	Date	Round	Time	Location	Notes
Loss	1–2	Levi Costa	TKO (punches)	BKFC 89	May 22, 2026	1	1:38	Thousand Palms, California, United States	
Loss	1–1	Parker Porter	TKO	BKFC on DAZN Mohegan Sun: Lane vs. VanCamp	February 1, 2025	1	0:44	Uncasville, Connecticut, United States	
Win	1–0	Tylor Sijohn	TKO	BKFC Fight Night Los Angeles: Warr vs. Khanakov	November 23, 2024	2	0:54	Los Angeles, California, United States	
