= Andy Murad =

American mixed martial arts fighter

- Born: Detroit, Michigan, U.S.
- Other names: The Tooth
- Height: 5 ft 9 in (1.75 m)
- Weight: 70.8 lb (32.1 kg; 5.06 st)
- Division: Light Heavyweight; Middleweight; Welterweight
- Reach: 69.690 in (177 cm)
- Fighting out of: El Cajon, California, U.S.
- Team: Und1sputed FitnASS and Training Center; 10th Planet Jiu-Jitsu Spring Valley
- Years active: 2003-santa

Mixed martial arts record
- Total: 19
- Wins: 16
- By knockout: 4
- By submission: 5
- By decision: 7
- Losses: 3
- By knockout: 2
- By decision: 1

Other information
- Mixed martial arts record from Sherdog

Andy Murad is an American mixed martial artist currently competing in the Welterweight division of Bellator MMA. A professional competitor since 2003, he has also formerly competed for King of the Cage.

== Early life and education ==
Born in Detroit, Michigan, Murad moved to San Diego County, California at a young age. Murad competing in high school wrestling before picking up Brazilian jiu-jitsu under the tutelage of Dean Lister. Murad then began competing in Muay Thai before making the transition to mixed martial arts.

== Mixed martial arts career ==
=== Early career ===
Murad made his professional debut with King of the Cage in the summer of 2003, winning via first-round TKO. He then compiled a record of 6-0 before being signed by Bellator.

=== Bellator MMA ===
Murad made his promotional debut at Bellator 99 against Gavin Sterritt on September 13, 2013 in a Catchweight bout of 173 lbs. Murad was handed his first professional defeat via split decision.

Murad then faced Ricky Rainey in a Catchweight of 180 lbs. at Bellator 116 on April 16, 2014. He lost via first-round TKO.

After taking winning his next two fights outside of the promotion and capturing the Gladiator Challenge Middleweight Championship, Murad made his Bellator return at Bellator 131 against Bubba Pugh on November 15, 2014. He won via split decision.

Murad won his next four fights (three submission and one TKO) before returning at Bellator 160 on August 26, 2016 against Johnny Cisneros in a Catchweight of 175 lbs. He won via unanimous decision.

== Mixed martial arts record ==
Professional record breakdown
18 matches	15 wins	3 losses
By knockout	4	2
By submission	5	0
By decision	6	1

Res.	Record	Opponent	Method	Event	Date	Round	Time	Location	Notes
Loss	16-3	Ed Ruth	TKO (punches)	Bellator 201	June 29, 2018	2	4:59	Temecula, California, United States	Welterweight debut.
Win	16-2	Idrees Wasi	Submission (choke)	Gladiator Challenge: Fight Fest	June 17, 2017	1	2:28	El Cajon, California, United States	Middleweight bout.
Win	15-2	Johnny Cisneros	Decision (unanimous)	Bellator 160	August 26, 2016	3	5:00	Anaheim, California, United States	Catchweight (175 lbs) bout.
Win	14-2	Jamiah Williamson	Submission (keylock)	Gladiator Challenge: Freedom Strikes	July 23, 2016	2	1:14	El Cajon, California, United States	
Win	13-2	Chad Herrick	Decision (unanimous)	KOP 49	June 11, 2016	3	5:00	Grand Rapids, Michigan, United States	Return to Light Heavyweight.
Win	12-2	Marquise Spears	Submission (front choke)	Gladiator Challenge: MMA Smackdown	April 2, 2016	2	2:12	El Cajon, California, United States	
Win	11-2	Matt McOmie	TKO (punches)	Gladiator Challenge: Champions	October 24, 2015	1	1:21	El Cajon, California, United States	
Win	10-2	Roman Bellow	Submission (triangle choke)	Gladiator Challenge: Warrior's	March 7, 2015	1	0:36	El Cajon, California, United States	
Win	9-2	Bubba Pugh	Decision (split)	Bellator 131	November 15, 2014	3	5:00	San Diego, California, United States	
Win	8-2	Brandon Collins	Decision (unanimous)	Gladiator Challenge: Battle Ready	August 23, 2014	3	5:00	El Cajon, California, United States	Won Gladiator Challenge Middleweight Championship.
Win	7-2	Daniel McWilliams	TKO (punches)	Gladiator Challenge: Backlash	May 31, 2014	3	2:47	El Cajon, California, United States	
Loss	6-2	Ricky Rainey	TKO (punches)	Bellator CXVI	April 11, 2014	1	1:11	Temecula, California, United States	Catchweight (180 lbs) bout.
Loss	6-1	Gavin Sterritt	Decision (split)	Bellator XCIX	September 13, 2013	3	5:00	Temecula, California, United States	Catchweight (173 lbs) bout.
Win	6-0	Justin Carr	Submission (reverse triangle choke)	Xplode Fight Series: Devastation	May 18, 2013	1	0:35	Valley Center, California, United States	
Win	5-0	Tsuyoshi Holder	Decision (split)	Xplode Fight Series: Vengeance	January 19, 2013	3	5:00	Valley Center, California, United States	
Win	4-0	Mark McCaw	TKO (punches)	NFC: Native Fighting Championship 11	January 20, 2012	3	1:15	Campo, California, United States	
Win	3-0	Mike Lemaire	Decision (unanimous)	KOTC: Legends	June 6, 2009	3	5:00	Winterhaven, California, United States	
Win	2-0	Ray Lizama	Decision (majority)	KOTC 39: Hitmaster	August 6, 2004	2	5:00	San Jacinto, California, United States	
Win	1-0	Saldana Clemente	TKO (punches)	KOTC 27: Aftermath	August 10, 2003	1	1:25	San Jacinto, California, United States	

== See also ==
- List of male mixed martial artists
