= 2016 in Bellator MMA =

Mixed martial arts events

Information
- Promotion: Bellator MMA
- First date aired: January 29, 2016
- Last date aired: December 16, 2016

2016 in Bellator MMA was the eighth year in the history of Bellator MMA, a mixed martial arts promoter based in the United States. Bellator held 23 events in 2016.

== Background ==
2016 is notable for the launch of sibling promotion Bellator Kickboxing, which would debut on the night of Bellator 152 on April 16 and be taped for broadcast on Spike TV on April 22.

== Bellator 148 ==
Bellator 148: Daley vs. Uhrich
- Date: January 29, 2016
- Venue: Save Mart Center
- City: Fresno, California
- Attendance: 5,425
- Total gate: $267,809

Bellator 148: Daley vs. Uhrich took place January 29, 2016, at the Save Mart Center in Fresno, California. The event aired live in prime time on Spike TV.

Background

The main event was a Welterweight fight between Paul Daley and Andy Uhrich.

The event was expected to be headlined by a welterweight bout between UFC veteran Josh Koscheck and Matt Secor. However Koscheck pulled out of the bout due to an injury. As a result, Paul Daley vs. Andy Uhrich was elevated to the main event

Also on the card Paul Bradley faces Chris Honeycutt in a rematch. Bradley and Honeycutt first squared off at Bellator 140, where their bout ended in a no contest in the second round due to an accidental clash of heads opening a cut on Bradley that forced a stoppage.

Results

Fight card
Weight class				Method	Round	Time	Notes
Welterweight	Paul Daley	def.	Andy Uhrich	KO (punch)	1	2:00
Welterweight	Paul Bradley	def.	Chris Honeycutt	TKO (punches)	1	0:40
Lightweight	Patricky Freire	def.	Ryan Couture	KO (punch)	1	3:00
Heavyweight	Tony Johnson	def.	Raphael Butler	TKO (punches)	3	4:24
Preliminary card (Spike.com)
Featherweight	Justin Smitley	def.	Art Arciniega	Decision (unanimous) (30-27, 30-27, 30-27)	3	5:00
Women's Flyweight	Ilima-Lei Macfarlane	def.	Amber Tackett	Submission (armbar)	1	2:09
Heavyweight	Carl Seumanutafa	def.	Javy Ayala	TKO (punches)	2	3:46
Postliminary card (Dark Bouts)
Bantamweight	Josh San Diego	def.	Paul Ruiz	Decision (unanimous) (29-28, 29-28, 29-28)	3	5:00
Flyweight	Matt Perez	def.	Eugene Cancino	Decision (split) (29-28, 29-28, 28-29)	3	5:00
Featherweight	Te Edwards	def.	Nick Bustamante	KO (punch)	1	0:43
Light Heavyweight	Jermaine McDermott	def.	Eric Huggins	Submission (kimura)	1	1:53

== Bellator 149 ==
Bellator 149: Shamrock vs. Gracie III
- Date: February 19, 2016
- Venue: Toyota Center
- City: Houston, Texas
- Attendance: 14,209
- Total gate: $1,388,951

Bellator 149: Shamrock vs. Gracie III took place February 19, 2016, at the Toyota Center in Houston, Texas. The event aired live in prime time on Spike TV, drawing an average 2.0 million viewers.

Background

The main event and co-main event of Bellator 149 were announced on the air during Bellator 145. President Scott Coker announced the main event fight would feature trilogy bout between combat sports legends Ken Shamrock and Royce Gracie. Gracie initially beat Shamrock in fifty-seven seconds via rear-naked choke at their first meeting at UFC 1 in 1993. Subsequent to that bout, the duo fought to a thirty-six minute draw at UFC 5 in 1995.

The co-main event featured a heavyweight bout between former Miami-Dade County street fighters Kevin Ferguson, aka "Kimbo Slice" and Dhafir Harris, aka "Dada 5000"

During intermission after the Kimbo Slice vs. Dada 5000 fight and shortly before the Ken Shamrock vs. Royce Gracie bout, Bellator MMA ring announcer Michael C. Williams announced to the live Toyota Center crowd that the attendance was 14,209. Thus making Bellator 149 the largest attended show in Bellator MMA history, beating out Bellator MMA & Glory: Dynamite 1 previous live attendance of 11,732.

Following the event it was announced that both Ken Shamrock and Kimbo Slice had failed their pre-fight drug tests. Shamrock tested positive for the anabolic steroid nandrolone, the opioid methadone, and an elevated (T/E) ratio of 12.4:1. Meanwhile, Slice also tested positive for nandrolone and having an elevated (T/E) ratio of 6.4:1. The maximum allowed (T/E) ratio by both the Texas Department of Licensing and Regulation and the World Anti-Doping Agency is 4:1. On May 2, 2016, it was revealed that Slice had settled with the Texas Athletic Commission with a fine of $2,500 and a revoking of his license in the state of Texas. The result of the bout has also been changed to a no contest.

Results

Fight card
Weight class				Method	Round	Time	Notes
Light Heavyweight	Royce Gracie	def.	Ken Shamrock	TKO (knee and punches)	1	2:22
Heavyweight	Kimbo Slice	vs.	Dada 5000	No Contest (overturned)	3	1:32	(Note: Originally ruled a KO (punches) victory at 1:32 of round 3 for Slice; result changed to "No Contest" after Slice tested positive for nandrolone and an elevated (T/E) ratio of 6.4:1.)
Lightweight	Derek Campos	def.	Melvin Guillard	TKO (punches)	2	0:32
Light Heavyweight	Linton Vassell	def.	Emanuel Newton	Decision (unanimous) (30-26, 29-27, 29-27)	3	5:00
Catchweight (150 lb)	Emmanuel Sanchez	def.	Daniel Pineda	Decision (split) (28-29, 29-27, 29-28)	3	5:00
Preliminary card (Spike.com)
Middleweight	Isaac Villanueva	def.	Richard Knepp	TKO (punches)	1	0:42
Featherweight	Jeremy Mahon	def.	Davis Sylvester	TKO (punches)	2	4:22
Featherweight	Adrian Yañez	def.	Ryan Hollis	Decision (unanimous) (29-28, 29-28, 29-28)	3	5:00
Lightweight	Jason Langellier	def.	Anthony Ivy	Submission (anaconda choke)	1	2:09
Heavyweight	Justin Wren	def.	Juan Torres	Decision (unanimous) (30-27, 30-27, 30-27)	3	5:00
Catchweight (130 lb)	Mike Trinh	def.	Joe Zamora	Submission (armbar)	1	3:49
Middleweight	Clovis Hancock	def.	Ruben Esparza	Submission (rear-naked choke)	3	1:26
Bantamweight	Manny Lozoya	def.	Jake Norsworthy	Submission (guillotine choke)	1	2:33
Postliminary card (Dark Bouts)
Bantamweight	Leomana Martinez	def.	Casey Jones	TKO (punches)	1	1:21	(Note: Amateur bout)
Flyweight	Chris Soliz	def.	Alex Macedo	Decision (unanimous)	3	3:00	(Note: Amateur bout)
Flyweight	Shawn Solis	def.	Jonathan Davis	Decision (unanimous)	3	3:00	(Note: Amateur bout)
Lightweight	Ricardo Deluque	def.	Hunter Scott-Gregg	Submission (rear-naked choke)	1	N/A	(Note: Amateur bout)

== Bellator 150 ==
Bellator 150: Kongo vs. Spartan
- Date: February 26, 2016
- Venue: Kansas Star Casino
- City: Mulvane, Kansas
- Attendance: 3,288
- Total gate: $215,185

Bellator 150: Kongo vs. Spartan took place February 26, 2016, at the Kansas Star Casino in Mulvane, Kansas. The event aired live in prime time on Spike TV.

Background

The event was expected to be headlined by a rematch between Marcos Galvão and Eduardo Dantas for the Bellator Bantamweight Championship. The bantamweight title rematch was originally scheduled for Bellator 144, but was postponed when Dantas was forced to withdraw after suffering a rib injury in training. Dantas defeated Galvão via second-round knockout in their first meeting at Bellator 89 when “Dudu” was the promotion's reigning 135-pound champ. However, due to an illness throughout the week leading to the fight, Galvão was pulled from the card the day of the weigh ins.

The co-main event featured local favorite David Rickels facing off against Bobby Cooper.

Results

Fight card
Weight class				Method	Round	Time	Notes
Heavyweight	Cheick Kongo	def.	Vinicius Queiroz	Decision (split) (30-27, 28-29, 29-28)	3	5:00
Lightweight	David Rickels	def.	Bobby Cooper	TKO (knee and punches)	1	3:49
Middleweight	Kendall Grove	def.	Francisco France	KO (punches)	2	0:35
Featherweight	Chuka Willis	def.	Gastón Reyno	Decision (unanimous) (29-28, 30-27, 30-27)	3	5:00
Women's Flyweight	Rebecca Ruth	def.	Lena Ovchynnikova	Decision (unanimous) (29-28, 30-27, 29-28)	3	5:00
Preliminary card (Spike.com)
Lightweight	Henry Lindsay	def.	Marcio Navarro	TKO (punches)	1	2:30
Middleweight	Chris Harris	def.	Julian Marquez	Decision (unanimous) (29-28, 30-27, 30-27)	3	5:00
Welterweight	André Fialho	def.	Manny Meraz	KO (punches)	1	0:29
Middleweight	Gregory Babene	def.	Brandon Farran	Submission (rear-naked choke)	1	3:37
Featherweight	Thai Clark	def.	Deron Carlis	Decision (unanimous) (29-28, 29-28, 29-28)	3	5:00
Heavyweight	Kyle Noblitt	def.	David Hammons	KO (punches)	1	0:45

== Bellator 151 ==
Bellator 151: Warren vs. Caldwell
- Date: March 4, 2016
- Venue: WinStar World Casino
- City: Thackerville, Oklahoma
- Attendance: 1,152
- Total gate: $103,710

Bellator 151: Warren vs. Caldwell took place March 4, 2016, at the WinStar World Casino in Thackerville, Oklahoma. The event aired live in prime time on Spike TV.

Background

The event was headlined by a Bantamweight bout between Joe Warren and undefeated rising star Darrion Caldwell. A former two-division champion, Warren has won six of his last seven fights in Bellator MMA. The 39-year-old last appeared at Bellator 143 on Sept. 25, when he captured a unanimous verdict against L.C. Davis. The 27-year-old Caldwell is 8–0 in his burgeoning career, including five triumphs under the Bellator banner. In his last outing, the former NCAA national champion wrestler choked out Shawn Bunch inside of a round at Bellator 143.

Michael Page was originally scheduled to face Fernando Gonzalez at this event but was pulled out of the bout in early February 2016. He was replaced by Resurrection Fighting Alliance welterweight champion Gilbert Smith.

Results

Fight card
Weight class				Method	Round	Time	Notes
Bantamweight	Darrion Caldwell	def.	Joe Warren	Technical Submission (rear-naked choke)	1	3:23
Welterweight	Fernando Gonzalez	def.	Gilbert Smith	Decision (split) (28-29, 29-28, 29-28)	3	5:00
Featherweight	Bubba Jenkins	def.	Goiti Yamauchi	Decision (unanimous) (29-28, 30-27, 29-27)	3	5:00
Bantamweight	Joe Taimanglo	def.	Sirwan Kakai	Decision (unanimous) (29-28, 29-28, 29-28)	3	5:00
Preliminary card (Spike.com)
Featherweight	Treston Thomison	def.	Aaron Roberson	Submission (guillotine choke)	2	2:20
Middleweight	Jermayne Barnes	def.	Derek Palmer	Submission (punches)	2	1:17
Welterweight	Neiman Gracie	def.	Roger Carroll	Decision (unanimous) (30-26, 30-27, 30-27)	3	5:00
Bantamweight	Ricky Turcios	def.	Steve Garcia	Decision (split) (29-27, 28-29, 30-27)	3	5:00
Welterweight	Justin Patterson	def.	Chance Rencountre	Decision (split) (29-28, 28-29, 29-28)	3	5:00
Catchweight (153 lb)	Ray Wood	def.	Chris Jones	TKO (strikes)	1	3:10

== Bellator 152 ==
Bellator 152: Italy
- Date: April 16, 2016
- Venue: Pala Alpitour
- City: Torino, Italy
- Attendance: 13,867
- Total gate: 907,758€ (ITL) $1,027,536 (USD)

Bellator 152: Italy took place April 16, 2016, at the Pala Alpitour in Torino, Italy. The event aired on Spike TV.

Background

The event was announced in Paris by Bellator MMA President Scott Coker joined by Oktagon Kickboxing President Carlo Di Blasi a co-promoted event set to take place on April 16 at the Pala Alpitour in Torino, Italy.

Bellator 152 was followed by "Bellator Kickboxing: Torino”, the debut event of Bellator Kickboxing. The event would be televised on Friday, April 22 on Spike TV, following their broadcast of Bellator 153.

Results

Fight card
Weight class				Method	Round	Time	Notes
Lightweight	Patricky Freire	def.	Kevin Souza	Decision (unanimous) (30-27, 30-27, 30-27)	3	5:00
Light Heavyweight	Alessio Sakara	def.	Brian Rogers	KO (punches)	2	2:29
Featherweight	A.J. McKee	def.	Danilo Belluardo	TKO (punches)	1	2:44
Women's Catchweight (130 lb)	Anastasia Yankova	def.	Anjela Pink	Submission (armbar)	1	1:35
Featherweight	Daniele Scatizzi	def.	Daniele Miceli	TKO (punches)	1	3:20
Bellator Kickboxing 1 bouts
Middleweight (Kickboxing)	Alexandru Negrea	def.	Melvin Manhoef	Decision (unanimous) (30-25, 29-26, 29-26)	3	3:00
165-Pound (Kickboxing)	Karim Ghajji	def.	Mustapha Haida	Decision (split) (50-45, 50-45, 46-48)	5	3:00	(Note: For the Inaugural Bellator Kickboxing Welterweight Championship)
Welterweight (Kickboxing)	Raymond Daniels	def.	Francesco Moricca	TKO (liver kick)	1	0:30
Bantamweight (Kickboxing)	Kevin Ross	def.	Matteo Taccini	Decisión (unanimous) (29-28, 30-27, 30-27)	3	3:00
Women's Flyweight (Kickboxing)	Denise Kielholtz	def.	Veronica Vernocchi	Decision (split) (28-29, 30-27, 30-27)	3	3:00

== Bellator 153 ==
Bellator 153: Koreshkov vs. Henderson
- Date: April 22, 2016
- Venue: Mohegan Sun Arena
- City: Uncasville, Connecticut
- Attendance: 9,043
- Total gate: $687,269

Bellator 153: Koreshkov vs. Henderson took place April 22, 2016, at the Mohegan Sun Arena in Uncasville, Connecticut. The event aired live in prime time on Spike TV.

Background

The event was headlined by a Welterweight Championship match between current champion Andrey Koreshkov and former UFC and WEC lightweight champion Benson Henderson. The 32-year-old Henderson recently ended a 14-fight run with the UFC by signing a multi-fight deal with Bellator MMA. A longtime 155-pounder, Henderson recorded back-to-back wins as a welterweight in 2015. Also on the card is the Bellator debut of Evangelista Santos taking on long time contender Brennan Ward.

Former Bellator Featherweight Champion Patrício Pitbull was originally scheduled to face John Macapá. who had to pull out of the evening's co-feature bout with a broken rib.

Results

Fight card
Weight class				Method	Round	Time	Notes
Welterweight	Andrey Koreshkov (c)	def.	Benson Henderson	Decision (unanimous) (50-45, 50-45, 50-45)	5	5:00	(Note: For the Bellator Welterweight Championship.)
Featherweight	Patrício Pitbull	def.	Henry Corrales	Submission (guillotine choke)	2	4:09
Welterweight	Evangelista Santos	def.	Brennan Ward	Verbal Submission (heel hook)	1	0:30
Lightweight	Brent Primus	def.	Gleristone Santos	Decision (split) (28-29, 29-28, 29-28)	3	5:00
Welterweight	Michael Page	def.	Jeremie Holloway	Submission (Estima lock)	1	2:15
Preliminary card (Spike.com)
Featherweight	Matt Bessette	def.	Keith Richardson	TKO (doctor stoppage)	2	3:14
Catchweight (195 lb)	Mike Zichelle	def.	Joe Cronin	Submission (rear-naked choke)	1	1:25
Welterweight	Chris Honeycutt	def.	Matt Secor	Decision (unanimous) (30-25, 30-27, 30-27)	3	5:00
Welterweight	Djamil Chan	def.	Richard Patishnock	KO (punch)	1	3:09
Catchweight (150 lb)	Chris Foster	def.	Vovka Clay	Decision (unanimous) (29-28, 29-28, 29-28)	3	5:00
Lightweight	Sam Watford	def.	Dean Hancock	Submission (armbar)	1	1:44
Middleweight	Tim Caron	def.	Justin Sumter	TKO (strikes)	2	3:38
Bantamweight	Blair Tugman	def.	Jay Perrin	Decision (split) (30-27, 27-30, 29-28)	3	5:00

== Bellator 154 ==
Bellator 154: Davis vs. King Mo
- Date: May 14, 2016
- Venue: SAP Center
- City: San Jose, California
- Attendance: 11,084
- Total gate: $984,552

Bellator 154: Davis vs. King Mo is a mixed martial arts event held on May 14, 2016, at the SAP Center in San Jose, California, USA. The event was aired live in prime time on Spike TV.

Background

Davis vs. King Mo was announced during Bellator 149 in Houston. The two men were supposed to face each other in the finals of the Bellator MMA & Glory: Dynamite 1 light heavyweight one-night tournament back in September, but "King Mo" sustained a hip injury after winning in the first round. Former UFC star Phil Davis won the tournament at Dynamite by submitting Emanuel Newton and knocked out reserve fighter Francis Carmont. Davis was originally scheduled to challenge light heavyweight champion Liam McGeary, but McGeary was injured. Lawal won the two-night, eight-man tournament at Rizin Fighting Federation on New Year's Eve in Japan. He knocked out Brett McDermott in the first round, beat Teodoras Aukstuolis in the semifinals by unanimous decision and knocked out Jiri Prochazka in the final. The winner of the main event will challenge for the title against the current champion.

Former Bellator Lightweight Champion Michael Chandler was scheduled to face former Strikeforce Lightweight Champion Josh Thomson in a lightweight bout. However, on May 2, it was announced that Thomson pulled out of the bout due to an undisclosed injury. As a result, Chandler was pulled from the card altogether.

Jordan Parsons was scheduled to face Adam Piccolotti in a featherweight bout on this card. That fight was cancelled after Parsons was involved in a hit-and-run accident that left him hospitalized before he died on May 4, 2016.

Sergei Kharitonov was scheduled to make his debut on this card against Josh Appelt. However, on May 11, Kharitonov withdrew from the bout due to illness. As a result, Appelt was also removed from the card.

Darren Uyenoyama was scheduled to fight on this card against Alvin Cacdac but required medical testing revealed a condition that would not allow Darren to compete.

Results

Fight card
Weight class				Method	Round	Time	Notes
Light Heavyweight	Phil Davis	def.	Muhammed Lawal	Decision (unanimous) (29-28, 30-27, 30-27)	3	5:00
Welterweight	Saad Awad	def.	Evangelista Santos	TKO (punches)	1	4:31
Bantamweight	Josh San Diego	def.	Jeremiah Labiano	Decision (unanimous) (29-28, 29-28, 29-28)	3	5:00
Lightweight	Adam Piccolotti	def.	Ray Wood	Submission (rear-naked choke)	1	3:17
Welterweight	André Fialho	def.	Rick Reger	KO (punches)	1	2:11
Preliminary card (Spike.com)
Welterweight	Sam Spengler	def.	Doyle Childs	Decision (unanimous) (30-27, 30-27, 29-28)	3	5:00
Catchweight (160 lb)	JD Hardwick	def.	Jorge Acosta	Submission (guillotine choke)	1	1:21
Women's Strawweight	Jamielene Nievara	def.	Stephanie Frausto	TKO (punches)	3	2:43
Featherweight	Mark Dickman	def.	Thomas Diagne	TKO (punches)	3	3:05
Postliminary card (Dark Bouts)
Welterweight	Danasabe Mohammed	def.	Martin Sano	TKO (punches)	1	1:18
Flyweight	Josh Paiva	def.	Steven Gruber	Submission (rear-naked choke)	2	2:14
Heavyweight	James Chapman	def.	Sean Tucker	TKO (punches)	2	4:41
Featherweight	Anthony Taylor	def.	Victor Jones	KO (punches)	1	0:27

== Bellator 155 ==
Bellator 155: Carvalho vs. Manhoef
- Date: May 20, 2016
- Venue: CenturyLink Arena
- City: Boise, Idaho
- Attendance: 6,120
- Total gate: $497,778

Bellator 155: Carvalho vs Manhoef took place May 20, 2016, at the CenturyLink Arena in Boise, Idaho. The event aired live in prime time on Spike TV.

Background

The event was headlined by a match between Rafael Carvalho and Melvin Manhoef for the Bellator Middleweight Championship. Carvalho pulled off one of 2015's biggest upsets when he finished Brandon Halsey with a body kick in the second round to claim the Middleweight title at Bellator 144 last October. The Brazilian has not lost since his MMA debut in 2011 and has stopped 10 of his last 12 opponents. Manhoef earned his shot at the title by knocking out Hisaki Kato in the opening round at Bellator 146.

The co-main event featured former Bellator Featherweight Championship Champion Pat Curran facing off against former World Series of Fighting featherweight champion Georgi Karakhanyan.

This event was scheduled to crown the inaugural Bellator women's featherweight champion in a bout between Marloes Coenen and Julia Budd. However, Budd was injured and replaced by Alexis Dufresne thus changing the fight to a non-title bout.

A preliminary bout between Ricky Steele and Eric Cronkhite was cancelled after Cronkhite missed weight by 9 pounds.

Results

Fight card
Weight class				Method	Round	Time	Notes
Middleweight	Rafael Carvalho (c)	def.	Melvin Manhoef	Decision (split) (47-48, 48-47, 48-47)	5	5:00	(Note: For the Bellator Middleweight Championship.)
Featherweight	Pat Curran	def.	Georgi Karakhanyan	Decision (unanimous) (29-28, 29-28, 29-28)	3	5:00
Heavyweight	Dan Charles	vs.	Augusto Sakai	Draw (majority) (30-26, 28-28, 28-28)	3	5:00	(Note: Sakai was deducted a point for groin kicks.)
Women's Catchweight (151 lb)	Alexis Dufresne	def.	Marloes Coenen	Submission (triangle armbar)	1	4:33
Heavyweight	Chase Gormley	def.	Joey Beltran	Decision (split) (28-29, 29-28, 29-28)	3	5:00
Preliminary card (Spike.com)
Bantamweight	Jesse Brock	def.	Olly Bradstreet	Submission (rear-naked choke)	3	3:57
Lightweight	Marcin Held	def.	Dave Jansen	Decision (unanimous) (30-27, 29-28, 29-28)	3	5:00
Bantamweight	Casey Johnson	def.	Brendon Raftery	Submission (rear-naked choke)	2	1:16
Bantamweight	Joe Hamilton	def.	Tyler Freeland	Submission (rear-naked choke)	1	0:22
Featherweight	Vince Morales	def.	Hamilton Ash	TKO (punches)	3	2:32
Postliminary card (Dark Bouts)
Women's Flyweight	Veta Arteaga	def.	Jackie Vandenburgh	Decision (unanimous) (29-27, 30-27, 29-28)	3	5:00
Lightweight	Scott Thometz	def.	Josh Tyler	Decision (unanimous) (30-27, 30-25, 30-25)	3	5:00
Middleweight	Will Noland	def.	Sean Powers	KO (punches)	1	3:29

== Bellator 156 ==
Bellator 156: Galvao vs. Dantas 2
- Date: June 17, 2016
- Venue: Save Mart Center
- City: Fresno, California
- Attendance: 5,552
- Total gate: $451,578

Bellator 156: Galvao vs. Dantas 2 took place on June 17, 2016, at the Save Mart Center in Fresno, California. The event aired live in prime time on Spike TV.

Background

Marcos Galvão made the first defense of his Bellator Bantamweight Championship title against Eduardo Dantas. The rematch was originally scheduled for Bellator 150, but was scrapped following a last-minute illness suffered by Galvão. Both fighters cut their teeth with André Pederneiras’ Nova União squad in Rio de Janeiro, until their paths crossed at Bellator 89. Dantas won the fight via a second-round knockout. Dantas went on to defend the title against Anthony Leone before losing it to Joe Warren at Bellator 128. In turn, Galvão pieced together three consecutive victories and then defeated Warren via second-round technical submission to become the new champion.

Douglas Lima was originally scheduled to face Chidi Njokuani, but was pulled from this bout when he got the call to headline Bellator 158 in London against Paul Daley due to an injury that forced Josh Koscheck out of that match up.

Results

Fight card
Weight class				Method	Round	Time	Notes
Bantamweight	Eduardo Dantas	def.	Marcos Galvão (c)	Decision (unanimous) (50-45, 50-44, 50-43)	5	5:00	(Note: For the Bellator Bantamweight Championship.)
Welterweight	Chidi Njokuani	def.	Thiago Jambo	KO (body kick and punches)	3	2:39
Middleweight	John Salter	def.	Brandon Halsey	Submission (triangle choke)	1	4:03
Middleweight	Chris Honeycutt	def.	Mikkel Parlo	Decision (unanimous) (29-28, 30-27, 30-27)	3	5:00
Preliminary card (Spike.com)
Middleweight	Ben Reiter	def.	A.J. Matthews	Decision (unanimous) (30-26, 30-26, 30-26)	3	5:00
Lightweight	Carrington Banks	def.	C.J. Keith	Decision (unanimous) (30-25, 30-26, 30-26)	3	5:00
Postliminary card (Dark Bouts)
Light Heavyweight	Jermaine McDermott	def.	Blake Watkins	KO (punch)	1	0:20
Catchweight (140 lb)	Paul Ruiz	def.	Christian Buron-Navarro	Decision (split) (28-29, 30-27, 30-27)	3	5:00
Heavyweight	Javy Ayala	def.	Roy Boughton	TKO (punches)	1	3:02
Lightweight	Nick Bustamante	def.	Antoine Smith	Decision (majority) (29-27, 29-27, 28-28)	3	5:00
Light Heavyweight	Jose Cabesas	def.	John Paul Elias	KO (punch)	1	0:25
Heavyweight	Chris Lewis	def.	Myron Smith	TKO (punches)	1	4:48
Lightweight	Luis Jauregui	def.	Ryan Tobar	Decision (unanimous) (30-27, 30-27, 30-27)	3	5:00

== Bellator 157 ==
Bellator 157: Dynamite 2
- Date: June 24, 2016
- Venue: Scottrade Center
- City: St.Louis, Missouri
- Attendance: 11,982
- Total gate: $1,033,589

Bellator 157: Dynamite 2 was held on June 24, 2016, at the Scottrade Center in St. Louis, Missouri The event aired live in prime time on Spike TV .

Background

The event was headlined by a heavyweight bout between former UFC light heavyweight champion Quinton Jackson and Japanese Olympic gold medalist Satoshi Ishii. Jackson had a successful three-fight stint with Bellator MMA - two knockouts against Joey Beltran and Christian M'Pumbu plus a unanimous decision won over Muhammed Lawal - before returning to the UFC where he defeated Fabio Maldonado via unanimous decision at UFC 186. After facing Maldonado, a contract settlement brought Jackson back to Bellator MMA. A 2008 Olympic gold medalist in judo, Ishii began his MMA career in December 2009 and has competed against fighters such as Fedor Emelianenko, Mirko Cro Cop, Jerome Le Banner, and Tim Sylvia.

In the co-main event, former Bellator Lightweight Champion Michael Chandler took on top contender Patricky Freire for the vacant Bellator Lightweight Championship.

Like the previous Dynamite card, the show combined MMA and kickboxing bouts with a cage and ring set up side-by-side. Bellator Kickboxing: St. Louis - which featured a rematch between Joe Schilling and Hisaki Kato under kickboxing rules - aired immediately following the Dynamite 2 portion on Spike TV.

Results

Fight card
Weight class				Method	Round	Time	Notes
Catchweight (225 lb)	Quinton Jackson	def.	Satoshi Ishii	Decision (split) (29-28, 28-29, 30-27)	3	5:00
Lightweight	Michael Chandler	def.	Patricky Freire	KO (punch)	1	2:14	(Note: For the vacant Bellator Lightweight Championship.)
Featherweight (Kickboxing)	Kevin Ross	def.	Justin Houghton	Decision (unanimous) (29-27, 29-27, 30-26)	3	3:00
Women's Flyweight	Ilima-Lei Macfarlane	def.	Rebecca Ruth	Submission (rear-naked choke)	2	3:00
Women's Flyweight (Kickboxing)	Gloria Peritore	def.	Denise Kielholtz	Decision (split) (28-29, 29-28, 29-28)	3	3:00
Heavyweight	Matt Mitrione	def.	Carl Seumanutafa	KO (punch)	1	3:22
Preliminary card (Spike.com)
Welterweight	Chel Erwin-Davis	def.	Kevin Engel	Submission (rear-naked choke)	2	1:19
Welterweight	Brad Jones	def.	Tyler Clausen	KO (head kick and punches)	1	0:26
Catchweight (180 lb)	Joaquin Buckley	def.	Chris Heatherly	KO (knee and punches)	2	4:14
Welterweight (Kickboxing)	Darryl Cobb	def.	Elmir Kulosman	TKO (strikes)	2	2:28
Women's Flyweight (Kickboxing)	Tara Walker	def.	Mimi Kutzin	Decision (unanimous) (29-28, 29-28, 29-28)	3	3:00
Welterweight	Guilherme Vasconcelos	def.	Jordan Dowdy	Submission (rear-naked choke)	1	4:59
Featherweight	Justin Lawrence	def.	Isao Kobayashi	KO (punches)	2	2:11
Bantamweight	Matt Murphy	def.	Justin Robbins	TKO (doctor stoppage)	2	2:16
Featherweight	Rashard Lovelace	def.	Garrett Mueller	TKO (doctor stoppage)	2	5:00
Welterweight	Steven Mann	def.	Mike Estus	TKO (knees)	1	0:25
Bellator Kickboxing 2: St. Louis bouts
Women's Flyweight (Kickboxing)	Keri Melendez	def.	Sarah Howell	Decision (unanimous) (30-27, 30-27, 30-27)	3	3:00
Welterweight (Kickboxing)	Raymond Daniels	def.	Stefano Bruno	TKO (liver kick)	1	1:45
Middleweight (Kickboxing)	Hisaki Kato	def.	Joe Schilling	KO (spinning back fist)	2	2:59
Postliminary card (Dark Bouts)
Women's Catchweight (110 lb)	Ashley Cummins	def.	Nicole Smith	Submission (knee choke)	2	1:33
Women's Catchweight (130 lb)	Katy Collins	def.	Michelle Royer	Submission (armbar)	1	0:48
Middleweight	DeWayne Diggs	def.	Jason Christeson	Submission (rear-naked choke)	1
Heavyweight	Byron Stevens	def.	Lee Burns	TKO (strikes)	2	4:46

== Bellator 158 ==
Bellator 158: Daley vs. Lima
- Date: July 16, 2016
- Venue: O2 Arena (London)
- City: London, England
- Attendance: 12,311
- Total gate: 875,536£ (GBP) $1,155,181 (USD)

Bellator 158: Daley vs. Lima (aka Bellator: London) was held on July 16, 2016, at the O2 Arena (London) in London. The event had a tape-delayed broadcast on Spike TV and Channel 5 (UK).

Background

Originally, Bellator President Scott Coker announced that Kimbo Slice and James Thompson would compete in the main event of Bellator 158, to take place July 16 at London's O2 Arena. This was to be a rematch of their infamous 2008 clash under the EliteXC banner which ended in a controversial TKO win for Kimbo. Tragically these plans had to be scrapped, as Slice died suddenly on June 6, 2016, of heart failure.

Josh Koscheck was scheduled to make his debut on this card against Paul Daley. However, Koscheck withdrew from the bout and was replaced by Douglas Lima.

Fernando Gonzalez was supposed to fight Michael Page but visa issues forced him off the card and was replaced by Evangelista Santos.

Contractual issues with ATAK Promotions caused Mark Godbeer and Ben Smith to withdraw from the card.

Linton Vassell was supposed to fight Francis Carmont but a cut over his left eye forced him to withdraw and be replaced by Lukasz Klinger.

The Mohegan Department of Athletic Regulation was responsible for drug testing at this event and marks the first time that Bellator had a US-based athletic commission exercise regulatory powers abroad.

Results

Fight card
Weight class				Method	Round	Time	Notes
Welterweight	Douglas Lima	def.	Paul Daley	Decision (unanimous) (30-27, 30-27, 30-27)	3	5:00
Heavyweight	Matt Mitrione	def.	Oli Thompson	TKO (punches)	2	4:21
Light Heavyweight	Francis Carmont	def.	Lukasz Klinger	Submission (D'Arce choke)	1	3:54
Welterweight	Michael Page	def.	Evangelista Santos	KO (flying knee)	2	4:31
Catchweight (148 lb)	James Gallagher	def.	Mike Cutting	Decision (unanimous) (30-27, 30-27, 30-27)	3	5:00
Preliminary card (Spike.com)
Heavyweight	James Mulheron	def.	Neil Grove	Decision (unanimous) (29-28, 30-27, 30-26)	3	5:00
Bantamweight	Luiz Henrique Tosta	vs.	Dean Garnett	Draw (majority) (29-27, 28-28, 28-28)	3	5:00
Middleweight	Danny Mitchell	def.	CJ Meeks	Submission (twister)	1	4:25
Featherweight	Nathaniel Wood	def.	Chase Morton	Submission (rear naked choke)	3	3:55
Middleweight	Jason Radcliffe	def.	Jack Mason	KO (knee)	1	0:14
Middleweight	Manuel Garcia	def.	Alex Reid	Decision (unanimous) (30-27, 30-27, 30-26)	3	5:00
Flyweight	Pietro Menga	def.	Spencer Hewitt	KO (punch)	1	0:41
Middleweight	Mike Shipman	def.	Dominic Clark	Submission (anaconda choke)	1	1:33

== Bellator 159 ==
Bellator 159: Caldwell vs. Taimanglo
- Date: July 22, 2016
- Venue: Kansas Star Arena
- City: Mulvane, Kansas
- Attendance: 3,124
- Total gate: $206,978

Bellator 159: Caldwell vs. Taimanglo was held on July 22, 2016, at the Kansas Star Arena in Mulvane, Kansas. The event aired live in prime time on Spike TV.

Background

The event was headlined by a bantamweight title eliminator bout between Darrion Caldwell and Joe Taimanglo. The winner is expect to face the current bantamweight champion Eduardo Dantas. Originally set at bantamweight, the fight was switched to a catchweight when Taimanglo weighed in at 138 pounds.

In the co-main event, local fighter Dave Rickels met Melvin Guillard. It was originally scheduled to be a lightweight bout, but Guillard missed weight and came in at 157.9 pounds.

Results

Fight card
Weight class				Method	Round	Time	Notes
Catchweight (138 lb)	Joe Taimanglo	def.	Darrion Caldwell	Submission (guillotine choke)	3	0:09
Catchweight (158 lb)	Melvin Guillard	vs.	David Rickels	No Contest (overturned)	1	2:14	(Note: Originally a win for Guillard via KO (punches and elbows); overturned due to a failed drug test.)
Women's Flyweight	Emily Ducote	def.	Bruna Vargas	Submission (rear-naked choke)	2	0:29
Featherweight	Daniel Weichel	def.	Emmanuel Sanchez	Decision (split) (30-27, 27-30, 29-28)	3	5:00
Preliminary card (Spike.com)
Light Heavyweight	Philipe Lins	def.	Guilherme Viana	TKO (punches)	2	1:13
Women's Flyweight	Jessica Middleton	def.	Bruna Ellen	Decision (unanimous) (29-28, 29-28, 29-28)	3	5:00
Featherweight	Gastón Reyno	def.	LJ Hermreck	TKO (punches)	3	3:57
Bantamweight	Johnny Marigo	def.	Andy Riley	Verbal Submission (triangle armbar)	1	2:44
Lightweight	Fernando Martinez	def.	Marcio Navarro	Decision (split) (28-29, 29-28, 29-28)	3	5:00
Postliminary card (Dark Bouts)
Middleweight	Josh Pfeifer	def.	Henry Lindsay	Submission (armbar)	1	3:43
Catchweight (146.2 lb)	Brandon Phillips	def.	Chuka Willis	Decision (unanimous) (30-27, 30-27, 30-27)	3	5:00
Welterweight	Chris Harris	def.	Matt Foster	Submission (rear-naked choke)	1	1:23
Welterweight	Trey Ogden	def.	Manny Meraz	Submission (guillotine choke)	2	2:37

== Bellator 160 ==
Bellator 160: Henderson vs. Pitbull
- Date: August 26, 2016
- Venue: Honda Center
- City: Anaheim, California
- Attendance: 9,139
- Total gate: $897,468

Bellator 160: Henderson vs. Pitbull was held on August 26, 2016, at the Honda Center in Anaheim, California. The event aired live in prime time on Spike TV.

Background

The event was headlined by a Lightweight title eliminator fight between former UFC champion Benson Henderson and former Bellator featherweight champion Patrício Pitbull. Henderson, after being defeated in his April debut against welterweight champion Andrey Koreshkov, returned to the division where he twice defeated Frankie Edgar. He has also beaten former UFC title challengers Nate Diaz and Donald Cerrone. Pitbull sought to parlay the victory to a title shot against lightweight champion Michael Chandler, who claimed the belt by knocking out Pitbull's brother, Patricky, on June 24.

Due to pressure from fans the feature prelim was moved back to being the co-main even on the card featuring NCAA Division I National Champion in Wrestling Bubba Jenkins versus Georgi Karakhanyan. The last time these two met Karakhanyan defeated Jenkins by guillotine choke in the first round.

Additionally, four-time NCAA Division II Champion wrestler Joey Davis made his professional MMA debut on this card; as an amateur he had a record of 5–0. Davis recently graduated from Notre Dame College, where he accumulated an undefeated 131–0 record over the course of four seasons during his collegiate wrestling career. He is the only Division II wrestler in NCAA history to win four consecutive national titles, and is one of three wrestlers ever to complete a four-year college career with an undefeated record.

Kevin Ferguson Jr., the eldest son of Kimbo Slice, was scheduled to make his Bellator debut on this card against Jonathan Tomasian. However, the bout was cancelled on August 21 due to an injury received by Ferguson.

Results

Fight card
Weight class				Method	Round	Time	Notes
Lightweight	Benson Henderson	def.	Patrício Pitbull	TKO (leg injury)	2	2:26
Lightweight	Derek Anderson	def.	Saad Awad	Decision (unanimous) (30-27, 29-28, 29-28)	3	5:00
Catchweight (149 lb)	Georgi Karakhanyan	def.	Bubba Jenkins	KO (punch)	1	0:53
Featherweight	A. J. McKee	def.	Cody Walker	Submission (guillotine choke)	2	0:32
Preliminary card (Spike.com)
Catchweight (175 lb)	Joey Davis	def.	Keith Cutrone	Decision (unanimous) (30-27, 30-27, 30-27)	3	5:00
Lightweight	Gabriel Green	def.	Alex Trinidad	TKO (punches)	2	2:01
Catchweight (175 lb)	Andy Murad	def.	Johnny Cisneros	Decision (unanimous) (29-28, 29-28, 29-28)	3	5:00
Lightweight	Jacob Rosales	def.	Mike Segura	Decision (unanimous) (30-27, 29-28, 29-28)	3	5:00
Featherweight	Chinzo Machida	def.	Mario Navarro	TKO (punches)	1	2:57
Lightweight	Jake Roberts	def.	Stephen Martinez	TKO (punches)	1	4:24
Postliminary card (Dark Bouts)
Flyweight	Steve Ramirez	def.	Ron Henderson	TKO (punches)	3	5:00
Flyweight	David Duran	def.	Kyle Estrada	Decision (Split) (29-28, 28-29, 29-28)	1	2:24

== Bellator 161 ==
Bellator 161: Kongo vs. Johnson
- Date: September 16, 2016
- Venue: H-E-B Center at Cedar Park
- City: Cedar Park, Texas
- Attendance: 8,632
- Total gate: $780.053

Bellator 161: Kongo vs. Johnson was held on September 16, 2016, at the H-E-B Center at Cedar Park in Cedar Park, Texas. The event aired live in prime time on Spike TV.

Background

The event was headlined by a heavyweight fight between former UFC veteran Cheick Kongo and Tony Johnson. Kongo was currently riding a two-fight winning streak over Vinicius Queiroz and Alexander Volkov. Kongo also owns wins against Shawn Jordan, Matt Mitrione, Pat Barry and Mirko Filipovic. The bout was Kongo's third consecutive Bellator headliner slot. Meanwhile, Johnson boasted a three-fight winning streak, including a pair of victories under the Bellator banner – a January win over Raphael Butler and an April 2015 win over Volkov. Johnson also owns wins against UFC contender Derrick Lewis and former UFC champion Tim Sylvia.

Results

Fight card
Weight class				Method	Round	Time	Notes
Heavyweight	Cheick Kongo	def.	Tony Johnson	Decision (majority) (28-28, 29-28, 29-28)	3	5:00
Bantamweight	Joe Warren	def.	Sirwan Kakai	Submission (guillotine choke)	3	1:04
Women's Catchweight (130 lb)	Anastasia Yankova	def.	Veta Arteaga	Decision (split) (28-29, 29-28, 29-28)	3	5:00
Lightweight	Derek Campos	def.	Djamil Chan	Decision (unanimous) (29-28, 29-28, 29-28)	3	5:00
Preliminary card (Spike.com)
Welterweight	Garrett Scott	def.	Waylon Bronstrup	Submission (rear-naked choke)	1	0:50
Women's Catchweight (127 lb)	Emily Ducote	def.	Kenya Miranda	Submission (armbar)	2	4:37
Featherweight	Daniel Pineda	def.	Mark Dickman	Submission (rear-naked choke)	3	2:07
Postliminary card (Dark Bouts)
Bantamweight	Armando Villarreal	def.	Tommy Burghardt	Submission (rear-naked choke)	1	2:08
Featherweight	Matt Mazurek	def.	Jose Guerra	Decision (split) (27-30, 29-28, 29-28)	3	5:00
Catchweight (153 lb)	Rey Trujillo	def.	James King	Submission (arm-triangle)	1	1:20
Catchweight (158 lb)	Nick Gonzalez	def.	Warren Stewart	Decision (split) (29-28, 29-28, 28-29)	3	5:00
Lightweight (155 lb)	Sean Clements	def.	Jonathan Taylor	Decision (unanimous)	3	5:00

== Bellator Kickboxing 3 ==
Bellator Kickboxing 3: Budapest
- Date: September 17, 2016
- Venue: Syma Hall
- City: Budapest, Hungary

Bellator Kickboxing 3 was held on September 17, 2016, at the Syma Hall in Budapest, Hungary. The event aired on tape delay on September 23, 2016, in prime time on Spike TV.

Background

The event was headlined by a Bellator Kickboxing welterweight title fight between Karim Ghajji and Zoltán Laszák. Ghajji had previously won the title in his Bellator debut with a split decision victory over Mustapha Haida at Bellator 152.

Results

Fight card
Weight class				Method	Round	Time	Notes
Welterweight (Kickboxing)	Zoltán Laszák	def.	Karim Ghajji (c)	Decision (unanimous)	5	3:00	(Note: For the Bellator Kickboxing Welterweight Championship)
Welterweight (Kickboxing)	Raymond Daniels	def.	Zsolt Benedek	Decision (unanimous)	3	3:00
Women's Flyweight (Kickboxing)	Denise Kielholtz	def.	Renáta Lantos	Decision (unanimous)	3	3:00
Catchweight (189 lb) (kickboxing)	Alexandru Negrea	def.	Ali El Ameri	Decision (unanimous)	3	3:00
Lightweight (kickboxing)	Mustapha Haida	def.	Kike Bonnin	extra round decision	4	3:00

== Bellator 162 ==
Bellator 162: Shlemenko vs. Grove
- Date: October 21, 2016
- Venue: FedEx Forum
- City: Memphis, Tennessee
- Attendance: 9,140
- Total gate: $841,000

Bellator 162: Shlemenko vs. Grove was held on October 21, 2016, at the FedEx Forum in Memphis, Tennessee. The event aired live in prime time on Spike TV.

Background

Bellator 162 was headlined by the return of former middleweight champion Alexander Shlemenko for the first time in approximately 18 months, as he takes on The Ultimate Fighter 3 winner Kendall Grove. Shlemenko hadn't fought for Bellator since he knocked out Melvin Manhoef at Bellator 133 in February 2015. The former middleweight champ was suspended for three years by the California State Athletic Commission after failing a post-fight drug test for steroids. Shlemenko's suspension was reduced to one year, making him eligible to compete in February of this year. Shlemenko has fought twice in 2016 under the M-1 Challenge banner, scoring consecutive triumphs over Vyacheslav Vasilevsky. Grove has been victorious in three of his last four Bellator appearances, including back-to-back stoppages of Francisco France and Joey Beltran.

In the co-main event Bobby Lashley squared off with Josh Appelt. Lashley entered the cage on a seven-fight winning streak, while Appelt returned to Bellator on the strength of back-to-back victories.

Kevin Ferguson Jr., the eldest son of the late Kimbo Slice, was scheduled to make his Bellator debut on this card against Rick Bing. However, the bout was cancelled due to Bing missing weight for the fight.

Results

Fight card
Weight class				Method	Round	Time	Notes
Middleweight	Alexander Shlemenko	def.	Kendall Grove	TKO (punches)	2	1:43
Heavyweight	Bobby Lashley	def.	Josh Appelt	Submission (rear-naked choke)	2	1:43
Lightweight	Goiti Yamauchi	def.	Ryan Couture	Submission (armbar)	1	1:01
Middleweight	Hisaki Kato	def.	A.J. Matthews	TKO (punches)	1	4:58
Preliminary card (Spike.com)
Heavyweight	Chase Gormley	def.	Bobby Brents	Decision (split) (28-29, 29-28, 29-28)	3	5:00
Heavyweight	Virgil Zwicker	def.	Dan Charles	TKO (strikes)	2	4:31
Women's Featherweight	Julia Budd	def.	Arlene Blencowe	Decision (majority) (29-29, 30-27, 29-27)	3	5:00
Welterweight	Ricky Rainey	def.	Gilbert Smith	Decision (unanimous) (29-28, 29-28, 29-28)	3	5:00
Bantamweight	Steve Garcia	def.	Ronnie Lawrence	Decision (unanimous) (29-28, 30-27, 30-27)	3	5:00
Postliminary card (Dark Bouts)
Light Heavyweight	Grady Hurley	def.	Chad Cook	TKO (punches)	1	2:29
Welterweight	Wade Johnson	def.	Tyler Hill	Submission (rear-naked choke)	3	3:35
Lightweight	James Wallace	def.	Jonathan Burdine	Submission (rear-naked choke)	2	3:33
Middleweight	Eryk Anders	def.	Brian White	TKO (punches)	1	0:23
Catchweight (160 lb)	Jaleel Willis	def.	Omar Johnson	Decision (unanimous)	3	5:00
Heavyweight	Mike Wessel	def.	Frank Tate	Decision (unanimous)	3	5:00

== Bellator 163 ==
Bellator 163: McGeary vs. Davis
- Date: November 4, 2016
- Venue: Mohegan Sun Arena
- City: Uncasville, Connecticut
- Attendance: 9,156
- Total gate: $755,996

Bellator 163: McGeary vs. Davis was held on November 4, 2016, at the Mohegan Sun Arena in Uncasville, Connecticut. The event aired live in prime time on Spike TV.

Background

In the main event, Liam McGeary put up his light heavyweight title in a long-awaited match up with top contender Phil Davis. This was McGeary's second title defense. McGeary won the title by defeating Emanuel Newton in a five-round unanimous decision at Bellator 134. He then defended the title against Tito Ortiz at Bellator 142. McGeary has been out of action for over a year due to a medial collateral ligament injury. Davis defeated former light heavy champion Emanuel Newton and Francis Carmont in a one-night tournament to earn the title shot. While waiting for McGeary to heal, Davis also defeated Muhammed Lawal at Bellator 154.

The scheduled co-main event of Marloes Coenen vs. Talita Nogueira was cancelled the day before the event when Talita failed to make weight. A welterweight bout between Paul Daley and Derek Anderson was also scrapped on the day of the event after Daley fell ill from effects of his weight cut. Additionally, a catchweight bout at 160 pounds between Keenan Raymond and Kastroit Xhema was cancelled when Raymond withdrew from the fight.

The preliminary card featured the Bellator debut of Vinicius De Jesus. It also featured the professional MMA debuts of former standout wrestlers Ed Ruth and Tyrell Fortune. Ruth was a three-time NCAA Division I champion for Penn State, while Fortune won an NCAA Division II title for Grand Canyon.

Results

Fight card
Weight class				Method	Round	Time	Notes
Light heavyweight	Phil Davis	def.	Liam McGeary (c)	Decision (unanimous) (50-43, 50-45, 50-44)	5	5:00	(Note: For the Bellator Light Heavyweight Championship.)
Welterweight	Brennan Ward	def.	Saad Awad	KO (punches)	1	1:26
Catchweight (175 lb)	Neiman Gracie	def.	Rudy Bears	Submission (armbar)	1	4:39
Heavyweight	Javy Ayala	def.	Sergei Kharitonov	KO (punch)	1	0:16
Preliminary card (Spike.com)
Women's Flyweight	Hannah Regina	def.	Sarah Payant	Submission (armbar)	1	4:51
Catchweight (195 lb)	Tim Caron	def.	Mike Zichelle	TKO (punches)	2	1:22
Heavyweight	Tyler King	def.	Josh Diekmann	Submission (rear-naked choke)	2	1:39
Heavyweight	Tyrell Fortune	def.	Cody Miskell	TKO (knees & punches)	1	2:22	(Note: Aired on Spike Broadcast)
Catchweight (192 lb)	Ed Ruth	def.	Dustin Collins-Miles	TKO (punches)	1	3:19	(Note: Aired on Spike Broadcast)
Welterweight	Carlos Correia	def.	Ilya Kotau	Decision (split) (30-27, 28-29, 30-27)	3	5:00
Postliminary card (Dark Bouts)
Welterweight	Vinicius De Jesus	def.	James Boran	Submission (rear-naked choke)	2	1:55
Featherweight	Blair Tugman	def.	Walter Smith-Cotito	Decision (unanimous)	3	5:00
Featherweight	Thomas English	def.	Christopher Foster	Decision (unanimous)	3	5:00

== Bellator 164 ==
Bellator 164: Koreshkov vs. Lima 2
- Date: November 10, 2016
- Venue: Menora Mivtachim Arena
- City: Tel Aviv, Israel
- Attendance: 8,937
- Total gate: ₪3,081,813 (ILS) $803,980 (USD)

Bellator 164: Koreshkov vs. Lima 2 was held on November 10, 2016, at the Menora Mivtachim Arena in Tel Aviv, Israel. The event aired on Spike TV on tape delay.

Background

The event was headlined by two of the world's top Welterweights. Bellator champion Andrey Koreshkov met former champion Bellator Douglas Lima in a rematch in the main event. Koreshkov won the welterweight title with a unanimous decision victory over Lima at Bellator 140. He defended the belt earlier that year with a dominant win over former UFC lightweight champion Benson Henderson at Bellator 153. Lima won the vacant welterweight title with a second-round TKO of Rick Hawn at Bellator 117. After a lengthy layoff, he fought Koreshkov and lost via unanimous decision. After his loss to Koreshkov, he was out for a full year, but came back in July to defeat Paul Daley at Bellator 158.

In addition, the card featured one of Israel's own in the co-headliner, when newly signed Bellator MMA featherweight and Israeli Army veteran Noad Lahat met NCAA Division II All-American Scott Cleve, defeating him via a rear naked choke.

Results

Fight card
Weight class				Method	Round	Time	Notes
Welterweight	Douglas Lima	def.	Andrey Koreshkov (c)	KO (punch)	3	1:21	(Note: For the Bellator Welterweight Championship.)
Featherweight	Noad Lahat	def.	Scott Cleve	Submission (rear-naked choke)	1	2:26
Catchweight (150 lb)	Georgi Karakhanyan	def.	Kirill Medvedovsky	TKO (shoulder injury)	1	3:40
Women's Flyweight	Lena Ovchynnikova	def.	Karla Benitez	Decision (unanimous)	3	5:00
Preliminary card (Spike.com)
Light Heavyweight	Chen Shhori	def.	Kfir Eittan	KO (knee)	3	2:41
Welterweight	Moshe Rand	def.	Haitham Kiuof	TKO (strikes)	1	1:21
Lightweight	Elazar Tariku	def.	Rob Becker	Submission (keylock)	1	3:44
Welterweight	Alex Trofimov	def.	Sol Renato	Decision (split)	3	5:00
Bantamweight	Almog Shay	def.	Vitaly Khmeinytsky	Submission (heel hook)	1	1:45
Women's Featherweight	Olga Rubin	def.	Laurita Cibirite	TKO (strikes)	1	3:12
Bantamweight	Raz Bring	def.	Maor Kazalkopy	TKO (strikes)	3	1:40
Welterweight	Jackie Gosh	def.	Joaquin Buckley	TKO (punches)	1	2:44	(Note: Aired on Spike Broadcast)
Middleweight	Alexander Nikulin	def.	Avi Baron	TKO (strikes)	1	0:54
Bantamweight	Honor Kelesh	def.	Omri Barel	Submission (rear-naked choke)	1	3:02	(Note: Aired on Spike Broadcast)
Welterweight	Haim Gozali	def.	Zane Clerk	Submission (heel hook)	1	1:41

== Bellator 165 ==
Bellator 165: Chandler vs. Henderson
- Date: November 19, 2016
- Venue: SAP Center
- City: San Jose, California
- Attendance: 13,156
- Total gate: $1,289,288

Bellator 165: Chandler vs. Henderson was held on November 19, 2016, at the SAP Center in San Jose, California. The event aired live in prime time on Spike TV.

Background

The event was headlined by two of the world's top lightweights as two-time Bellator champion Michael Chandler met former World Extreme Cagefighting and UFC champion Benson Henderson. Chandler looked to defend his belt for the first time since defeating Patricky Freire via knockout at Bellator 157: Dynamite 2. A 15-fight veteran of Bellator MMA, Chandler has collected memorable wins at 155-pounds including a victory over former UFC lightweight champion Eddie Alvarez. Henderson earned a title shot in the lightweight division against its current titleholder in Chandler after defeating Patricio Freire at Bellator 160.

Results

Fight card
Weight class				Method	Round	Time	Notes
Lightweight	Michael Chandler (c)	def.	Benson Henderson	Decision (split) (48-46, 46-48, 48-47)	5	5:00	(Note: For the Bellator Lightweight Championship.)
Welterweight	Michael Page	def.	Fernando Gonzalez	Decision (split) (29-28, 27-30, 29-28)	3	5:00
Lightweight	Adam Piccolotti	def.	Brandon Girtz	Decision (unanimous) (29-28, 29-28, 29-28)	3	5:00
Women's Strawweight	Keri Taylor-Melendez	def.	Sheila Padilla	KO (punch)	1	0:47
Light Heavyweight	Linton Vassell	def.	Francis Carmont	Decision (unanimous) (30-26, 30-26, 30-25)	3	5:00
Preliminary card (Spike.com)
Welterweight	Aaron Hamilton	def.	Kevin Ferguson Jr.	Submission (guillotine choke)	2	3:00
Lightweight	Carrington Banks	def.	Jake Roberts	Decision (unanimous) (29-28, 30-27, 30-27)	3	5:00
Welterweight	Dominic Sumner	def.	Justin Roswell	TKO (punches)	1	2:09
Welterweight	Dwight Grant	def.	Danasabe Mohammed	Decision (unanimous) (30-27, 30-26, 30-26)	3	5:00
Welterweight	James Terry	def.	Justin Baesman	Decision (unanimous) (30-27, 30-27, 30-27)	3	5:00
Postliminary card (Dark Bouts)
Women's Flyweight	Sarah D'Alelio	def.	Jaimelene Nievera	Submission (armbar)	2	4:46
Middleweight	Diego Herzog	def.	Nick Pica	KO (strikes)	1	1:23
Bantamweight	Jeremiah Labiano	def.	Vince Murdock	Decision (unanimous) (30-27, 30-27, 30-27)	3	5:00
Bantamweight	Alvin Cacdac	def.	Steve Ramirez	TKO (strikes)	1	0:31
Featherweight	Beau Hamilton	def.	Victor Jones	TKO (strikes)	3	0:28
Lightweight	J.J. Okanovich	def.	Luis Vargas	Submission (armbar)	2	2:59
Lightweight	Hugo Lujan	def.	Cesar Gonzalez	Decision (split) (29-28, 27-30, 29-28)	3	5:00

== Bellator 166 ==
Bellator 166: Dantas vs. Warren 2
- Date: December 2, 2016
- Venue: WinStar World Casino
- City: Thackerville, Oklahoma
- Attendance: 1,350
- Total gate: $116,438

Bellator 166: Dantas vs. Warren 2 was held on December 2, 2016, at the WinStar World Casino in Thackerville, Oklahoma. The event aired live in prime time on Spike TV.

Background

The event was headlined by a title fight rematch as Eduardo Dantas defended the Bellator Bantamweight Championship against former champion Joe Warren. Dantas had won back to back fights since losing the Bellator bantamweight title to Warren at Bellator 128 in 2014. Warren was coming off a submission win against Sirwan Kakai at Bellator 161.

A fight between featherweight prospects A.J. McKee and Emmanuel Sanchez was scheduled for the co-main event. However, Sanchez pulled out in late November due to injury and was replaced by Ray Wood. Wood had been scheduled to face Treston Thomison on the preliminary card so Thomison received a new opponent in Dawond Pickney.

Results

Fight card
Weight class				Method	Round	Time	Notes
Bantamweight	Eduardo Dantas (c)	def.	Joe Warren	Decision (majority) (47-47, 49-44, 48-46)	5	5:00	(Note: For the Bellator Bantamweight Championship. Dantas was deducted a point for groin strikes.)
Featherweight	A.J. McKee	def.	Ray Wood	Decision (unanimous) (29-27, 30-25, 30-27)	3	5:00
Catchweight (138 lb)	Marcos Galvão	def.	L.C. Davis	Decision (split) (28-29, 29-28, 29-28)	3	5:00
Catchweight (195 lb)	Chris Honeycutt	def.	Ben Reiter	Decision (unanimous) (30-26, 30-25, 30-25)	3	5:00
Preliminary card (Spike.com)
Middleweight	Gregory Babene	def.	Emiliano Sordi	Submission (guillotine choke)	1	3:11
Catchweight (159 lb)	Treston Thomison	def.	Dawond Pickney	Submission (armbar)	1	0:51
Catchweight (164 lb)	Derrick Adkins	def.	Chris Jones	Submission (D'Arce choke)	2	4:09
Catchweight (210 lb)	Kinny Spotwood	def.	John King	Decision (unanimous) (29-28, 30-27, 30-27)	3	5:00

== Bellator 167 ==
Bellator 167: Caldwell vs. Taimanglo 2
- Date: December 3, 2016
- Venue: WinStar World Casino
- City: Thackerville, Oklahoma
- Attendance: 1,274
- Total gate: $109,883

Bellator 167: Caldwell vs. Taimanglo 2 was held on December 3, 2016, at the WinStar World Casino in Thackerville, Oklahoma. The event aired live in prime time on Spike TV.

Background

Bellator 167 was originally scheduled to be headlined by a rematch between Patricky Freire and Derek Campos. The pair previously fought at Bellator 117 with Freire winning by TKO in the second round. However, on November 25, it was announced that Freire pulled out of the bout due to injury.

Bellator 167 was instead headlined by a bantamweight fight pitting Darrion Caldwell against Joe Taimanglo. Caldwell and Taimanglo previously met in a catchweight bout at Bellator 159. Caldwell did well in the first two rounds, but was caught with a fight-ending guillotine choke nine seconds into the third round. The defeat was the first loss of Caldwell's career and Caldwell was a 14-1 favorite entering the bout, making the upset the fourth biggest in MMA history. Taimanglo was riding a four-fight winning streak into the rematch. Caldwell came into the first bout with Taimanglo off a career-best win over Joe Warren at Bellator 151.

A featherweight bout between Pat Curran and John Teixeira was also scheduled for this card. However, the fight was cancelled in early November due to an injury sustained by Curran. Teixeira instead faced Justin Lawrence.

Results

Fight card
Weight class				Method	Round	Time	Notes
Bantamweight	Darrion Caldwell	def.	Joe Taimanglo	Decision (unanimous) (30-27, 30-27, 30-27)	3	5:00
Featherweight	John Teixeira	def.	Justin Lawrence	Decision (unanimous) (29-28, 30-27, 30-27)	3	5:00
Women's Flyweight	Ilima-Lei Macfarlane	def.	Emily Ducote	Decision (unanimous) (30-27, 29-28, 29-28)	3	5:00
Catchweight (175 lb)	Chidi Njokuani	def.	André Fialho	KO (punches)	1	0:21
Preliminary card (Spike.com)
Light Heavyweight	Jarod Trice	def.	Tommie Britton	Decision (majority) (28-28, 30-25, 30-26)	3	5:00
Welterweight	Justin Patterson	def.	Codale Ford	Decision (unanimous) (29-27, 29-28, 29-28)	3	5:00
Lightweight	Jonathan Gary	def.	Aaron Roberson	Decision (unanimous) (29-28, 29-28, 29-28)	3	5:00
Preliminary card (Dark Bouts)
Welterweight	Fernando Gonzalez Trevino	def.	Chris Hicks	KO (punch)	1	0:15
Heavyweight	Bronson St. Romain	def.	Joey Soto	Decision (unanimous) (29-28, 29-28, 28-27)	3	5:00

== Bellator 168 ==
Bellator 168: Sakara vs. Beltran
- Date: December 10, 2016
- Venue: Nelson Mandela Forum
- City: Florence, Italy
- Attendance: 8,113
- Total gate: 862,006€ (ITL) $981,784 (USD)

Bellator 168: Sakara vs Beltran will be held on December 10, 2016, at the Nelson Mandela Forum in Florence, Italy. The event will air live in prime time on Spike TV.

Background

In the main event, Alessio Sakara faces Joey Beltran. Sakara made his Bellator debut earlier this year at the first Bellator event in Italy and defeated Brian Rogers by knockout in the second round.

The event was originally expected to be headlined by a rematch between Rafael Carvalho and Melvin Manhoef for the Bellator Middleweight Championship. The pair previously fought at Bellator 155 with Carvalho retaining his title due to a controversial split decision. Bellator announcer Jimmy Smith called it one of the worst decisions he had ever seen in the promotion; likewise 5 of 5 media outlets scored the bout in favor of Manhoef. However, on December 2, Carvalho pulled out of the match due to injury.

The event will also feature Bellator Kickboxing bouts including an anticipated female flyweight rematch between Denise Kielholtz and Gloria Peritore, the woman who defeated her this past June. The bout will be for the inaugural Bellator Kickboxing Women's Flyweight World Championship.

Results

Fight card
Weight class				Method	Round	Time	Notes
Light Heavyweight	Alessio Sakara	def.	Joey Beltran	KO (punches)	1	1:20
Lightweight	Goiti Yamauchi	def.	Valeriu Mircea	Submission (triangle choke)	1	3:33
Catchweight (189 lb)	Ed Ruth	def.	Emanuele Palombi	TKO (punches)	1	1:33
Light Heavyweight	Kleber Silva	def.	Philipe Lins	TKO (punches)	2	3:42
Middleweight	John Salter	def.	Claudio Annicchiarico	TKO (punches)	1	1:40
Bellator Kickboxing 4 fight card
Lightweight (Kickboxing)	Giorgio Petrosyan	def.	Jordan Watson	TKO (referee stoppage)	3	0:52
Women's Flyweight (Kickboxing)	Denise Kielholtz	def.	Gloria Peritore	Decision (split) (49-46, 48-47, 50-45)	5	3:00	(Note: For the Bellator Kickboxing Women's Flyweight Championship.)
Middleweight (Kickboxing)	Joe Schilling	def.	Vittorio Lermano	TKO (strikes)	1	2:43
Welterweight (Kickboxing)	Karim Ghajji	def.	Luca Novello	Decision (unanimous) (29-28, 30-27, 30-27)	3	3:00
Bantamweight (Kickboxing)	Kevin Ross	def.	Alessio Arduini	KO (head kick)	2	0:42

== Bellator 169 ==
Bellator 169: King Mo vs. Ishii
- Date: December 16, 2016
- Venue: 3Arena
- City: Dublin, Ireland
- Attendance: 12,184
- Total gate: 896,234€ (IEP) $1,187,940 (USD)

Bellator 169: King Mo vs Ishii was held on December 16, 2016, at the 3Arena in Dublin, Ireland. The event aired live in prime time on Spike TV.

Background

The event was headlined by a heavyweight bout between former Strikeforce Light Heavyweight Champion and Rizin Heavyweight Grand Prix Champion Muhammed Lawal and Japanese Olympic gold medalist Satoshi Ishii. Lawal won the two-night, eight-man tournament at Rizin Fighting Federation on New Year's Eve in Japan. A 2008 Olympic gold medalist in judo, Ishii began his MMA career in December 2009 and made his Bellator debut in June 2016 against Quinton Jackson at Bellator 157: Dynamite 2.

Bellator 169 is a Bellator MMA and BAMMA co-promoted event with the BAMMA 27 show filling out the rest of the card. Several top Irish prospects including Dylan Tuke, Ryan Curtis, Rhys McKee, and James Gallagher were featured on the card.

Results

Fight card
Weight class				Method	Round	Time	Notes
Heavyweight	Muhammed Lawal	def.	Satoshi Ishii	Decision (unanimous) (30-27, 30-27, 30-27)	3	5:00
Featherweight	James Gallagher	def.	Anthony Taylor	Submission (rear-naked choke)	3	1:52
Women's Bantamweight	Sinead Kavanagh	def.	Elina Kallionidou	Decision (unanimous) (30-27, 30-25, 30-26)	3	5:00
Featherweight	Daniel Weichel	def.	Brian Moore	Submission (arm-triangle choke)	1	4:44
Featherweight	Cameron Else	def.	Dylan Tuke	TKO (punches)	1	0:20
