= A. J. Matthews =

American mixed martial arts fighter

- Born: January 23, 1988 (age 38); San Diego, California, United States
- Other names: The Mercenary
- Nationality: American
- Height: 5 ft 11 in (1.80 m)
- Weight: 170 lb (77 kg; 12 st)
- Division: Middleweight; Welterweight
- Reach: 76 in (193 cm)
- Stance: Orthodox
- Fighting out of: Carlsbad, California, United States
- Team: Blackline MMA; Alliance MMA
- Years active: 2007–present

Mixed martial arts record
- Total: 18
- Wins: 9
- By knockout: 6
- By decision: 3
- Losses: 9
- By knockout: 5
- By decision: 4

Other information
- Mixed martial arts record from Sherdog

A. J. Matthews (born January 23, 1988) is an American mixed martial artist who competes in the Welterweight division. A professional competitor since 2007, he has also competed for Bellator MMA, Strikeforce, RIZIN, and King of the Cage.

== Mixed martial arts career ==
=== Early career ===
Matthews started his career in 2007. He fought mainly for Californian promotions such as King of the Cage and Gladiator Challenge. After four consecutive victories, Matthews signed with Strikeforce.

=== Strikeforce ===
Matthews faced Herman Terrado on April 9, 2011, at Strikeforce: Diaz vs. Daley. He had his first career's defeat via KO in the first round.

=== Bellator MMA ===
Matthews made his debut against Rudy Bears on October 8, 2011, at Bellator 53. He won via unanimous decision (29-28, 29–28, 29–28).

Matthews faced Charlie Rader on May 25, 2012, at Bellator 70. He won via KO in the second round.

Matthews faced Dom O'Grady on October 12, 2012, at Bellator 76. He lost via split decision (29-28 O'Grady, 29-28 Matthews, 29-28 O'Grady).

==== Fight Master: Bellator MMA ====
On May 6, 2013, it was announced that Matthews would be featured as a participant on Bellator MMA reality TV show Fight Master.

In the first episode, Matthews faced Strikeforce and Bellator veteran Darryl Cobb in a qualifying round for an opportunity to choose one of the four coaches of the show to work with. Matthews won via unanimous decision after three rounds and following his victory, he selected Randy Couture to be his coach.

In the seventh episode, Matthews faced two-time NCAA Division I All-American Eric Bradley in the round of 16 of the tournament. He was defeated via unanimous decision after two rounds.

==== Return to Bellator ====
Matthews faced future UFC Welterweight champion Belal Muhammad at Bellator 112 on March 14, 2014. He lost the fight via unanimous decision.

Matthews faced Kyle Bolt at Bellator 131 on November 15, 2014. He won the fight via TKO in the first round.

Matthews was expected to face Ben Reiter at Bellator 137 on May 15, 2015. However, Matthews pulled out of the fight due to injury and was replaced by Benji Radach.

Matthews eventually returned to face Emiliano Sordi at Bellator 141 on August 28, 2015. He won the fight via TKO after his opponent's corner stopped the fight between rounds one and two.

Matthews faced Ben Reiter at Bellator 156 on June 17, 2016. He lost a one-sided unanimous decision.

Matthews faced Hisaki Kato on October 21, 2016, at Bellator 162. He lost the fight via TKO in the first round.

Matthews faced André Fialho at Bellator 181 on July 14, 2017. After a back-and-forth contest, in which both fighters were able to land significant strikes, hurting their opponent, ultimately Matthews lost the bout via split decision.

Matthews fought Kendall Grove at Bellator 193 on January 26, 2018. He won the fight by split decision.

Matthews faced Logan Storley on August 17, 2018, at Bellator 204. He lost the fight via technical knockout in round two.

On May 3, 2021, it was announced that Matthews was no longer under contract with Bellator.

== Mixed martial arts record ==
Professional record breakdown
18 matches	9 wins	9 losses
By knockout	6	5
By submission	0	0
By decision	3	4

Res.	Record	Opponent	Method	Event	Date	Round	Time	Location	Notes
Loss	9–9	David Rickels	TKO (punch)	Bellator 219	March 29, 2019	2	3:24	Temecula, California, United States	
Loss	9–8	Logan Storley	TKO (elbows and punches)	Bellator 204	August 17, 2018	2	3:56	Sioux Falls, South Dakota, United States	Return to Welterweight.
Win	9–7	Kendall Grove	Decision (split)	Bellator 193	January 26, 2018	3	5:00	Temecula, California, United States	
Loss	8–7	André Fialho	Decision (split)	Bellator 181	July 14, 2017	3	5:00	Thackerville, Oklahoma, United States	Welterweight bout.
Loss	8–6	Hisaki Kato	TKO (punches)	Bellator 162	October 21, 2016	1	4:58	Memphis, Tennessee, United States	
Loss	8–5	Ben Reiter	Decision (unanimous)	Bellator 156	June 17, 2016	3	5:00	Fresno, California, United States	
Loss	8–4	Anatoly Tokov	KO (punch)	Rizin World Grand Prix 2015: Part 1	December 29, 2015	1	0:55	Saitama, Japan	
Win	8–3	Emiliano Sordi	TKO (corner stoppage)	Bellator 141	August 28, 2015	1	5:00	Temecula, California	
Win	7–3	Kyle Bolt	TKO (punches)	Bellator 131	November 15, 2014	1	1:39	San Diego, California	Middleweight debut.
Loss	6–3	Belal Muhammad	Decision (unanimous)	Bellator 112	March 14, 2014	3	5:00	Hammond, Indiana	
Loss	6–2	Dom O'Grady	Decision (split)	Bellator 76	October 12, 2012	3	5:00	Windsor, Ontario, Canada	
Win	6–1	Charlie Rader	KO (soccer kick)	Bellator 70	May 25, 2012	2	3:34	New Orleans, Louisiana, United States	
Win	5–1	Rudy Bears	Decision (unanimous)	Bellator 53	October 8, 2011	3	5:00	Miami, Oklahoma, United States	Catchweight (175 lb) bout.
Loss	4–1	Herman Terrado	KO (punch)	Strikeforce: Diaz vs. Daley	April 9, 2011	1	4:16	San Diego, California, United States	
Win	4–0	Sean Choice	TKO (punches)	PWP: War on the Mainland	August 14, 2010	2	3:54	Irvine, California, United States	
Win	3–0	David Gomez	Decision (unanimous)	KOTC: Excessive Damage	May 13, 2010	3	3:00	Highland, California, United States	
Win	2–0	Adam Figurski	KO (punches)	Gladiator Challenge: Venom	April 23, 2009	1	0:23	Pauma Valley, California, United States	
Win	1–0	Daniel Morales	TKO (punches)	TC 19: Total Combat 19	March 31, 2007	2	N/A	Yuma, Arizona, United States	
