= Dan Charles =

American MMA fighter

- Born: September 24, 1985 (age 41); Phoenix, Arizona, United States
- Other names: The Man
- Height: 6 ft 2 in (1.88 m)
- Weight: 241.4 lb (109.5 kg; 17.24 st)
- Division: Heavyweight
- Reach: 74.0 in (188 cm)
- Stance: Orthodox
- Fighting out of: Phoenix, Arizona, United States
- Team: Power MMA and Fitness
- Years active: 2011–present

Mixed martial arts record
- Total: 19
- Wins: 11
- By knockout: 7
- By submission: 2
- By decision: 2
- Losses: 7
- By knockout: 7
- Draws: 1

Other information
- Mixed martial arts record from Sherdog

Dan Charles (born September 24, 1985) is an American professional mixed martial artist competing in the heavyweight division. A professional competitor since 2011, he has competed for Bellator MMA and Absolute Championship Berkut.

== Background ==
Born and raised in Phoenix, Arizona, Charles was a three-sport athlete in high school with wrestling, football, and baseball, excelling at all three. Charles briefly continued his football career in college at Scottsdale Community College, before being introduced to MMA by his brother.

== Mixed martial arts career ==
=== Early career ===
Charles had just one amateur bout; a 15 second knockout loss, but elected to make his professional MMA debut later two months later in July 2011. Charles began his professional career 7-0 before being signed by Bellator.

=== Bellator MMA ===
Charles made his promotional debut against Samoan kickboxing legend Mighty Mo at Bellator 100 on September 20, 2013. Charles was handed his first professional defeat via third-round TKO.

After his loss to Mighty Mo, Charles fought Dale Sopi on November 23, 2013 in a local Rage in the Cage event in Charles' home state of Arizona. Charles was defeated again via TKO, this time with a head kick and follow-up punches in just 12 seconds.

After the two consecutive losses, Charles faced British fighter Stuart Austin at Bellator 126 on September 26, 2014. Charles won via third-round knockout. He then defeated professional boxer James Wilson a month later at the Bellator MMA 2014 Monster Energy Cup via unanimous decision.

Charles faced Bobby Lashley at Bellator 138 on June 19, 2015, replacing an injured James Thompson on short notice. He was defeated via second-round TKO.

Charles fought once more in the Bellator cage in 2015, defeating UFC veteran Chase Gormley via second-round KO. On May 20, 2016 Charles faced Brazilian Augusto Sakai at Bellator 155. The bout ended in a draw. Charles fought again on October 21, 2016 against former Strikeforce competitor Virgil Zwicker at Bellator 162. Charles, who came into the fight at his heaviest weight under the Bellator banner, was defeated via second-round TKO.

=== Independent promotions ===
Charles returned to competition on January 13, 2017 to face Mike Kyle for the ACB promotion. He was defeated via first-round TKO.

After a rematch with Dale Sopi fell through, Charles faced longtime veteran Tony Lopez for the RUF MMA Heavyweight Championship. Charles lost via first-round TKO. In a rematch again for the title two months later, Charles was able to defeat Lopez via knockout in the first round.

The two would meet for a third consecutive trilogy bout in 2018, with Lopez winning via a second-round submission to punches.

== Personal life ==
Charles runs a sales company and has a daughter.

== Mixed martial arts record ==
Professional record breakdown
19 matches	11 wins	7 losses
By knockout	7	7
By submission	2	0
By decision	2	0
Draws	1	

Res.	Record	Opponent	Method	Event	Date	Round	Time	Location	Notes
Loss	11–7–1	Tony Lopez	TKO (submission to punches)	Ringside Unified Fighting 24	March 17, 2018	2	1:32	Flagstaff, Arizona, United States	Lost the RUF MMA Heavyweight Championship.
Win	11–6–1	Tony Lopez	KO (punches)	Ringside Unified Fighting 22	September 23, 2017	1	1:32	Maricopa, Arizona, United States	Won the RUF MMA Heavyweight Championship.
Loss	10–6–1	Tony Lopez	TKO (punches)	Ringside Unified Fighting 20	July 17, 2017	1	2:50	Flagstaff, Arizona, United States	For the RUF MMA Heavyweight Championship.
Loss	10–5–1	Mike Kyle	TKO (punches)	ACB 51: Silva vs. Torgeson	January 13, 2017	1	2:15	Irvine, California, United States	
Loss	10–4–1	Virgil Zwicker	TKO (knees and punches)	Bellator 162	October 21, 2016	2	4:31	Memphis, Tennessee, United States	
Draw	10–3–1	Augusto Sakai	Draw (majority)	Bellator 155	May 20, 2016	3	5:00	Boise, Idaho, United States	
Win	10–3	Chase Gormley	KO (punch)	Bellator 143	September 25, 2015	2	4:35	Hidalgo, Texas, United States	
Loss	9–3	Bobby Lashley	TKO (punches)	Bellator 138	June 19, 2015	2	4:14	St. Louis, Missouri, United States	
Win	9–2	James Wilson	Decision (unanimous)	Bellator 2014 Monster Energy Cup	October 18, 2014	3	5:00	Whitney, Nevada, United States	
Win	8–2	Stuart Austin	KO (punches)	Bellator 126	September 26, 2014	3	0:18	Phoenix, Arizona, United States	
Loss	7–2	Dale Sopi	TKO (punches)	Rage in the Cage 169	November 23, 2013	1	0:12	Chandler, Arizona, United States	For the RITC Heavyweight Championship.
Loss	7–1	Siala-Mou Siliga	TKO (punches)	Bellator 100	September 20, 2013	3	1:26	Phoenix, Arizona, United States	
Win	7–0	Adam Smith	TKO (punches)	Rage in the Cage 166	June 22, 2013	1	1:20	Chandler, Arizona, United States	
Win	6–0	Maurice Greene	Decision (unanimous)	Flawless FC 3	May 18, 2012	3	5:00	Inglewood, California, United States	
Win	5–0	Alex Moore	TKO (retirement)	Rage in the Cage 162	September 29, 2012	1	5:00	Chandler, Arizona, United States	
Win	4–0	Kevin Absher	KO (punch)	Rage in the Cage 157	February 18, 2012	1	0:13	Chandler, Arizona, United States	
Win	3–0	John Maish	Submission (guillotine choke)	Rage in the Cage 156	October 22, 2011	1	0:37	Chandler, Arizona, United States	
Win	2–0	John Maish	Submission (keylock)	Rage in the Cage 154	September 9, 2011	1	0:47	Chandler, Arizona, United States	
Win	1–0	Nick Leitermann	TKO (punches)	Rage in the Cage 153	July 16, 2011	1	1:26	Chandler, Arizona, United States	
