= Virgil Zwicker =

American mixed martial arts fighter

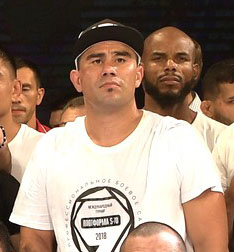
- An American professional mixed martial artist
- Born: June 26, 1982 (age 44); San Pasqual Indian Reservation, San Diego, United States
- Other names: Rezdog
- Nationality: American
- Height: 6 ft 2 in (1.88 m)
- Weight: 239.4 lb (108.6 kg; 17.10 st)
- Division: Heavyweight; Light Heavyweight
- Reach: 74.0 in (188 cm)
- Stance: Orthodox
- Fighting out of: Temecula, California, United States
- Team: Team Quest
- Years active: 2003, 2005–present

Mixed martial arts record
- Total: 26
- Wins: 17
- By knockout: 13
- By submission: 2
- By decision: 2
- Losses: 8
- By knockout: 2
- By submission: 4
- By decision: 2
- Draws: 1

Other information
- Mixed martial arts record from Sherdog

Virgil Zwicker (born June 26, 1982) is an American professional mixed martial artist currently competing in the Heavyweight division. A professional competitor since 2003, Zwicker has formerly competed for Bellator MMA, Strikeforce and KSW.

== Background ==
Zwicker grew up on the San Pasqual Indian Reservation in North County, San Diego, to a father who was a truck driver and a mother who worked hard to support Zwicker and his 11 other siblings. Zwicker's older brother was a Golden Gloves boxer and aided Zwicker in his fighting career. Zwicker belongs to the Kumeyaay-Ipai tribe and grew up in a poverty stricken environment. There weren't a lot of opportunities for Zwicker to play organized sports growing up, but he was a star football player in Pop Warner, known as a smaller player who hit very hard. With little supervision on the reservation, by the age of eleven Zwicker was routinely fighting grown men. It was also when he was eleven years old that he was arrested for the first time, in 1994. The arrest was for assaulting his school's vice principal and from then until 2005, Zwicker spent most of his time in and out of juvenile halls and prisons for various offenses, including assaulting a police officer. After spending over four years in prison for this offense, he returned a year later for knocking a man's eye out in a fight. He attended Orange Glen High School in Escondido, California.

== Mixed martial arts career ==
=== Early career ===
Zwicker's first fight came when he was released from being incarcerated and took the fight on two weeks' notice. He defeated Denis Hall in under a minute via TKO. He then racked up a 9–1 record, defeating notables such as future UFC and Strikeforce competitor Ovince St. Preux.

=== Strikeforce ===
Zwicker signed with Strikeforce and fought Lavar Johnson at Strikeforce Challengers: Bowling vs. Voelker. However, Zwicker lost via first-round KO, after the two veterans exchanged wild punches.

Zwicker next fought against Brett Albee at Strikeforce: Diaz vs. Daley. He won the fight via TKO in the first round.

At Strikeforce: Barnett vs. Cormier, Zwicker faced Guto Inocente. He lost the fight via unanimous decision (29-28, 29-28, 30-27).

=== KSW ===
Zwicker faced Mike Hayes on December 7, 2013 at KSW 25. He won the fight via KO in the first round.

=== Bellator MMA ===
Zwicker signed a mult-fight contract with Bellator, facing Nick Moghadden on September 13, 2013 at Bellator 99. He won the fight by TKO in round one.

In his second fight for the promotion, Zwicker faced Linton Vassell at Bellator 122 on July 25, 2014. He lost the fight via submission in the first round.

Zwicker filled in for an injured James Thompson against UFC veteran Houston Alexander on October 17, 2014 at Bellator 129. The fight ended in a majority draw as Alexander was docked a point for repeated illegal headbutting.

A rematch with Alexander took place at Bellator 132 on January 16, 2015. Zwicker won the bout via split decision.

Zwicker faced former UFC competitor Razak Al-Hassan at Bellator 137 on May 15, 2015. He won the fight via knockout in the first round.

Zwicker next faced Brian Rogers on December 4, 2015 at Bellator 147. He lost the fight via submission in the second round.

Zwicker faced Dan Charles at Bellator 162 on October 21, 2016. He won the fight via TKO in the second round.

=== World Fighting Championship Akhmat ===
Zwicker signed three-fight deal with Chechen promotion World Fighting Championship Akhmat. Zwicker made his debut for the organisation on May 21, 2017 in Grozny, Chechnya

== Kickboxing ==
Zwicker debuted as a Muay Thai kickboxer in the main event of WCK Muay Thai: Bad to the Bone in Temecula, California on April 6, 2013, losing to Sergio Piqué via split decision. He will rematch Piqué at WCK Muay Thai: Matter of Pride in Temecula, California, US on February 15, 2014.

== Personal life ==
On Christmas Eve of 2013, Zwicker was stabbed in an attempted carjacking, but was able to fend off the three assailants attempting to take his car and was not wounded fatally.

On July 10, 2019 Zwicker was arraigned on charges of sexual assault of a minor and plead not guilty. In all, Zwicker was charged with resisting arrest, possession of a controlled substance, illegal possession of a firearm, aggravated sexual assault on a minor and lewd acts on a child.

It was reported by San Diego County police that Zwicker has been involved in 10 legal cases between 2003 and 2014.

== Kickboxing record ==
Kickboxing record
0 wins (0 KOs), 2 loss, 0 draws
Date	Result	Opponent	Event	Location	Method	Round	Time	Record
2016-01-09	Loss	(China) Xiu Pengcheng	Kunlun Fight 36	Shanghai Oriental Sports Center, China	KO	2		0-2
2013-04-06	Loss	(Suriname) Sergio Piqué	WCK Muay Thai: Bad to the Bone	Temecula, California, USA	Decision (split)	5	3:00	0-1
Legend: Win Loss Draw/No contest Notes

== Championships and accomplishments ==
- Konfrontacja Sztuk Walki
  - Fight of the Night (One time)

== Mixed martial arts record ==
Professional record breakdown
26 matches	17 wins	8 losses
By knockout	13	2
By submission	2	4
By decision	2	2
Draws	1	

Res.	Record	Opponent	Method	Event	Date	Round	Time	Location	Notes
Win	17–8–1	Attila Végh	KO (punches)	Oktagon 12	June 8, 2019	1	3:18	Bratislava, Slovakia	
Loss	16–8–1	Alexander Romanov	Submission (neck crank)	S-70: Plotforma Cup 2018	August 22, 2018	1	1:15	Sochi, Russia	
Loss	16–7–1	Aleksander Emelianenko	TKO (punches)	World Fighting Championship Akhmat 44	December 17, 2017	1	3:03	Grozny, Russia	
Win	16–6–1	Nikoley Rachek	KO (punches)	Plotforma S-70 8th	August 8, 2017	1	0:15	Sochi, Russia	
Loss	15–6–1	Zelimkhan Umiev	Submission (kimura)	World Fighting Championship Akhmat 38	May 21, 2017	1	1:14	Grozny, Chechnya, Russia	
Win	15–5–1	Dan Charles	TKO (punches)	Bellator 162	October 21, 2016	2	4:31	Memphis, Tennessee, United States	Return to Heavyweight.
Loss	14–5–1	Brian Rogers	Submission (arm-triangle choke)	Bellator 147	December 4, 2015	2	4:38	San Jose, California, United States	
Win	14–4–1	Razak Al-Hassan	KO (punch)	Bellator 137	May 15, 2015	1	3:51	Temecula, California, United States	Catchweight bout of 206 lbs.
Win	13–4–1	Houston Alexander	Decision (split)	Bellator 132	January 16, 2015	3	5:00	Temecula, California, United States	
Draw	12–4–1	Houston Alexander	Draw (majority)	Bellator 129	October 17, 2014	3	5:00	Council Bluffs, Iowa, United States	Catchweight bout of 215 lbs.
Loss	12–4	Linton Vassell	Submission (rear-naked choke)	Bellator 122	July 25, 2014	1	1:07	Temecula, California, United States	
Win	12–3	Mike Hayes	KO (punch)	KSW 25: Khalidov vs. Sakurai	December 7, 2013	1	1:12	Wroclaw, Poland	KSW Fight of the Night. Catchweight bout of 209 lbs.
Win	11–3	Nick Moghadden	TKO (punches)	Bellator 99	September 13, 2013	1	3:22	Temecula, California, United States	
Loss	10–3	Guto Inocente	Decision (unanimous)	Strikeforce: Barnett vs. Cormier	May 19, 2012	3	5:00	San Jose, California, United States	Return to Light Heavyweight.
Win	10–2	Brett Albee	TKO (punches)	Strikeforce: Diaz vs. Daley	April 9, 2011	1	1:46	San Diego, California, United States	
Loss	9–2	Lavar Johnson	KO (punches)	Strikeforce Challengers: Bowling vs. Voelker	October 22, 2010	1	2:17	Fresno, California, United States	
Win	9–1	Eddie Sapp	Submission (rear-naked choke)	Native Fighting Championship 6	August 14, 2010	1	2:01	Campo, California, United States	
Loss	8–1	Cody Goodale	Decision (unanimous)	Gladiator Challenge: Maximum Force	April 25, 2010	3	5:00	San Jacinto, California, United States	Return to Heavyweight.
Win	8–0	Ovince Saint Preux	TKO (punches)	Top Combat Championship 1	September 26, 2009	2	0:46	San Juan, Puerto Rico	Light Heavyweight debut.
Win	7–0	William Richey	Decision (unanimous)	Called Out MMA 1	August 15, 2009	3	5:00	Ontario, California, United States	
Win	6–0	Buckley Acosta	TKO (punches)	Gladiator Challenge: Venom	April 23, 2009	1	2:59	Pauma Valley, California, United States	
Win	5–0	Dave Diaz	Submission	GC 85: Cross Fire	October 25, 2008	1	1:41	San Diego, California, United States	
Win	4–0	Abraham Ramirez	TKO (punches)	Apocalypse Fights 1	August 7, 2008	1	N/A	Alabama, United States	
Win	3–0	Ty Montgomery	TKO (punches)	Galaxy Productions	August 24, 2007	1	0:41	California, United States	
Win	2–0	Tom Hubert	TKO (doctor stoppage)	Total Combat 10	October 15, 2005	2	1:54	San Diego, California, United States	
Win	1–0	Denis Hall	TKO (punches)	CFF: Cobra Classic 9	April 16, 2003	1	0:58	Anza, California, United States	

== See also ==
- List of male mixed martial artists
