= Johnny Cisneros =

American mixed martial arts fighter

- Born: February 5, 1980 (age 46); Los Angeles, California, United States
- Other names: The Tattooed Terror
- Height: 5 ft 10 in (1.78 m)
- Weight: 175.6 lb (79.7 kg; 12.54 st)
- Division: Middleweight; Welterweight
- Reach: 74.0 in (188 cm)
- Stance: Orthodox
- Fighting out of: Laguna Niguel, California, United States
- Team: Joker's MMA; Lightning MMA
- Years active: 2010–present

Mixed martial arts record
- Total: 21
- Wins: 13
- By knockout: 7
- By submission: 1
- By decision: 5
- Losses: 8
- By knockout: 4
- By submission: 1
- By decision: 3

Other information
- Mixed martial arts record from Sherdog

Johnny Cisneros (born February 5, 1980) is an American mixed martial artist who competes in the welterweight division. A professional competitor since 2010, he has also competed for King of the Cage and Bellator MMA.

== Mixed martial arts career ==
=== Early career ===
Cisneros began his professional MMA career in 2010. He compiled an 8–2 record, competing for promotions such as King of the Cage and Gladiator Challenge, before beginning his stint in Bellator MMA.

=== Bellator MMA ===
In a Catchweight bout, Cisneros lost to Mikkel Parlo in his promotional debut at Bellator 115 on April 4, 2014, via unanimous decision. Parlo was able to control Cisneros on ground en route to a decision.

In another Catchweight affair and his second bout for the promotion, Cisneros was defeated by Ricky Rainey via first-round TKO on October 3, 2014, at Bellator 127. Rainey landed a knee to the head, hurting Cisneros and knocking him down, before subsequent hammer fists prompted a stoppage by the referee.

Cisneros defeated Gabriel Miglioli via a unanimous verdict, on August 28, 2015, at Bellator 141, thus, recording his first victory inside the promotion.

Cisneros faced Andy Murad at Bellator 160 on August 26, 2016. He lost the fight by unanimous decision.

Cisneros next faced Curtis Millender at Bellator 170 on January 21, 2017. He lost the fight via TKO in the second round.

Cisneros faced Marlen Magee at Bellator 192 on January 20, 2018. He won the fight via submission in the second round.

Cisneros faced Dave Terrel on November 24, 2018 at Golden Boy Promotions: Liddell vs. Ortiz 3. He won the bout via unanimous decision.

Cisneros faced John Mercurio on March 29, 2019 at Bellator 219. He lost the bout via majority decision.

Cisneros faced Mike Jasper on September 28, 2019 at Bellator 228. He won the bout in the second round after Jasper was unable to continue fighting due to an ankle injury.

Cisneros faced Joshua Jones on July 31, 2021 at Bellator 263. He lost the bout via ground and pound in the second round.

== Personal life ==
Heavily-tattooed, Cisneros received his first tattoo at age 16.

== Mixed martial arts record ==
Professional record breakdown
21 matches	13 wins	8 losses
By knockout	7	4
By submission	1	1
By decision	5	3

Res.	Record	Opponent	Method	Event	Date	Round	Time	Location	Notes
Loss	13–8	Joshua Jones	TKO (punches)	Bellator 263	July 31, 2021	2	4:15	Los Angeles, California, United States	Catchweight (180 lb) bout.
Win	13–7	Mike Jasper	TKO (ankle injury)	Bellator 228	September 28, 2019	2	2:48	Inglewood, California, United States	Catchweight (175 lb) bout.
Loss	12–7	John Mercurio	Decision (majority)	Bellator 219	March 29, 2019	3	5:00	Temecula, California, United States	Catchweight (175 lb) bout.
Win	12-6	Dave Terrel	Decision (unanimous)	Golden Boy Promotions: Liddell vs. Ortiz 3	November 24, 2018	3	5:00	Inglewood, California, United States	
Win	11–6	Marlen Magee	Submission (rear-naked choke)	Bellator 192	January 20, 2018	2	2:28	Inglewood, California, United States	
Win	10–6	Alexander Moses	TKO (punches)	Gladiator Challenge: Summer Slam	September 9, 2017	3	2:34	San Jacinto, California, United States	
Loss	9–6	Curtis Millender	TKO (punches)	Bellator 170	January 21, 2017	2	3:48	Inglewood, California, United States	
Loss	9–5	Andy Murad	Decision (unanimous)	Bellator 160	August 26, 2016	3	5:00	Anaheim, California, United States	Catchweight (175 lbs) bout.
Win	9–4	Gabriel Miglioli	Decision (unanimous)	Bellator 141	August 28, 2015	3	5:00	Temecula, California, United States	Welterweight debut.
Loss	8–4	Ricky Rainey	TKO (knee and punches)	Bellator 127	October 3, 2014	1	3:18	Temecula, California, United States	Catchweight (177 lbs) bout.
Loss	8–3	Mikkel Parlo	Decision (unanimous)	Bellator 115	April 4, 2014	3	5:00	Reno, Nevada, United States	Catchweight (195 lbs) bout.
Win	8–2	Melvin Costa	Decision (unanimous)	KOTC: Terrified	October 31, 2013	3	5:00	Highland, California, United States	
Loss	7–2	Daniel Hernandez	Submission (armbar)	KOTC: Devastation	April 11, 2013	1	2:00	Highland, California, United States	
Loss	7–1	Joshua Aveles	KO (punch)	KOTC: Vigilante	December 20, 2012	1	0:09	Highland, California, United States	
Win	7–0	Brandon Hunt	Decision (unanimous)	KOTC: Gun Show	October 25, 2012	3	5:00	Highland, California, United States	
Win	6–0	Walter Selva	Decision (unanimous)	KOTC: Hardcore	April 26, 2012	3	5:00	Highland, California, United States	
Win	5–0	Ronald LeBreton Jr.	TKO (slam and punches)	KOTC: Reckless Abandon	February 2, 2012	1	2:08	Highland, California, United States	
Win	4–0	James Cooper	TKO (punches)	KOTC: Magnaflow	December 15, 2011	1	0:40	San Bernardino, California, United States	
Win	3–0	Paul Arras	TKO (punches)	KOTC: Moral Victory	April 21, 2011	1	1:42	San Bernardino, California, United States	
Win	2–0	Heath Cassol	TKO (doctor stoppage)	Gladiator Challenge: Bad Behavior	June 27, 2010	1	2:59	San Jacinto, California, United States	
Win	1–0	Nelson Alvarado	TKO (punches)	Gladiator Challenge: Vision Quest	February 21, 2010	2	1:46	San Jacinto, California, United States	
