= Ben Reiter =

American mixed martial arts fighter

- Born: June 27, 1987 (age 39); Nesconset, New York, United States
- Other names: The Hunter
- Height: 6 ft 0 in (1.83 m)
- Weight: 239.2 lb (108.5 kg; 17.09 st)
- Division: Heavyweight; Light Heavyweight; Middleweight
- Reach: 77.0 in (196 cm)
- Fighting out of: Lima, Peru
- Team: Pitbull Martial Arts Center; Jackson Wink MMA
- Years active: 2011–present

Mixed martial arts record
- Total: 21
- Wins: 17
- By knockout: 7
- By submission: 2
- By decision: 8
- Losses: 3
- By knockout: 1
- By submission: 1
- By decision: 1
- Draws: 1

Other information
- Mixed martial arts record from Sherdog

Ben Reiter (born June 27, 1987) is an American mixed martial artist currently competing in the Heavyweight division. A professional since 2011, he has competed for Bellator.

== Background ==
Raised in Smithtown, New York, Reiter attended Smithtown High School, where he competed in wrestling. Talented, he later continued the sport for the University of Pennsylvania, graduating in 2009.

== Mixed martial arts career ==
=== Early career ===
Prior to signing with Bellator, Reiter competed mainly in Peru, for the Inka Fighting Championship promotion. He went undefeated, compiling a record of 14–0–1. The only blemish on his record was a draw with Marcos Rogério de Lima.

=== Bellator MMA ===
In his promotional debut for Bellator MMA, Reiter defeated Shamir Garcia via unanimous decision at Bellator 124 on September 12, 2014.

Reiter defeated veteran Benji Radach, via unanimous decision, at Bellator 137 on May 15, 2015. Reiter was originally scheduled to face A.J. Matthews at the event, but Matthews sustained an injury and was replaced with Radach.

Reiter received his first professional loss against Francisco France at Bellator 146 on November 20, 2015, submitting to a rear-naked choke.

Reiter/Matthews took place at Bellator 156 on June 17, 2015, which Reiter won via a unanimous decision. Reiter dominated the bout on the ground, almost getting a stoppage due to ground-and-pound towards the end of the third round and even hurting his opponent on the feet at one point.

Reiter faced Chris Honeycutt at Bellator 166 on December 2, 2016. Unable to stop Honeycutt's relentless strikes and takedowns, Reiter lost the one-sided fight via unanimous decision.

On February 20, 2018 it was announced that Bellator had released Reiter from the promotion.

== Personal life ==
Reiter resides in Lima, Peru with his wife and two kids. Reiter is also a Senior Director of Advancement for "Beat The Streets," an organization serving underprivileged youth in Philadelphia.

== Mixed martial arts record ==
Professional record breakdown
21 matches	17 wins	3 losses
By knockout	7	1
By submission	2	1
By decision	8	1
Draws	1	

Res.	Record	Opponent	Method	Event	Date	Round	Time	Location	Notes
Loss	17–3–1	Shawn Teed	TKO (punches)	CCFC 79: Sabatini vs. Chaulet	November 16, 2019	3	2:27	Atlantic City, New Jersey, United States	Heavyweight bout; for the vacant Cage Fury FC Heavyweight Championship.
Loss	17–2–1	Chris Honeycutt	Decision (unanimous)	Bellator 166	December 2, 2016	3	5:00	Thackerville, Oklahoma, United States	Catchweight (195 lbs) bout.
Win	17–1–1	A.J. Matthews	Decision (unanimous)	Bellator 156	June 17, 2016	3	5:00	Fresno, California, United States	
Loss	16–1–1	Francisco France	Submission (rear-naked choke)	Bellator 146	November 20, 2015	2	1:08	Thackerville, Oklahoma, United States	
Win	16–0–1	Benji Radach	Decision (unanimous)	Bellator 137	May 15, 2015	3	5:00	Temecula, California, United States	
Win	15–0–1	Shamir Garcia	Decision (unanimous)	Bellator 124	September 12, 2014	3	5:00	Plymouth Township, Michigan, United States	Return to Middleweight.
Win	14–0–1	Danilo Pereira	Decision (unanimous)	Inka FC 25	April 16, 2014	3	5:00	Miraflores, Lima, Peru	
Win	13–0–1	Adam Rodriguez	TKO (punches)	RDC MMA: Reto de Campeones 3	February 28, 2014	1	0:56	Mexico City, Mexico	Heavyweight bout.
Win	12–0–1	Amilcar Alves	Decision (unanimous)	SFE 2	November 30, 2013	3	5:00	Quito, Ecuador	SFE Middleweight (194 lbs) bout.
Win	11–0–1	Fabio Marongiu	TKO (doctor stoppage)	300 Sparta: MMA 3	September 16, 2013	2	N/A	Lima, Peru	
Draw	10–0–1	Marcos Rogério de Lima	Draw	Inka FC 22	June 29, 2013	3	5:00	Lima, Peru	
Win	10–0	Aldo Silva	Decision (unanimous)	Inka FC 20	February 27, 2013	3	5:00	Lima, Peru	
Win	9–0	Raimundo Moreno Lima Jr.	Submission (keylock)	Inka FC 19	December 12, 2012	1	2:24	Santiago de Surco, Lima, Peru	
Win	8–0	Fernando di Pierro	Decision (unanimous)	Inka FC 18	October 17, 2012	3	5:00	Santiago de Surco, Lima, Peru	
Win	7–0	Tyson Triplett	TKO (elbows)	Matrix Fights 6	July 13, 2012	1	2:00	Philadelphia, Pennsylvania, United States	Middleweight bout.
Win	6–0	Joao Paulo Pereira	TKO (punches)	Inka FC 16	May 23, 2012	1	1:12	Santiago de Surco, Lima, Peru	
Win	5–0	Daniel Aspe	Submission (rear-naked choke)	Inka FC 14	December 21, 2011	1	1:27	Lima, Peru	
Win	4–0	Vinicius Carvalho	TKO (punches)	Inka FC 13	October 26, 2011	1	3:53	Santiago de Surco, Lima, Peru	
Win	3–0	Fernando di Pierro	Decision (unanimous)	Inka FC 12	August 17, 2011	3	5:00	Santiago de Surco, Lima, Peru	
Win	2–0	Fernando Roca Duany	TKO (punches)	Inka FC 12	August 17, 2011	1	2:27	Santiago de Surco, Lima, Peru	
Win	1–0	Fernando Roca Duany	TKO (punches)	Inka FC 11	June 23, 2011	2	0:44	Santiago de Surco, Lima, Peru	
