= Macedonian Americans =

Americans of Macedonian birth or descent

Macedonian Americans Македонски Американци
- Macedonian language in the United States

Total population
- 65,107 (2024, est.)

Regions with significant populations
- New York metropolitan area, Metro Detroit, Ohio, and other metros in the Northeastern and Upper Midwestern United States, as well in Illinois and Connecticut

Languages
- Macedonian, American English

Religion
- Macedonian Orthodox

Related ethnic groups
- Macedonians, Macedonian Canadians, Macedonian Australians

Macedonian Americans (Macedonian: Македонски Американци) are Americans of ethnic Macedonian heritage.

== History ==
=== Review ===
Macedonian national feelings had shifted throughout the 20th century. According to the Harvard Encyclopedia of American Ethnic Groups, almost all of Macedonians in the U.S. until World War II classified themselves as Macedonian Bulgarians or simply as Bulgarians. Nevertheless, the Bulgarian national identification during the late Ottoman Empire, from where most of the emigrants arrived, was based on ethno-religious principles and still ambiguous. Furthermore, U.S. authorities made individuals to select from a limited set of pre-determined ethnic or national categories, where separate Macedonian national identity was not recognized by the authorities at the time, despite noting that some immigrants declared a separate Macedonian language and race. Early 20th century census documents, arrival records, and newspaper articles mention Macedonian language/mother tongue and race/nationality, and Macedonia as place of origin. However, the designation Macedonian at the time was mainly used as a regional identification. The Macedonian regional identity was primary for these immigrants, who variously viewed themselves as Ottoman subjects, Greek Orthodox Christians from Rumelia, or ethnic Bulgarians or Serbians. According to anthropologist Keith Brown, these declarations show that Macedonian national identity was emerging organically. The sense of belonging to a separate Macedonian nation did not get strongly established until after World War II, following the founding of the People's Republic of Macedonia within the Socialist Federal Republic of Yugoslavia and the codification of a distinct Macedonian language.

=== Late 19th and early 20th century ===
The first Macedonian immigrants to the U.S. arrived in the late 19th century from the Bansko region of what is today Bulgarian Macedonia. These Macedonians had often been educated by American missionaries and were encouraged to migrate to the United States for higher education or to attend missionary schools. But the first large swath of Macedonians came in the early 20th century from the border regions in the north of what is today Greek Macedonia, primarily the regions near Kastoria (Kostur), Florina (Lerin), and the south-west of North Macedonia, notably around Bitola. These Macedonians had faced the greatest retributions from the Ottoman military because the 1903 Ilinden uprising was centered in these areas.

In the 1910 United States census, enumerators were instructed not to record "Macedonian" as a mother tongue, but use Bulgarian, Turkish, Greek, Serbian or Romanian, as the case may be. Despite this directive, some Macedonian immigrants declared their native language as "Macedonian" in the census.

In December 1918 a congress was held in Chicago, lasting a week, where c. 200 attended. Given events in the First World War, and the break-up of the Ottoman Empire, local organizers prepared a proposal about the eventual after-war status of Macedonia. By a great majority, the delegates supported a proposal for annexation to Bulgaria. In January 1919, after Bulgaria lost the war, the Macedono-Bulgarian Central Committee in the US sent a report to the Great Powers. They explained their view of the real motives of Bulgaria to enter the war and demanded that Macedonia be joined to Bulgaria.

=== Between the World Wars ===
After the First World War, many Macedonian immigrants sought to return or visit their place of origin. In Greece, the authorities imposed political labels like "pro-Bulgarians" or "Bulgaro-Macedonians" on returning immigrants who mobilised against the Greek administration, while using terms like "Slavic-speaking" or "Bulgarian-speaking" to strip away political meaning from their ethnicity. Being perceived as a threat to the national unity, people suspected of being politically "pro-Bulgarian" were prevented by the authorities from returning. However, many Macedonians circumvented these restrictions by claiming a Serbian national affiliation to obtain Serbian passports in order to return to Greece. This highlighed how ethnic and political identities were manipulated and negotiated in response to state pressures and geopolitical conflicts.

In the 1920s, many Macedonian-Americans became very suspicious that the main Macedonian organization at that time – the Macedonian Patriotic Organization, existed to advance Bulgaria's political interests. Some Macedonian-Americans began to form smaller clubs and societies whose members were limited to fellow villagers. Members of these small groups could trust the others in their group, and they knew that they were not being taken advantage of by the leaders of the MPO.

During the 1930s, some ethnic Macedonians began to identify as "Macedonian", and promoted this new ethnic identification, following political directives. The first organization in North America to support the idea that Macedonians constitute a separate nationality was the pro-communist Macedonian People's League, which was active in the US and Canada. MPL, which was financially supported by the Soviet Union, acted aggressively against the MPO, which it believed was a Bulgarian weapon.

Immigration restarted after the wars; most of the new immigrants were from Greece, many of whom had been expelled from Greek Macedonia in the 1920s. The immigrants' organizations used the Bulgarian language in their official documents, but since the 1920s and 1930s the Macedonian language has been recorded in American censuses.

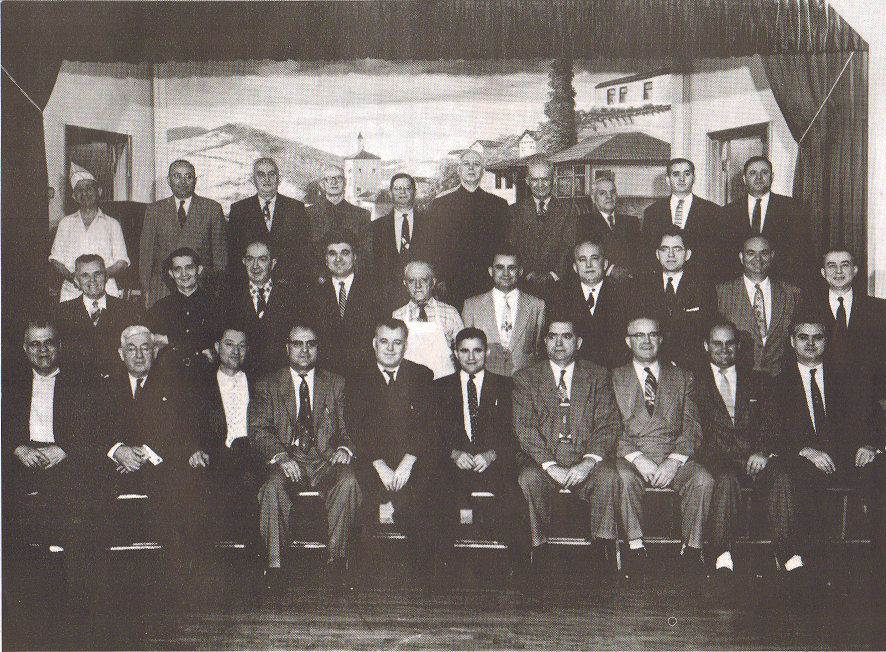
Macedonian Bulgarian Society "Alexander the Great" in Columbus, Ohio, c. 1950s.

=== Post World War II ===
The aftermath of the war led to a fresh round of Macedonian immigration; 70,000 emigrated to Canada, Australia, the U.S., and other European countries.

The growth of a distinct Macedonian-American community have occurred since the late 1950s, when the first immigrants from Communist Yugoslavia arrived. They have been instrumental in transmitting even the national feelings of the older, pro-Bulgarian oriented immigrants from Macedonia. Most of the American-born people of Macedonian-Bulgarian descent had little knowledge of Bulgaria and increasingly have identified during the second half of the 20th century simply as Macedonians. Still, some remnants of the pre-1945 Macedonian diaspora, from the whole area, have retained their strong regional Macedonian identity and Bulgarophile sentiments, while nearly all post-WWII Macedonian emigrants, from Greece and Yugoslavia, have a strong ethnic Macedonian identity. After Yugoslavia liberalized its emigration policies in 1960, another 40,000 Macedonians emigrated during the period 1960-77. Most have been economic migrants rather than political dissidents. At that time most of the Americans born of Macedonian Bulgarian descent have hardly any knowledge of Bulgaria and increasingly began to identify themselves simply as Macedonians.

== Demographics ==
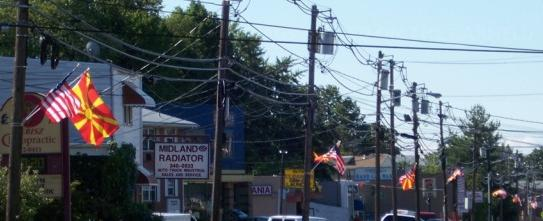
Macedonian and U.S. flags on the streets in Garfield, New Jersey on Macedonian Independence Day

A large proportion of Macedonian Americans live in the New York metropolitan area and the Northeastern United States. Another large cluster of Macedonian Americans lives in the Midwest, particularly Detroit, where roughly 10,000 (nearly 5% of all Macedonian Americans) are reported to be living. In 2016 census, Macedonian Americans community reach by 57,221.

=== Religion ===
Most Macedonian Americans, especially those immigrating to North America in the last half of the 20th century, belong to the Macedonian Orthodox Church, under the American-Canadian Macedonian Orthodox Diocese. Macedonian Americans immigrating before that time were generally affiliated with the Macedono-Bulgarian Orthodox Church. Smaller numbers of Macedonian Americans attend parishes affiliated with the Serbian Orthodox Church, Russian Orthodox Church or the Greek Orthodox Church. Through assimilation or intermarriage, many who remain observant are members of the Catholic Church and various Protestant denominations.

There are about 20 Macedonian Orthodox Churches in the United States, of which all but four are located in the Northeast or Midwest. The oldest parish of the Macedonian Orthodox Church in America is the Macedonian Orthodox Cathedral of the Dormition of the Virgin Mary located in Columbus (Reynoldsburg), Ohio. The parish was organized on September 17, 1958.

=== Macedonian language in the United States ===
Three universities in the United States, the University of Chicago, Arizona State University, and Indiana University, offer Macedonian language courses.

Michigan has more Macedonian language speakers than any other state with 4,425. Five more states, New Jersey, New York, Indiana, Ohio, and Illinois, also have more than 1,000 speakers.

=== Counties by concentration of Macedonians ===
Rank	County	State	Foreign-born Macedonian population	% Macedonian
1	Cook	Illinois	2,800	0.05%
2	Macomb	Michigan	2,100	0.2%
3	Bergen	New Jersey	1,900	0.2%

As of 2000, 0.5% of residents of Hamtramck, Michigan, a city primarily surrounded by Detroit, are of Macedonian ancestry.

== Culture ==
=== Cuisine ===
Macedonian Americans have been involved in the development of regional food dishes like Cincinnati chili and Coney Island hot dogs.

=== Media ===
Makedonski Glas (Trans. Macedonian Voice, Macedonian: Македонски Глас) was a Macedonian independent newspaper that was published bi-weekly in Garfield, New Jersey. The first issue of Makedonski Glas was published in November 2004.

== Notable people ==
=== Arts and academia ===
- Vladimir Četkar, jazz guitarist
- Stoyan Christowe (1898–1995), author and member of the Macedonian Academy of Sciences and Arts
- Mila Hermanovski (born 1969), costume and fashion designer
- Stefan Janoski (born 1979), skateboarder and artist
- Milcho Manchevski, film director
- Darko Mitrevski (born 1971), film director and screenwriter
- Stivi Paskoski, actor

=== Business ===
- George Atanasoski (born 1952), businessman, politician, and founder of Makedonsko Sonce magazine
- The Ilitch family of Detroit-area businesspeople
  - Mike Ilitch (1929–2017), entrepreneur, founder of the Little Caesars pizza chain and owner of the Detroit Red Wings and Detroit Tigers
  - Marian Ilitch (born 1933), wife of Mike Ilitch and owner of Detroit's MotorCity Casino
  - Christopher Ilitch (born 1965), son of Mike and Marian, brother of Denise, president and CEO of Ilitch Holdings, Inc.
- Katrina Markoff (born 1973), chocolatier
- Andy Peykoff (born 1976), founder of Niagara Bottling
- Mike Zafirovski (born 1953), president and CEO of Nortel Networks and Board of Directors at Boeing

=== Politics ===
- Jimmy Dimos (1938–2023), politician, former Speaker of the Louisiana House
- Tim Goeglein (born 1964), Deputy Director of Public Liaison, Office of Public Liaison, Executive Office of the President under George W. Bush
- Denise Ilitch (born 1955), daughter of Mike and Marian and sister of Christopher (listed above under "Business"), businesswoman, lawyer, and member of the Board of Regents of the University of Michigan
- Smile Vojdanov (1872–1958), revolutionary and founder of the Macedonian People's League

=== Sport ===
- Vlatko Andonovski (born 1976), former head coach of the United States women's national soccer team (2019–2023)
- Dino Delevski (born 1976), indoor soccer player
- Slobo Ilijevski (1949–2008), soccer player
- Brian Iloski (born 1995), soccer player
- Tommy Ivan (1911–1999), three-time Stanley Cup winning ice hockey coach
- Vlade Janakievski (born 1957), college football placekicker
- Kevin Kouzmanoff (born 1981), Major League Baseball third baseman
- Jovan Kirovski (born 1976), US soccer player, technical director for the LA Galaxy
- Djordje Mihailovic (born 1998), soccer player
- Danny Musovski (born 1995), soccer player
- George Nanchoff (born 1954), soccer player
- Louis Nanchoff (born 1956), soccer player
- Paul Naumoff (1945–2018), football linebacker
- Sandre Naumovski (born 1979), indoor soccer player
- Nina Nunes (born 1985), mixed martial artist
- Pete Stoyanovich (born 1967), football placekicker

== See also ==
General:

- Hyphenated American
