= Niedźwiedź (surname) =

Niedźwiedź or Niedzwiedz is a Polish language surname from the Polish word for bear. Notable people with the name include:

- Agnieszka Niedźwiedź (1995), Polish mixed martial artist
- Iwona Niedźwiedź (1979), Polish handball player
- Janusz Niedźwiedź (1982), Polish football player and manager
- Klaus Niedzwiedz (1951), race driver and motoring journalist
