= Bellator 298 =

Bellator mixed martial arts event in 2023

Bellator 298: Storley vs. Ward
- The poster for Bellator 298: Storley vs. Ward
- Promotion: Bellator MMA
- Date: August 11, 2023
- Venue: Sanford Pentagon
- City: Sioux Falls, South Dakota, United States

Event chronology
Bellator MMA x Rizin 2	Bellator 298: Storley vs. Ward	Bellator 299: Eblen vs. Edwards

Bellator 298: Storley vs. Ward was a mixed martial arts event produced by Bellator MMA that took place on August 11, 2023, at the Sanford Pentagon in Sioux Falls, South Dakota, United States.

== Background ==
The event marked the promotion's fourth visit to Sioux Falls and first since Bellator 284 in August 2022.

A welterweight bout between former interim Bellator Welterweight Champion Logan Storley and Brennan Ward headlined the event.

The event also features a heavyweight bout between former Interim Heavyweight Champion Valentin Moldavsky and Steve Mowry. The pairing previously met at Bellator 284 in August 2022, where the bout ended in a no contest as a result of an accidental eye poke by Moldavsky during the first round.

A bantamweight bout between James Gallagher and Cris Lencioni was scheduled to take place at the event. However after Lencioni suffered cardiac arrest in mid June, he was replaced by James Gonzalez.

At weigh-ins, Diana Avsaragova weighed in at 127.2 pounds, 1.2 pounds over the Flyweight non-title limit. Due to this, the bout proceeded at catchweight and she was fined 20 percent of his purse, which went to her opponent Justine Kish.

== Results ==
Main Card (Showtime)
Weight class				Method	Round	Time	Notes
Welterweight	Logan Storley	def.	Brennan Ward	TKO (punches)	2	4:05
Heavyweight	Valentin Moldavsky	def.	Steve Mowry	Decision (unanimous) (30–27, 30–27, 30–27)	3	5:00
Middleweight	Aaron Jeffery	def.	Dalton Rosta	Decision (unanimous) (30–27, 29–28, 29–28)	3	5:00
Featherweight	James Gallagher	def.	James Gonzalez	Decision (split) (28–29, 29–28, 29–28)	3	5:00
Catchweight (160 lb)	Sidney Outlaw	def.	Islam Mamedov	Decision (unanimous) (30–27, 30–27, 30–27)	3	5:00
Preliminary card (Youtube/Pluto TV)
Catchweight (127 lb)	Justine Kish	def.	Diana Avsaragova	Decision (unanimous) (29–28, 30–27, 30–27)	3	5:00	(Note: Avsaragova missed weight (127.2 lb))
Bantamweight	Enrique Barzola	def.	Jaylon Bates	Decision (unanimous) (30–27, 30–27, 30–27)	3	5:00
Featherweight	Lucas Brennan	def.	Weber Almeida	KO (knee)	3	3:32
Bantamweight	Kasum Kasumov	def.	Josh Hill	Decision (split) (29–28, 28–29, 30–27)	3	5:00
Lightweight	Vladimir Tokov	def.	Jairo Pacheco	Decision (unanimous) (30–27, 29–28, 29–28)	3	5:00
Bantamweight	Leandro Higo	def.	Nikita Mikhailov	Submission (guillotine choke)	2	2:50
Lightweight	Alfie Davis	def.	Aalon Cruz	Decision (unanimous) (30–27, 30–27, 30–27)	3	5:00
Women's Featherweight	Ekaterina Shakalova	def.	Dayana Silva	Decision (split) (29–28, 28–29, 30–27)	3	5:00
Light Heavyweight	Sullivan Cauley	def.	Hamza Salim	Technical Submission (arm triangle choke)	1	4:24
Bantamweight	Marcirley Alves	def.	Jerrell Hodge	KO (punches)	1	3:53
Featherweight	Jordan Oliver	def.	Andrew Triolo	Submission (arm triangle choke)	1	1:05
Postliminary card (Youtube)
Featherweight	Michael Blockhus	def.	Eli Mefford	TKO (punches)	1	2:43

== See also ==
- 2023 in Bellator MMA
- List of Bellator MMA events
- List of current Bellator fighters
