= Hell's Kitchen (American TV series) season 13 =

Hell's Kitchen
- Season 13
- Region 1 DVD cover
- Hosted by: Gordon Ramsay
- No. of contestants: 18
- Winner: La Tasha McCutchen
- Runner-up: Bryant Gallaher
- No. of episodes: 16

Release
- Original network: Fox
- Original release: September 10 – December 17, 2014

Season chronology
- ← Previous; Season 12 Next → Season 14

Season 13 of the American competitive reality television series Hell's Kitchen premiered on Fox on September 10, 2014, and concluded on December 17, 2014. Gordon Ramsay returned as host and head chef, while Andi Van Willigan returned as the Red Team's sous-chef and James Avery returned as the Blue Team's sous-chef. Marino Monferrato debuted as maître d', replacing Jean-Philippe Susilovic.

The season was won by kitchen supervisor La Tasha McCutchen, with lead line cook Bryant Gallaher finishing second.

== Chefs ==
Eighteen chefs competed in season 13 for the first time since season 10.

Contestant	Age	Occupation	Hometown	Result
La Tasha McCutchen	33	Kitchen supervisor	Winter Haven, Florida	Winner
Bryant Gallaher	29	Lead line cook	Virginia Beach, Virginia	Runner-Up
Sade Dancy	25	Lead line cook	Philadelphia, Pennsylvania	Eliminated before Finals
Jennifer Salhoff	33	Private chef	Philadelphia, Pennsylvania	Eliminated before Finals
Rosanne "Roe" DiLeo (Note: Chef returned to Hells Kitchen again on Season 18, finished at 10th place.)	33	Head chef	Dallas, Texas	Eliminated after Fourteenth Service
Brian Santos	33	Sous chef	Boston, Massachusetts	Eliminated after Thirteenth Service
Sterling Wright	40	Grill chef	Nashville, Tennessee	Eliminated after Twelfth Service
Fernando Cruz	28	Executive chef	La Quinta, California	Eliminated after Eleventh Service
Aaron Lhamon	28	Lead line cook	Maynard, Massachusetts	Quit after Tenth Service
Frank Bilotti	26	Executive chef	Staten Island, New York	Eliminated after Ninth Service
Steve Rosenthal	34	Executive chef	Detroit, Michigan	Hospitalized before Ninth Service
Ashley Sherman	29	Lead line cook	Bethlehem, Pennsylvania	Eliminated after Seventh Service
Katie McKeown	23	Line cook	Dallas, Texas	Eliminated after Sixth Service
Kalen Morgenstern	32	Sous chef	River Oaks, Texas	Eliminated after Fifth Service
James "JR" Robinson	29	Private chef	Washington, D.C.	Eliminated after Fourth Service
Denine Giordano	23	Culinary student	Philadelphia, Pennsylvania	Eliminated after Third Service
Janai Simpson	24	Chef de Partie	LaGrange, Georgia	Eliminated after Second Service
John Paul "JP" DeDominicis	28	Kitchen manager	Boston, Massachusetts	Eliminated after First Service

== Contestant progress ==
No.	Chef	Original teams						1st switch	2nd switch					Individuals			Finals
No.	Chef	1301	1302	1303	1304	1305	1306	1307	1308	1309	1310	1311	1312	1313	1314	1315	1316
1	La Tasha	WIN	LOSE	LOSE	WIN	LOSE	LOSE	LOSE	LOSE	LOSE	WIN	LOSE	WIN	IN	IN	IN	WINNER
2	Bryant	LOSE	LOSE	WIN	LOSE	WIN	LOSE	LOSE	WIN	WIN	NOM	LOSE	WIN	BoW	IN	IN	RUNNER-UP
3	Sade	WIN	LOSE	LOSE	WIN	LOSE	LOSE	LOSE	WIN	WIN	LOSE	LOSE	WIN	IN	IN	OUT	La Tasha's team
4	Jennifer	WIN	LOSE	LOSE	WIN	LOSE	LOSE	LOSE	LOSE	LOSE	WIN	LOSE	WIN	IN	NOM	OUT	Bryant's team
5	Roe	WIN	LOSE	LOSE	WIN	LOSE	NOM	NOM	LOSE	LOSE	WIN	NOM	NOM	NOM	OUT		La Tasha's team
6	Santos	LOSE	LOSE	WIN	LOSE	WIN	LOSE	LOSE	WIN	WIN	LOSE	NOM	NOM	OUT			Bryant's team
7	Sterling	LOSE	NOM	WIN	LOSE	WIN	NOM	LOSE	NOM	LOSE	WIN	NOM	OUT (Note: Sterling, along with Frank was also eliminated in the kitchen, during the post-mortem)				Bryant's team
8	Fernando	LOSE	NOM	WIN	LOSE	WIN	LOSE	LOSE	WIN	WIN	LOSE	OUT					La Tasha's team
9	Aaron	NOM	LOSE	WIN	LOSE	WIN	LOSE	NOM	WIN	WIN	QUIT						
10	Frank	LOSE	LOSE	WIN	NOM	WIN	LOSE	LOSE	NOM	OUT							Bryant's team
11	Steve	LOSE	LOSE	WIN	NOM	WIN	NOM	NOM	WIN	HOSP							
12	Ashley	WIN	LOSE	LOSE	WIN	LOSE	LOSE	OUT									La Tasha's team
13	Katie	WIN	LOSE	LOSE	WIN	NOM	OUT										
14	Kalen	WIN	LOSE	NOM	WIN	OUT											
15	JR	LOSE	LOSE	WIN	OUT												
16	Denine	WIN	NOM	OUT													
17	Janai	WIN	OUT														
18	JP	OUT															

Keywords

- WIN = Won the dinner service
- LOSE = Lost the dinner service
- BoB = Best of the Best, usually exempt from nomination
- BoW = Best of the Worst, sometimes exempt from nomination
- IN = not nominated for elimination
- NOM = nominated for elimination
- OUT = eliminated normally
- LEFT = withdrew from competition
- HOSP = eliminated due to hospitalization
- EJEC = eliminated during service

Color key
Chef was eliminated after regular nomination
Chef was eliminated after Ramsay's nomination
Chef was eliminated without nomination
Chef was eliminated from winning team
Chef was eliminated in the Cook For Your Life challenge
Chef was nominated to participate in the Cook For Your Life challenge
Chef was eliminated during service
Chef withdrew from the competition
Chef was the Best of the Best/Worst
Chef was retained after regular nomination
Chef was retained after Ramsay's nomination
Chef's nomination was voided
The winner of Hell's Kitchen
The runner-up of Hell's Kitchen

== Episodes ==
No. overall	No. in season	Title	Original release date	U.S. viewers (millions)
187	1	"18 Chefs Compete"	September 10, 2014	4.27
The season began with 18 contestants being transported to the Cinerama Dome theater in Los Angeles, where they first viewed a short film that had an introduction by Ramsay, who informed this season's contestants of the challenges they would face. Team challenge/signature dish: The chefs were immediately given their first challenge: to make their signature dishes (at the Le Cordon Bleu college across the street) and present them in front of a large cinema audience. During the challenge, Ramsay scolded JP for finishing his dish with over 20 minutes remaining and forced to make it again (it would overcook if he tried to keep it warm for that long). For the first time ever, instead of giving 1 point to a perfect dish, Ramsay rated the dishes on a scale of 1–5. Notably good dishes included Fernando's pan-seared pigeon, and Roe's Kobe beef fillet (both four points), while notably poor dishes included Frank's filet mignon Bordelaise and JP's Boston-baked haddock and fingerling potatoes (1 point). JP was even threatened with elimination, as he was the only one to have to cook his dish twice; even then, the fish was overcooked and the potatoes were undercooked. The final score was 24–23 in favor of the women, making it the fourth season in a row the women won the signature dish challenge. Reward/punishment: The women were rewarded with a dinner at the Hotel Bel-Air prepared by celebrity chef Wolfgang Puck while the men were taken to Hell's Kitchen and tasked to set up the dorms and organize the luggage from both teams. During the punishment, JR, who openly admitted that he "came to Hell's Kitchen to cook and live the good life", quit after carrying in a single box, earning his teammates' ire. Service: At opening night, actors Greg Grunberg, Scott Grimes, Eva LaRue, film director Paul Feig and former Bachelor Bob Guiney were in attendance. In addition, a tableside appetizer of prawn scampi was served by Denine and Sterling. The women turned in a nearly flawless performance, with the only notable error being Janai mistakenly serving 8 scallops for an order instead of 10. Ramsay called it by far the best-ever performance by a team on the opening night of a Hell's Kitchen season. The men's service, however, was a complete disaster. Aaron cooked bland risotto twice but recovered with help from Fernando. Steve did hold his own on the meat station, but JR and JP undercooked seafood and fish, resulting in both of them getting tossed out of service. Fernando took over the fish station, but also served raw halibut, so an irritated Ramsay kicked out all the men from the kitchen. Having served no entrees, the men lost and were forced to nominate two chefs for elimination. Elimination: The men nominated Aaron and JP, while also considering Fernando and JR. Ramsay eliminated JP for his general ineptitude in both the signature dish challenge and the service, in addition to attempting to blame Aaron for the failure of the men's service. JP's comment: "I'm very disappointed in myself, but I know I'm a great chef. So I still stick to my guns and think that Aaron tanked our kitchen. This ain't gonna be the last time you see me." Ramsay's comment: "Everyone in Hell's Kitchen starts at the bottom. Unfortunately, JP stayed there."
188	2	"17 Chefs Compete"	September 10, 2014	4.21
Team challenge: The teams were brought outside, where a series of sand sculptures had been set up. Ramsay revealed that buried in each sculpture were several geoducks and for the first part of the challenge, teams must collect as many as possible. The men retrieved 12 to the women's 10, so they would have more to work with in the next part, which involved creating a geoduck sashimi dish. Ramsay stipulated that each dish had to weigh between 199 and 201 g (7.02 and 7.09 oz) and that the first team to 15 dishes would win. The women narrowly won their second challenge in a row, thanks to efforts from Roe and Kalen. Reward/punishment: The women had lunch on a luxury yacht with Ramsay and spent the afternoon relaxing on the beach. The men received multiple punishments, which included cleaning up all leftover sand from the challenge, eating a lunch of boiled salt cod with a gefilte fish sauce, then preparing the geoduck special, as well as setting both kitchens for that night's service. Service: Actress Teri Polo attended service. Aaron and Kalen served geoduck chowder tableside. The men had another poor service; despite Bryant putting in a good performance on the appetizers, Steve served raw halibut and boiled scallops, while Fernando and Sterling undercooked lamb and pork. The team managed to get some entrees out, but Ramsay threw them out after Sterling revealed that he was four minutes behind on a pork loin entree. The women were unable to repeat their performance of the previous episode; Janai served overcooked risottos and refused to give accurate times, which caused Denine to undercook scallops and lobster. The women finished the appetizers after a meeting in the pantry. Jennifer and La Tasha got their meats out perfectly, but the women were thrown out after Denine undercooked salmon. Disappointed with both teams, Ramsay asked them to nominate two chefs each for elimination. Elimination: The women nominated Denine and Janai. Sterling nominated himself for the men and despite suggestions for Steve to be nominated, Bryant persuaded the others to put up Fernando. Ramsay eliminated Janai for being the women's worst performer in both of the first two services. Janai's comment: "I definitely feel like Chef Ramsay made a mistake. Nobody in that kitchen is better than me. Chef Ramsay may not know it, but, in all honesty, it's his loss that he didn't get a chance to see that." Ramsay's comment: "Cooking risotto is elementary. But tonight, I found out Janai is still in kindergarten."
189	3	"16 Chefs Compete"	September 17, 2014	3.96
Team challenge: Ramsay told teams they had to improve their communication if they wanted to improve in services. he therefore gave each chef a jacket with a recipe printed on the back, which they would have to cook after their teammates read the recipes to them. La Tasha beat Santos on enchiladas despite misidentifying her dish as meat pie, Katie and Steve both scored on frittata, and Aaron beat Ashley on shepherd's pie, tying the score at 2. Denine beat JR on burgers, Bryant beat Kalen on lobster spring rolls and Jennifer and Sterling both scored on lettuce wraps, tying the score at 4. Frank beat Sade on spaghetti and meatballs, and Fernando beat Roe on empanadas after a miscommunication with Ashley, giving the men a 6–4 win. Reward/punishment: The men went ziplining in Venice Beach, before having a special lunch served by Marino on the roof of the Erwin Hotel. The women, in addition to prepping both kitchens, had to take in a 500-pound delivery of coffee beans, before grinding the beans down for that night's filet steak special. Service: Talk show host Wendy Williams, reality TV creator Shaunie O'Neal and actress Elisabeth Röhm were special guests. A tableside appetizer of coffee-crusted filet mignon was served by Fernando and Roe. Both teams flew through appetizers without any trouble only to get stalled immediately on the entrees. Bryant served overcooked halibut on the first table and undercooked his next attempt, getting thrown out along with Sterling, his partner on that station. The men got entrees out after Steve took over fish, but Frank was removed for burning Brussels sprouts and bringing up chicken garnish early. Fernando got confused on table service, but managed to recover and the team was able to complete the service. For the women, Kalen undercooked lamb, but recovered and got her first entrees out, but on Williams' table Kalen overcooked chicken and La Tasha served raw salmon, which prompted Ramsay to throw the entire team out. Despite having chefs ejected, the men were named the winners for finishing their first service, and the women had to nominate two chefs for elimination. Elimination: The women nominated Kalen and Denine. Ramsay eliminated Denine for her bad attitude and succession of poor performances. Ramsay gave no comment on Denine's elimination. Denine's comment: "They couldn't even use my cooking against me. They used my lack of experience. They're a bunch of bitches. And I hope to God that they underestimate those boys like they've been underestimating me, because they're gonna get smacked in the fucking face." Jennifer's collapse: Following Denine's elimination, Jennifer suddenly passed out in the dorms, resulting in the rest of her team calling for a medic and the episode ending in a cliffhanger.
190	4	"15 Chefs Compete"	September 24, 2014	3.68
During the recap of the previous episode, Denine's jacket was hung and her photo was burned. Jennifer's collapse - continued: Jennifer returned after revealing that her collapse was due to dehydration. Team challenge: The teams were called to witness a culinary school graduation ceremony. They were tasked with serving brunch to the graduates and their families. Both teams pushed out the appetizers quickly and moved on to entrees. The women's crepes fell apart, but they recovered. Bryant served bland spinach and raw eggs for the Florentines twice. The men were out of sync, but Sterling started directing them and brought them back together. The women narrowly completed service first and won the challenge. Reward/punishment: The women flew to San Francisco, where they went on a trolley tour and had lunch at Chef Dominique Crenn's restaurant, Atelier Crenn. The men had to grind and stuff chorizo sausages for the next service. Service: Actor Nestor Serrano, actor/singer Kendall Schmidt, TV host Adam Ferrara, NBA star Chris Bosh and members of the WNBA team Los Angeles Sparks attended this service. The teams started off well on hot appetizers despite Ashley serving too many portions of risotto for two orders of scallops. Steve brought up the appetizers too early, and served a soupy risotto, despite Sterling's warning. Kalen and Roe overcooked scallops twice and were forced to eat them by Chef Ramsay. Fernando and Santos' halibut went to waste because JR served raw pork. Thanks to JR's inconsistencies, Santos served overcooked and raw salmon to the Sparks. After JR and Frank served raw lamb for Bosh's table, Ramsay threw out both of them as well as Santos and Fernando on fish. The women won for finishing their service with no one thrown out. Elimination: The men nominated JR and Steve. Ramsay was puzzled that Steve was nominated despite not getting thrown out, so he added Frank for taking a backseat during service. Ramsay eliminated JR for failing to show any growth or assertiveness in any of the four services. JR's comment: "Chef Ramsay is disappointed, because he expected me to lead that station. I could have been more vocal, but I'm not the type to yell over everybody, so I just stay quiet. Sterling, keep it 100. I still love you, but the rest of y'all could just fuck off and keep stabbing each other in the back." Ramsay's comment: "I waited for JR to wake up and find his voice, but he never did. And so I let him sleepwalk out of here."
191	5	"14 Chefs Compete"	October 1, 2014	3.89
Team challenge: The teams were each given five dishes cooked with unusual proteins, and told to divide into three pairs plus one individual (which ended up being Sade and Aaron), who would taste each dish and identify which protein was used. Additionally, each team would have one pair go twice. Whoever did this in the shortest amount of time would win. The women finished in 7 minutes and 41 seconds despite Katie and Roe's slow section. Bryant and Frank identified elk in one attempt and Sterling, on the sidelines, immediately identified alligator as Aaron's protein. Although Santos and Fernando, who went twice, took a long time to identify their final protein, ultimately finished with 34 seconds to spare, giving the men their second challenge win. Reward/punishment: The men spent the day at the Annenberg Community Beach House in Santa Monica, where they met and played with former water polo champions Genai Kerr, Shea Buckner, and Tumua Anae. The women had to bring in pizza ingredients for that night's family service and hand-grate the cheese. They also had protein shakes consisting of boiled chicken, anchovies, scallops, and hard-boiled eggs for lunch. Service: Ramsay's mother, Helen Cosgrove, comedian Jim Jefferies, singer/dancer Asia Monet Ray and TV personality Mary Murphy were in attendance for family night. The two teams each ran a "make your own pizza" station in the dining room, manned by Fernando, Santos, Ashley, and Jennifer. The men had a relatively trouble-free service despite some initial speed bumps due to the slowness of the pizza station and Aaron serving raw scallops on the last table of appetizers. For the women, Katie and Kalen overcooked capellini and Kalen then struggled to keep up with the orders of appetizers and to communicate with Sade on fish; eventually, La Tasha took control of the station. On entrees, Roe forgot to bring cauliflower and fries that were on order, resulting in the men finishing five tables ahead of the women. Ramsay requested the women to nominate two chefs for elimination based on overall performance, not just this service. Elimination: The women nominated Kalen and Katie. Ramsay asked Katie who their weakest two members were, likely expecting her to nominate Roe. Katie hesitated before ultimately sticking with the initial decision. Ramsay nevertheless eliminated Kalen, who was unanimously singled out as the team's weakest link when Ramsay polled the rest of the team. Kalen's comment: "I never, ever, in my wildest dreams, thought that I would get kicked off for doing well, but I'm gonna walk away from here, staying true to myself. Red team, good luck. Karma's a bitch. You better watch your backs, because nobody's got it." Ramsay's comment: "In Kalen's mind, her performance was flawless and every dish she cooked was perfect. Unfortunately for her, I live in reality. Dream on, Kalen."
192	6	"13 Chefs Compete"	October 8, 2014	3.82
Team challenge: The teams met outside Hell's Kitchen, where an animal pen had been set up. Each team was split into pairs and asked to catch an animal (lamb, pork, or veal) and then choose a side to go with the protein. Sterling sat out the collecting portion but decided to cook pork along with Aaron and Santos. Everyone would cook their own dish with that protein, and each team had to present their best dish of each type of protein to Ramsay and chefs Jon Shook and Vinny Dotolo, who would each award between 1 and 5 stars. The women took an early lead, with La Tasha beating Fernando 11 to 10 on veal, and Sade beating Steve 10 to 9 on lamb. Sterling also got 9 on pork, giving Roe the upper hand. Unfortunately, her pork chop was too sweet and had the wrong garnish, scoring just 4 stars, giving the men a 28–25 victory. Reward/punishment: The men visited a vineyard in Santa Barbara where they enjoyed a gourmet lunch, before Marino joined them and demonstrated wine-tasting techniques. The women had to prepare stock for the next night's service, which involved sawing up bones, draining the marrow, and then returning to the stock pots every half-hour to strain and stir it. Service: South Park co-creator Trey Parker was a guest in addition to members of the Dine LA board of directors: Yuta Tsunoda, Jimmy Shaw, Aidan Demarest, David Lefevre, Sang Yoon, John Sedlar and Susan Feniger. Olympic gold medalist Allyson Felix and Los Angeles Kings defenseman Willie Mitchell sat at the Red and Blue Team's chef tables. Frank and La Tasha served tableside salads. The men got through appetizers without trouble, despite Steve needing Ramsay to show him how to cook the scallops properly. On entrees, Steve served raw halibut and Santos forgot an order of lamb and undercooked wellington. Ramsay eventually threw them out serving a ribeye with no sauce. Afterwards, the men eventually pulled together and completed service. For the women, Katie forgot a lobster and let her scallops get stuck to the pan. She and Roe were thrown out for serving raw scallops and a garlicky risotto for Felix at the chef's table. Ashley took over the fish station, only to be thrown out for overcooking scallops. Ramsay declared no winning team, despite both teams finishing service. He told each team to nominate two chefs for elimination, emphasizing that they were to consider overall performance, not just this service. Elimination: The men immediately decided on Sterling and Steve. The women on the other hand were unable to come to a decision, before ultimately deciding on Katie and Roe when pressured by Ramsay. Ramsay eliminated Katie for her lack of confidence but praised her cooking ability. He gave no comment on Katie's elimination. Katie's comment: "I most definitely could've handled Chef Ramsay. It was just the girls I couldn't handle. Maybe I should've taken a chance of getting my eyes scratched out. I let strong personalities overcome me, and it sucks." Ramsay pointed to one of the other three nominees (who was not shown on-screen) and told them to remove their jacket, leaving that chef's fate in the competition unknown as the episode ended in a cliffhanger.
193	7	"12 Chefs Compete"	October 15, 2014	3.67
During the recap of the previous episode, Katie's jacket was hung and her photo was burned. Team change: After Katie's elimination, Ramsay told Sterling to remove his jacket and join the women to even out the numbers, as the men were no longer confident in his abilities on the blue team. Team challenge: The teams arrived in the dining room to find a giant map of Italy, spotlighting the country's well-known cuisine. Behind the map was a group of opera group. Certain chefs from would choose an opponent from the other team, who would then choose a scroll bearing the name of a dish. Celestino Drago, the owner-chef of Drago Central, was brought in as a guest judge for this challenge. Jennifer beat Steve on tortellini, Fernando won on saltimbocca due to Ashley incorrectly using basil rather than sage, neither Aaron nor Sade earned a point for their linguine dishes since neither was remarkable. La Tasha beat Santos on spaghetti carbonara, while Frank beat Roe on cheese manicotti. Bryant's fettucine alfredo was criticized for being over-sized and over-complicated, but Sterling's choice of fire roasted peppers made his dish seem more Southern than Italian, giving the blue team a 3–2 win. Reward/punishment: The blue team were each given $500 for a shopping spree at American Rag Cie, before having lunch at Cecconi's Restaurant. The red team had to prepare both kitchens for Italian night, including breaking down squid for a squid ink tagliatelle and making pasta by hand. Service: A delegation from the Italian consulate, including Consulate General Giuseppe Perrone, attended this service, in addition to award-winning recording artist Kelis and actors Louis Lombardi and Tony Denison. Bryant and Sade were assigned to serve a tableside clam cipollini. Steve got the blue team off to a bad start with a soupy risotto, while Frank served raw steak and overcooked chicken on the first table of entrées. Aaron fell behind on fish and shoved the others aside when they tried to help him. On the red team, Jennifer managed to get the appetizers out with no errors, but Sade's slow tableside service accident caused a ripple effect in the kitchen, as the team struggled to get time their orders correctly and Roe served raw steaks. When Ashley's calamari was returned from the consulate table for being undercooked, Ramsay threw the entire team out. Despite this, Ramsay refused to award the blue team a win due to major mistakes on every station, and ordered two nominees for elimination from each team. Elimination: The blue team nominated Aaron and Steve while also considering Frank. Similarly, the red team nominated Ashley and Roe while also considering Sade. Ramsay eliminated Ashley for the calamari mistake and making a poor case for her staying. He did not comment on her elimination. Ashley's comment: "I didn't expect to get eliminated tonight, because people have done way worse in this competition than I have. This is all I wanted to do. But I mean, Chef Ramsay obviously just thought that I wasn't good enough. And that's a terrible feeling." Following Ashley's elimination, Ramsay again announced that he was not done, marking the second episode in a row to end in a cliffhanger.
194	8	"11 Chefs Compete, Part 1"	November 5, 2014 (Note: The episode was originally scheduled to air on October 29, 2014, but Fox preempted it due to the ongoing of game 7 of the 2014 World Series.)	3.62
During the recap of the previous episode, Ashley's jacket was hung and her photo was burned. Team change: Ramsay announced further changes, sending Frank to the red team and Sade to the blue team. Team challenge: The teams met dogs and their trainers from the American Kennel Club. They had to create a tasting menu consisting of two appetizers and three entrees to be judged by a executive chefs Douglas Keane and Neal Fraser. The blue team dropped Sade's dish after she cooked a plate for the dogs themselves to eat. Sterling's crab cake appetizer topped Aaron's for the red team, while Fernando's prawn appetizer beat La Tasha's. Jennifer's Chilean sea bass beat Steve's, and Bryant's pork chop was favored over Roe's surf and turf. Both duck dishes had their flaws, but in the end, Frank's dish gave the red team a 3–2 win, beating out Santos' duck dish. Reward/punishment: The red team went on a trip to San Diego, where they watched various animals perform unique talents at SeaWorld, and had lunch at the Searsucker Restaurant. The blue team had to give the dogs baths, prep both kitchens, and set up a runway for Hell's Kitchen's first-ever dog show. Service: Ramsay stressed the importance of timing for this service, as the dog show was going to run in three acts. The appetizers were to be served after the first act and the show would not continue until all were served, and the same went for entrées after the second act. Both teams got off to a decent start, although in the blue kitchen, Fernando started cooking his scallops before Ramsay ordered them to be fired, and Frank had trouble preparing the Caesar salads. Both teams served all their appetizers, allowing the show to continue. On entrées, Sterling overcooked pork, prompting La Tasha to help him, while Steve confused Santos on garnish. On the last ticket for each kitchen, Santos served greasy garnish, Sterling overcooked another pork chop, Jennifer overcooked a salmon, and Roe served bland cauliflower, which halted the show. Eventually, both teams managed to complete service and the dog show concluded. Ramsay named the blue team the winners for finishing first by seconds, while asking the red team for two nominees for elimination. Elimination: The red team quickly decided on Frank as their first nominee but were torn between Sterling and Roe for the second, before ultimately deciding on Sterling. Ramsay decided not to eliminate anyone after having gotten their strongest overall service yet. Ramsay's comment: "Tonight, I finally got a respectable service. So I gave them a little respect and didn't send anyone home."
195	9	"11 Chefs Compete, Part 2"	November 12, 2014 (Note: The episode was originally scheduled to air on November 5, 2014, but having been preempted on the previous episode schedule of October 29.)	3.75
Team challenge: The chefs played the Hell's Kitchen craps challenge. Each had to roll a twelve-sided die and choose an ingredient starting with the corresponding letter. Before the challenge began, Ramsay revealed that the winner would get to spend the day and night in Las Vegas. Frank rolled twice due to the red team having one fewer member and picked difficult ingredients. Prior to the judging, Ramsay announced he would only taste one dish from each team. The red team quickly decided on La Tasha's pan-seared duck breast with heirloom tomato chutney while the blue team, after much contention, put up Bryant's Chilean sea bass with cauliflower puree and leeks. The red team won after Bryant undercooked his daikon. After the challenge, Ramsay tasted Sade's dish and thought it was better than Bryant's. Reward/punishment: The red team flew in a private jet to Las Vegas and spent the night in a luxury mega-suite at the Planet Hollywood Resort & Casino. They also had dinner at Ramsay's restaurant, Gordon Ramsay BurGR. Meanwhile, the blue team spent the day refilling the kitchen's ice machines, prepping a 65-pound halibut for the upcoming dinner service as well as taking a delivery of ingredients at 3:30 in the morning. Steve's exit: Steve strained his knee during the final part of the punishment and the soreness got even worse the next morning. The injury, possibly a muscular distension, required him to go to the hospital. Steve later returned before service. He was seen sitting quietly on the patio with a leg brace on his injured knee, but when Ramsay quickly visited Steve before starting the next dinner service, he informed him that he would have to leave for the rest of the season to recover much to Steve’s chagrin and disappointment, but gave him hope that he could possibly return for a future season on Hell’s Kitchen. Steve's comment: "I'm pissed. I have to leave because of my fucking leg. It's heartbreaking, telling Chef Ramsay I can't go any farther. I'm not gonna let this break me. I'm gonna get my knee fixed so I can get better and get back in the kitchen. Chef Ramsay definitely hasn't seen the last of me or heard of the last of me yet." Service: The service included VIP chef's table guests: Drummer Stewart Copeland of The Police, served by the Blue Team, and frontman Steven Tyler of Aerosmith served by the Red Team. Ex-Eagles band member Don Felder, and Baywatch star Gena Lee Nolin sat in the dining room. Sterling and Fernando served a tableside steak entrée. Both teams started out strongly with their appetizers, but Frank overcooked scallops and lobster, then forgot about the scallops while focusing on the lobster, which forced La Tasha to help him. The blue kitchen moved smoothly to entrees and completed their service seven tables ahead and prompted Ramsay to let the blue team help the red team finish service. The blue team were declared the winners, and red team had to select two nominees for elimination. Elimination: Ramsay initially asked the red team to nominate two chefs but immediately changed his mind and eliminated Frank without asking for a nomination, for being the only chef in either kitchen to perform poorly, despite Steve already being sent home earlier before service due to his severe knee injury. Frank's comment: "I feel sick to my stomach. The saddest part is that I didn't get to show Chef Ramsay I'm so much better than this, and that's what's really ripping me apart. But I still will always have the passion to do what I'm doing, and I still will succeed in life, doing what I do." Ramsay's comment: "Frank wrote me a letter with gratitude, and then, with his performance tonight, he wrote his ticket out of here. Ciao, Frank."
196	10	"9 Chefs Compete"	November 19, 2014	3.98
Team challenge: The chefs were greeted with an Indian Bollywood dance in the dining room. In the challenge, each team was presented with a tablet showing a list of four proteins next to a 15 puzzle showing 15 other ingredients and an empty space. Roe and Aaron were selected by their teams and given three minutes to rearrange their puzzles to produce a desired list of ingredients for each protein. To fill in the empty space, the chef who was assigned that protein (La Tasha for the red team, Bryant for the blue) was able to select one ingredient from the following: tomatoes, okra, saag paneer and green beans. The teams had 30 minutes to cook, after which the blue team, which had an extra member, chose to drop Santos' chicken dish in favor of Sade's. Ramsay and Michelin starred chef Sachin Chopra rated each dish on a scale from one to five. The teams were tied at 23 points each, with the highest scoring dish being the tiebreaker; Jennifer's eight points was the highest, and the red team won. Reward/punishment: The red team was rewarded with a spa day at Willow Spa in Santa Monica and each were gifted with Vitamix blenders. The blue team prepped both kitchens for the upcoming Indian night service and decorated the entrance to be themed. Service: ZZ Top guitarist/songwriter Billy Gibbons, actress Uzo Aduba, and actress/journalist Lisa Guerrero were guests for this service. The red team had a strong service except for Jennifer needing Sterling's help on flatbread and Roe starting a fire on the fish station. The blue team struggled as Bryant tried to help Aaron on fish but caused confusion by serving raw scallops and cold lobster, along with passing the blame to Aaron when confronted. Despite that, Sade cooked perfect wellingtons, but argued with Bryant and the table had to be sent incomplete due to Aaron's raw halibut. Later, Aaron sent another undercooked salmon, followed by cold garnish from Bryant. Ramsay, enraged by the service, asked the blue team to come up with two nominees, declaring the red team winners for their dominant performance. Elimination: The blue team nominated Aaron and Bryant. During elimination, Aaron expressed a desire to quit, and Ramsay allowed him to leave, marking the fifth voluntary exit in Hell's Kitchen history which Ramsay found disappointing. He then asked the remaining chefs if anyone else wanted to leave, and they all said they wanted to stay, before getting dismissed for the night. Aaron's comment: "When I first came to Hell's Kitchen, I wanted the executive chef spot, but this is one of the hardest things I've ever had to do in my life. Physically, mentally, emotionally, it's 10,000 times more difficult to cook in Hell's Kitchen than it is in any other situation." Ramsay's comment: "I found it quite strange that Aaron didn't even have the will to succeed. He clearly didn't belong in Hell's Kitchen."
197	11	"8 Chefs Compete"	November 26, 2014	3.48
Team challenge: The chefs were called outside for the annual Blind Taste Test. However, this year there was a twist, and two dunk tanks full of water were revealed to the teams. One chef from each team would sit over each tank, and another member from each team would taste; if the taster got three ingredients wrong, their teammate would be dunked once, and if they got all four wrong, their teammate would be dunked again. After four rounds, the teams were tied four apiece, with Bryant scoring three for the blue team. To break the tie, Bryant and Roe faced off a sudden-death round, but with no one on the tanks. Bryant missed fennel, but Roe identified it correctly, thus winning the challenge for the red team. Reward/punishment: The red team visited the Santa Monica Pier and had lunch at the Lobster Restaurant. The blue team had to clean the dorms and both kitchens. Pre-service: Hell's Kitchen hosted a private five-course dinner service to honor a select group of award-winning firefighters. Each team was tasked with cooking for one 12-top table and each chef would be assigned to lead a course, with the stipulation that all dishes from a course had to be served by both teams at the same time. Service: On the scallop risotto course, Roe seasoned the scallops early, drying them out, and also forgot to plate two portions. Meanwhile, Fernando fell two portions short of risotto for the twelve plates, but the issue was dealt with quickly. On the tuna nicoise course, Santos was too slow explaining the dish to the guests and annoyed his teammates with his hands-off leadership approach. During the salmon course, Sade overcooked all of the salmon while she was out introducing the dish. The red team did have enough salmon to recover, however. Sterling's lack of leadership meant that his teammates did almost everything for him. On the New York strip course, Bryant and La Tasha had no problems, except for Santos slicing meat incorrectly. Despite the guests satisfied, Ramsay himself was not. Owing to the numerous mistakes in both kitchens, Ramsay declared no winner and asked each team to come up with two nominees for elimination. Elimination: The red team nominated Sterling and Roe while also considering Jennifer. The blue team chose Fernando and Santos but also considered Sade. Ramsay eliminated Fernando, telling him he was not yet ready to lead a brigade. Fernando's comment: "It's surreal that I'm actually here, and there's people in there that haven't shown as much potential as I've shown. Bryant has a roller coaster of emotions going on in his head. Santos cannot make the right judgment. I have a lot more technique and passion and cooking techniques than any other person here." Ramsay's comment: "Fernando's cooking was adequate, but his leadership was lacking. Being my next head chef requires both."
198	12	"7 Chefs Compete"	December 3, 2014	3.60
Team challenge: The chefs had to make two servings of their own amuse-bouche for Ramsay and Epicurious editor-in-chief Tanya Steel, with each dish being scored on a scale of 1–5. The red team had an extra chef, so Sterling dropped his own dish. La Tasha's pan-seared scallops earned 7 points. Roe's seared ahi tuna earned only 4 points for being too salty. The blue team won 23–16 as Sade's pan-seared tuna with cabbage and passionfruit scored nine points. Sade's pan-seared tuna needed only 2 points to tie but scored 9 as the best dish of the day, giving her team a 23–16 win and ending her personal streak of seven consecutive losses. Reward/punishment: The blue team went on a helicopter trip to Catalina Island and had lunch at the Bluewater Avalon. The red team prepared 200 coconuts for the next dinner service's special, during which Jennifer realized she was allergic to coconuts and was rushed to the hospital after having trouble breathing. She returned in time for service the next day. Service: Actors Lorenzo Lamas, Colin Walker and the band Big Bad Voodoo Daddy were guests in addition to actor Lou Diamond Phillips and his wife, who were VIP guests. All the tables were served an amuse-bouche of ahi tuna. Both kitchens started strong on the appetizers, until Sterling served raw scallops. Sterling was reluctant to change stations, despite Ramsay's suggestion. Later, he overcooked the next portion of scallops, and was moved to the garnish station while Roe took over the fish station. Ramsay reprimanded Santos for bringing up burnt scallops for Phillips' table, and Jennifer got overwhelmed by the amount of meat on order, forcing Ramsay to flip a ticket, but both teams finished service with no one thrown out. Elimination: Ramsay told both teams that while it was not a bad service, he had already made a decision, eliminating Sterling immediately for being the weakest performer of the night, but praised him for his optimism, good attitude, and improvement throughout the competition and allowed him to keep his jacket, which led to an emotional goodbye for everyone. He was the second chef to be eliminated this season during a postmortem (after Frank in Episode 10) and the third in the 13 seasons of Hell's Kitchen, following Tennille from Season 6. Sterling also was paid a retrospective montage, the sixth non-black jacket chef to get one. He was also the third chef to not receive the walk of shame, after Louross Edralin from Season 4 and Joseph Tinnelly from Season 6. Sterling's comment: "100 is no longer a part of Hell's Kitchen, but I learned a whole lot. I was all happy-go-lucky at first. Some of the other chefs here told me I didn't deserve to be here. He made me come back even stronger. I had to make myself better, and I did that. And on top of that, I got so many wins in challenges. I'm a leader. It took me coming way to California to realize that. I might not have won Hell's Kitchen, but I got something nobody in Hell's Kitchen have never accomplished; I got Chef Ramsay's heart." Ramsay then asked both teams to come up with one nominee for elimination, which turned out to be Santos and Roe. Ramsay called down the six remaining chefs one by one and eventually gave each of them a black jacket. Ramsay's comment: "Sterling went further in this competition than I thought he would. And even though he was always at 100, it wasn't enough to earn him a black jacket."
199	13	"6 Chefs Compete"	December 10, 2014	3.86
Challenge: The chefs were all tasked with making a steak entree, which would be judged by Ramsay and Bruce and Todd Simon, the fifth-generation owners of Omaha Steaks. However, the dishes would be first ranked by appearance, and only the top three would be tasted. Those three were Sade, Santos and Roe. Roe's ribeye and filet was deemed delicious. Sade's dish was criticized for the use of cinnamon. Santos' dish was also deemed to be perfect in appearance and taste but came in as a close second. Reward/punishment: Roe was rewarded with a photoshoot for an Omaha Steaks billboard campaign, featuring her winning dish, followed by a $1,000 kitchen equipment shopping spree at Surfas. The other chefs had to prep a huge side of beef, with each section weighing over 200 pounds. Service: In that night's dinner service, the team would be competing against sous-chefs James, Andi, and Ramsay himself. Magician Penn Jillette and NBA player Steve Blake were guests. Ramsay's team did a strong job and finished quickly. On the black team, Santos over-seasoned Caesar salads and La Tasha overcooked scallops and undercooked lobster tail, but thanks to Bryant's strong performance, the team recovered. On entrées, Roe undercooked her own ribeye dish and sliced it against everyone else's advice while refusing Santos' help. Santos was also criticized for running around doing nothing. In the end, Ramsay's team finished five tables ahead of the black team, whom he further berated for their uneven performance and problems with communication and listening. In a now incredibly rare occasion, Ramsay deemed Bryant to be the Best of the Worst and instructed him to nominate two chefs for elimination. Elimination: Bryant, while briefly considering La Tasha, nominated Santos and Roe. Ramsay eliminated Santos for being nominated for the third service in a row as well as his inability to keep fighting back even more. Santos is the first black jacket chef since Josh Wahler from Season 3 (who was eliminated during service) whose elimination was not paid in retrospective montage. Santos's comment: "I feel Chef Ramsay made a horrible decision. I give everything I have every day, and to go out the way I did, I'm pissed off right now. But, being in Hell's Kitchen, I've learned so much. I got a black jacket, so I'm very proud of myself." Ramsay's comment: "Santos dodged a bullet in the last two nominations, but tonight, there was nowhere to hide."
200	14	"5 Chefs Compete"	December 10, 2014	3.86
After Santos' elimination, Ramsay talked to Bryant privately and stated that he liked that Bryant was improving immensely and urged him to continue performing at the same caliber. Bryant took this to heart and stated that he wouldn't let Ramsay down. Challenge: The five chefs were brought to a local park, where they were tasked to make tableside meals for 40 glampers. During the cooking, La Tasha got stressed out, did not talk to the glampers, fell behind the other chefs and was the last to finish. When the votes were counted, Bryant was announced as the winner, with Roe ending up second. Reward/punishment: Bryant was rewarded with an overnight glamping trip at the Los Angeles Athletic Club and chose Sade to join him, as he wanted to find out what her weaknesses were. The others were sent to the Hollywood Hills to scoop dog feces and back to Hell's Kitchen to separate organics from recyclables, during which La Tasha had a very hard time keeping herself from vomiting. Service: TV host LeVar Burton, actors Keegan-Michael Key, Bellamy Young, musical artist Mayer Hawthorne and members of the Coast Guard were in attendance. The service got off to a bumpy start when Jennifer was scolded for not asking Roe for help on the fish station, which she eventually did, but sent up two raw lobster tails. Meanwhile, Bryant sent up a bland scallop salad with water in it. Jennifer later forgot the clam garnish for the halibut on order and cooked halibut too early due to a miscommunication with Sade. Sade's perfectly cooked lamb could not be sent because Roe sent up under-seasoned garnish twice and Ramsay could not flip the order. On the next attempt, Roe finished on time with the garnish, but Sade's lamb was undercooked. Ramsay was disappointed by the final five's performance and asked them to come up with two for elimination based on everything that had happened throughout the season. Elimination: The black jackets Roe and Jennifer were nominated. Ramsay eliminated Roe for several consecutive rocky performances but acknowledged her hard work. Roe's comment: "I definitely do not see myself as a weaker chef than Jennifer. I'm really proud of myself for what I've done here. I won the steaks challenge, I've had some amazing services, but I think past mistakes have haunted me. I definitely think Jennifer should be standing here right now, and I know in the back of my head, I'm just gonna wake up every day and thank God I'm not her." Ramsay's comment: "Roe thought she would row, row, row herself into the final four, but her performance tonight in the kitchen put her up a creek with no paddles."
201	15	"4 Chefs Compete"	December 17, 2014	3.62
Challenge: The chefs' loved ones showed up on a television screen, including Bryant's wife and daughter; La Tasha's mother; Jennifer's fiancé, son, and daughter; and Sade's mother and aunt. They (as well as La Tasha's father) then appeared in the dining room where they enjoyed a brief family reunion. Ramsay then introduced the Taste it, Now Make it challenge. Everyobe correctly identified the starch as couscous, but Sade and Jennifer were the only two to correctly identify the protein as rabbit. Jennifer won by identifying sun-dried tomatoes in the sauce, as Sade had used cherries. Reward/punishment: Jennifer went with her fiancé and kids to lunch at Mr. Chow, followed by chocolate tasting at Vosges. The others had to clean out and pack the dorms and set up the dining room. Service: Just like Hell's Kitchen's 100th dinner service, the 200th service was a black-tie affair. VIP guests included Season 3 winner Rock Harper, Season 10 winner Christina Wilson, Season 7 runner-up Jay Santos, Season 11 third-place finisher Jon Scallion and Season 9 third-place finisher Elise Wims, actor Ricky Schroder, award-winning recording artists Hanson, Olympic gold medalist Sydney Leroux and singer Kelly Hansen were also dining as guests as well. First, Sade ran the pass; when Sade asked Jennifer how long on the chicken, the latter was slow to reply, eventually burning the chicken skin. However, Sade managed to spot Andi putting clams instead of mussels in the capellini and Marino giving her a ticket with a pork chop, which wasn't on the menu. La Tasha failed to notice the difference between a sea bass and a halibut but called out Bryant for being slow on mashed potatoes before undercooking them and showing disrespect towards her. Jennifer was the third to run the pass; Sade got confused when Jennifer called out an order and the team was slow to give her a time on their respective stations. Jennifer failed to notice the missing duxelles in the wellingtons, but rebounded by keeping entrées moving at a consistent pace. Bryant mistook the two halibut for two sea bass while looking for Andi's sabotage, causing a brief argument between him and Ramsay. He did, however, notice the difference between cauliflower and celery root puree and successfully completed the dinner service. Ramsay praised the chefs for their strong performances and sent them upstairs while he decided on the final two. When the chefs were out on the patio, La Tasha was annoyed at Bryant running his egotism. Elimination: Jennifer was eliminated first, but as she surrendered her jacket, Ramsay praised her for her determination and told her that she would have a successful future ahead. Jennifer's elimination wasn't paid in a retrospective montage. Ramsay asked the final three to plead why they should be in the final two, before choosing La Tasha and Bryant and eliminating Sade. Unlike the other chefs who came in third place, Sade had to surrender her jacket. However, Ramsay revealed plans to have one of his associates in London call Sade for a job offer with the Gordon Ramsay Group as a reward for her hard work. Ramsay did not comment on Jennifer or Sade's eliminations. Jennifer's comment: "I wouldn't have come here if I didn't think I was winning this. I'm more determined and passionate than anybody else. This was not supposed to be the end." Sade's comment: "It sucks to be eliminated, especially when you think that you're doing so well. This was not an easy journey, but I still feel like I remained true to myself. I did well in challenges. I made it to the black team. As much as I wanted to win, making it this far, I couldn't have asked for more."
202	16	"Winner Chosen"	December 17, 2014	3.60
Bryant and La Tasha started working on their menus. While Bryant kept his menu very simple, La Tasha decided to take a more adventurous approach to hers. The next day, they were invited to a day of relaxation in Palm Springs by Ramsay and accompanied by Marino. Challenge: When Bryant and La Tasha returned to Los Angeles they were greeted by a woman from the airport who told them that their ride had not arrived yet, but they were escorted to a room where they were greeted by a cheering crowd and given their final challenge; they needed to cook five unique dishes: one cold appetizer and hot appetizer, as well as a beef, chicken, and fish entree, in front of a live audience and had only one hour with the assistance of Sous Chefs Andi and James. La Tasha won the challenge 42–39, which included a perfect 10 on her chicken entrée. Reward: La Tasha got the first pick of the last eight chefs eliminated. (Note: Aaron was not allowed to return as he quit the competition and Steve could not take his place as he still had his knee injury. Therefore, Ashley came in Aaron's place instead, as the last chef eliminated prior to those two.) La Tasha picked Sade, Roe, Fernando and Ashley, while Bryant picked Jennifer, Sterling, Santos, and was left with Frank. This didn’t surprise Frank due to his awful last dinner service performance. Service: During pre-service, Frank burned all of Bryant’s nuts, an item he added after a suggestion from Sterling and Frank, and they needed to redo them all over. During the tasting of both menus, Ramsay gave mostly positive feedback to Bryant’s menu but critiqued several of La Tasha's dishes for having too many elements on the plates, a problem that was quickly rectified. In addition to the finalists' families, comedian/actress Margaret Cho, actresses Aisha Tyler, Sharon Lawrence, Traci Bingham and TV host Tory Belleci also appeared as guests. Frank almost immediately stalled Bryant's kitchen by overcooking tagliatelle and shrimp, so Bryant switched him with Sterling on the garnish station. In La Tasha's kitchen Roe served up too little garnish for the first ticket, but rebounded. Fernando was slow on his scallops and struggled to call back times on his sea bass, with Ramsay even accusing him of trying to sabotage La Tasha. After he served up raw salmon, La Tasha swapped him with Roe on hot appetizers, and the rest of La Tasha's service went without incident. The same could not be said for Bryant's kitchen as Frank was now burning garnish and giving inaccurate times, forcing Bryant to throw him out – a decision that Ramsay agreed with. Winner: Ramsay congratulated the chefs for a complete service and told them that it would be a "virtually impossible decision" to determine a winner. After analyzing the service and overall performance, he called both of them into his office where he praised La Tasha for her consistency and Bryant for his strong finish despite some of the setbacks earlier in the service. After that, he asked them to go to their doors where La Tasha’s opened making her the thirteenth winner of Hell's Kitchen; Bryant took his defeat graciously. In the closing segment, Ramsay went on to shake hands with Frank and asked him what happened during the service. Bryant's comment: "I worked so hard. I just couldn't come away with that win. But, La Tasha, congratulations. You obviously deserve it." La Tasha's comment: "Oh, my gosh! I won! I'm pinching myself. I'm slapping myself. Is this really happening? If I'm dreaming, please don't wake me up. This is the most incredible feeling of my life. And having my parents there, sharing that with me, priceless." Ramsay's comment: "La Tasha has all the right ingredients to be a great chef. She's creative, a strong leader, has great attention to detail and has an outstanding palate. But the thing I love most about La Tasha is her determination. I know that she's ready for the challenge of being my head chef in Atlantic City, and I couldn't be happier."

== Epilogue ==
Two chefs from this season later appeared on the Food Network show Chopped. Frank was on the season 37 episode "A Frog Leg Up." Here, he was chopped (eliminated) in the entrée round after serving undercooked gnocchi to the judges. Roe appeared on the season 41 episode "Holy Bologna!" and was chopped after the dessert round.
