= Ekaterina Shakalova =

Ukrainian mixed martial artist (born 1997)

- Born: August 31, 1997 (age 29); Donetsk, Ukraine
- Height: 158 cm (5 ft 2 in)
- Weight: 125 lb (57 kg; 8 st 13 lb)
- Division: Flyweight
- Reach: 63 in (160 cm)
- Fighting out of: Kharkiv, Ukraine
- Team: Honour Academy
- Years active: 2019–present

Mixed martial arts record
- Total: 13
- Wins: 9
- By knockout: 1
- By submission: 5
- By decision: 3
- Losses: 4
- By submission: 2
- By decision: 2

Other information
- Mixed martial arts record from Sherdog

Ekaterina Shakalova (Note: Ukrainian: Катерина Вікторівна Шакалова) (born August 31, 1997) is a Ukrainian professional mixed martial artist who competes in the women's flyweight division of the Professional Fighters League (PFL). A professional since 2019, she previously competed in Bellator MMA.

== Professional mixed martial arts career ==
=== Early career ===
Shakalova made her mixed martial arts debut on June 29, 2016, at Road To WWFC 22. In the main event, she faced Anna Bidenko, winning the bout by submission with a brabo choke in the 2nd round. In her second professional fight at WWFC 16, Shakalova suffered her first defeat, losing by triangle choke with her arms to Daria Chibisova. On June 18, 2020, at Madabattle Martial Arts Festival 1, Shakalova faced Zoya Litvinenko, winning the bout by technical knockout. A few months later, during the next edition of this gala, she submitted Marina Stakhalskaya in the 1st round.

On February 12, 2021, Shakalova fought one fight at Babilon MMA, facing Róża Gumienna. She won the fight by unanimous decision, dominating her opponent over the distance of three rounds.

=== Fight Exclusive Night ===
Making her Fight Exclusive Night debut, Shakalova faced Izabela Badurek on March 27, 2021, at FEN 33: Lotos Fight Night Warsaw. After three rounds, she won the bout by unanimous. The victory was rewarded with a financial bonus for the performance of the evening.

Shakalova fought Jamila Sandora at FEN 34: Totalbet Fight Night on May 28, 2021. She won the fight in the second round, submitting her opponent with a rear-naked choke.

Shakalova faced Yulia Kutsenko for the FEN Women's Bantamweight Championship on January 22, 2022, at FEN 38: Lotos Fight Night. She won the bout in the first round by submission to become the inaugural champion.

Shakalova was scheduled to make her first defense of the FEN bantamweight championship belt, where she was to face Suvia Salmimies on August 27, 2022, in the main event of the FEN 41: Tauron Fight Night Mrągowo. She failed to meet the weight limit and was stripped of her championship belt and the fight was canceled.

=== Bellator MMA ===
On December 13, 2022, Bellator MMA announced on its official website the signing of a contract with Shakalova, arguing that it wanted to strengthen the women's featherweight division. Shakalova made her debut for the promotion on August 11, 2023, at Bellator 298, where she faced Dayana Silva. She won the bout by split decision, with the judges scoring the following: 29–28, 28–29, and 30–27.

Shakalova faced Aspen Ladd on May 17, 2024, at Bellator Champions Series 2. She lost the fight by unanimous decision.

=== Professional Fighters League ===
In the quarterfinal of the 2025 PFL Women's Flyweight Tournament, Juliana Velasquez was scheduled to face Taila Santos on April 11, 2025, at PFL 2. However, Santos withdrew from the tournament and was replaced by Ekaterina Shakalova. Shakalova won the fight via rear-naked choke in round one.

In the semifinals, Shakalova faced Jena Bishop. She lost the fight via a rear-naked choke submission in the second round.

Skakalova faced Velasquez in a rematch at PFL 9 on August 15, 2025. She lost the fight by unanimous decision.

== Championships and accomplishments ==
- Fight Exclusive Night
  - FEN Women's Bantamweight Championship (one time)
- Cageside Press
  - 2022 Women's Bantamweight Prospect of the Year

== Mixed martial arts record ==
Professional record breakdown
13 matches	9 wins	4 losses
By knockout	1	0
By submission	5	2
By decision	3	2

Res.	Record	Opponent	Method	Event	Date	Round	Time	Location	Notes
Loss	9–4	Juliana Velasquez	Decision (unanimous)	PFL 9 (2025)	August 15, 2025	3	5:00	Charlotte, North Carolina, United States	
Loss	9–3	Jena Bishop	Submission (rear-naked choke)	PFL 6 (2025)	June 20, 2025	2	2:07	Wichita, Kansas, United States	2025 PFL Women's Flyweight Tournament Semifinal.
Win	9–2	Juliana Velasquez	Submission (rear-naked choke)	PFL 2 (2025)	April 11, 2025	1	2:05	Orlando, Florida, United States	Flyweight debut. 2025 PFL Women's Flyweight Tournament Quarterfinal.
Loss	8–2	Aspen Ladd	Decision (unanimous)	Bellator Champions Series 2	May 17, 2024	3	5:00	Paris, France	
Win	8–1	Dayana Silva	Decision (split)	Bellator 298	August 11, 2023	3	5:00	Sioux Falls, South Dakota, United States	Featherweight debut.
Win	7–1	Yulia Kutsenko	Submission (rear-naked choke)	Fight Exclusive Night 38	January 22, 2022	1	2:00	Ostrów Wielkopolski, Poland	Won the inaugural FEN Women's Bantamweight Championship.
Win	6–1	Jamila Sandora	Submission (rear-naked choke)	Fight Exclusive Night 34	May 28, 2021	2	2:42	Warsaw, Poland	
Win	5–1	Izabela Badurek	Decision (unanimous)	Fight Exclusive Night 33	March 27, 2021	3	5:00	Łódź, Poland	
Win	4–1	Róża Gumienna	Decision (unanimous)	Babilon MMA 19	February 12, 2021	3	5:00	Warsaw, Poland	
Win	3–1	Marina Stakhalskaya	Submission (armbar)	Madabattle Martial Arts Festival 2	November 27, 2020	1	?	Kharkiv, Ukraine	
Win	2–1	Zoya Litvinenko	TKO (punches)	Madabattle Martial Arts Festival 1	June 18, 2020	1	4:37	Kharkiv, Ukraine	
Loss	1–1	Daria Chibisova	Submission (triangle choke)	WWFC 16	November 2, 2019	1	N/A	Kharkiv, Ukraine	
Win	1–0	Anna Bidenko	Submission (brabo choke)	Road to WWFC 22	June 29, 2019	2	4:02	Mykolaiv, Ukraine	Bantamweight debut. Won the WWFC Women's Bantamweight Championship.

== See also ==
- List of female mixed martial artists
- List of current PFL fighters
