= Diana Avsaragova =

Russian mixed martial artist

- Born: Диана Авсарагова; August 7, 1998 (age 28); Ardon, North Ossetia–Alania, Russia
- Other names: Pantera
- Height: 5 ft 7 in (1.70 m)
- Weight: 128 lb (58 kg; 9 st 2 lb)
- Division: Flyweight
- Reach: 65 1/2 in (166 cm)
- Style: Freestyle wrestling
- Stance: Orthodox
- Fighting out of: Grozny, Russia
- Team: Akhmat Fight Club
- Years active: 2017–present

Mixed martial arts record
- Total: 8
- Wins: 6
- By knockout: 1
- By submission: 1
- By decision: 4
- Losses: 2
- By submission: 1
- By decision: 1

Other information
- Mixed martial arts record from Sherdog

Diana Avsaragova (Russian: Диана Авсарагова; born August 7, 1998) is a Russian mixed martial artist who competes in the Women's Flyweight division of the Bellator MMA.

== Background ==
Diana was born on August 7, 1998, in Ardon, North Ossetia. Her father was a wrestler, but ended his career early due to a knee injury. Her mother also wanted to go into sports, but her family did not allow her to do so, so when Diana grew up, her mother herself suggested that she take up wrestling. In subsequent years, Avsaragova repeatedly performed at the championships of Moscow (eight times winning gold) and the country, in the division up to 63 kg and below, moreover, both in the junior category and in the adult category. She was even taken to Canada, where the athlete also became a champion. Having given seven years of her life to wrestling, Diana reached the level of a master of sports, but eventually realized that this type of martial arts had become boring for her. She trained both in North Ossetia and in Moscow. In the capital, she spent five years in a special boarding house for fighters, and then returned home.

In 2014 and 2015, Diana became the bronze medalist of the Russian championship in freestyle wrestling among girls in the category up to 60 kg.

== Mixed martial arts career ==
=== Early career ===
At the Emir Fighting Championship tournament, which took place in December 2017, Jojua fought for the championship belt, and she managed to agree with the organizers to include Avsaragova in the card - everyone was satisfied. The former participant of the wrestling battles was also matched with a debutante, Alina Makarova, who lasted less than two minutes, falling into the armbar. It seemed that such a bright performance promises Diana a bright future, but she soon suffered a knee injury and dropped out of competitive sports until 2019.

After rehabilitation and preparation, Diana performed at the Titan Global Championship, against Anna Lurchenkova, with whom they had a full three-round duel. Having won another victory, the native of Nart got a manager who began to look for interesting offers for her. Some Russian leagues, as well as Invicta FC, considered Avsaragova's candidacy, but due to the pandemic, her next fights were canceled.

=== Bellator MMA ===
In December 2019, she signed a six-fight contract with Bellator MMA.

In her Bellator debut at Bellator 256 on April 9, 2021, Avsaragova defeated Tara Graff in 29-seconds via knockout.

Avsaragova faced Gabriella Gulfin on July 16, 2021, at Bellator 262. She won the bout via split decision. 4 out of 4 media scores gave it to Diana.

Avsaragova was scheduled to face Ashley Deen on March 12, 2022, at Bellator 276. The week of the event, Deen tested positive for COVID-19 and was replaced by Kyra Batara. Avsaragova won the bout via unanimous decision.

Avsaragova faced Alejandra Lara on February 4, 2023, at Bellator 290. At the weigh-ins, Avsaragova missed weight for her bout, coming in at 128.8 pounds, 2.8 pounds over the flyweight non-title fight limit. The bout proceeded at catchweight and Avsaragova was fined 25% of her purse which went to Lara. Avsaragova won the close bout via split decision. 5 out of 7 media scores gave it to Lara.

Avsaragova faced Justine Kish on August 11, 2023, at Bellator 298. At weigh-ins, Avsaragova weighed in at 127.2 pounds, 1.2 pounds over the Flyweight non-title limit. Due to this, the bout proceeded at catchweight and she was fined 20 percent of her purse, which went to Kish. She lost the fight via unanimous decision.

=== Professional Fighters League ===
On February 18, 2025, the promotion officially revealed that Avsaragova joined the 2025 PFL Women's Flyweight Tournament.

In the quarterfinal, Avsaragova faced Elona Dana on April 11, 2025, at PFL 2. She lost the fight via neck crank in round one.

== Personal life ==
Diana has a younger sister and an older brother named Davud, the latter of whom also acts as her cornerman. She is currently learning how to speak English. In 2023, she married ARB combatant and former fighter Elbrus Maliev.

== Championships and achievements ==
- Freestyle wrestling
  - 2015 Russian cadet nationals 2015 – 3rd (60 kg)

== Mixed martial arts record ==
Professional record breakdown
8 matches	6 wins	2 losses
By knockout	1	0
By submission	1	1
By decision	4	1

Res.	Record	Opponent	Method	Event	Date	Round	Time	Location	Notes
Loss	6–2	Elora Dana	Submission (neck crank)	PFL 2 (2025)	April 11, 2025	1	4:48	Orlando, Florida, United States	2025 PFL Women's Flyweight Tournament Quarterfinal.
Loss	6–1	Justine Kish	Decision (unanimous)	Bellator 298	August 11, 2023	3	5:00	Sioux Falls, South Dakota, United States	Catchweight (127.2 lb) bout; Avsaragova missed weight.
Win	6–0	Alejandra Lara	Decision (split)	Bellator 290	February 4, 2023	3	5:00	Inglewood, California, United States	Catchweight (128.8 lb) bout; Avsaragova missed weight.
Win	5–0	Kyra Batara	Decision (unanimous)	Bellator 276	March 12, 2022	3	5:00	St. Louis, Missouri, United States	
Win	4–0	Gabriella Gulfin	Decision (split)	Bellator 262	July 16, 2021	3	5:00	Uncasville, Connecticut, United States	
Win	3–0	Tara Graff	KO (punches)	Bellator 256	April 9, 2021	1	0:29	Uncasville, Connecticut, United States	Flyweight debut.
Win	2–0	Ania Lurchenkova	Decision (unanimous)	Titan Global Championship	May 4, 2019	3	5:00	Tbilisi, Georgia	
Win	1–0	Alina Makarova	Submission (armbar)	Emir FC: Selection 1	December 29, 2017	1	1:57	Moscow, Russia	Bantamweight debut.

== See also ==
- List of current Bellator fighters
- List of female mixed martial artists
