= Munah Holland =

American mixed martial artist

- Born: November 2, 1974 (age 51); New Jersey, United States
- Nationality: American
- Height: 5 ft 4 in (1.63 m)
- Division: Flyweight
- Team: Tiger Schulmann's Mixed Martial Arts

Mixed martial arts record
- Total: 8
- Wins: 5
- By knockout: 3
- By decision: 2
- Losses: 3
- By knockout: 1
- By submission: 1
- By decision: 1

Other information
- Mixed martial arts record from Sherdog

Munah Holland is an American mixed martial artist who competes in the Flyweight division. She has fought in Invicta FC and Bellator.

== Mixed martial arts career ==
=== Bellator ===
Holland made her professional debut against Kim Couture at Ring of Combat 32 on October 23, 2010. She won the fight by unanimous decision.

Holland made her Bellator debut against Marianna Kheyfets at Bellator 63 on March 30, 2012. She won the fight by a second-round knockout.

Holland's next fight was outside of Bellator, as she faced Carina Damm at Matrix Fights 6 on July 10, 2012. She won the fight by a second-round knockout.

Holland returned to Bellator to face Michelle Ould at Bellator 74 on September 28, 2012. She lost the fight by unanimous decision.

=== Invicta FC ===
Holland made her promotional debut against Nina Ansaroff on December 7, 2013 at Invicta FC 7. Holland lost the fight via TKO in the third round.

== Mixed martial arts record ==
Professional record breakdown
8 matches	6 wins	2 losses
By knockout	3	1
By submission	2	1
By decision	1	0

Res.	Record	Opponent	Method	Event	Date	Round	Time	Location	Notes
Loss	5–3	Nina Ansaroff	KO (Punches)	Invicta FC 7	December 7, 2013	2	3:54	Kansas, United States	
Loss	5–2	Michelle Ould	Decision (Unanimous)	Bellator 74	September 28, 2012	3	5:00	New Jersey, United States	
Win	5–1	Carina Damm	KO (Punch)	MF - Matrix Fights 6	July 10, 2012	2	2:20	Philadelphia, United States	
Win	4–1	Marianna Kheyfets	KO (Punch)	Bellator 63	March 30, 2012	2	4:45	Connecticut, United States	
Win	3–1	Pearl Gonzalez	Decision (Majority)	ROC 39 - Ring of Combat 39	February 10, 2012	3	4:00	New Jersey, United States	
Win	2–1	Marissa Caldwell	TKO (Punches)	ROC 36 - Ring of Combat 36	June 17, 2011	2	1:00	New Jersey, United States	
Loss	1–1	Justine Kish	Submission (Triangle Choke)	ROC 33 - Ring of Combat 33	December 10, 2010	2	2:53	New Jersey, United States	
Win	1–0	Kim Couture	Decision (Unanimous)	ROC 32 - Ring of Combat 32	October 23, 2010	3	4:00	New Jersey, United States	
