= Macedonian People's League =

The Macedonian People's League (Macedonian: Македонскиот народен сојуз, romanized: Makedonskiot naroden sojuz; MPL) was a leftist organization, founded in the United States.

== History ==
The foundations of the MPL were set by Smile Vojdanov in Pontiac, Michigan, in 1929. Other founders include Georgi Pirinski and Dincho Ralley. The organization was created under Soviet and Yugoslav communist orders. In 1930, the first conference of the League was held in Toledo, Ohio, with Smile Vojdanov being elected as a chairman of the Central Committee and Georgi Pirinski Sr. as a secretary. The first regular congress of MPL was held in Gary, Indiana, in 1931, and since then the Macedonian People's League has been formed. Immediately after its formation, the MPL was associated with various left-wing organizations in the United States and Europe, as well as with the Comintern.

It established relations with the Comintern's leader Georgi Dimitrov. Dimitrov praised the work of Georgi Pirinski publicized in Daily Worker in August 1935. Pirinski appealed to Bulgarian Americans to heed the call for action by their countryman Dimitrov. In 1938, the MPL was renamed the Macedonian-American People's League, and a branch, the Macedonian-Canadian People's League, was founded in Canada. The League published in the Bulgarian language the newspaper "People's Will" (Narodna Volya) in Detroit. The newspaper attacked both the IMRO and MPO, referring to them as "terrorists" and "Bulgarian nationalists and fascists".

The organization supported the creation of an independent Macedonia within a Balkan Federation. It was the first organization in the United States to support the idea that the Macedonians constitute a separate nationality and that their language is distinct. MPL acted aggressively against the Macedonian Patriotic Organization, that it believed, was a Bulgarian agent. In the 1940s MPL supported the creation of the People's Republic of Macedonia within Communist Yugoslavia and favored the establishment of Communist regimes throughout Eastern Europe. During the Tito-Stalin split, the organization's leadership decided not to support the Yugoslav leadership and openly worked against the People's Republic of Macedonia. Afterwards, its membership declined and the organization was shut down in 1956.

== See also ==
- Macedonian-Australian People's League
- Macedonian nationalism
- Macedonian Americans
