= Smile Vojdanov =

Smile Vojdanov Смиле Војданов
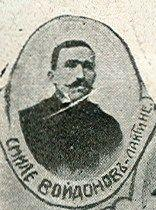
- Portrait of Smile Vojdanov
- Born: February 1, 1872; Laktinje, Ottoman Empire (present-day North Macedonia)
- Died: March 4, 1958 (aged 86); Pontiac, Michigan, United States

Smile Vojdanov or Smeale Voydanoff (Macedonian: Смиле Војданов, originally spelled in older Bulgarian orthography: Смиле Войдановъ; February 1, 1872 – March 4, 1958) was a Bulgarian and Macedonian revolutionary, member and voivode of the Internal Macedonian Revolutionary Organization, and longtime activist in the Macedonian People's League in emigration.

== Biography ==
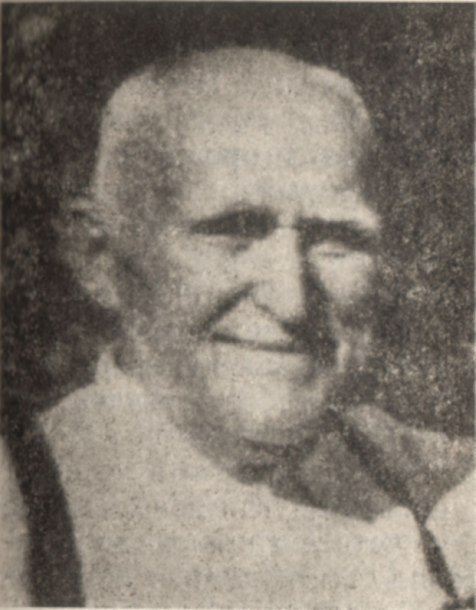
Smile Vojdanov in Pontiac, Michigan, circa 1920.

Vojdanov was born in Laktinje, a village near the city of Kičevo. He studied in Ohrid, as well as at the Kičevo Monastery where he remained until 1890. In 1892, he worked as a teacher in his native village, and later from 1894 to 1897 as a pa-drone in Slivovo. The following year Hristo Uzunov and Metodi Patchev introduced Smile Vojdanov into the VMRO.

In 1901, Vojdanov began forming committees of the organization. During the Ilinden Uprising, Vojdanov and his group were active in the area of Gorna Debarca. After the uprising was suppressed, Vojdanov headed to Bulgaria. In March 1905 he entered Macedonia with his group and Aleksandar Protogerov. During the Balkan Wars, he served with the Macedonian-Adrianopolitan Volunteer Corps of volunteers in Bulgarian army. After the war, Petar Chaulev and Vojdanov, together with 189 rebels, returned to their revolutionary activities in Ohrid (now against the new Serbian government).

After World War I, Vojdanov immigrated to America and settled in Pontiac, Michigan, where he started a small business. He joined the management committee of the newspaper Narodna Volja (People's Will). In 1931, he became chairman of the Central Committee of the Macedonian People's League. According to FBI report, Vojdanov was chosen as chairman "because he was a rather wellto-do elderly man who had an intense interest in gaining the ultimate freedom of Macedonia and the Balkan states", having previously led a guerilla band during "the Balkan war for independence from Greece" and had no greater desire than to see a free Macedonia. In 1933, the United States created a special "Committee to Protect Macedonian rights and freedoms", chaired by the writer Stoyan Christowe. The committee sent a special delegation that consisted of Vojdanov, Edward Haskell and Bishop D. Smith, who visited Athens, Belgrade, and Sofia. They condemned and protested against the oppressive policies targeting Macedonians and the leftists by the regimes in Bulgaria, Yugoslavia, and Greece, which they described as "fascist". In an interview with Angel Dinev in newspaper Makedonski Vesti, Vojdanov emphasized the importance of unity among the Macedonian diaspora, stating that only through reconciliation and the creation of a single national front could Macedonians effectively seek international support. He noted that while some confusion existed among public figures, most activists favored reconciliation, and he believed in the eventual unification of Macedonians around a "pure Macedonian idea".

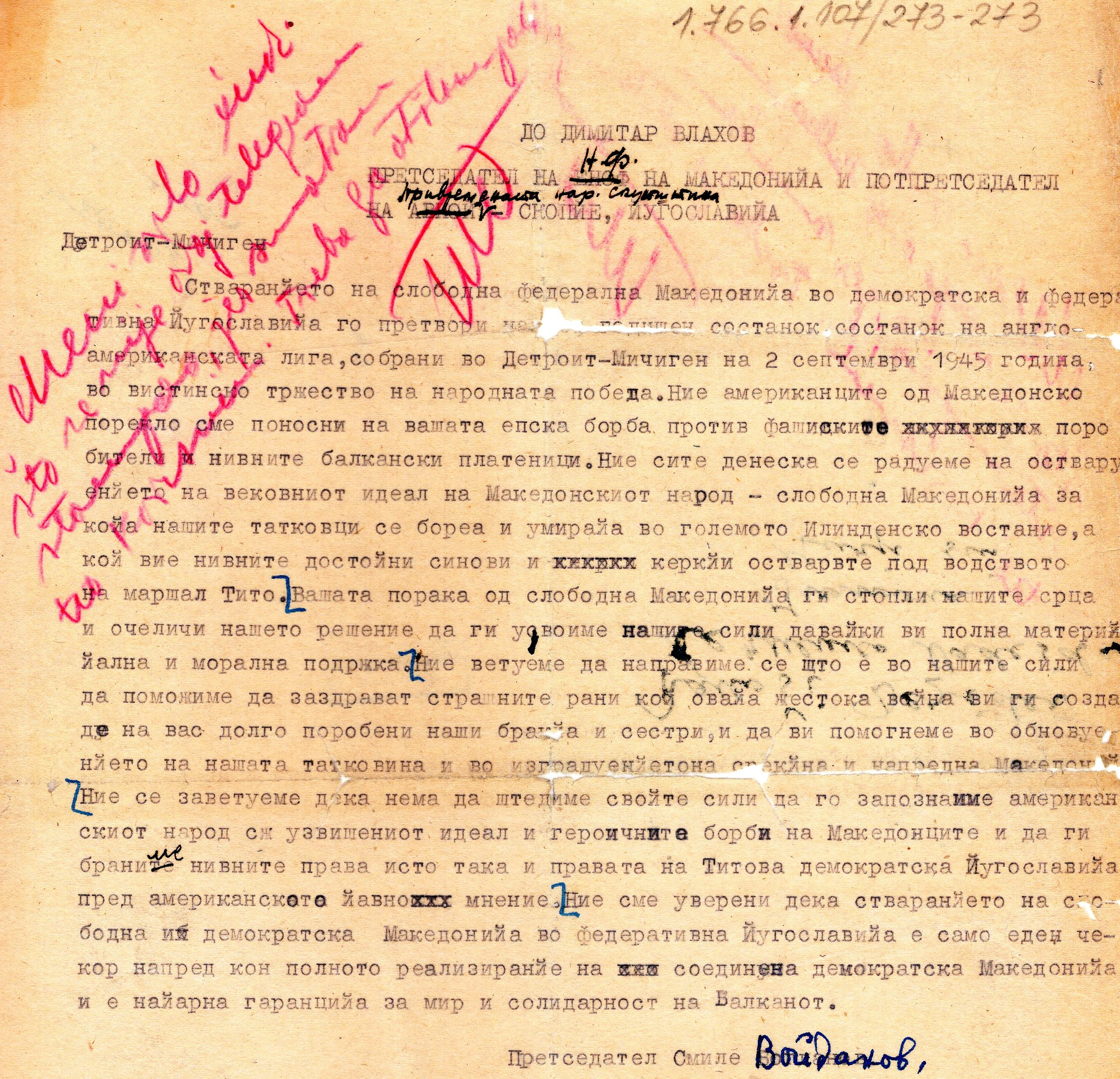
The telegram sent by Smile Vojdanov to Dimitar Vlahov in September 1945, expressing the Macedonian diaspora’s support in Detroit for the creation of a federal Macedonia within Yugoslavia, describing it as the fulfillment of a “centuries-long ideal” rooted in the Ilinden Uprising of 1903. The document was proofread and initialed by Josip Broz Tito.

After the outbreak of World War II he joined the American Slavic Congress, a left-leaning, anti-fascist organization formed in 1942 to unite Slavic Americans in support of the Allied war effort, heavily promoting cooperation with the Soviet Union. In February 1945 Vojdanov authored a memorandum addressed to the American State Department and President Franklin D. Roosevelt arguing that ignoring the Macedonian people’s struggle for self-determination and subjecting them to denationalization policies by the neighboring states led to division, oppression, and instability in the Balkans. The memorandum called for unifying all parts of Macedonia into a free federal state within broader South-Slavic state as a solution to secure peace in the region.

In 1948, he was elected as one of the Macedonian Nationality Officers within the association. At the same period, he accepted invitation to go to SR Macedonia. During his stay, Vojdanov participated in numerous public events and praised the Yugoslav and Macedonian socialist regimes. Upon returning to the United States, after the Tito-Stalin split, he reversed his stance, sided with the Cominform, and accused the Yugoslav regime of "betrayal of the struggle against imperialism and working against the spirit of internationalism and destroying the unity of the revolutionary parties".

Smile Vojdanov died in Pontiac, Michigan on March 4, 1958. The 150th anniversary of his birth was commemorated by Macedonian Americans at his burial site in Pontiac in 2022.
