= PFL 2 (2025) =

Professional Fighters League MMA event in 2025

- The poster for PFL 2
- Promotion: Professional Fighters League
- Date: April 11, 2025
- Venue: Universal Studios Florida
- City: Orlando, Florida, United States

Event chronology
PFL 1	PFL 2	PFL 3

The PFL 2 mixed martial arts event for the 2025 season of the Professional Fighters League was held on April 11, 2025, at the Universal Studios Florida in Orlando, Florida, United States. This event marked the quarterfinal of the single-elimination tournament format in the Women's Flyweight and Bantamweight divisions.

== Background ==
The event featured the quarterfinal of 2025 PFL World Tournament in a women's flyweight and bantamweight divisions.

Ciarán Clarke withdrew of the bantamweight quarterfinal against Kasum Kasumov for unknown reasons and was replaced by Justin Wetzell.

The bantamweight quarterfinal between 2024 PFL MENA bantamweight winner Ali Taleb and Zebenzui Ruiz was removed from the event for visa issues and Taleb was moved to an event on May 24 against Taylor Lapilus. The alternate bout between Francesco Nuzzi and Mando Gutierrez was promoted to quarterfinal instead, Nuzzi who scheduled to face Matheus Mattos and was replaced by Vilson Ndregjoni.

A week later, it was announced that Magomed Magomedov withdrew of his bout against former LFA Bantamweight Champion Leandro Higo in a bantamweight quarterfinal and was replaced by The Ultimate Fighter 29 alumni Josh Rettinghouse. In turn, Rettinghouse was not medically cleared and was replaced by Marcirley Alves.

On the fight week, Taila Santos withdrew from the tournament against former Bellator Women's Flyweight World Champion Juliana Velasquez and was replaced by Ekaterina Shakalova.

At weigh-ins, Justin Wetzell weighed in at 138.4 pounds, 2.4 pounds over the bantamweight limit, resulting in him being fined a percentage of his purse.

== Results ==
Main card (ESPN2 / ESPN+)
Weight class				Method	Round	Time	Notes
Bantamweight	Marcirley Alves	def.	Leandro Higo	Decision (split) (28–29, 29–28, 29–28)	3	5:00	(Note: 2025 PFL Bantamweight Tournament Quarterfinal.)
Women's Flyweight	Liz Carmouche	def.	Ilara Joanne	TKO (punches)	1	1:25	(Note: 2025 PFL Women's Flyweight Tournament Quarterfinal.)
Bantamweight	Mando Gutierrez	def.	Francesco Nuzzi	Submission (rear-naked choke)	1	4:13	(Note: 2025 PFL Bantamweight Tournament Quarterfinal.)
Bantamweight	Justin Wetzell	def.	Kasum Kasumov	Decision (unanimous) (29–28, 30–27, 30–27)	3	5:00	(Note: 2025 PFL Bantamweight Tournament Quarterfinal. Wetzell missed weight (138.4 lbs))
Preliminary card (ESPN+)
Women's Flyweight	Ekaterina Shakalova	def.	Juliana Velasquez	Submission (rear-naked choke)	1	2:05	(Note: 2025 PFL Women's Flyweight Tournament Quarterfinal.)
Bantamweight	Jake Hadley	def.	Matheus Mattos	Submission (twister)	3	2:16	(Note: 2025 PFL Bantamweight Tournament Quarterfinal.)
Women's Flyweight	Jena Bishop	def.	Kana Watanabe	Decision (unanimous) (30–27, 30–27, 29–28)	3	5:00	(Note: 2025 PFL Women's Flyweight Tournament Quarterfinal.)
Women's Flyweight	Elora Dana	def.	Diana Avsaragova	Submission (neck crank)	1	4:48	(Note: 2025 PFL Women's Flyweight Tournament Quarterfinal.)

== Tournament brackets ==
=== 2025 PFL Bantamweight Tournament ===
Quarter-finals
(Brazil) Leandro Higo	3
(Brazil) Marcirley Alves (Note: Magomed Magomedov withdrew from the tournament due to injury and was replaced by Josh Rettinghouse. Rettinghouse was not medically cleared and replaced by Marcirley Alves)	SD
(England) Jake Hadley	SUB
(Brazil) Matheus Mattos (Note: Sarvarjon Khamidov withdrew from the tournament due to visa issues and was replaced by Matheus Mattos.)	2
(Russia) Kasum Kasumov	3
(United States) Justin Wetzell (Note: Ciaran Clarke withdrew from the tournament due to injury and was replaced by Justin Wetzell.)	UD
(Italy) Francesco Nuzzi	1
(Mexico) Mando Gutierrez (Note: Ali Taleb and Zebenzui Ruiz withdrew from the tournament due to visa issues and were replaced by Francesco Nuzzi and Mando Gutierrez.)	SUB

Semi-finals
(Brazil) Marcirley Alves
(England) Jake Hadley
(United States) Justin Wetzell
(Mexico) Mando Gutierrez

Final

=== 2025 PFL Women's Flyweight Tournament ===
Quarter-finals
(Brazil) Juliana Velasquez	1
(Ukraine) Ekaterina Shakalova (Note: Taila Santos withdrew from the tournament and was replaced by Ekaterina Shakalova.)	SUB
(Japan) Kana Watanabe	3
(United States) Jena Bishop	UD
(United States) Liz Carmouche	TKO
(Brazil) Ilara Joanne	1
(Brazil) Elora Dana	SUB
(Russia) Diana Avsaragova	1

Semi-finals
(Ukraine) Ekaterina Shakalova
(United States) Jena Bishop
(United States) Liz Carmouche
(Brazil) Elora Dana

Final

== See also ==
- 2025 in Professional Fighters League
- List of PFL events
- List of current PFL fighters
