= Christine Stanley =

MMA fighter

- Born: October 1, 1980 (age 46); Taipei, Taiwan
- Other names: Knuckles
- Nationality: American
- Height: 5 ft 5 in (1.65 m)
- Weight: 125 lb (57 kg; 8.9 st)
- Division: Flyweight
- Reach: 64.0 in (163 cm)
- Style: Taekwondo
- Fighting out of: San Diego, CA
- Team: Alliance MMA
- Rank: Black belt in Taekwondo Blue belt in Jiu-Jitsu
- Years active: 2012 - present

Mixed martial arts record
- Total: 9
- Wins: 5
- By knockout: 4
- By decision: 1
- Losses: 3
- By submission: 1
- By decision: 2
- Draws: 1

Other information
- Website: Christine Stanley
- Mixed martial arts record from Sherdog

Christine Stanley is a Taiwanese American mixed martial artist who competes in the Flyweight division in Invicta.

== Mixed martial arts career ==
Stanley made her professional debut against Leah Barfield at NFC 12 on April 13, 2012. She won the fight by a first-round knockout. Stanley amassed a 3–1 record before signing with Invicta FC, with all fights ending in a stoppage.

Stanley made her Invicta debut against Laura Salazar at Invicta FC 11: Cyborg vs. Tweet on February 27, 2015. She won the fight by a first-round technical knockout.

Stanley faced Shannon Sinn at Invicta FC 17: Evinger vs. Schneider on May 7, 2016. She won the fight by unanimous decision.

Stanley faced Agnieszka Niedźwiedź at Invicta FC 18: Grasso vs. Esquibel on July 29, 2016. She lost the fight by unanimous decision.

Stanley faced Kelly Kobold-Schmitz at LFA 20 on August 25, 2017. The fight was ruled a split decision draw.

== Mixed martial arts record ==
Professional record breakdown
9 matches	5 wins	3 losses
By knockout	4	0
By submission	0	1
By decision	1	2
Draws	1	
No contests	0	

Res.	Record	Opponent	Method	Event	Date	Round	Time	Location	Notes
Draw	5–3–1	Kelly Kobold-Schmitz	Draw (split)	LFA 20	August 25, 2017	3	5:00	Prior Lake, Minnesota	
Loss	5–3	Liz Tracy	Decision (split)	SFL 51: America	October 22, 2016	3	5:00	Tacoma, Washington	
Loss	5–2	Agnieszka Niedźwiedź	Decision (unanimous)	Invicta FC 18: Grasso vs. Esquibel	July 29, 2016	3	5:00	Kansas City, Missouri	
Win	5–1	Shannon Sinn	Decision (unanimous)	Invicta FC 17: Evinger vs. Schneider	May 7, 2016	3	5:00	Costa Mesa, California	
Win	4–1	Laura Salazar	TKO (punches)	Invicta FC 11: Cyborg vs. Tweet	February 27, 2015	1	2:59	Los Angeles, California	
Win	3–1	Katie Anita Runyan	KO (flying spinning hook kick)	XFS Tidal Wave	August 23, 2014	1	0:05	Valley Center, California	
Win	2–1	Jackie Bollinger	TKO (punches)	XFS Feast or Famine	November 16, 2013	1	0:58	Valley Center, California	
Loss	1–1	Justine Kish	Submission (armbar)	RFA 9: Munhoz vs. Curran	August 16, 2013	2	4:29	Los Angeles, California	
Win	1–0	Leah Barfield	TKO (punches)	Native Fighting Championships 12	April 13, 2012	1	0:29	Campo, California	
