= Justine Kish =

American mixed martial artist

- Born: Svetlana Nasibulina; 13 April 1988 (age 38); Leningrad, Russian SFSR, Soviet Union
- Nationality: American
- Height: 5 ft 5 in (165 cm)
- Weight: 115 lb (52 kg; 8 st 3 lb)
- Division: Flyweight; Strawweight
- Reach: 64.0 in (163 cm)
- Stance: Southpaw
- Fighting out of: Los Angeles, California
- Team: Black House MMA (before 2017, 2018–present); Gym-O (2017–2018)
- Rank: Muay Thai World Champion; Black belt in Kenpo
- Years active: 2010–present

Professional boxing record
- Total: 2
- Wins: 2
- Losses: 0

Kickboxing record
- Total: 24
- Wins: 22
- Losses: 2

Mixed martial arts record
- Total: 16
- Wins: 9
- By submission: 2
- By decision: 7
- Losses: 7
- By knockout: 1
- By submission: 1
- By decision: 5

Other information
- Mixed martial arts record from Sherdog

Svetlana Nasibulina (born 13 April 1988), known professionally by her ring name Justine Kish, is an American mixed martial artist that competes in the Flyweight division. A professional since 2010, she has also competed in the Ultimate Fighting Championship (UFC) and for Bellator MMA

== Early life ==
Justine Kish was born in Leningrad, Soviet Union in modern-day Russia and was adopted by an American couple. She discovered Muay Thai as a teenager, while taking up fitness, which eventually led her to competitions.

== Muay Thai career ==
Kish competed in Muay Thai for 10 years, winning 18 matches and a World Muaythai Council championship belt in the process.

== Mixed martial arts career ==
=== Early career ===
Kish began her professional MMA career in 2010. She amassed an undefeated record of five wins and no losses, including a win over future The Ultimate Fighter housemate Randa Markos.

=== The Ultimate Fighter ===
In September 2013, it was announced that Kish was one of the fighters selected by the UFC to appear on The Ultimate Fighter: A Champion Will Be Crowned.

Kish was the seventh pick by coach Anthony Pettis. She was expected to face Bec Rawlings in the preliminary round, but was forced out of the tournament due to a knee injury. This injury also prevented her from appearing on the finale of the show, but Kish made her debut with the promotion in 2015.

=== Ultimate Fighting Championship ===
Kish made her official UFC debut against Nina Ansaroff on January 2, 2016, at UFC 195. She won the fight by unanimous decision.

Kish next faced Ashley Yoder on December 9, 2016, at UFC Fight Night: Lewis vs. Abdurakhimov in a catchweight bout as Kish missed weight. She won the fight by unanimous decision.

Kish faced Felice Herrig on June 25, 2017 at UFC Fight Night: Chiesa vs. Lee. She lost the bout via unanimous decision. Kish received media attention after losing control of her bowels during the fight and issuing a humorous response later.

Kish faced Ji Yeon Kim on January 27, 2018, at UFC on Fox: Jacaré vs. Brunson 2. She lost the fight via split decision. 11 out of 14 media scores gave it to Kish.

Kish returned after a two year hiatus and faced Lucie Pudilová on January 25, 2020, at UFC Fight Night 166. She won the fight via unanimous decision.

Kish faced Sabina Mazo on September 12, 2020, at UFC Fight Night 177. She lost the fight via a rear-naked choke submission in round three.

Kish faced Tracy Cortez on April 17, 2021, at UFC on ESPN 22. At the weigh-ins, Cortez weighed in at 126.5 pounds, a half pound over the flyweight non-title fight limit. Her bout proceeded at a catchweight and she was fined 20% of her individual purse, which went to Kish. Kish lost the close fight via a split decision.

On April 30, it was revealed that Kish was no longer with the UFC.

=== Bellator MMA ===
On January 6, 2022, it was announced that Kish had signed a multi-bout contract with Bellator MMA.

Kish faced DeAnna Bennett on February 19, 2022 at Bellator 274. She lost the bout via unanimous decision.

Kish faced Ilima-Lei Macfarlane on April 23, 2022 at Bellator 279. In an upset, she won the bout via unanimous decision.

Kish rematched DeAnna Bennett on August 12, 2022 at Bellator 284. At weigh ins, Kish came in at 128.4 lbs, 2.4 pounds over the weight limit, for the flyweight bout, resulting in her being a fined a percentage of her purse which went to Bennett and the bout proceeded at catchweight. Kish lost the bout again via unanimous decision.

Kish faced Diana Avsaragova on August 11, 2023, at Bellator 298. At weigh-ins, Avsaragova weighed in at 127.2 pounds, 1.2 pounds over the Flyweight non-title limit. Due to this, the bout proceeded at catchweight and she was fined 20 percent of his purse, which went to Kish. She won the fight via unanimous decision.

== Championships and accomplishments ==
=== Kickboxing ===
- World Muaythai Council
  - WMC/EMF European Champion (one time)

== Kickboxing record ==
Kickboxing record
18 wins (9 KOs), 2 losses, 0 draws
Date	Result	Opponent	Event	Location	Method	Round	Time	Record
2012-02-27	Win	(Germany) Farida Okiko	Bangla Boxing Stadium	Phuket, Thailand	Unanimous Decision	3		
Fought for the WMC World Middleweightweight (−58.8 kg/125 lb) Full Contact Championship.
Legend: Win Loss Draw/No contest Notes

== Mixed martial arts record ==
Professional record breakdown
16 matches	9 wins	7 losses
By knockout	0	1
By submission	2	1
By decision	7	5

Res.	Record	Opponent	Method	Event	Date	Round	Time	Location	Notes
Loss	9–7	Sani Brännfors	TKO (punches and elbows)	Ice Cage Fighting 7	May 16, 2026	1	4:46	Tampere, Finland	Bantamweight debut.
Win	9–6	Diana Avsaragova	Decision (unanimous)	Bellator 298	August 11, 2023	3	5:00	Sioux Falls, South Dakota, United States	Catchweight (127.2 lb) bout; Avsaragova missed weight.
Loss	8–6	DeAnna Bennett	Decision (unanimous)	Bellator 284	August 12, 2022	3	5:00	Sioux Falls, South Dakota, United States	Catchweight (128.4 lb) bout; Kish missed weight.
Win	8–5	Ilima-Lei Macfarlane	Decision (unanimous)	Bellator 279	April 23, 2022	3	5:00	Honolulu, Hawaii, United States	
Loss	7–5	DeAnna Bennett	Decision (unanimous)	Bellator 274	February 19, 2022	3	5:00	Uncasville, Connecticut, United States	
Loss	7–4	Tracy Cortez	Decision (split)	UFC on ESPN: Whittaker vs. Gastelum	April 17, 2021	3	5:00	Las Vegas, Nevada, United States	Catchweight (126.5 lb) bout; Cortez missed weight.
Loss	7–3	Sabina Mazo	Submission (rear-naked choke)	UFC Fight Night: Waterson vs. Hill	September 12, 2020	3	3:57	Las Vegas, Nevada, United States	
Win	7–2	Lucie Pudilová	Decision (unanimous)	UFC Fight Night: Blaydes vs. dos Santos	January 25, 2020	3	5:00	Raleigh, North Carolina, United States	
Loss	6–2	Ji Yeon Kim	Decision (split)	UFC on Fox: Jacaré vs. Brunson 2	January 27, 2018	3	5:00	Charlotte, North Carolina, United States	Return to Flyweight.
Loss	6–1	Felice Herrig	Decision (unanimous)	UFC Fight Night: Chiesa vs. Lee	June 25, 2017	3	5:00	Oklahoma City, Oklahoma, United States	
Win	6–0	Ashley Yoder	Decision (unanimous)	UFC Fight Night: Lewis vs. Abdurakhimov	December 9, 2016	3	5:00	Albany, New York, United States	Catchweight (116.4 lb) bout; Kish missed weight.
Win	5–0	Nina Ansaroff	Decision (unanimous)	UFC 195	January 2, 2016	3	5:00	Las Vegas, Nevada, United States	
Win	4–0	Randa Markos	Decision (unanimous)	RFA 12	January 24, 2014	3	5:00	Los Angeles, California, United States	Strawweight debut.
Win	3–0	Jin Tang	Decision (unanimous)	Fusion Fighting Championship 5	December 18, 2013	3	5:00	Las Vegas, Nevada, United States	
Win	2–0	Christine Stanley	Submission (armbar)	RFA 9	August 16, 2013	2	3:00	Los Angeles, California, United States	Flyweight debut.
Win	1–0	Munah Holland	Submission (triangle choke)	Ring of Combat 33	December 3, 2010	2	2:53	Atlantic City, New Jersey, United States	Catchweight (130 lb) bout.
