= Katrina Markoff =

American chocolatier (born 1973)

Katrina Markoff (born 1973) is an American entrepreneur and chocolatier. She is the founder and CEO of Violet Flame Chocolate, a gourmet chocolate company based in Chicago and founder of Vosges Chocolat. She was chosen as the Women Entrepreneur of the Year in 2007 by Open American Express & Entrepreneur Magazine. She is the recipient of Fortune Magazine's 40 under 40, the Bon Appétit Food Artisan of the Year Award, and was named "the innovator in chocolate to lead the US through the next 30 years" by Food & Wine Magazine.

== Early life ==
She was born in 1973 in Fort Wayne Indiana. The middle child of Michelle Rousseff and John Markoff. Her father was Macedonian while her mother was of half Polish and half Macedonian descent. She has an older brother Jonathan and a younger sister Natalie. Before discovering her calling as a chocolatier, Markoff graduated from Vanderbilt University majoring in chemistry and psychology, then moved to Paris to attend culinary school at Le Cordon Bleu.

== Business career ==
Markoff launched her gourmet chocolate company Vosges Haut-Chocolat in 1998.

== Personal life ==
Markoff lives in Chicago with her husband Jason and their two children.
