= Nina Nunes =

American mixed martial arts fighter

- Born: Nina Ansaroff; December 3, 1985 (age 40); Weston, Florida, U.S.
- Height: 5 ft 5 in (1.65 m)
- Weight: 126 lb (57 kg; 9.0 st)
- Division: Strawweight (2014–2021); Flyweight (2013, 2022)
- Reach: 64 in (163 cm)
- Fighting out of: Fort Lauderdale, Florida, U.S.
- Team: American Top Team (2008–2012, 2014–present); MMA Masters (2012–2014)
- Rank: 3rd degree black belt in Taekwondo; Purple belt in Brazilian Jiu-Jitsu
- Years active: 2008–2022

Mixed martial arts record
- Total: 18
- Wins: 11
- By knockout: 4
- By submission: 2
- By decision: 5
- Losses: 7
- By submission: 2
- By decision: 5

Other information
- Spouse: Amanda Nunes
- Children: 2
- Mixed martial arts record from Sherdog

Nina Nunes (née Ansaroff; born December 3, 1985) is an American former mixed martial artist who last competed in the women's flyweight division of the Ultimate Fighting Championship.

== Background ==
Nunes was born and raised in Weston, Florida. Her maternal grandparents descend from Macedonia. Nunes started practicing Taekwondo at the age of six. She wrestled while at Lake Region High School. She began training in mixed martial arts in 2009 as a way to lose weight and to help keep in shape following a motorcycle accident.

== Mixed martial arts career ==
Nunes made her professional debut in 2010 competing in regional promotions, and amassed a record of 5–3 before joining Invicta FC.

=== Invicta FC ===
Nunes made her promotional debut against Munah Holland on December 7, 2013, at Invicta FC 7. Nunes won the fight via TKO in the third round and earned the Knockout of the Night bonus award.

=== Ultimate Fighting Championship ===
Nunes made her debut in the Ultimate Fighting Championship (UFC) against Juliana Lima on November 8, 2014, at UFC Fight Night 56. Nunes lost the fight via unanimous decision.

Nunes was expected to face Rose Namajunas on May 23, 2015, at UFC 187. Nunes missed weight on her first attempt at the weigh-ins, coming in 4 lbs overweight at 120 lbs. After having made no attempts to cut further, she was fined 20 percent of her fight purse, which went to Namajunas. However, on the day of the event, Nunes was pulled out of the bout by UFC doctors after contracting a case of the flu. As a result, Namajunas was pulled from the event entirely.

Nunes next faced Justine Kish at UFC 195 on January 2, 2016. She lost the fight by unanimous decision.

Nunes faced Jocelyn Jones-Lybarger at UFC Fight Night: Rodríguez vs. Penn on January 15, 2017. She won the fight via submission in the third round.

Nunes faced Angela Hill at UFC Fight Night: Poirier vs. Pettis on November 11, 2017. She won the fight via unanimous decision.

Nunes faced Randa Markos on July 28, 2018, at UFC on Fox: Alvarez vs. Poirier 2. She won the fight by unanimous decision.

Nunes faced Cláudia Gadelha on December 8, 2018, at UFC 231. She won the fight via unanimous decision.

Nunes faced Tatiana Suarez on June 8, 2019, at UFC 238. She lost the fight via unanimous decision.

On October 10, 2019, Nunes announced that she would put her mixed martial arts career on hold in order to attempt to have her first child. The attempts were successful as in March 2020, her wife Amanda Nunes announced that the couple is expecting their first child, to be born later that year. Nina Nunes gave birth to a daughter in September 2020.

Nunes faced Mackenzie Dern on April 10, 2021, at UFC on ABC 2. She lost the bout via first round armbar.

Nunes was scheduled to face Amanda Lemos on December 18, 2021, at UFC Fight Night 199. However, Nunes was removed from the bout for undisclosed reason and she was replaced by Angela Hill.

==== Move up to flyweight division ====
Nunes was scheduled to face Cynthia Calvillo in a flyweight bout on July 9, 2022, at UFC on ESPN 39. However, the day of the event, Nunes withdrew due to illness and the bout was initially cancelled, but eventually rescheduled for UFC on ESPN 41 on August 13, 2022. Nunes won the fight via split decision, and she announced her retirement after the fight.

== Personal life ==
Nunes is married to UFC fighter Amanda Nunes, the former UFC Women's Bantamweight and Featherweight champion. The couple welcomed a daughter on September 24, 2020. In April 2021 she began using the last name Nunes within the UFC. Her April 10 fight against Mackenzie Dern was her first fight under her new last name.

== Championships and accomplishments ==
- Ultimate Fighting Championship
  - UFC.com Awards
    - 2018: Ranked #9 Upset of the Year vs. Claudia Gadelha
- Invicta Fighting Championships
  - Knockout of the Night (One time) vs. Munah Holland

== Mixed martial arts record ==
Professional record breakdown
18 matches	11 wins	7 losses
By knockout	4	0
By submission	2	2
By decision	5	5

Res.	Record	Opponent	Method	Event	Date	Round	Time	Location	Notes
Win	11–7	Cynthia Calvillo	Decision (split)	UFC on ESPN: Vera vs. Cruz	August 13, 2022	3	3:00	San Diego, California, United States	Return to Flyweight.
Loss	10–7	Mackenzie Dern	Submission (armbar)	UFC on ABC: Vettori vs. Holland	April 10, 2021	1	4:48	Las Vegas, Nevada, United States	
Loss	10–6	Tatiana Suarez	Decision (unanimous)	UFC 238	June 8, 2019	3	5:00	Chicago, Illinois, United States	
Win	10–5	Cláudia Gadelha	Decision (unanimous)	UFC 231	December 8, 2018	3	5:00	Toronto, Canada	
Win	9–5	Randa Markos	Decision (unanimous)	UFC on Fox: Alvarez vs. Poirier 2	July 28, 2018	3	5:00	Calgary, Alberta, Canada	
Win	8–5	Angela Hill	Decision (unanimous)	UFC Fight Night: Poirier vs. Pettis	November 11, 2017	3	5:00	Norfolk, Virginia, United States	
Win	7–5	Jocelyn Jones-Lybarger	Submission (rear-naked choke)	UFC Fight Night: Rodríguez vs. Penn	January 15, 2017	3	3:39	Phoenix, Arizona, United States	
Loss	6–5	Justine Kish	Decision (unanimous)	UFC 195	January 2, 2016	3	5:00	Las Vegas, Nevada, United States	
Loss	6–4	Juliana Lima	Decision (unanimous)	UFC Fight Night: Shogun vs. Saint Preux	November 8, 2014	3	5:00	Uberlândia, Brazil	Strawweight debut.
Win	6–3	Munah Holland	TKO (punches)	Invicta FC 7: Honchak vs. Smith	December 7, 2013	3	3:54	Kansas City, Missouri, United States	Flyweight bout. Knockout of the Night.
Win	5–3	Aylla Caroline Lima	TKO (body kick and punches)	Premier Fight League 10	June 15, 2013	1	1:25	Serrinha, Brazil	
Win	4–3	Trisha Clark	TKO (punches)	Centurion Fights	March 1, 2013	2	2:14	St. Joseph, Missouri, United States	
Win	3–3	Tyra Parker	Submission (armbar)	Wild Bill's Fight Night 51	December 15, 2012	2	2:00	Duluth, Georgia, United States	
Win	2–3	Jessica Doerner	TKO (punches)	The Cage Inc.: Battle at the Border 11	November 24, 2012	1	1:52	Hankinson, North Dakota, United States	
Loss	1–3	Casey Noland	Submission (rear-naked choke)	The Cage Inc.: Battle at the Border 10	July 30, 2011	1	1:18	Hankinson, North Dakota, United States	
Loss	1–2	Barb Honchak	Decision (unanimous)	Crowbar MMA: Spring Brawl 2	April 29, 2011	3	5:00	Grand Forks, North Dakota, United States	
Loss	1–1	Carla Esparza	Decision (split)	Crowbar MMA: Winter Brawl	December 10, 2010	3	5:00	Grand Forks, North Dakota, United States	
Win	1–0	Catia Vitoria	Decision (unanimous)	Crowbar MMA: Fall Brawl	September 11, 2010	5	5:00	Fargo, North Dakota, United States	

Amateur record breakdown		
3 matches	3 wins	0 losses
By knockout	2	0
By decision	1	0

Res.	Record	Opponent	Method	Event	Date	Round	Time	Location	Notes
Win	3–0	Jenny Yum	Decision (unanimous)	HOOKnSHOOT – GFight Summit 2010	March 20, 2010	3	3:00	Evansville, Indiana, United States	
Win	2–0	Christy Tada	TKO (referee stoppage)	The Future Stars of MMA	April 24, 2009	1	0:46		
Win	1–0	Sara Seitz	TKO (submission to punches)	Xplosive Caged Combat	January 11, 2008	3	1:30		

== See also ==
- List of female mixed martial artists
