= Agnieszka Niedźwiedź =

Polish mixed martial arts fighter

- Born: February 27, 1995 (age 31); Katowice, Poland
- Other names: Kuma
- Nationality: Polish
- Height: 5 ft 5 in (1.65 m)
- Weight: 125 lb (57 kg; 8.9 st)
- Division: Flyweight
- Reach: 64.0 in (163 cm)
- Style: Judo
- Team: Grappling Kraków
- Rank: Black belt in Judo
- Years active: 2012 - 2017

Mixed martial arts record
- Total: 11
- Wins: 10
- By knockout: 5
- By submission: 2
- By decision: 3
- Losses: 1
- By decision: 1

Other information
- Mixed martial arts record from Sherdog

Agnieszka Niedźwiedź (Polish: [aɡˈɲɛʂka ˈɲɛd͡ʑvjɛt͡ɕ]; born 27 February 1995) is a Polish former mixed martial artist who last competed in the Flyweight division in Invicta FC. She fought for organizations like MMA Attack, Cage Warriors and Fighters Arena. In 2017, the year of her last recorded fight to date, she was ranked #2 in the world in the women's flyweight category.

== Early life ==
Niedźwiedź was sent to a Judo class by her mother at the age of seven. She continued to train for ten years, acquiring competition experience, until her brother convinced her to try Brazilian Jiu-Jitsu. After only two or three classes, Niedźwiedź was offered an MMA fight. Her next fight a month later would start her MMA career.

== Mixed martial arts career ==
=== Early career ===
Niedźwiedź began her professional MMA career in October 2012 in her native Poland. Over the next year and a half, she amassed a record of seven wins against no losses before joining Invicta FC.

=== Invicta FC ===
Niedźwiedź made her American debut at Invicta FC 18: Grasso vs. Esquibel against Christine Stanley and won via unanimous decision. She then fought Vanessa Porto at Invicta FC 23: Porto vs. Niedźwiedź and again won by unanimous decision.

On December 8, 2017, she faced Jennifer Maia for the Invicta FC flyweight title. She lost the fight via unanimous decision.

Niedźwiedź was offered a place on The Ultimate Fighter (TUF), but declined, citing her appreciation of the high skill level in Invicta FC and her reluctance to be apart from her young son.

== Personal life ==
Niedźwiedź was born in Katowice, Poland. She describes her main motivation as being her son, Alan. When asked what she would be doing if she was not doing MMA, she said: "My dream is to have my own baker’s shop as I love to bake pies and cakes. I really hope that dream will come true after [sic] MMA career".

== Mixed martial arts record ==
Professional record breakdown
11 matches	10 wins	1 loss
By knockout	5	0
By submission	2	0
By decision	3	1

Res.	Record	Opponent	Method	Event	Date	Round	Time	Location	Notes
Loss	10–1	Jennifer Maia	Decision (unanimous)	Invicta FC 26: Maia vs. Niedźwiedź	December 8, 2017	5	5:00	Kansas City, United States	For the Invicta FC Flyweight Championship.
Win	10–0	Vanessa Porto	Decision (unanimous)	Invicta FC 23: Porto vs. Niedźwiedź	May 20, 2017	3	5:00	Kansas City, United States	
Win	9–0	Samara Santos	TKO (punches)	Ladies Fight Night 4: Fortuna Dies Natalis	December 17, 2016	3	3:10	Karpacz, Poland	
Win	8–0	Christine Stanley	Decision (unanimous)	Invicta FC 18: Grasso vs. Esquibel	July 29, 2016	3	5:00	Kansas City, United States	
Win	7–0	Julija Stoliarenko	TKO (elbows)	Fighters Arena 9	June 8, 2014	3	2:51	Józefów, Poland	
Win	6–0	Gemma Hewitt	Submission (triangle choke)	Cage Warriors 67	April 12, 2014	1	3:59	Swansea, United Kingdom	
Win	5–0	Kerry Hughes	Decision (unanimous)	Cage Warriors 62	December 7, 2013	3	5:00	Newcastle upon Tyne, United Kingdom	
Win	4–0	Iren Racz	Submission (armbar)	Immortals Fight Promotions 1	August 31, 2013	1	3:47	Aberdeen, United Kingdom	
Win	3–0	Klaudia Apenit	TKO (punches)	MMA Attack 3	April 27, 2013	2	4:03	Katowice, Poland	
Win	2–0	Joanna Ogrodnik	TKO (punches)	MMA Coloseum 12: The City of Kings	November 30, 2012	2	1:02	Kraków, Poland	
Win	1–0	Agnieszka Sobczyk	TKO (corner stoppage)	MMA Coloseum 11: Return of the King	October 26, 2012	1	3:24	Jaslo, Poland	
