= Niagara Bottling =

American beverage company

Niagara Bottling, LLC
- Type: Private
- Industry: Beverage
- Founded: 1963; 63 years ago Irvine, California, U.S.
- Founder: Andrew Peykoff Sr. II
- Headquarters: Diamond Bar, California, U.S.
- Key people: Andrew Peykoff Sr. Andrew Peykoff II
- Products: Bottled water, sparkling water, sports drinks
- Services: Private label bottling
- Owner: Peykoff family
- Number of employees: 7,000
- Website: niagarawater.com

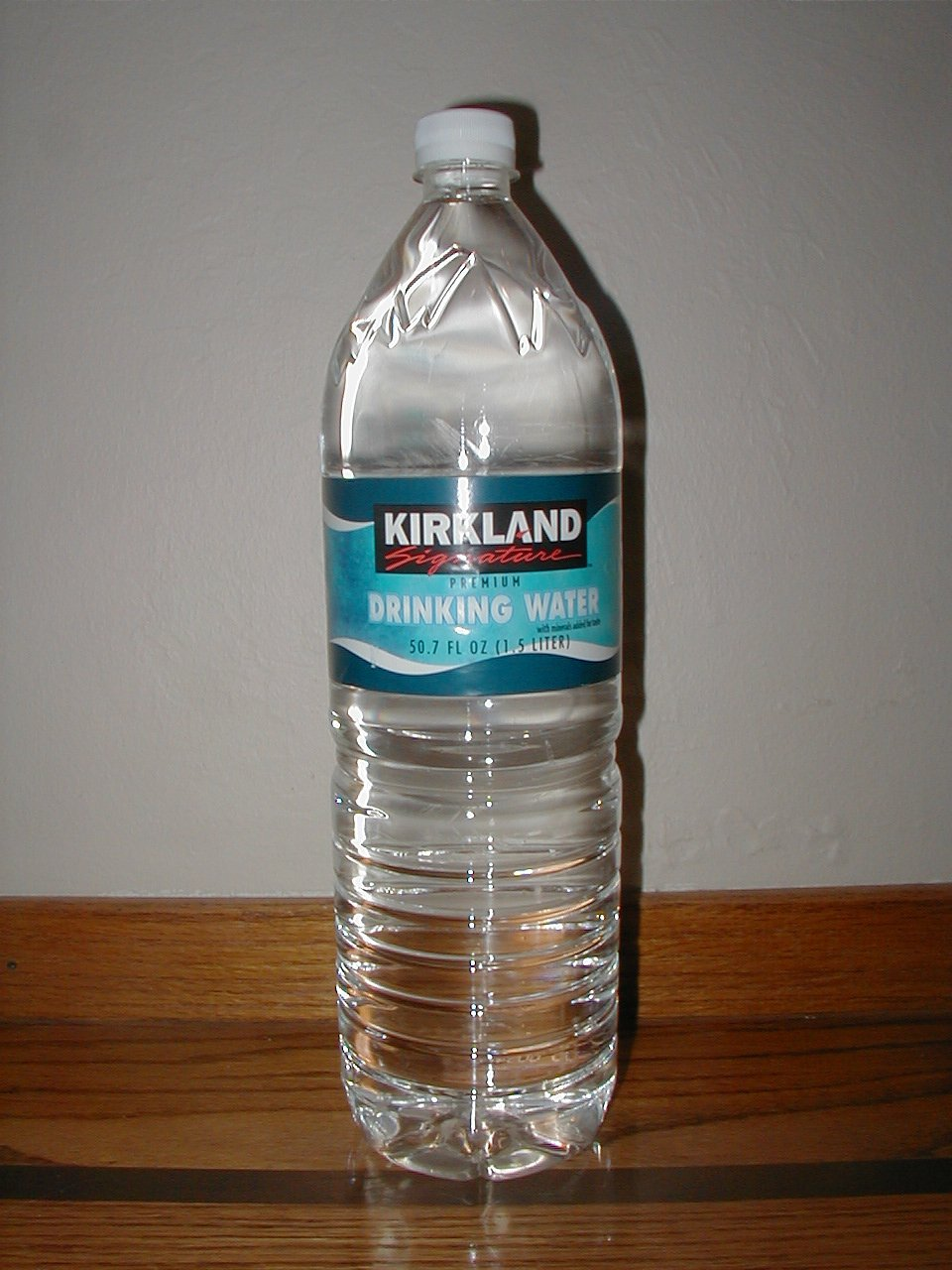
Kirkland Signature Drinking Water 1.5L

Niagara Bottling, LLC is an American manufacturer of bottled water and soft drinks based in Diamond Bar, California. They produce private label bottled water for a number of companies across North America. They operate more than 50 bottling plants in both the United States and Mexico, and employs more than 7,000 team members worldwide. As of 2017, Niagara was the largest supplier of private label bottled water in North America. Alongside producing for private label brands, the company also distributes water under their Niagara brand.

== Company history ==
The company was founded in 1963 in Irvine, California, by Andrew Peykoff Sr. and is currently run by Andy Peykoff II. Niagara began producing private label bottled water in the 1990s and has since gone national. Their private label clients include big box retailers, grocery stores, and convenience stores including Walmart, Costco and Meijer. In 2017, Niagara bought the bottling component of Pennsylvania based First Quality Water & Beverage. They subsequently closed the bottling plant, but retained the distribution network and private label bottling contracts.

== Private label brands ==
- Great Value (Walmart)
- Nice! (Walgreens)
- Good & Gather (Target)
- Food Lion Drinking Water (Food Lion)
- Signature Select (Albertsons)
- 7 Select (7-Eleven)
- PurAqua (Aldi)
- Kirkland Signature (Costco)
- Love’s Purified Drinking Water (Love's)
- Sunny Select (Save Mart Supermarkets)
- Epic Goods (BP)
- Members Mark (Sam's Club)
- Wellsley Farms (BJ's)
- Essential Everyday (UNFI)
- First Street (Smart & Final)
- Texas Spring Water (H-E-B)
- Brookshire’s bottled water
- Publix bottled water
- Kroger bottled water
- Nature’s Promise bottled water (Stop and Shop)
- Meijer bottled water
- Clover Valley (Dollar General)
- Winco Purified Drinking Water (Winco)

== Bottling plants ==
=== Mesa, Arizona ===
Niagara operates a 450,000 sq ft bottling plant in Mesa, Arizona. The plant has access to 40 million gallons of water a year, and can draw water from the Central Arizona Project, Salt River Project, and local groundwater.

=== Phoenix, Arizona ===
Niagara operates a 252,000 sq ft bottling plant in Phoenix, Arizona.

=== Bloomfield, Connecticut ===
Niagara operates a 400,000 sq ft bottling plant in Bloomfield, Connecticut. The facility receives water from the Metropolitan District Commission and the project has encountered public protest and opposition due to the secrecy with which the deal was brokered and a feeling that water is a public trust that shouldn’t be sold without public consultation.

=== Middleburg, Florida ===
In 2022, Niagara opened a bottling plant in Middleburg, Florida, just outside of Jacksonville, Florida.

=== Jeffersonville, Indiana ===
In 2018, Niagara began construction of a $56 million, 469,000 square foot bottling plant in Jeffersonville, Indiana.

=== Plainfield, Indiana ===
Niagara operates a bottling plant in Plainfield, Indiana. In 2018, they spent $62 million to expand the facility.

=== Byhalia, Mississippi ===
Opened in 2018, located in Byhalia, Mississippi, just outside of Memphis, Tennessee.

=== Kansas City, Missouri ===
In 2019, Niagara invested $68 million to build a 420,000 sq ft bottling plant in Kansas City, Missouri, bringing 50 jobs to the metro area.

=== Los Lunas, New Mexico ===
A Niagara bottling plant was opened in Los Lunas, New Mexico in 2016. A 2021 request for more water to expand the plant sparked protests. The request was withdrawn and later renewed in 2022, causing new opposition.

=== Mooresville, North Carolina ===
Niagara announced a bottling plant in Mooresville, North Carolina in 2011, for which they received a grant of $200,000 from the One North Carolina fund.

=== Findlay Township, Pennsylvania ===
In 2018, Niagara announced plans to build a $64 million bottling plant in Findlay Township, Pennsylvania outside of Pittsburgh.

=== Florence, South Carolina ===
In February 2020, Niagara announced plans to build a $70 million bottling plant in the Pee Dee Touchstone Energy Commerce Park northeast of Florence, South Carolina. Operations are expected to be online by the first quarter of 2021.

=== Seguin, Texas ===
In 2019, Niagara added additional infrastructure to their current output.

=== Chesterfield County, Virginia ===
In 2017, Niagara completed building a large bottling and warehouse facility in Chesterfield County, Virginia. The facility has 557,000 sq ft on 62 acres and uses 900,000gal of water a day.

=== Frederickson, Washington ===
A 311,000-square-foot bottling facility opened in Frederickson, Washington in 2014.

=== Hazle Township, Pennsylvania ===
Niagara Bottling is constructing a 1,190,000-square-foot production facility in the Humboldt Industrial Park in Hazle Township. The facility, which is expected to be operational in Spring, 2022, will serve customers in Pennsylvania and the northeast U.S.

=== Elko New Market, Minnesota ===
Niagara Bottling constructed a 425,000 square foot facility in Elko New Market’s I-35 Industrial Park in an investment worth $125 million. The plant obtains its water from the city’s existing water system via a transmission pipe already in place.

== See also ==
- Nestlé Waters North America
- List of bottled water brands
