= Andy Peykoff =

American businessman (born 1976)

Andrew Peykoff II (born 1976) is the owner and CEO of Niagara Bottling, the largest family-owned bottled water company in the United States. Niagara mainly bottles private label bottled drinking water for national supermarket chains, along with Wal-Mart's "Great Value" brand, Costco's "Kirkland" brand and Safeway's "Signature Select" brand. He is a second generation American of Macedonian descent.
