= Bellator 284 =

Bellator mixed martial arts event in 2022

Bellator 284: Gracie vs. Yamauchi
- The poster for Bellator 284: Gracie vs. Yamauchi
- Promotion: Bellator MMA
- Date: August 12, 2022
- Venue: Sanford Pentagon
- City: Sioux Falls, South Dakota, United States

Event chronology
Bellator 283: Lima vs. Jackson	Bellator 284: Gracie vs. Yamauchi	Bellator 285: Henderson vs. Queally

Bellator 284: Gracie vs. Yamauchi was a mixed martial arts event produced by Bellator MMA that took place on August 12, 2022, at Sanford Pentagon in Sioux Falls, South Dakota, United States.

== Background ==
The event marked the promotion's third visit to Sioux Falls and first since Bellator 265 in August 2021.

The event was headlined by a welterweight bout between Neiman Gracie and Goiti Yamauchi.

A bantamweight bout between Josh Hill and Matheus Mattos was scheduled for this event. However, Mattos pulled out due to a knee injury requiring knee surgery and was replaced by Marcos Breno.

A featherweight bout between Ilias Bulaid and Weber Almeida was scheduled to this event. However in July, the bout was scrapped for unknown reasons.

A bantamweight bout between Sarvadzhon Khamidov and Jared Scoggins was scheduled for this event. However, the bout was scrapped for unknown reasons

A middleweight bout between Austin Vanderford and Anthony Adams was scheduled for this event. However after Adams pulled out of the bout 2 weeks before the event, Aaron Jeffery stepped in on short notice.

At weigh ins, three fighters missed weight; Ilima-Lei Macfarlane, who was three pounds over the division non-title fight limit at 129 lbs, Justine Kish who came in at 128.4 lbs for their flyweight bout, and Nick Perez who came in at 157.4 lbs for his lightweight bout. Macfarlane and Kish were fined a percentage of their purses and the bouts continued at catchweights, while Perez's bout against Isaiah Hokit was scrapped.

== Results ==
Main Card (Showtime)
Weight class				Method	Round	Time	Notes
Welterweight	Goiti Yamauchi	def.	Neiman Gracie	KO (punches)	2	3:58
Heavyweight	Valentin Moldavsky	vs.	Steve Mowry	No Contest (accidental eye poke)	1	0:54
Catchweight (129 lbs)	Ilima-Lei Macfarlane	def.	Bruna Ellen	Decision (unanimous) (29–28, 29–28, 30–27)	3	5:00	(Note: Macfarlane missed weight (129 lbs))
Heavyweight	Gokhan Saricam	def.	Said Sowma	Decision (split) (29-28, 28-29, 29-28)	3	5:00
Middleweight	Aaron Jeffery	def.	Austin Vanderford	TKO (punches)	1	1:25
Preliminary card (Youtube/Pluto TV)
Bantamweight	Marcos Breno	def.	Josh Hill	Decision (unanimous) (30–27, 29–28, 29–28)	3	5:00
Catchweight (128.4 lbs)	DeAnna Bennett	def.	Justine Kish	Decision (unanimous) (29–28, 29–28, 29–28)	3	5:00	(Note: Kish missed weight (128.4 lbs))
Light Heavyweight	Sullivan Cauley	def.	Tyson Jeffries	KO (knee)	1	1:39
Middleweight	Pat Downey	def.	Keyes Nelson	Submission (arm-triangle choke)	1	0:36
Heavyweight	Bailey Schoenfelder	def.	Mark Currier	Submission (rear-naked choke)	2	2:35
Bantamweight	Mitchell McKee	def.	Tony Ortega	TKO (punches)	2	1:28
Amateur Bout
Catchweight (175 lb)	Mayah Li	def.	Brett Bye	Decision (unanimous) (30–27, 30–27, 30–27)	3	5:00

== See also ==
- 2022 in Bellator MMA
- List of Bellator MMA events
- List of current Bellator fighters
