= Dayana Silva =

Brazilian mixed martial arts fighter

- Born: August 17, 1990 (age 36); Nova Iguaçu, Brazil
- Height: 5 ft 7 in (1.70 m)
- Weight: 145 lb (66 kg; 10 st 5 lb)
- Division: Featherweight
- Reach: 68.5 in (174 cm)
- Style: Muay Thai
- Fighting out of: Nova Iguacu, Rio de Janeiro, Brazil
- Team: Nova União
- Years active: 2009–present

Mixed martial arts record
- Total: 19
- Wins: 10
- By knockout: 2
- By decision: 8
- Losses: 9
- By knockout: 2
- By decision: 7

Other information
- Mixed martial arts record from Sherdog

Dayana Silva (born August 17, 1990) is a Brazilian female mixed martial artist who competes in the Featherweight division. A professional MMA fighter since 2009, she has formerly competed in Bellator MMA.

== Background ==
Discovered in a Muay Thai social project at a public school in Rio, Dayana Silva became an MMA athlete almost by chance. After a successful debut in professional Muay Thai, she was invited at the last minute to face the already experienced Carina Damm, who at the time already had 15 MMA fights, in the renowned Bitetti Combat event, in 2009. Despite the defeat by TKO in the third round, she was sure the four-ounce glove would be her working tool from now on.

Silva was a clinical pathology technician, balancing work and training afterwards everyday, before quitting in 2015 to focus full time on MMA.

== Mixed martial arts career ==
=== Early career ===
Going 7–3 on the Brazilian regional scene, with the other two losses besides her debut coming against future UFC fighters Juliana Lima and Jennifer Maia, Silva was invited to Dana White's Contender Series Brazil 3 on August 11, 2018, and faced Gisele Moreira. She lost the bout via split decision.

A year later after the loss, Silva faced Sidy Rocha at Shooto Brasil 95 for the vacant Shooto Brazil Bantamweight Championship. She won the bout and the title via unanimous decision.

On a month's notice, Silva competed in the one night Shooto Brasil Women's Lightweight Grand Prix on March 1, 2020, with the winner gaining a contract for the 2021 Professional Fighters League season. Silva started the event by facing Mariana Morais. In a tough fight, she lost by split decision.

At Shooto Brasil 100, Silva faced Tayná Lamounier, winning the bout via unanimous decision.

=== Bellator MMA ===
On March 10, 2021, it was announced Silva had signed a 3 bout contract with Bellator MMA.

Silva was initially expected to face former Bellator Women's Featherweight Champion Julia Budd at Bellator 256 on April 9, 2021. However, the fight was rescheduled and eventually took place on April 16, 2021, at Bellator 257. Silva lost the bout via split decision.

Silva faced Arlene Blencowe on July 16, 2021, at Bellator 262. She lost the bout via TKO in the third round.

Silva faced Janay Harding on April 23, 2022, at Bellator 279. She won the bout via unanimous decision.

Silva faced Leah McCourt on September 23, 2022, at Bellator 285. She lost the fight by unanimous decision.

Silva faced Katerina Shakalova on August 11, 2023, at Bellator 298. She lost the fight via split decision.

== Championships and accomplishments ==
- Shooto Brazil
  - Shooto Brazil Bantamweight Championship (One time)

== Mixed martial arts record ==
Professional record breakdown
19 matches	10 wins	9 losses
By knockout	2	2
By decision	8	7

Res.	Record	Opponent	Method	Event	Date	Round	Time	Location	Notes
Loss	10–9	Katerina Shakalova	Decision (split)	Bellator 298	August 11, 2023	3	5:00	Sioux Falls, South Dakota, United States	
Loss	10–8	Leah McCourt	Decision (unanimous)	Bellator 285	September 23, 2022	3	5:00	Dublin, Ireland	
Win	10–7	Janay Harding	Decision (unanimous)	Bellator 279	April 23, 2022	3	5:00	Honolulu, Hawaii, United States	
Loss	9–7	Arlene Blencowe	TKO (punches)	Bellator 262	July 16, 2021	3	1:00	Uncasville, Connecticut, United States	
Loss	9–6	Julia Budd	Decision (split)	Bellator 257	April 16, 2021	3	5:00	Uncasville, Connecticut, United States	Featherweight debut.
Win	9–5	Tayná Lamounier	Decision (unanimous)	Shooto Brasil 100	August 23, 2020	3	5:00	Rio de Janeiro, Brazil	Catchweight (139 lb) bout.
Loss	8–5	Mariana Morais	Decision (split)	Shooto Brasil: Grand Prix	March 1, 2020	3	5:00	Rio de Janeiro, Brazil	Lightweight bout.
Win	8–4	Sidy Rocha	Decision (unanimous)	Shooto Brasil 95	September 6, 2019	3	5:00	Rio de Janeiro, Brazil	Won the vacant Shooto Brazil Bantamweight Championship.
Loss	7–4	Gisele Moreira	Decision (split)	Dana White's Contender Series Brazil 3	August 11, 2018	3	5:00	Las Vegas, Nevada, United States	
Win	7–3	Juliete de Souza	Decision (unanimous)	Cruzeiro Fight 1	October 20, 2017	3	5:00	Rio de Janeiro, Brazil	
Loss	6–3	Jennifer Maia	Decision (majority)	Imortal FC 2: Kamikaze	December 13, 2015	3	5:00	São José dos Pinhais, Brazil	
Win	6–2	Núbia Nascimento	Decision (unanimous)	Belford Fight: Super Challenge	November 7, 2015	3	5:00	Belford Roxo, Brazil	
Win	5–2	Mayara Aguiar	TKO (punches)	Pink Fight 3	January 18, 2014	1	2:02	Campos dos Goytacazes, Brazil	
Win	4–2	Weyde Ventura	TKO (punches)	Gladiators Extreme Fight	June 11, 2011	3	N/A	São João de Meriti, Brazil	
Win	3–2	Aline Nery	Decision (unanimous)	Gringo Super Fight 3	May 29, 2011	3	5:00	Nova Iguaçu, Brazil	
Loss	2–2	Juliana Lima	Decision (unanimous)	Brasil Fight 4: The VIP Night	April 9, 2011	3	5:00	Nova Lima, Brazil	
Win	2–1	Roberta Torno	Decision (unanimous)	88 Fight Championship	September 18, 2010	3	5:00	Rio de Janeiro, Brazil	
Win	1–1	Luciana Pereira	Decision (split)	Gringo Super Fight 2	August 15, 2010	3	5:00	Nova Iguaçu, Brazil	
Loss	0–1	Carina Damm	TKO (punches)	Bitetti Combat 5	December 12, 2009	3	3:27	Barueri, Brazil	Bantamweight debut.

== See also ==
- List of female mixed martial artists
