= Vosges (chocolatier) =

Chicago chocolate maker

Vosges Haut-Chocolat
- Founded: 1998
- Founder: Katrina Markoff
- Headquarters: Chicago, Illinois
- Products: Chocolate

Vosges Haut-Chocolat is a Chicago-based luxury chocolate maker, founded in 1998 by Katrina Markoff, that offers varieties flavored with spices, bacon, and other ingredients. It is owned by La Montagne Holdings.

The company produces many unique flavor combinations, including Red Fire Chocolat, made with Mexican chilis, cinnamon and dark chocolate, Black Pearl Chocolat made with ginger, black sesame seeds and dark chocolate, and Mo's Milk Chocolate Bacon Bar. A novelty at the time, it started a trend.

The company features different gourmet chocolates at their Chicago boutiques.

Vosges offers flavors including Red Fire Toffee, Red Fire Spice, and a Oaxaca blend. Huffington Post's reviewers also gave the chocolates high marks, noting the unusual offerings, such as Wild Tuscan Fennel Pollen, with Floral Anise, and Ginger plus Fresh Wasabi, with Black Sesame Seeds.
