= List of Czech UFC fighters =

Ultimate Fighting Championship

The Ultimate Fighting Championship (UFC) is a mixed martial arts (MMA) promotion, founded in 1993 by Art Davie and Rorion Gracie. The organization was purchased from its parent company SEG in 2001 by Zuffa LLC, a promotional company owned by Las Vegas casino magnates, Lorenzo and Frank Fertitta and managed by Dana White (current president of operations). Since its inception, and through its current Zuffa management, the UFC has remained one of the more dominant MMA promotions in the world, playing host to a wide field of MMA fighters.

This list provides an up-to-date roster of all mixed martial artists with Czech citizenship that represent Czech Republic competing or have previously competed under the UFC promotional banner. (Note: Unless otherwise cited, all mixed martial artists listed are retrieved from ufc.com.) (Note: All names presented are in accordance with UFC.com profiles and may include common nicknames or alternative spellings rather than birth names.) Fighters are organized by weight class and within their weight class by their number of appearances inside the UFC. Fighter record and notable wins, achievements. Tournament participation and overall UFC/MMA records (Note: Unless otherwise cited, all records are retrieved from sherdog.com.) In 2022, Jiří Procházka became the Czech Republic's first UFC Champion after defeating Glover Teixeira for the Light Heavyweight title at UFC 275.

Each fight record has four categories: wins, losses, draws, and no-contests (NC). All fight records in this article are displayed in that order, with fights resulting in a no-contest listed in parentheses.

== List ==
Name	Nickname	Class	Sex	UFC record	MMA record	Events	Notes	Notable Wins	Ref.
Karlos Vemola	The Terminator	Heavyweight, Light Heavyweight and Middleweight	Male	2-4	36-8	UFC 116; UFC 122; UFC Live: Hardy vs. Lytle; UFC on Fox: Diaz vs. Miller; UFC on Fuel TV: Munoz vs. Weidman; UFC on Fuel TV: Nogueira vs. Werdum	First mixed martial artist from the Czech Republic to compete in UFC.	Seth Petruzelli; Mike Massenzio	
Viktor Pešta		Heavyweight	Male	1-4	10-4	UFC Fight Night: Munoz vs. Mousasi; UFC on Fox: Gustafsson vs. Johnson; UFC 192; UFC Fight Night: Rodríguez vs. Caceres; UFC Fight Night: Rodríguez vs. Penn		Konstantin Erokhin	
Lucie Pudilová	Bullet	Bantamweight	Female	3-7	14-9	UFC Fight Night: Manuwa vs. Anderson; UFC Fight Night: Holm vs. Correia; UFC Fight Night: Cowboy vs. Medeiros; UFC 228; UFC Fight Night: Błachowicz vs. Santos; UFC on ESPN 5 UFC Fight Night: Blaydes vs. dos Santos UFC on ESPN: Holloway vs. Allen UFC Fight Night: Allen vs. Craig	First female mixed martial artist from the Czech Republic to compete in UFC.	Ji Yeon Kim; Sarah Moras	
David Dvořák	Undertaker	Flyweight	Male	3-3	20-6	UFC Fight Night: Lee vs. Oliveira; UFC Fight Night: Moraes vs. Sandhagen; UFC Fight Night: Font vs. Garbrandt; UFC on ESPN: Blaydes vs. Daukaus		Bruno Silva; Jordan Espinosa; Juancamilo Ronderos	
Jiří Procházka	Denisa/BJP	Light Heavyweight	Male	4-1	30-4-1	UFC 251; UFC on ESPN: Reyes vs. Procházka; UFC 275 UFC 295 UFC 300	First Czech UFC Champion.	Volkan Oezdemir; Dominick Reyes; Glover Teixeira Aleksandar Rakić	
Tereza Bledá		Flyweight	Female	1-1	7-1	UFC Fight Night: Nzechukwu vs. Cuțelaba UFC on ESPN: Vettori vs. Cannonier			
