= 2009 in Jewels =

Mixed martial arts events

Information
- First date: February 4, 2009
- Last date: December 11, 2009

Events
- Total events: 6

Fights
- Title fights: 46

Chronology
2008 in Jewels	2009 in Jewels	2010 in Jewels

The year 2009 is the 2nd year in the history of Jewels, a mixed martial arts promotion based in Japan. In 2009 Jewels held 6 events beginning with, Jewels 2nd Ring.

== Events list ==
#	Event Title	Date	Arena	Location	Attendance
8	Jewels 6th Ring	December 11, 2009	Shinjuku Face	Tokyo, Japan	762
7	Jewels 5th Ring	September 13, 2009	Shinjuku Face	Tokyo, Japan	610
5	Jewels 4th Ring	July 11, 2009	Shin-Kiba 1st Ring	Tokyo, Japan	464
4	Jewels 3rd Ring	May 16, 2009	Shinjuku Face	Tokyo, Japan	734
3	Jewels: Rough Stone: First Ring	April 19, 2009	Isami Wrestle Budokan	Wairabi, Saitama, Japan	
2	Jewels 2nd Ring	February 4, 2009	Shinjuku Face	Tokyo, Japan	588

== Jewels 2nd Ring ==
Jewels 2nd Ring was an event held on February 4, 2009 at Shinjuku Face in Tokyo, Japan.

=== Results ===
Main Card
Weight class				Method	Round	Time	Notes
	Saori Ishioka	def.	Hanako Kobayashi	TKO (Punches)	1	2:20
	Hiroko Yamanaka	def.	Michiko Takeda	TKO (Punches)	2	3:25
	Yasuko Tamada	def.	Misaki Takimoto	Decision (Unanimous)	2	5:00
	Mayumi Aoki	def.	Chihiro Oikawa	Submission (Armbar)	2	2:30
	Masako Yoshida	def.	Misaki Ozawa	TKO (Doctor Stoppage)	1	0:54
	Shizuka Sugiyama	def.	Shiho Shiho	TKO (Knees to the Body and Punches)	1	2:55
	Rina Tomita	def.	Harumi Harumi	Submission (Armbar)	2	0:22
	Miyoko Kusaka	def.	Satoko Kameda	Submission (Guillotine Choke)	1	2:23

== Jewels: Rough Stone: First Ring ==
Jewels: Rough Stone: First Ring was an event held on April 19, 2009 at the Isami Wrestle Budokan in Wairabi, Saitama, Japan.

=== Results ===
Main Card
Weight class				Method	Round	Time	Notes
	Yuko Oya	def.	Yoko Kagoshima	KO (Punch)	1	1:45
	Hiroko Kitamura	vs.	Ayaka Hamasaki	Draw	1	4:00
	Ayaka Hamasaki	def.	Yoko Kagoshima	Submission (Armbar)	1	3:29
	Hiroko Kitamura	def.	Yuko Oya	Decision (Unanimous)	1	4:00

== Jewels 3rd Ring ==
Jewels 3rd Ring was an event held on May 16, 2009 at Shinjuku Face in Tokyo, Japan.

=== Results ===
Main Card
Weight class				Method	Round	Time	Notes
	Hiroko Yamanaka	def.	Shannon Hooper	Decision (Unanimous)	2	5:00
	Misaki Takimoto	def.	Yukiko Seki	Submission (Armbar)	1	3:40
	Shizuka Sugiyama	def.	Celine Haga	Decision (Unanimous)	2	5:00
	Mika Nagano	def.	Misaki Ozawa	Technical Submission (Armbar)	1	2:09
	Chihiro Oikawa	def.	Harumi Harumi	Submission (Armbar)	1	2:22
	Yuko Oya	def.	Hanako Kobayashi	Decision (Unanimous)	2	5:00
	Miki Morifuji	def.	Mayu Yamagishi	KO (Punches)	1	0:16
	Hiroko Kitamura	def.	Emi Murata	Submission (Armbar)	1	2:31
	Miyoko Kusaka	def.	Yoko Kagoshima	Submission (Rear-Naked Choke)	1	2:50

== Jewels 4th Ring ==
Jewels 4th Ring was an event held on July 11, 2009 at Shin-Kiba 1st Ring in Tokyo, Japan.

=== Results ===
Main Card
Weight class				Method	Round	Time	Notes
	Megumi Fujii	def.	Saori Ishioka	Submission (Armbar)	2	4:17
	Hitomi Akano	def.	Miki Morifuji	Technical Submission (Straight Armbar)	2	4:17
	Mika Nagano	def.	Rina Tomita	Submission (Armbar)	2	0:35
	Shizuka Sugiyama	def.	Mika Harigai	Decision (Unanimous)	2	5:00
	Asami Kodera	def.	Yukiko Seki	Submission (Armbar)	1	4:47
	Mutsumi Kasai	def.	Celine Haga	Submission (Kimura)	1	3:06
	Hiroko Kitamura	def.	Harumi Harumi	Submission (Triangle Choke)	1	3:51
	Ayaka Hamasaki	def.	Miyoko Kusaka	Technical Submission (Armbar)	1	1:07
	Emi Murata	def.	Yoko Kagoshima	TKO (Punches)	1	0:53

== Jewels 5th Ring ==
Jewels 5th Ring was an event held on September 13, 2009 at Shinjuku Face in Tokyo, Japan.

=== Results ===
Main Card
Weight class				Method	Round	Time	Notes
	Seo Hee Ham	def.	Misaki Takimoto	Decision (Unanimous)	2	5:00
	Megumi Yabushita	def.	Atsuko Emoto	Submission (Armbar)	1	2:43
	Alexandra Buch	def.	Shizuka Sugiyama	Decision (Unanimous)	2	5:00
	Tomoko Morii	def.	Chihiro Oikawa	Submission (Armbar)	1	4:13
	Mika Nagano	def.	Rina Tomita	Technical Submission (Armbar)	1	2:25
	Yoko Kagoshima	def.	Yuko Oya	Decision (Unanimous)	2	5:00
	Asami Kodera	def.	Misaki Ozawa	Submission (Triangle Armbar)	2	1:56
	Kikuyo Ishikawa	def.	Asako Saioka	Submission (Rear-Naked Choke)	1	1:18

== Jewels 6th Ring ==
Jewels 6th Ring was an event held on December 11, 2009 at Shinjuku Face in Tokyo, Japan.

=== Results ===
Main Card
Weight class				Method	Round	Time	Notes
	Saori Ishioka	def.	Sally Krumdiack	Technical Submission (Armbar)	1	2:45
	Asami Kodera	def.	Kikuyo Ishikawa	Decision (Unanimous)	2	5:00
	Mika Nagano	def.	Yoko Kagoshima	Submission (Armbar)	2	3:56
	Alexandra Buch	def.	Tomoko Morii	Submission (Armbar)	1	3:39
	Shizuka Sugiyama	def.	Yukiko Ozeki	Decision (Unanimous)	2	5:00
	Mari Kaneko	def.	Rina Tomita	Decision (Unanimous)	2	5:00
	Misaki Ozawa	def.	Yumiko Inoue	Decision (Unanimous)	2	5:00
	Yoko Yamada	def.	Miyoko Kusaka	Decision (Unanimous)	2	5:00

== See also ==
- Jewels
