= Antonina Shevchenko =

Kyrgyzstani-Peruvian mixed martial artist and Muay Thai fighter

- Born: Antonina Anatolyevna Shevchenko; November 20, 1984 (age 41); Frunze, Kirghiz SSR, Soviet Union (today Bishkek, Kyrgyzstan)
- Native name: Антонина Шевченко
- Other names: La Pantera
- Nationality: Kyrgyz; Peruvian
- Height: 5 ft 8 in (1.73 m)
- Weight: 125 lb (57 kg; 8.9 st)
- Division: Bantamweight (126–135 Ib) (MMA); Flyweight (116–125 Ib) (MMA); Lightweight (Kickboxing)
- Reach: 68 in (173 cm)
- Style: Muay Thai, Kickboxing
- Stance: Southpaw
- Fighting out of: Bishkek, Kyrgyzstan
- Team: Tiger Muay Thai
- Trainer: Pavel Fedotov
- Years active: 2003–2022

Kickboxing record
- Total: 40
- Wins: 39
- By knockout: 6
- Losses: 1

Mixed martial arts record
- Total: 14
- Wins: 10
- By knockout: 3
- By submission: 1
- By decision: 6
- Losses: 4
- By knockout: 1
- By submission: 1
- By decision: 2

Other information
- Notable relatives: Valentina Shevchenko (sister)
- Mixed martial arts record from Sherdog

Antonina Anatolyevna Shevchenko (Russian: Антонина Анатольевна Шевченко; born November 20, 1984) is a Kyrgyz and Peruvian retired Muay Thai fighter and mixed martial artist who competed in the women's Flyweight division of the Ultimate Fighting Championship (UFC). She is the older sister of current UFC fighter Valentina Shevchenko.

== Muay Thai and kickboxing ==
Between 2003 and 2017 Antonina Shevchenko participated in 40 professional kickboxing and muay thai fights, winning 39 and losing only one, to Yulia Voskoboynik. She won 4 gold medals and a single bronze and silver medal at the IFMA world championships, as well as a silver medal at the IFMA Royal World Cup. She is also the former WKC K1 and Muay Thai Champion, the former Phoenix FC Muay Thai Champion, and the former Lion Fight Muay Thai Champion with two title defenses.

== Mixed martial arts career ==
=== Early career ===
Antonina Shevchenko made her MMA debut in 2002 and compiled a 3–0 record before taking a twelve-year hiatus from the sport. In 2017, she returned to MMA, building her record to 7–1.

=== Dana White's Tuesday Night Contender Series ===
Shevchenko next competed on the second season of Dana White's Tuesday Night Contender Series, where fighters compete for the chance of being awarded a contract with the UFC. She was scheduled to face Silvana Juarez at Dana White's Tuesday Night Contender Series 11 on June 26, 2018, however, 8 days before the fight it was announced that Juarez was forced out of the bout with an undisclosed injury. As a result, she was replaced by Jaimelene Nievera. Shevchenko won the fight via TKO in the second round after delivering multiple unanswered knees from the clinch. Her win earned her a contract with the UFC.

=== Ultimate Fighting Championship ===
Shevchenko was expected to make her promotional debut against Ashlee Evans-Smith on November 30, 2018, at The Ultimate Fighter 28 Finale. However, it was reported on 8 November 2018 that Evans-Smith pulled out of the event due to injury and she was replaced by Ji Yeon Kim. At the weigh-ins, Ji Yeon Kim weighed in at 130.5 pounds, 4.5 pounds over the flyweight non-title fight limit of 126. She was fined 20 percent of her purse, which went to her opponent Shevchenko. The bout proceeded at catchweight. She won the fight via unanimous decision.

Shevchenko faced Roxanne Modafferi on April 20, 2019, at UFC on ESPN+ 7. She lost the fight via split decision.

Shevchenko faced Lucie Pudilová on August 3, 2019, at UFC on ESPN 5. She won the fight via technical submission due to a rear-naked choke in the second round. The win also earned her the Fight of the Night bonus award.

Shevchenko was scheduled to face Cynthia Calvillo on April 25, 2020. However, on April 9, Dana White, the president of UFC announced that this event was postponed to a future date Instead, Shevchenko faced Katlyn Chookagian on May 30, 2020, at UFC on ESPN: Woodley vs. Burns. She lost the fight by unanimous decision after being dominated for 3 rounds.

Shevchenko faced Ariane Lipski on November 21, 2020, at UFC 255. She won the fight via technical knockout. This win earned her the Performance of the Night award.

Shevchenko faced Andrea Lee on May 15, 2021, at UFC 262. She lost the bout via triangle armbar at the end of the second round.

Shevchenko faced Casey O'Neill on October 2, 2021, at UFC Fight Night: Santos vs. Walker. She lost the fight via technical knockout in round two.

Shevchenko was scheduled to face Cortney Casey on April 30, 2022, at UFC on ESPN 35. However, the bout was postponed to July 9, 2022, at UFC on ESPN 39, as Shevchenko injured her knee in training. Shevchenko won the fight via split decision.

On March 26, 2025, Shevchenko announced her retirement from combat sports in order to focus on her career as a pilot.

== Championships and accomplishments ==
=== Muay Thai ===
- 2017 WMC Muaythai Female Super Lightweight World Champion
- 2017 Phoenix Fighting Championship Muay Thai World Champion.
- Lion Fight Lightweight Muay Thai World Championship
  - Two successful title defenses
- 2016 Gold medal - IFMA Amateur Muay Thai World Championships (63.5 kg)
- 2014 Gold medal - IFMA Amateur Muay Thai World Championships (63.5 kg)
- 2014 W.K.C. Muay Thai World Champion (63.5 kg)
- 2013 W.K.C. K1 World Champion (63.5 kg)
- 2011 Gold medal - IFMA Amateur Muay Thai World Championships (63.5 kg)
- 2008 Bronze medal - IFMA Amateur Muay Thai World Championships (60 kg)
- 2008 Gold medal - RMF Amateur Muay Thai Russian National Championships (60 kg)
- 2007 Silver medal - IFMA Amateur Muay Thai World Championships (60 kg)
- 2007 Gold medal - RMF Amateur Muay Thai Russian National Championships (60 kg)
- 2003 Gold medal - IFMA Amateur Muay Thai World Championships (60 kg)

=== Taekwondo ===
- 2005 ITF and WTF European Championship, Gold Medal (63 kg)
- 2005 ITF and WTF European Championship Team Pattern, Gold Medal
- 2003 ITF World Championship, Silver Medal (63 kg)
- 2002 ITF Asian Championship, Gold Medal (58 kg)
- 1998 ITF World Championship, Bronze Medal (58 kg)

=== Mixed martial arts ===
- Ultimate Fighting Championship
  - Fight of the Night (One time) vs. Lucie Pudilová
  - Performance of the Night (One time) vs. Ariane Lipski

== Personal life ==
Shevchenko's family is of Ukrainian origin. She's the older sister of fellow MMA fighter and current UFC Flyweight champion Valentina Shevchenko. Antonina and Valentina made UFC history by becoming the first pair of sisters to fight on the same card at UFC 255. Shevchenko is a licensed commercial pilot. On September 8, 2024, Antonina gave birth to a boy.

== Mixed martial arts record ==
Professional record breakdown
14 matches	10 wins	4 losses
By knockout	3	1
By submission	1	1
By decision	6	2

Res.	Record	Opponent	Method	Event	Date	Round	Time	Location	Notes
Win	10–4	Cortney Casey	Decision (split)	UFC on ESPN: dos Anjos vs. Fiziev	July 9, 2022	3	5:00	Las Vegas, Nevada, United States	
Loss	9–4	Casey O'Neill	TKO (punches)	UFC Fight Night: Santos vs. Walker	October 2, 2021	2	4:47	Las Vegas, Nevada, United States	
Loss	9–3	Andrea Lee	Submission (triangle armbar)	UFC 262	May 15, 2021	2	4:52	Houston, Texas, United States	
Win	9–2	Ariane Lipski	TKO (punches)	UFC 255	November 21, 2020	2	4:33	Las Vegas, Nevada, United States	Performance of the Night.
Loss	8–2	Katlyn Chookagian	Decision (unanimous)	UFC on ESPN: Woodley vs. Burns	May 30, 2020	3	5:00	Las Vegas, Nevada, United States	
Win	8–1	Lucie Pudilová	Technical Submission (rear-naked choke)	UFC on ESPN: Covington vs. Lawler	August 3, 2019	2	1:20	Newark, New Jersey, United States	Fight of the Night.
Loss	7–1	Roxanne Modafferi	Decision (split)	UFC Fight Night: Overeem vs. Oleinik	April 20, 2019	3	5:00	Saint Petersburg, Russia	
Win	7–0	Ji Yeon Kim	Decision (unanimous)	The Ultimate Fighter: Heavy Hitters Finale	November 30, 2018	3	5:00	Las Vegas, Nevada, United States	Catchweight (130.5 lb) bout; Kim missed weight.
Win	6–0	Jaymee Nievara	TKO (knees)	Dana White's Tuesday Night Contender Series 2	June 26, 2018	2	3:22	Las Vegas, Nevada, United States	Flyweight debut.
Win	5–0	Valérie Domergue	Decision (unanimous)	Phoenix FC 4: Dubai	December 22, 2017	3	5:00	Dubai, United Arab Emirates	
Win	4–0	Anissa Haddaoui	Decision (unanimous)	Phoenix FC 3: UK vs. The World	September 22, 2017	3	5:00	London, England	
Win	3–0	Hyun Seong Kim	Decision (unanimous)	WXF: X-Impact World Championships 2005	July 9, 2005	3	5:00	Seoul, South Korea	
Win	2–0	Hyun Seong Kim	Decision (unanimous)	WXF: X-Impact World Championships 2003	December 3, 2003	3	2:00	Seoul, South Korea	
Win	1–0	Anara Bayanova	TKO (punches)	KFK: Cup of Kyrgyzstan	April 15, 2002	2	N/A	Bishkek, Kyrgyzstan	

== Professional kickboxing and Muay Thai record (incomplete) ==
Kickboxing and Muay Thai record (Incomplete)
39 Wins (6 (T)KO, decisions), 1 Loss, 0 Draws
Date	Result	Opponent	Event	Location	Method	Round	Time	Record
April 29, 2017	Win	(Sweden) Isa Tidblad Keskikangas	Phoenix Fighting Championships	Zouk Mosbeh, Lebanon	Decision	5	3:00	N/A
Won the WMC and Phoenix FC World championships
November 18, 2016	Win	(Netherlands) Ilona Wijmans	Lion Fight 33	Mashantucket, Connecticut, United States	Decision (Unanimous)	5	3:00	N/A
Retained the Lion Fight Lightweight championship
September 2, 2016	Win	(Italy) Paola Cappucci	Lion Fight 31	Mashantucket, Connecticut, United States	Decision (Unanimous)	5	3:00	N/A
Won the Lion Fight Lightweight championship
February 2, 2016	Win	(France) Laetitia Bakissy	Enfusion Live Season 6	Koh Samui, Thailand	Decision (Unanimous)	N/A	3:00	N/A
Won Tournament Final
January 28, 2016	Win	(Netherlands) Shana Lammers	Enfusion Live Season 6	Koh Samui, Thailand	TKO	3	N/A	N/A
Tournament Semi-final
March 27, 2014	Win	(Mexico) Yajaira Manzanares	WKC K-1 World Championships 2014	Lima, Peru	Decision	5	3:00	N/A
Retained the WKC K-1 Light Welterweight World Championship -63.5 kg
June 1, 2013	Win	(Mexico) Zoe Rodriguez	WKC K-1 World Championships 2013	Mexico	KO (Punches)	1	N/A	N/A
Won the WKC K-1 Light Welterweight World Championship -63.5 kg
August 24, 2012	Win	(Argentina) Paola Bernachea	K-1 event in Peru	Lima, Peru	Decision (Unanimous)	4	2:00	N/A
May 16, 2011	Win	(Argentina) Andrea Salazar	Muay Thai event in Argentina	Buenos Aires, Argentina	Decision (Unanimous)	N/A	N/A	N/A
February 13, 2011	Win	(Chile) Caroline Rodriguez	MAF	Lima, Peru	Decision (Unanimous)	4	2:00	N/A
January 10, 2011	Win	(Italy) Chantal Ughi	Muay Thai event in Thailand	Koh Samui, Thailand	Decision (Unanimous)	4	2:00	N/A
December 14, 2010	Win	(Thailand) Kwanta Soonkeeranakornsree	Andaman Coast Muay Thai Championship	Phuket, Thailand	TKO (Body kick and punch)	3	1:40	N/A
February 6, 2010	Win	(Venezuela) Heilyn Rios	K-1 event in Peru	Lima, Peru	TKO	1	N/A	N/A
2006	Win	(Russia) Lyubov Lopatina	Muay Thai event in Russia	Krasnodar, Russia	Decision (Unanimous)	N/A	N/A	N/A
February 2003	Loss	(Russia) Yulia Voskoboynik	Kickboxing event in Oman	Muscat, Oman	Decision	N/A	N/A	N/A
2003	Win	(Kazakhstan) Elvira Tashim	Kickboxing event in Kyrgyzstan	Bishkek, Kyrgyzstan	TKO (Axe kick)	2	N/A	N/A

Amateur Kickboxing and Muay Thai record (Incomplete)
Date	Result	Opponent	Event	Location	Method	Round	Time
2016-05-28	Win	(Russia) Svetlana Vinnikova	I.F.M.A. World Championship Tournament 2016, Finals -63.5 kg	Jönköping, Sweden	Decision	N/A	N/A
Won the I.F.M.A. World Championship Tournament Gold Medal -63.5 kg.
2016-05-26	Win	(Turkey) Kybra Akbulut	I.F.M.A. World Championship Tournament 2016, Semi-finals -63.5 kg	Jönköping, Sweden	Decision	3	N/A
2016-05-24	Win	(Morocco) Oumayma Belashib	I.F.M.A. World Championship Tournament 2016, Quarter Finals -63.5 kg	Jönköping, Sweden	Decision	3	N/A
2015-08-20	Win	(Russia) Svetlana Vinnikova	I.F.M.A. Royal Cup 2015, Semi Finals -63.5 kg	Bangkok, Thailand	Decision (Unanimous)	3	3:00
2015-08-17	Win	(Morocco) Soukaina Naili	I.F.M.A. Royal Cup 2015, Quarter Finals -63.5 kg	Bangkok, Thailand	Decision (Unanimous)	3	3:00
2014-05-?	Win	(Australia) Melissa Anderson	I.F.M.A. World Championship Tournament 2014, Finals -63.5 kg	Langkawi, Malaysia	Decision (Unanimous)	N/A	N/A
Won the I.F.M.A. World Championship Tournament Gold Medal -63.5 kg.
2014-05-?	Win	(Finland) Riikka Järvenpää	I.F.M.A. World Championship Tournament 2014, Semi Finals -63.5 kg	Langkawi, Malaysia	Decision (Unanimous)	N/A	N/A
2014-05-?	Win	(United States) Jennifer Guerrero	I.F.M.A. World Championship Tournament 2014, Quarter Finals -63.5 kg	Langkawi, Malaysia	Decision (Unanimous)	N/A	N/A
2011-09-26	Win	(Sweden) Lina Länsberg	I.F.M.A. World Championship Tournament 2011, Finals -63.5 kg	Tashkent, Uzbekistan	Decision (Unanimous)	N/A	N/A
Won the I.F.M.A. World Championship Tournament Gold Medal -63.5 kg.
2011-09-24	Win	(Russia) Svetlana Usmanova	I.F.M.A. World Championship Tournament 2011, Semi Finals -63.5 kg	Tashkent, Uzbekistan	Decision (Unanimous)	N/A	N/A
2011-09-22	Win	(Morocco) Rachida Hilali	I.F.M.A. World Championship Tournament 2011, Quarter Finals -63.5 kg	Tashkent, Uzbekistan	Decision (Unanimous)	N/A	N/A
2010-08-?	Loss	(Belarus) Alla Ivashkevich	I.F.M.A. World Championship Tournament 2010, Quarter Finals -60 kg	Bangkok, Thailand	Decision	3	3:00
2010-08-?	Win	N/A	I.F.M.A. World Championship Tournament 2010, Eight Finals -60 kg	Bangkok, Thailand	N/A	N/A	N/A
2008-09-?	Loss	(Turkey) N/A	I.F.M.A. World Championship Tournament 2008, Semi Finals -60 kg	Busan, South Korea	N/A	N/A	N/A
Won the I.F.M.A. World Championship Tournament Bronze Medal -60 kg.
2008-09-?	Win	(Russia) Alena Muratova	I.F.M.A. World Championship Tournament 2008, Quarter Finals -60 kg	Busan, South Korea	Decision (Unanimous)	3	3:00
2008-09-?	Win	(South Korea) N/A	I.F.M.A. World Championship Tournament 2008, First Round -60 kg	Busan, South Korea	TKO	N/A	N/A
2007-12-4	Loss	(Thailand) Lamduan Satkum	I.F.M.A. World Championship Tournament 2007, Finals -60 kg	Bangkok, Thailand	Decision	4	2:00
Won the I.F.M.A. World Championship Tournament Silver Medal -60 kg.
2007-11-30	Win	(Finland) Katarina Perkkiö	I.F.M.A. World Championship Tournament 2007, Semi Finals -60 kg	Bangkok, Thailand	Decision (Unanimous)	4	2:00
2007-11-?	Win	N/A	I.F.M.A. World Championship Tournament 2007, Quarter Finals -60 kg	Bangkok, Thailand	KO	1	N/A
2007-?-?	Win	(Russia) N/A	R.M.F. Russian National Championship Tournament 2007, Finals -60 kg	Yekaterinburg, Russia	Decision	3	N/A
Won the R.M.F. Russian National Championship Tournament Gold Medal -60 kg.
2007-?-?	Win	(Belarus) Alla Ivashkevich	I.F.M.A. Cup of Russia	Sochi, Russia	Decision (Unanimous)	N/A	N/A
2003-10-13	Win	(Finland) Katarina Perkkiö	WAKO World Championships	Paris, France	Decision (Unanimous)	3	2:00
2003-09-?	Win	(Australia) Suzanne Miller	I.F.M.A. World Championship Tournament 2003, Finals -60 kg	Almaty, Kazakhstan	Decision (Unanimous)	3	3:00
Won the I.F.M.A. World Championship Tournament Gold Medal -60 kg.
2003-09-?	Win	N/A	I.F.M.A. World Championship Tournament 2003, Semi Finals -60 kg	Almaty, Kazakhstan	N/A	N/A	N/A
2003-09-?	Win	N/A	I.F.M.A. World Championship Tournament 2003, Quarter Finals -60 kg	Almaty, Kazakhstan	N/A	N/A	N/A
Legend: Win Loss Draw/No contest Notes
