= Stefan Janos =

Stefan Janos may refer to:

- Stefan Janos (fighter)
- Stefan Janos (physicist)
