= Luka Strezoski =

Serbian professor & entrepreneur

- Born: Serbia
- Education: Faculty of Technical Sciences (FTN) in University of Novi Sad, Bachelors, Masters and PhD.; City, University of London, Graduate research; Case Western Reserve University, Graduate research
- Occupations: professor of electrical engineering; entrepreneur
- Known for: energy systems research; mixed martial artist

Luka Strezoski is a Serbian professor of electrical engineering and an entrepreneur, known for his contributions to energy systems research. He is also a professional mixed martial artist (MMA), who recently retired from the sport.

== Early life and education ==
Strezoski was born in Serbia. He pursued higher education at the Faculty of Technical Sciences (FTN) in University of Novi Sad, where he completed his Bachelor's, Master's, and Ph.D. degrees with summa cum laude honors. During his graduate studies, he conducted research at the City University of London, UK (6 months) and Case Western Reserve University in Ohio, USA (two years). During his life in the USA, he trained in mixed martial arts alongside UFC heavyweight champion Stipe Miočić.

== Research activity ==
After completing his Ph.D., Strezoski joined the faculty at FTN. His research focuses on integrating renewable energy sources into modern power grids, exploring how large-scale renewable energy production can be harnessed to create efficient and sustainable energy systems.

Strezoski has also worked on technologies for digitizing electric distribution utility control centers, including Advanced Distribution Management Systems (ADMS) and Distributed Energy Resource Management Systems (DERMS). He has published peer-reviewed papers and served as an expert advisor for electric utility companies.

== Entrepreneurship ==
Strezoski founded DerMag Consulting LLC and SMG Electric, companies that advise electric utility companies on deploying Advanced Distribution Management Systems (ADMS) and Distributed Energy Resource Management Systems (DERMS) solutions, as well as developing their own electric grid management solutions. He also founded Reload Energy Drinks.

== MMA career ==
Strezoski has competed in professional MMA bouts and was recognized as a welterweight fighter from Serbia, ranking among the top five in the Balkans and number one in Ohio. He achieved notable victories against Dequan Townsend, Jovan Marjanovic, and Portland Pringle, and experienced a majority decision loss to Michel Pereira.

== Awards and recognition ==
- Received the Dr. Zoran Djindjic Award in 2020 for the best scientist under 35, Autonomous Province of Vojvodina, Serbia.
- Recipient of the Award for Scientific Excellence, Faculty of Technical Sciences, University of Novi Sad, in 2022
- Won multiple state championships in Brazilian Jiu-Jitsu and Luta Livre and
- Holds Luta Livre black belt
- Placed third at the IBJJF European Championship in 2007 in the junior category.
