= Bevon Lewis =

American mixed martial arts fighter

- Born: Bevon Kareem Lewis; May 5, 1991 (age 35); Gardena, California, United States
- Other names: The Extraordinary Gentleman
- Height: 6 ft 3 in (1.91 m)
- Weight: 227 lb (103 kg; 16 st 3 lb)
- Division: Welterweight; Middleweight; Heavyweight
- Reach: 79 in (201 cm)
- Fighting out of: Stone Mountain, Georgia, United States
- Team: Jackson-Wink MMA (2016–2019)
- Years active: 2015–present

Mixed martial arts record
- Total: 15
- Wins: 9
- By knockout: 4
- By decision: 5
- Losses: 6
- By knockout: 4
- By submission: 1
- By decision: 1

Other information
- Mixed martial arts record from Sherdog

Bevon Kareem Lewis (born May 5, 1991) is an American mixed martial artist who competes in the light heavyweight division. A professional since 2015, he has also competed for Professional Fighters League (PFL), Ultimate Fighting Championship (UFC), Legacy Fighting Alliance (LFA) and Xtreme Caged Combat.

== Background ==
Bevon Kareem Lewis was born on May 5, 1991, in Gardena, California. Growing up, he frequently moved and switched schools, which kept him from establishing a steady sports background. He did not participate in organized athletics during his school years.

After graduating from high school, Lewis became interested in mixed martial arts as a way to learn how to fight and defend himself. What began as self-defense training soon developed into a deep passion for the sport, leading him to pursue MMA full-time. Since then, his primary focus has been his fighting career, while also exploring interests outside of competition.

== Mixed martial arts career ==
=== Early career ===
With an amateur record of 12–2, Lewis turned pro in 2015 where he fought most of his early professional fights primarily in the Legacy Fighting Alliance and Xtreme Caged Combat.

Lewis made his first appearances in Dana White's Contender Series 8 web-series program on August 29, 2017, facing Elias Urbina where he won the fight via technical knockout and signed to a development league contract.

After a win over Collin Huckbody on April 27, 2018 at LFA 38 via a unanimous decision, Lewis made his second appearance in Dana White's Contender Series 12 where faced Alton Cunningham on July 10, 2018 and won the fight via a technical knockout out in round one and was awarded a contract with UFC.

=== Ultimate Fighting Championship ===
Lewis made his UFC debut on December 29, 2018 against Uriah Hall at UFC 232. He lost the fight via knockout in the third round.

His next fight came on June 8, 2018 at UFC 238 against Darren Stewart. He lost the fight by unanimous decision.

Lewis was scheduled to face Alen Amedovski on May 28, 2020 at UFC Fight Night: Blaydes vs. dos Santos. However, Amedovski was forced pulled out of the event citing injury and was replaced by Dequan Townsend. Lewis won the fight via unanimous decision.

Lewis faced Trevin Giles on November 7, 2020 at UFC on ESPN: Santos vs. Teixeira. He lost the fight via technical knockout.

The UFC announced Lewis's release from the promotion on November 13, 2020.

=== Post-UFC career ===
Lewis headlined PFL Challenger Series 6 in a heavyweight bout against Marcelo Nunes on March 25, 2022. He lost the bout via arm-triangle choke in the second round.

Lewis made his Light Heavyweight debut against Ozzy Diaz on May 17, 2024 in the Main Event of LFA 184. He lost the fight via TKO in the second round.

Synergy FC 16 on November 16, 2024: Lewis faced Julius “Juice Box” Walker for the Synergy FC Light Heavyweight Championship. He lost the bout via TKO (punches) in the first round at 3:30.

LFA 214 on August 15, 2025: Lewis faced Devin “Brown Bear” Clark at the Sanford Pentagon in Sioux Falls, South Dakota. He won via split decision, with judges scoring the bout 29–28, 28–29, and 29–28, improving his professional record to 8–6.

== Personal life ==
Outside of mixed martial arts, Lewis has expressed a passion for drawing, often using art as a creative outlet apart from training and competition. He also values giving back to others and has a strong interest in working with and supporting children, which he views as an important part of his life beyond fighting.

In addition to his athletic career, Lewis is an entrepreneur. Together with his brother, he co-founded AASPEC.

His moniker "The Extraordinary Gentleman" was coined by MMA pioneer Pat Miletich.

== Mixed martial arts record ==
Professional record breakdown
15 matches	9 wins	6 losses
By knockout	4	4
By submission	0	1
By decision	5	1

Res.	Record	Opponent	Method	Event	Date	Round	Time	Location	Notes
Win	9–6	Jackson Stanford	TKO (punches)	Cage Fury FC 156	June 26, 2026	1	4:06	Rockford, Illinois, United States	Won the interim Cage Fury FC Heavyweight Championship.
Win	8–6	Devin Clark	Decision (split)	LFA 214	August 15, 2025	3	5:00	Sioux Falls, South Dakota, United States	Return to Heavyweight.
Loss	7–6	Julius Walker	TKO (punches)	Synergy FC 16	November 16, 2024	1	3:30	Springfield, Missouri, United States	For the Synergy FC Light Heavyweight Championship.
Loss	7–5	Ozzy Diaz	TKO (punches)	LFA 184	May 17, 2024	2	3:24	Commerce, California, United States	Light Heavyweight debut.
Loss	7–4	Marcelo Nunes	Submission (arm-triangle choke)	PFL Challenger Series 6	March 25, 2022	2	2:39	Orlando, Florida, United States	Heavyweight debut.
Loss	7–3	Trevin Giles	TKO (punches)	UFC on ESPN: Santos vs. Teixeira	November 7, 2020	3	1:26	Las Vegas, Nevada, United States	
Win	7–2	Dequan Townsend	Decision (unanimous)	UFC Fight Night: Blaydes vs. dos Santos	January 25, 2020	3	5:00	Raleigh, North Carolina, United States	
Loss	6–2	Darren Stewart	Decision (unanimous)	UFC 238	June 8, 2019	3	5:00	Chicago, Illinois, United States	
Loss	6–1	Uriah Hall	KO (punch)	UFC 232	December 29, 2018	3	1:32	Inglewood, California, United States	
Win	6–0	Alton Cunningham	TKO (knees)	Dana White's Contender Series 12	July 27, 2018	1	3:01	Las Vegas, United States	
Win	5–0	Collin Huckbody	Decision (unanimous)	LFA 38	April 27, 2018	3	5:00	Minneapolis, Minnesota, United States	
Win	4–0	Elias Urbina	KO (punches)	Dana White's Contender Series 8	August 29, 2017	2	2:47	Las Vegas, United States	
Win	3–0	Sonny Yohn	Decision (unanimous)	LFA 10	April 21, 2017	3	5:00	Pueblo, Colorado, United States	
Win	2–0	Kristopher Gratalo	KO (punches)	Xtreme Caged Combat 24	April 30, 2016	3	0:52	Bethlehem, Pennsylvania, United States	Middleweight debut.
Win	1–0	Aaron Aschendorf	Decision (unanimous)	House of Fame 4	October 29, 2015	3	5:00	Jacksonville, Florida, United States	Welterweight debut.

== See also ==
- List of male mixed martial artists
