= Jewels 5th Ring =

Mixed martial arts event in 2009

- The poster for Jewels 5th Ring
- Promotion: Jewels
- Date: September 13, 2009
- Venue: Shinjuku Face
- City: Kabukicho, Tokyo, Japan
- Attendance: 610

Event chronology
Jewels 4th Ring	Jewels 5th Ring	Jewels 6th Ring

Jewels 5th Ring was a mixed martial arts (MMA) event held by MMA promotion Jewels. The event took place on September 13, 2009 at Shinjuku Face in Kabukicho, Tokyo, Japan.

== Background ==
Jewels announced on August 5, 2009 that Jewels 5th Ring would take place at Shinjuku Face, headlining South Korean fighter and Deep veteran Seo Hee Ham against Misaki Takimoto and with the first Rough Stone Grand Prix tournament with three weight classes. On August 26, 2009, Jewels added former Smackgirl champion Megumi Yabushita and German fighter Alexandra Sanchez to the card. Kikuyo Ishikawa was originally set to face Mami Odera as part of Rough Stone GP, but Odera got injured and Ishikawa participated in a normal bout instead of the tournament.

== Results ==
Main Card
Weight class				Method	Round	Time	Notes
-49 kg	Seo Hee Ham	def.	Misaki Takimoto	Decision (Unanimous)	2	5:00	(Note: Ham was penalized with a yellow card at the beginning of the fight for being 0.4 kilograms (0.88 lb) above the limit agreed. Ham used her Muay Thai to keep Takimoto on the defensive. Takimoto responded with her karate, but Ham was the more effective striker. By the second round, Ham's strikes had weakened Takimoto and around the middle of the round, Ham connected a punching combination near a corner that resulted in a standing count for Takimoto. Takimoto tried two unsuccessful takedown attempts and once again was dropped with more punches. Ham took the unanimous decision.)
Openweight	Megumi Yabushita	def.	Atsuko Emoto	Submission (Armbar)	1	2:43	(Note: Emoto reversed shoulder throw, taking Yabushita's back, but Yabushita was able to free himself and got on top. After being stand up, Yabushita tried once again the shoulder throw, successfully this time, and followed it with an armbar that gave her the victory.)
-60 kg	Alexandra Buch	def.	Shizuka Sugiyama	Decision (Unanimous)	2	5:00	(Note: Sugiyama was unable to take Sanchez down, as Sanchez effectively used her height and reach advantage to land strikes. These continued through the second round, with Sanches dropping Sugiyama down for a standing count, which Sugiyama resisted but still was unable to do something to avoid the unanimous decision victory for Sanchez.)
-60 kg	Tomoko Morii	def.	Chihiro Oikawa	Submission (Armbar)	1	4:13	(Note: Oikawa attacked Morri with wild punches and both fighters went to clinch. Oikawa pulled guard when Morii pushed her from the clinch and, eventually, Morii passed Oikawa guard and ended the fight with an armbar.)
-54 kg	Mika Nagano	def.	Rina Tomita	Technical Submission (Armbar)	1	2:25	(Note: Nagano quickly took control of the fight by scoring a takedown. She transitioned to the mount. Tomita tried to defend but Nagano secured an armbar. Tomita struggled to try to get out but the referee opted for stopping the fight before Tomita's arm got injured.)
-54 kg	Yoko Kagoshima	def.	Yuko Oya	Decision (Unanimous)	2	5:00	(Note: Kagoshima connected Oya with punches and avoided two takedown attempts. Oya managed to take Kagoshima down and tried an armbar but Kogashima defended and got back on her feet. In round two, Kagoshima dominated the fight, punching and kneeing Oya and avoiding her takedown attempts. Oya was able to free herself from a guillotine choke, but Kogashima won the fight by decision.)
-48 kg	Asami Kodera	def.	Misaki Ozawa	Submission (Triangle Armbar)	2	1:56	(Note: Round one consisted of punching exchanges between the two fighters. Kodera tried to get an armbar towards the end of the round but was unable to do it. Kodera punched Ozawa during the beginning of the second round, and tried a takedown which Ozawa reversed but also fell into a triangle and, since Ozawa was holding up, Kodera applied an armbar which forced Ozawa to submit.)
-52 kg	Kikuyo Ishikawa	def.	Asako Saioka	Submission (Rear-Naked Choke)	1	1:18	(Note: Ishikawa countered Saioka's punching attack and clinched, and then she took Saioka's back, getting the rear naked choke within seconds.)
Jewels Grappling Rules
-56 kg	Masami Tsujiyama	vs.	Miki "Planet"	Draw (timeout)	1	4:00
-56 kg	Ayaka Hamasaki	def.	Hikaru Shida	Submission (armlock)	1	0:38

== See also ==
- Jewels (mixed martial arts)
- 2009 in Jewels
