= Dequan Townsend =

American mixed martial arts fighter

- Born: May 11, 1986 (age 40); Lansing, Michigan, U.S.
- Other names: The Tarantula
- Height: 6 ft 3 in (1.91 m)
- Weight: 205 lb (93 kg; 14 st 9 lb)
- Division: Heavyweight; Light Heavyweight; Middleweight; Welterweight
- Reach: 76 in (193 cm)
- Team: Murcielago MMA (until 2020); Team Elevation (2020–present)
- Years active: 2012–present

Mixed martial arts record
- Total: 40
- Wins: 27
- By knockout: 15
- By submission: 5
- By decision: 7
- Losses: 13
- By knockout: 2
- By submission: 1
- By decision: 10

Other information
- Mixed martial arts record from Sherdog

Dequan Townsend (born May 11, 1986) is an American mixed martial artist currently competing in the Light Heavyweight division. He has previously fought for the Ultimate Fighting Championship (UFC).

== Background ==
Townsend originally began training cardio kickboxing along with powerlifting before transitioning to mixed martial arts in 2009.

== Mixed martial arts career ==
=== Early career ===
After an 8–4 amateur career, Townsend compiled a professional mixed martial arts record of 21–8. Townsend later signed with the UFC in June 2019.

=== Ultimate Fighting Championship ===
Townsend made his UFC debut at light heavyweight on June 29, 2019 as a late-notice opponent against Dalcha Lungiambula at UFC on ESPN: Ngannou vs. dos Santos. He lost the fight via TKO with punches and elbows in round three.

Townsend tested positive for benzoylecgonine, a metabolite of cocaine, and norfentanyl, a metabolite of fentanyl and its derivatives, as the result of an in-competition urine sample he provided on June 28, 2019 at UFC Fight Night Minneapolis. He was suspended 6 months by USADA.

Townsend moved to middleweight and faced Bevon Lewis on January 25, 2020 at UFC Fight Night: Blaydes vs. dos Santos. He lost the fight via unanimous decision.

Townsend returned to light heavyweight and faced Devin Clark on February 15, 2020 at UFC Fight Night: Anderson vs. Błachowicz 2. He lost the fight via unanimous decision.

Townsend faced Duško Todorović on October 4, 2020 at UFC on ESPN: Holm vs. Aldana. He lost the fight via technical knockout in round two.

On October 7, 2020 it was reported Townsend was released by UFC.

=== Post UFC ===
In his first bout since his release from the UFC, Townsend faced Portland Pringle III for the TWC Middleweight Championship at Total Warrior Combat: Unfinished Business on February 5, 2022. He won the bout and title via unanimous decision.

Townsend faced Jason Butcher on April 2, 2022 at B2 Fighting Series 154 for the B2FS Light Heavyweight Championship. He won the bout and title via unanimous decision.

Townsend faced Daniel Spohn on October 8, 2022 at Ohio Combat League 22. He lost the bout via unanimous decision.

== Personal life ==
Townsend had four sons. – Malakye – died of cancer in March 2015. His eldest Casharie was killed November 2023 Townsend is also a registered nurse, working in home health care area full-time.

Townsend had two brothers, Steven and Marcus, who both were killed in a strip mall shooting in Lansing, Michigan in August 2020.

== Championships and accomplishments ==
- Warrior Xtreme Cagefighting
  - WXC Middleweight Championship (Two-time)
  - WXC Welterweight Championship (One time)
- Total Warrior Combat
  - TWC Light Heavyweight Championship (One time)
  - TWC Middleweight Championship (Two time)
  - TWC Welterweight Championship (Two time)
    - Two successful title defenses
- B2 Fighting Series
  - B2FS Light Heavyweight Championship (One time)

== Mixed martial arts record ==
Professional record breakdown
40 matches	27 wins	13 losses
By knockout	15	2
By submission	5	1
By decision	7	10

Res.	Record	Opponent	Method	Event	Date	Round	Time	Location	Notes
Win	27–13	Matthew Comer	TKO (elbows and punches)	Rebel Combat Sports: Caldwell vs. Lozano	November 9, 2024	2	1:00	Lansing, Michigan, United States	
Win	26–13	Chris Hicks	Decision (unanimous)	Rebel Combat Sports: Townsend vs. Hicks	February 17, 2024	3	5:00	Lansing, Michigan, United States	Return to Light Heavyweight. Won the vacant RCS Light Heavyweight Championship.
Win	25–13	Marcus Maulding	TKO (punches)	Rebel Combat Sports 1	October 28, 2023	1	4:33	Lansing, Michigan, United States	
Win	24–13	Eric Smith	TKO (punches)	Total Warrior Combat 101.5	May 26, 2023	1	3:51	Lansing, Michigan, United States	Heavyweight debut.
Loss	23–13	Dan Spohn	Decision (unanimous)	Ohio Combat League 22	October 8, 2022	3	5:00	Columbus, Ohio, United States	
Win	23–12	Jason Butcher	Decision (unanimous)	B2 Fighting Series 154	April 2, 2022	5	5:00	Novi, Michigan, United States	Return to Light Heavyweight; Won the B2FS Light Heavyweight Championship.
Win	22–12	Portland Pringle III	Decision (unanimous)	Total Warrior Combat: Unfinished Business	February 5, 2022	3	5:00	Lansing, Michigan, United States	Won the vacant TWC Middleweight Championship.
Loss	21–12	Duško Todorović	TKO (punches)	UFC on ESPN: Holm vs. Aldana	October 4, 2020	2	3:15	Abu Dhabi, United Arab Emirates	
Loss	21–11	Devin Clark	Decision (unanimous)	UFC Fight Night: Anderson vs. Błachowicz 2	February 15, 2020	3	5:00	Rio Rancho, New Mexico, United States	Light Heavyweight bout.
Loss	21–10	Bevon Lewis	Decision (unanimous)	UFC Fight Night: Blaydes vs. dos Santos	January 25, 2020	3	5:00	Raleigh, North Carolina, United States	Return to Middleweight.
Loss	21–9	Dalcha Lungiambula	TKO (punches and elbows)	UFC on ESPN: Ngannou vs. dos Santos	June 29, 2019	3	0:42	Minneapolis, Minnesota, United States	
Win	21–8	Wayman Carter	Submission (guillotine choke)	Total Warrior Combat: Brooks vs. Robinson	March 9, 2019	1	1:31	Lansing, Michigan, United States	Won the TWC Light Heavyweight Championship.
Win	20–8	Portland Pringle III	Decision (split)	Total Warrior Combat: Bennett vs. Shaw	December 1, 2018	3	5:00	Lansing, Michigan, United States	
Loss	19–8	Jamahal Hill	Decision (unanimous)	KnockOut Promotions 62	June 30, 2018	5	5:00	Grand Rapids, Michigan, United States	Light Heavyweight debut. For the KOP Light Heavyweight Championship.
Win	19–7	Muhammad Abdullah	Submission (guillotine choke)	WXC 71	February 17, 2018	3	3:58	Southgate, Michigan, United States	Won the WXC Middleweight Championship.
Win	18–7	Héctor Urbina	KO (head kick)	New League Fights 7	October 28, 2017	1	1:16	Montpelier, Ohio, United States	
Win	17–7	Willis Black	TKO (head kick and punches)	WXC 69	July 14, 2017	1	0:28	Southgate, Michigan, United States	
Win	16–7	Timothy Woods	Decision (unanimous)	Fighters Supporting Fighters MMA: New Beginning	May 20, 2017	3	5:00	Birch Run, Michigan, United States	Return to Middleweight.
Loss	15–7	Luka Strezoski	Submission (heel hook)	Revelation Fight Organization: Big Guns 23	March 25, 2017	1	1:42	Cleveland, Ohio, United States	
Loss	15–6	Jason Fischer	Decision (unanimous)	WXC 66	January 13, 2017	5	5:00	Southgate, Michigan, United States	For the WXC Welterweight Championship.
Win	15–5	Ted Worthington	TKO (punches)	TWC Pro Series: Anderson vs. Veerella	November 12, 2016	1	1:24	Lansing, Michigan, United States	
Loss	14–5	Dakota Cochrane	Decision (split)	Total Warrior Combat 29	May 14, 2016	5	5:00	Lansing, Michigan, United States	Lost the TWC Welterweight Championship.
Loss	14–4	Kevin Nowaczyk	Decision (unanimous)	Hoosier Fight Club 27	February 6, 2016	5	5:00	Michigan City, Indiana, United States	For the Hoosier FC Welterweight Championship.
Win	14–3	Erick Lozano	Submission (triangle choke)	Total Warrior Combat 28	November 21, 2015	2	2:51	Lansing, Michigan, United States	Defended the TWC Welterweight Championship.
Win	13–3	Dustin Pape	Submission (triangle choke)	Duneland Classic 9	October 30, 2015	2	4:22	Laporte, Indiana, United States	
Win	12–3	Tenyeh Dixon	TKO (punches)	WXC 59	August 8, 2015	3	0:18	Taylor, Michigan, United States	Won the WXC Welterweight Championship.
Win	11–3	Deray Davis	Decision (unanimous)	Michiana Fight League 38	July 11, 2015	3	5:00	South Bend, Indiana, United States	Middleweight bout.
Win	10–3	Josh Taveirne	TKO (doctor stoppage)	Total Warrior Combat 27	June 20, 2015	3	3:40	Lansing, Michigan, United States	Defended the TWC Welterweight Championship.
Win	9–3	Dom O'Grady	TKO (punches)	WXC 55	February 7, 2015	1	4:58	Southgate, Michigan, United States	
Win	8–3	Billy Ward	TKO (punches)	Total Warrior Combat 26	November 22, 2014	1	2:19	Lansing, Michigan, United States	Won the vacant TWC Welterweight Championship.
Loss	7–3	David Evans	Decision (unanimous)	WXC 52	August 15, 2014	5	5:00	Southgate, Michigan, United States	For the vacant WXC Welterweight Championship.
Win	7–2	Darryl Madison	Submission (rear-naked choke)	Michiana Fight League 34	May 17, 2014	2	2:30	South Bend, Indiana, United States	Catchweight (175 lb) bout.
Win	6–2	Marcus Reynolds	KO (kick to body)	XFC 27	December 13, 2013	3	2:52	Muskegon, Michigan, United States	Catchweight (180 lb) bout.
Win	5–2	Erick Lozano	KO (punches)	Total Warrior Combat 20	November 16, 2013	1	2:33	Lansing, Michigan, United States	Won the TWC Welterweight Championship.
Loss	4–2	Rocky Johnson	Decision (unanimous)	Sparta Combat League: Havoc at the Hellespont	September 27, 2013	3	5:00	Loveland, Colorado, United States	Catchweight (175 lb) bout.
Win	4–1	Anthony Smith	TKO (punches)	Total Warrior Combat 18	May 18, 2013	1	3:28	Lansing, Michigan, United States	Middleweight debut. Won the TWC Middleweight Championship.
Win	3–1	Canaan Grigsby	KO (punches)	Sparta Combat League: Thunderdome	February 9, 2013	1	0:07	Denver, Colorado, United States	
Win	2–1	Robby Longwith	TKO (punches)	Total Warrior Combat 14	September 22, 2012	1	0:27	Lansing, Michigan, United States	
Loss	1–1	Jason Cardillo	Decision (unanimous)	North American Allied Fight Series: Caged Fury 17	April 27, 2012	3	5:00	Morgantown, West Virginia, United States	
Win	1–0	Andy Hahn	Decision (split)	Impact Fight League 45	February 18, 2012	3	5:00	Auburn Hills, Michigan, United States	Welterweight debut.

== See also ==
- List of male mixed martial artists
