= Respect Fighting Championship =

Mixed martial arts organization in Germany

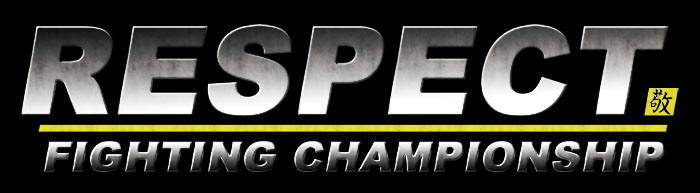
- Type: Private
- Industry: Mixed Martial Arts promotion
- Founded: 2009
- Headquarters: Hessen, Germany
- Key people: Sven Neumann, Liam Conway

Respect Fighting Championship (RESPECT.FC) is a mixed martial arts organization in Germany. It has won the GNP Award for the best German promotion in 2009, 2010 and 2011 Especially noteworthy in this context is that RESPECT.FC has beaten the Ultimate Fighting Championship (the biggest mixed martial arts organization in the world), who was nominated with their first German based event UFC 99. The events are broadcast by Fightcast.tv.

== History ==
=== Partnership with Battle of the South (Netherlands) ===
On April 2, 2011, a 'RESPECT.FC Title Contender Fight' between Ben Boekee and Denis Oliwka took place at "Battle of the South", one of the biggest MMA Events in the Netherlands. That was the first and only co-promotion for RESPECT.FC so far.

== Rules ==
RESPECT.FC's rules differ somewhat from the North American Unified Rules. Among the differences are the allowance of knees to the head of downed opponent and stomp kicks to the body, while elbows to the head of downed opponent and soccer kicks are prohibited. Similar to the Unified Rules, fights have 3 rounds each lasting 5 minutes. Title Fights are 5 rounds.

== Current champions ==
Division	Upper weight limit	Champion	Since	Defenses
Heavyweight	120 kg (264.6 lb; 18.9 st)	(Germany) Björn Schmiedeberg	11. September 2010 (RESPECT.4)	1
Cruiserweight	93 kg (205.0 lb; 14.6 st)	(Germany) Stephan Puetz	13. April 2013 (RESPECT.9)	0
Middleweight	84 kg (185.2 lb; 13.2 st)	(Poland) Marcin Naruszczka	13. April, 2013 (RESPECT.9)	0
Welterweight	77 kg (169.8 lb; 12.1 st)	(Germany) Ruben Crawford	21. April 2012 (RESPECT.7)	0
Lightweight	70 kg (154.3 lb; 11.0 st)	(Germany) Cengiz Dana	17. September 2011 (RESPECT.6)	1
Featherweight	65 kg (143.3 lb; 10.2 st)	(Netherlands) Ben Boekee	17. September 2011 (RESPECT.6)	0

== Championship history ==
=== Heavyweight Championship ===
No.	Name	Event	Date	Defenses
1	(Germany) Björn Schmiedeberg def. Andreas Kraniotakes	RESPECT.4; Sportpark, Herne, Germany	September 11, 2010	1. def. Sascha Weinpolter at RESPECT.6 on Sep 17, 2011 in Wuppertal, Germany

=== Cruiserweight Championship ===
No.	Name	Event	Date	Defenses
1	(Poland) Marcin Naruszczka def. Manuel Masuch	RESPECT.6; Bayer Hall, Wuppertal, Germany	September 17, 2011	1. def. Mario Stapel at RESPECT.7 on Apr 21, 2012 in Essen, Germany
Title vacated after Naruszczka moved down to middleweight.

=== Middleweight Championship ===
No.	Name	Event	Date	Defenses
1	(Germany) Sebastian Risch def. Nick Hein	RESPECT.6; Bayer Hall, Wuppertal, Germany	September 17, 2011	
2	(Germany) Nicolas Penzer	RESPECT.7; Eishalle, Essen, Germany	April 21, 2012	
3	(Poland) Marcin Naruszczka	RESPECT.9; Bayer Sportscenter, Dormagen, Germany	April 13, 2013	

=== Welterweight Championship ===
No.	Name	Event	Date	Defenses
1	(Germany) Ruben Crawford def. Steve Mensing	RESPECT.7; Eishalle, Essen, Germany	April 21, 2012	

=== Lightweight Championship ===
No.	Name	Event	Date	Defenses
1	(Germany) Cengiz Dana def. Niko Lohmann	RESPECT.6; Bayer Hall, Wuppertal, Germany	September 17, 2011	1. def. Adam Golonkiewicz at RESPECT.7 on Apr 21, 2012 in Essen, Germany

=== Featherweight Championship ===
No.	Name	Event	Date	Defenses
1	(Netherlands) Ben Boekee def. Marcel Jedidi	RESPECT.6; Bayer Hall, Wuppertal, Germany	September 17, 2011	

== Notable fighters ==
- (Germany) Björn Schmiedeberg - #1 ranked German HW fighter, RESPECT.FC Heavyweight Champion
- (Netherlands) Ben Boekee - WFCA Dutch Featherweight Champion, RESPECT.FC Featherweight Champion
- (Germany) Cengiz Dana - M-1 Global, KSW and Cage Warriors veteran, RESPECT.FC Lightweight Champion
- Sascha Weinpolter - #1 ranked Austrian HW fighter, Austria MMA Heavyweight Champion
- (Germany) Andreas Kraniotakes - #3 ranked German HW fighter, Cage Warriors veteran, appears as a character in EA Sports MMA video game
- (Netherlands) Danny Hoyer - IKF Sanshou Super-Welterweight World Champion
- (Germany) Janosch Stefan - 2nd Place Combat Sambo World Championships 2008
- (Germany) Nordin Asrih - TUF Season 13 contestant and M-1 Global veteran
- (Germany) Alexandra Sanchez - Jewels Rough Stone Grand Prix 2009 Champion
- (Netherlands) Raymond Jarman - M-1 Global & Shooto veteran
- (Germany) Nick Hein - European Judo Champion 2006
- (Germany) Jesse-Björn Buckler - Cage Warriors and SLAMM!! Events veteran

== Events ==
Event	Date	City	Venue
RESPECT FC 1	March 14, 2009	(Germany) Herne	Fighters World Herne
RESPECT FC 2	November 7, 2009	(Germany) Herne	Sportpark Herne
RESPECT FC 3	April 24, 2010	(Germany) Essen	Sporthalle Bergeborbeck
RESPECT FC 4	September 11, 2010	(Germany) Herne	Sportpark Herne
RESPECT FC 5	April 9, 2011	(Germany) Essen	Zeche Amalie
RESPECT FC 6 "Stronger than ever"	September 17, 2011	(Germany) Wuppertal	Bayerhalle Wuppertal
RESPECT FC 7	April 21, 2012	(Germany) Essen	Eishalle Essen
RESPECT FC 8	September 22, 2012	(Germany) Wuppertal	Bayerhalle Wuppertal
RESPECT FC 9	April 13, 2013	(Germany) Dormagen	Bayer Sport Center
RESPECT FC 10	September 28, 2013	(Germany) Wuppertal	Bayerhalle Wuppertal
RESPECT FC 11	April 5, 2014	(Germany) Dormagen	Bayer Sport Center
RESPECT FC 12	April 11, 2015	(Germany) Wuppertal	Bayer Sportpark
RESPECT FC 13	July 18, 2015	(Germany) Karlsruhe	Rintheimer Halle
RESPECT FC 14	September 19, 2015	(Germany) Karlsruhe	Rheinstrandhalle
RESPECT FC 15	March 12, 2016	(Germany) Karlsruhe	Rintheimer Halle
RESPECT FC 16	April 9, 2016	(Germany) Cologne	FIBO (trade show)
RESPECT FC 17	September 17, 2016	(Germany) Karlsruhe	Rheinstrandhalle
RESPECT FC 18	December 4, 2016	(Germany) Cologne	Sartory-Säle
RESPECT FC 19	September 21, 2019	(Germany) Limburg an der Lahn	Alte Markthalle
RESPECT FC: AMATEUR CHAMPIONSHIPS 6	November 9, 2019	(Germany) Idstein	Limeshalle
RESPECT FC 20	September 26, 2020	(Germany) Hanover	Star Event Center
