= Jewels 6th Ring =

Mixed martial arts event in 2009

- The poster for Jewels 6th Ring
- Promotion: Jewels
- Date: December 11, 2009
- Venue: Shinjuku Face
- City: Kabukicho, Tokyo, Japan
- Attendance: 762

Event chronology
Jewels 5th Ring	Jewels 6th Ring	Jewels 7th Ring

Jewels 6th Ring was a mixed martial arts (MMA) event held by MMA promotion Jewels. It took place on December 11, 2009 at Shinjuku Face in Kabukicho, Tokyo, Japan.

== Background ==
The event featured the Rough stone grand prix tournament finals, in which Asami Kodera, Mika Nagano and Alexandra Sanchez became the first Jewels champions. The first fights and participants besides the Rough stone GP card were announced in October 2009. On November 9, 2009, Saori Ishioka and Sally Krumdiack along with two more fights were added to the event. Mari Kaneko was added to the card and it was announced that the event was sold out on November 30, 2009. The fight order announcement and weigh-ins were done on December 10, 2009. Hisae Watanabe was expected to make her return to MMA in this event, but suffered a broken foot during training and was unable to participate.

== Results ==
Main Card
Weight class				Method	Round	Time	Notes
-52.5 kg	Saori Ishioka	def.	Sally Krumdiack	Technical Submission (Armbar)	1	2:45	(Note: In a controversial decision, after Ishioka got Krumdiack with a weak armbar. The referee asked Krumdiack if she was okay, to which Krumdiack responded with her that she was. But the referee mistook the answer and incorrectly stopped the fight. Ringside official immediately recognized the error and it was expected that the fight would be ruled a no contest, but, so far, the result still stands as a victory for Ishioka.)
–48 kg	Asami Kodera	def.	Kikuyo Ishikawa	Decision (Unanimous)	2	5:00	(Note: In a competitive bout, Kodera outmatched Ishikawa on the ground, which gave her the unanimous decision.)
–54 kg	Mika Nagano	def.	Yoko Kagoshima	Submission (Armbar)	2	3:56	(Note: Despite launching some strikes, Kagoshima was unable to have a significant offense on Nagano, who dominated both rounds and tried several submissions before finally getting an armbar.)
–60 kg	Alexandra Buch	def.	Tomoko Morii	Submission (Armbar)	1	3:39	(Note: Sanchez overwhelmed Morii with strikes and was able to submit Morii with her first armbar attempt.)
-60 kg	Shizuka Sugiyama	def.	Yukiko Ozeki	Decision (Unanimous)	2	5:00	(Note: Sugiyama attempted several submissions through the fight, with Ozeki being able to defend without mounting an offense.)
-53.5 kg	Mari Kaneko	def.	Rina Tomita	Decision (Unanimous)	2	5:00	(Note: Despite a four-year absence, Kaneko dominated Tomita the whole fight with Tomita trying ineffectively submission attempts and Kaneko connecting knees and punches.)
-48 kg	Misaki Ozawa	def.	Yumiko Inoue	Decision (Unanimous)	2	5:00	(Note: Ozawa got her first professional victory in a match that Inoue started dominating but could not keep up the pace. Ozawa took the offense and was dominating the fight by the second round.)
-48 kg	Yoko Yamada	def.	Miyoko Kusaka	Decision (Unanimous)	2	5:00	(Note: Although Kusaka was making her MMA debut, she managed to make Yamada go to a decision, the first time in Yamada's career, but Yamada still won the unanimous decision.)
Shoot Boxing Rules
-52 kg	Syuri Kondo	def.	Asako Saioka	Decision (3-0)			(Note: Asako dominated most of the first round, but Kondo responded and controlled the other two, and the pro-wrestler went on to win on her kickboxing debut.)

== See also ==
- Jewels (mixed martial arts)
- 2009 in Jewels
