= Jewels 4th Ring =

Mixed martial arts event in 2009

- The poster for Jewels 4th Ring
- Promotion: Jewels
- Date: July 11, 2009
- Venue: Shin-Kiba 1st Ring
- City: Koto, Tokyo, Japan
- Attendance: 464

Event chronology
Jewels 3rd Ring	Jewels 4th Ring	Jewels 5th Ring

Jewels 4th Ring was a mixed martial arts (MMA) event hosted by promotion Jewels. The event took place on July 11, 2009 at Shin-Kiba 1st Ring in Koto, Tokyo, Japan.

== Background ==
On June 3, 2009, Jewels held a press conference in which president Yuichi Ozono announced the bout between Megumi Fujii and Saori Ishioka for the show to be held at Shin-Kiba 1st Ring on June 11, 2009, in a match that would allow ground and pound with three five-minute rounds, the first match with full MMA rules held in Jewels. Hitomi Akano was added to the card later on, along with three other matches and a few days after that, two more matches were added. The show attracted enough attention that tickets were sold out almost a week before the event. The final order of the card was announced three days before the event. The event was kickboxer Rena Kubota's debut with Jewels in a shoot boxing match.

== Results ==
Main Card
Weight class				Method	Round	Time	Notes
-52 kg	Megumi Fujii	def.	Saori Ishioka	Submission (Armbar)	2	4:17	(Note: Fujii attempted several takedowns which Ishioka defended. Trading punches and kicks while on the clinch, Fujii swept Ishioka's leg scoring a knockdown, which prompted the referee to apply the count. Afterwards, Fujii got a takedown and punched Ishioka in the face to get the mount and started to pound Ishioka's head. Ishioka was able to escape after Fujii attempted an armbar. With the top position, Ishioka connected some punches until Fujii kicked her away and took the top position once again, ending the round with more ground-and-pound. In the second round, Ishioka once again defended the takedown attempts from Fujii and was able to connect some punches and kicks. Fujii counterattacked with left crosses and inside leg kicks, until she took Ishioka down and punched her to get the mount. Ishioka was able to prevent Fujii from punching her from the mount, which prompted Fujii to change tactics and applied an armbar which forced Ishioka to submit.)
-60 kg	Hitomi Akano	def.	Miki Morifuji	Technical Submission (Straight Armbar)	2	4:17	(Note: After a slow start, Akano got a takedown and tried to get a submission, but Morifuji was able to escape most of them until she got caught in an achilles lock. Morifuji punched Akano in the face while on the ground, an action forbidden in the rules of the match, which forced the referee to stand both fighters up after which both fighters traded strikes unsuccessfully. In round two, Akano was able to counter Morifuji's strikes with an attempted guillotine choke from which Morifuji was able to escape only to get caught in a triangle choke from which she had to defend as well. Akano took the mount and was able to submit Morifuji with a straight armbar.)
-54 kg	Mika Nagano	def.	Rina Tomita	Submission (Armbar)	2	0:35	(Note: In the first round, Tomita took the initiative and took the fight to the ground, attempting a triangle choke first and then an armbar, with Nagano being able to escape from both attempts. As Nagano tried to get Tomita's back, both fighters scrambled and fell out of the ring. After the fight resumed, Nagano took Tomita down and punched her on the body, which allowed Nagano to take the mounted position from which she almost defeated Tomita at the end of round one. In the second round, Nagano countered a takedown from Tomita with an armbar, forcing Tomita to submit.)
-64 kg	Shizuka Sugiyama	def.	Mika Harigai	Decision (Unanimous)	2	5:00	(Note: Sugiyama opened the round throwing several series of punches on Harigai, who was able to land some counter punches and kicks. The fight went to the ground briefly and, once the referee stood both fighters up, they continued with the striking, having Sugiyama the advantage. Round two had more of the same action seen in the first round, with a takedown by Sugiyama. Harigai was able to withstand Sugiyama's offense, but Sugiyama still got the unanimous decision.)
-50 kg	Asami Kodera	def.	Yukiko Seki	Submission (Armbar)	1	4:47	(Note: Working in the corners, Kodera landed knees on the ribs of Seki on several occasions, until Kodera tried to get an armbar. Seki defended and got back up and started attacking Kodera with punches. After and exchange of strikes, Kodera tried another armbar which this time was successful.)
-56 kg	Mutsumi Kasai	def.	Celine Haga	Submission (Kimura)	1	3:06	(Note: Kasai attacked Haga with looping hooks and straight punches, which dropped Haga. After standing before the count ran out, Haga was taken down by Kasai, who worked from the top and got a kimura with which she won the bout.)
-60 kg	Hiroko Kitamura	def.	Harumi Harumi	Submission (Triangle Choke)	1	3:51	(Note: The fight started with a striking exchange in which Kitamura dominated Harumi. After the strikes, Kitamura took Harumi down and tried to get a rear naked choke, which Harumi defended, but Kitamura applied a triangle choke that ended the fight.)
-54 kg	Ayaka Hamasaki	def.	Miyoko Kusaka	Technical Submission (Armbar)	1	1:07
-54 kg	Emi Murata	def.	Yoko Kagoshima	TKO (Punches)	1	0:53
Shoot boxing rules
-50 kg	Rena Kubota	def.	Tomoko SP	decision (3-0)			(Note: From the start Kubota took the offense and threw a right straight followed by two headlock throws. Rena kept up the offense, overwhelming Tomoko SP during the whole fight, which ended with a clear unanimous decision victory for Rena (30-26, 30-27, 30-26).)

== See also ==
- Jewels (mixed martial arts)
- 2009 in Jewels
