= Lina Länsberg =

Swedish mixed martial artist

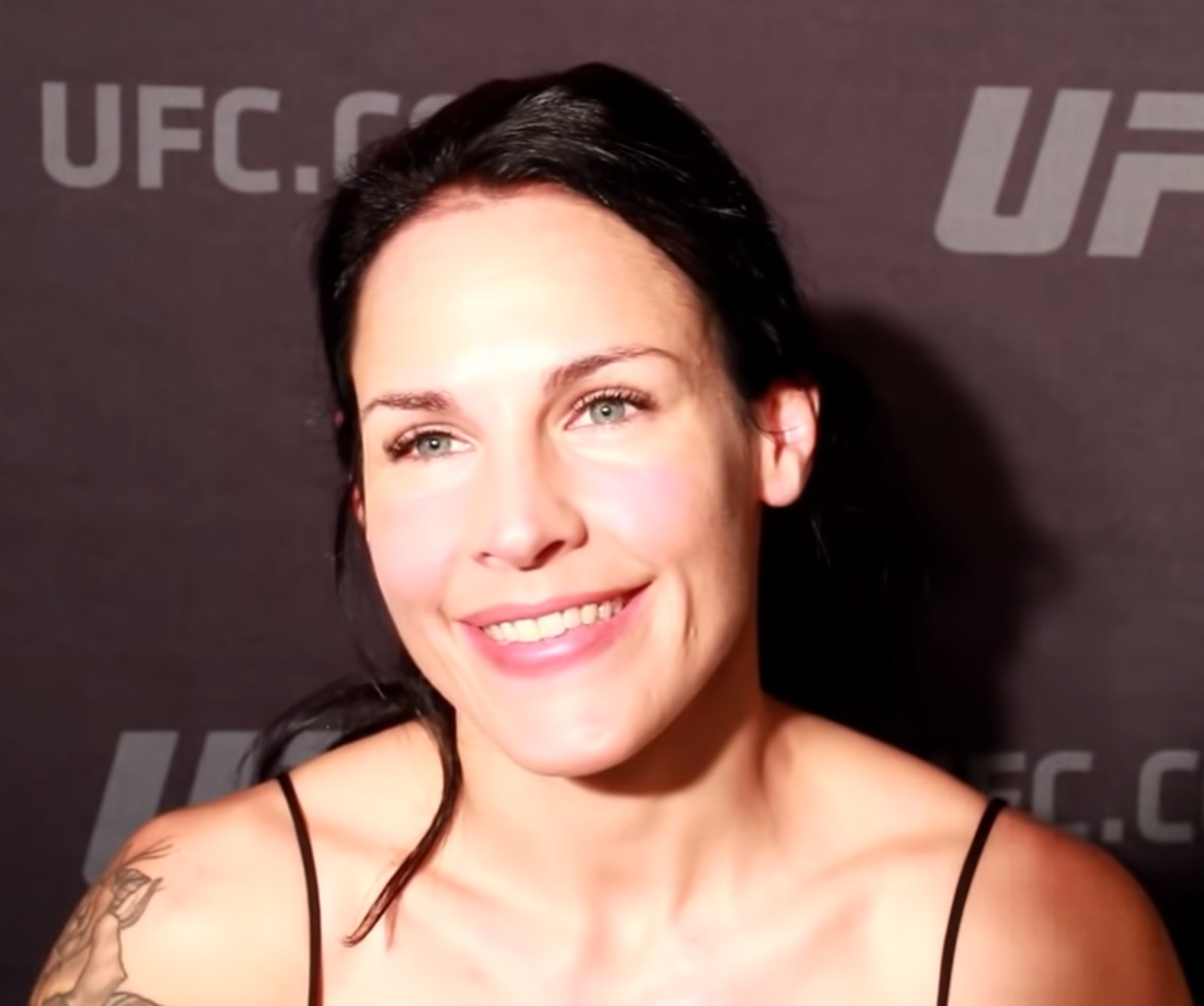
- Länsberg interviewed at UFC 229 in 2018
- Born: Lina Länsberg; 13 March 1982 (age 44); Karlstad, Sweden
- Other names: Elbow Queen
- Nationality: Swedish
- Height: 5 ft 7 in (1.70 m)
- Weight: 135 lb (61 kg; 9.6 st)
- Division: Bantamweight; Featherweight
- Reach: 65 in (165 cm)
- Style: Muay Thai, Kickboxing
- Team: Dirty South MMA; Redline Training Center
- Years active: 2005–2013 (Muay Thai); 2012–2023 (MMA)

Kickboxing record
- Total: 48
- Wins: 37
- Losses: 11

Mixed martial arts record
- Total: 18
- Wins: 10
- By knockout: 4
- By decision: 6
- Losses: 8
- By knockout: 3
- By submission: 1
- By decision: 4

Other information
- Mixed martial arts record from Sherdog

Lina Länsberg
Medal record

Representing Sweden

Women's Muay Thai

World Championships
Bronze medal – third place	2007 Bangkok	−63.5 kg
Gold medal – first place	2008 Busan	−63.5 kg
Silver medal – second place	2010 Bangkok	−63.5 kg
Silver medal – second place	2011 Tashkent	−63.5 kg
Gold medal – first place	2012 St. Petersburg	−63.5 kg

European Championships
Bronze medal – third place	2012 Antalya	−63.5 kg
Gold medal – first place	2013 Lisbon	−63.5 kg

Lina Länsberg (born 13 March 1982) is a Swedish former professional mixed martial artist. She is most notable for her time in the Ultimate Fighting Championship (UFC).

== Muay Thai career ==
Länsberg started training in Muay Thai in 2003, at the age of 21. During her decorated Muay Thai career she fought on the biggest stage, winning the gold medal at the IFMA World Championship two times, 2008 and 2012. She won the silver medal two times, 2010 and 2011, and bronze once, 2007. She also won the gold medal at the IFMA-EMF European Muay Thai Championships in 2013, and the bronze medal in 2012.

In addition to the international success, she won the Swedish Muay Thai Championship three times, in 2007, 2012 and 2013 as well as winning the Nordic Championship in 2010. She also won the WMC Scandinavian Professional Muay Thai title in 2012. Her Muay Thai record stands at 37-11, including fights against top names such as Valentina Shevchenko.

== Mixed martial arts career ==
In her professional MMA debut, Länsberg fought fellow Swedish rising star Pannie Kianzad on 29 December 2012, at Trophy MMA 1.

She would then go on to win her next 6 fights (4 by TKO, 2 by decision) as she competed in Cage Warriors and other European promotions. This included her defeating Alexandra Buch by TKO in the first round on 16 May 2015, at Superior Challenge 12, to win the promotional Women's Bantamweight title. Another big victory came by unanimous decision against Lucie Pudilová on 28 November 2015, at Battle of Botnia 2015.

=== Ultimate Fighting Championship ===
Länsberg made her UFC debut, as a big underdog, in the main event against Cris Cyborg on 24 September 2016, at UFC Fight Night 95. She lost the fight by TKO in the second round.

Länsberg was first expected to face Veronica Macedo on 18 March 2017, at UFC Fight Night 107. However, Macedo later had to pull out due to injury. Länsberg instead had a rematch with Lucie Pudilová at the same event. It was a back-and-forth fight, with Länsberg appearing to be in control over the first two rounds and Pudilová rallying for a comeback in the third, in the end Länsberg won by unanimous decision. Afterwards, she expressed disappointment with her performance, saying she believed that Pudilová maybe should have been awarded the victory. Despite this, a majority of the media score cards still agreed with the judges and had Länsberg as the winner.

Länsberg was expected to face Leslie Smith on 16 July 2017, at UFC Fight Night 113. However, she later had to withdraw from the fight due to an injury and was replaced by Amanda Lemos.

Länsberg faced Aspen Ladd on 21 October 2017, at UFC Fight Night 118. She lost the fight via TKO in round two.

Länsberg faced Gina Mazany on 27 May 2018, at UFC Fight Night 130. She won the fight via unanimous decision.

Next she faced former Invicta FC Bantamweight Champion Yana Kunitskaya on 6 October 2018, at UFC 229. She lost the fight via unanimous decision

Länsberg faced former long time Invicta FC Bantamweight Champion Tonya Evinger on 1 June 2019, at UFC Fight Night 153. Despite entering the contest as a big underdog, she won the fight via unanimous decision.

In her next fight, Länsberg faced Macy Chiasson on 28 September 2019, at UFC Fight Night 160. She won the fight by unanimous decision.

Länsberg faced Sara McMann on 25 January 2020, at UFC Fight Night 166. She lost the fight via unanimous decision.

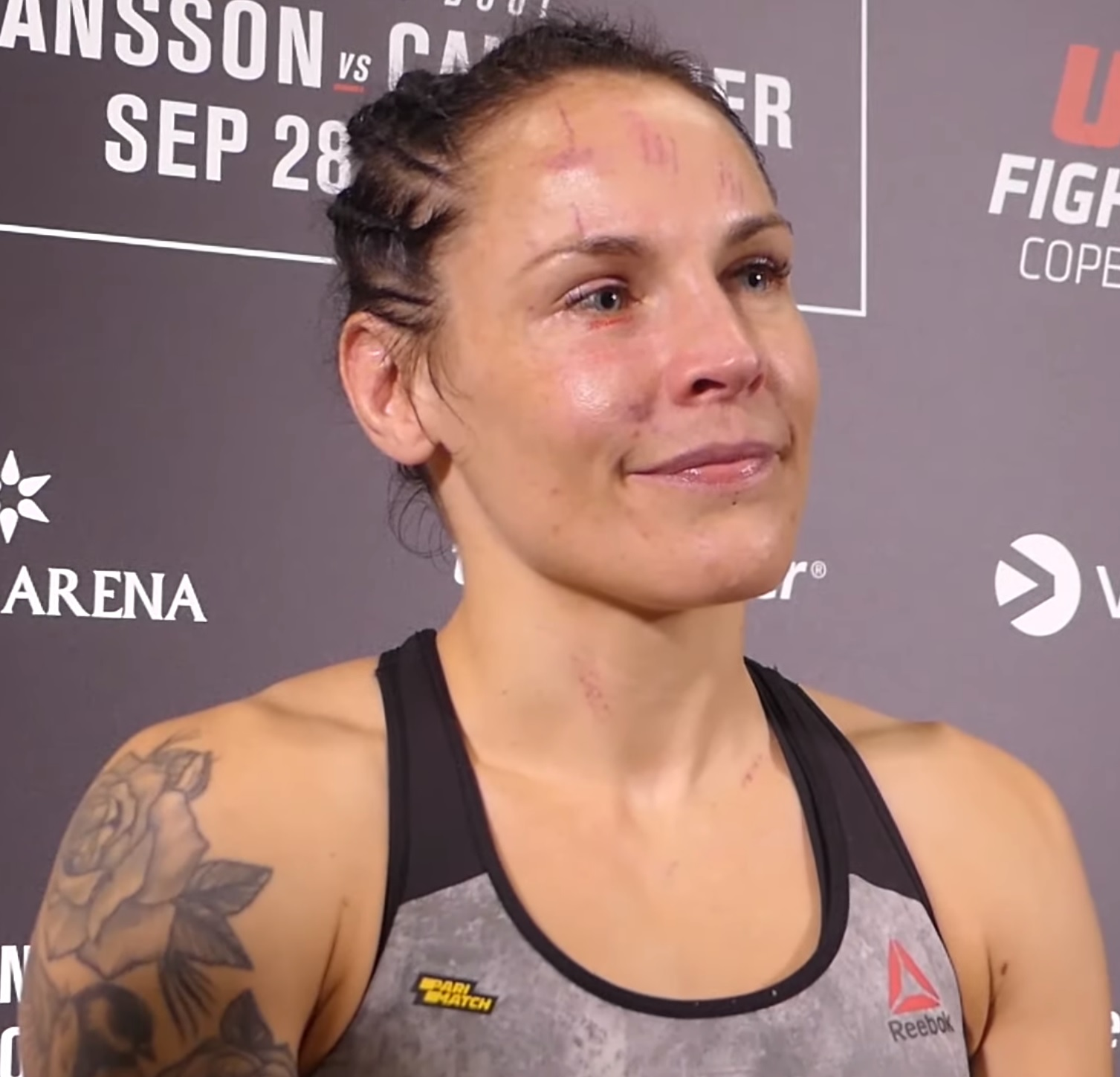
Länsberg after her 2019 victory in Copenhagen

After two years away from competing due to giving birth, Länsberg faced Pannie Kianzad on 16 April 2022 at UFC on ESPN 34. Länsberg lost the fight via unanimous decision.

Länsberg faced Karol Rosa at UFC 280 in Abu Dhabi on 22 October 2022. She lost the bout via majority decision.

Länsberg faced Mayra Bueno Silva on 18 February 2023, at UFC Fight Night 219. She lost the fight via a kneebar submission in round two.

After the bout, Länsberg retired from MMA.

== Personal life ==
Länsberg and UFC veteran Akira Corassani have a daughter (born 2021).

== Championships and accomplishments ==
=== Mixed martial arts ===
- Superior Challenge
  - SC Women's Bantamweight Championship (one time; first)
- Nordic MMA Awards
  - 2019 Female Fighter of the Year

=== Muay Thai ===
- Professional
- World Muaythai Council
  - 2012 WMC Scandinavian Professional Muay Thai Championship (-63,5 kg)
- Amateur
- IFMA
  - 2007 IFMA World Championship (bronze) (-63,5 kg)
  - 2008 IFMA World Championship (gold) (-63,5 kg)
  - 2010 IFMA World Championship (silver) (-63,5 kg)
  - 2011 IFMA World Championship (silver) (-63,5 kg)
  - 2012 IFMA-EMF European Championship (bronze) (-63,5 kg)
  - 2012 IFMA World Championship (gold) (-63,5 kg)
  - 2013 IFMA-EMF European Championship (gold) (-63,5 kg)
- Regional championships
  - 2006 Swedish National Muay Thai Championship (silver) (-63,5 kg)
  - 2007 Swedish National Muay Thai Championship (gold) (-63,5 kg)
  - 2007 Nordic Muay Thai Championship (silver) (-63,5 kg)
  - 2007 Thailand, Bangla Boxing Stadium Championship (gold) (-63,5 kg)
  - 2010 Nordic Muay Thai Championship (gold) (-63,5 kg)
  - 2011 Nordic Muay Thai Championship (silver) (-63,5 kg)
  - 2012 Antalya Turkey Championship (bronze) (-63,5 kg)
  - 2012 Swedish National Muay Thai Championship (gold) (-63,5 kg)
  - 2013 Swedish National Muay Thai Championship (gold) (-63,5 kg)

=== Shootfighting ===
- Swedish Shootfighting League
  - 2010 National Women's Featherweight Shootfighting Championship (gold)

== Mixed martial arts record ==
Professional record breakdown
18 matches	10 wins	8 losses
By knockout	4	3
By submission	0	1
By decision	6	4

Res.	Record	Opponent	Method	Event	Date	Round	Time	Location	Notes
Loss	10–8	Mayra Bueno Silva	Submission (kneebar)	UFC Fight Night: Andrade vs. Blanchfield	18 February 2023	2	4:45	Las Vegas, Nevada, United States	
Loss	10–7	Karol Rosa	Decision (majority)	UFC 280	22 October 2022	3	5:00	Abu Dhabi, United Arab Emirates	Rosa was deducted 1 point in round 2 due to an illegal knee.
Loss	10–6	Pannie Kianzad	Decision (unanimous)	UFC on ESPN: Luque vs. Muhammad 2	16 April 2022	3	5:00	Las Vegas, Nevada, United States	
Loss	10–5	Sara McMann	Decision (unanimous)	UFC Fight Night: Blaydes vs. dos Santos	25 January 2020	3	5:00	Raleigh, North Carolina, United States	
Win	10–4	Macy Chiasson	Decision (unanimous)	UFC Fight Night: Hermansson vs. Cannonier	28 September 2019	3	5:00	Copenhagen, Denmark	
Win	9–4	Tonya Evinger	Decision (unanimous)	UFC Fight Night: Gustafsson vs. Smith	1 June 2019	3	5:00	Stockholm, Sweden	
Loss	8–4	Yana Kunitskaya	Decision (unanimous)	UFC 229	6 October 2018	3	5:00	Las Vegas, Nevada, United States	
Win	8–3	Gina Mazany	Decision (unanimous)	UFC Fight Night: Thompson vs. Till	27 May 2018	3	5:00	Liverpool, England	
Loss	7–3	Aspen Ladd	TKO (punches)	UFC Fight Night: Cowboy vs. Till	21 October 2017	2	2:33	Gdańsk, Poland	
Win	7–2	Lucie Pudilová	Decision (unanimous)	UFC Fight Night: Manuwa vs. Anderson	18 March 2017	3	5:00	London, England	
Loss	6–2	Cris Cyborg	TKO (punches)	UFC Fight Night: Cyborg vs. Länsberg	24 September 2016	2	2:29	Brasília, Brazil	Catchweight (140 lb) bout.
Win	6–1	Maria Hougaard Djursaa	TKO (punches)	Odense Fight Night 5	12 March 2016	2	2:00	Odense, Denmark	Featherweight bout.
Win	5–1	Lucie Pudilová	Decision (unanimous)	Battle of Botnia 2015	28 November 2015	3	5:00	Umeå, Sweden	
Win	4–1	Alexandra Buch	TKO (punches and elbows)	Superior Challenge 12	16 May 2015	1	2:33	Malmö, Sweden	Won the SC Women's Bantamweight Championship.
Win	3–1	Laura Howarth	TKO (retirement)	Cage Warriors FC 71	22 August 2014	1	5:00	Amman, Jordan	
Win	2–1	Emma Delaney	TKO (punches and elbows)	Cage Warriors FC 66	22 March 2014	3	2:26	Ballerup, Denmark	Bantamweight debut.
Win	1–1	L.J. Adams	Decision (unanimous)	Heroes FC	23 March 2013	3	5:00	Halmstad, Sweden	Catchweight (139 lb) bout.
Loss	0–1	Pannie Kianzad	TKO (punches)	Trophy MMA 1	12 December 2012	3	4:44	Malmö, Sweden	

== See also ==
- List of female mixed martial artists
