= UFC Fight Night: Blaydes vs. dos Santos =

UFC mixed martial arts event in 2020

- The poster for UFC Fight Night: Blaydes vs. dos Santos
- Promotion: Ultimate Fighting Championship
- Date: January 25, 2020
- Venue: PNC Arena
- City: Raleigh, North Carolina, United States
- Attendance: 14,533
- Total gate: $1,303,320

Event chronology
UFC 246: McGregor vs. Cowboy	UFC Fight Night: Blaydes vs. dos Santos	UFC 247: Jones vs. Reyes

UFC Fight Night: Blaydes vs. dos Santos (also known as UFC Fight Night 166 and UFC on ESPN+ 24) was a mixed martial arts event produced by the Ultimate Fighting Championship that took place on January 25, 2020, at PNC Arena in Raleigh, North Carolina, United States.

== Background ==
The event was the first that the promotion hosted in Raleigh and first in North Carolina since UFC on Fox: Jacaré vs. Brunson 2 in January 2018.

A heavyweight bout between Curtis Blaydes and former UFC Heavyweight Champion Junior dos Santos served as the event headliner.

A bantamweight bout was scheduled between former UFC Lightweight Champion Frankie Edgar and Cory Sandhagen at the event. However, Edgar was withdrawn from the fight in favour of facing Chan Sung Jung in a featherweight bout at UFC Fight Night: Edgar vs. The Korean Zombie after Jung's original opponent, former featherweight title challenger Brian Ortega, pulled out due to a knee injury. In turn, Sandhagen was removed from the card and expected to be rescheduled for a future event after promotion officials deemed that a suitable opponent could not be arranged.

A middleweight bout between Bevon Lewis and Alen Amedovski was scheduled to take place at the event. However, Amedovski was forced to pull out of the event citing injury and was replaced by Dequan Townsend.

A strawweight bout between Hannah Cifers and Brianna Van Buren was scheduled to take place at the event. However, Van Buren was pulled from the event due to undisclosed reasons and replaced by former Invicta FC Strawweight Champion Angela Hill.

Featherweight fighters Josh Emmett and Nad Narimani pulled out of their scheduled fights against Arnold Allen and Nik Lentz respectively, citing injuries. As a result, Allen and Lentz faced each other at the event.

== Results ==
Main Card (ESPN+)
Weight class				Method	Round	Time	Notes
Heavyweight	Curtis Blaydes	def.	Junior dos Santos	TKO (punches)	2	1:06
Welterweight	Michael Chiesa	def.	Rafael dos Anjos	Decision (unanimous) (30–27, 29–28, 29–28)	3	5:00
Flyweight	Alex Perez	def.	Jordan Espinosa	Technical Submission (arm-triangle choke)	1	2:33
Women's Strawweight	Angela Hill	def.	Hannah Cifers	TKO (elbows and punches)	2	4:26
Light Heavyweight	Jamahal Hill	def.	Darko Stošić	Decision (unanimous) (29–27, 29–27, 29–27)	3	5:00
Preliminary Card (ESPN+)
Weight class				Method	Round	Time	Notes
Middleweight	Bevon Lewis	def.	Dequan Townsend	Decision (unanimous) (30–27, 30–27, 30–27)	3	5:00
Featherweight	Arnold Allen	def.	Nik Lentz	Decision (unanimous) (29–28, 29–28, 30–27)	3	5:00
Women's Flyweight	Justine Kish	def.	Lucie Pudilová	Decision (unanimous) (30–27, 30–27, 30–27)	3	5:00
Bantamweight	Montel Jackson	def.	Felipe Colares	Decision (unanimous) (30–26, 30–26, 30–25)	3	5:00
Women's Bantamweight	Sara McMann	def.	Lina Länsberg	Decision (unanimous) (30–27, 30–26, 30–25)	3	5:00
Bantamweight	Brett Johns	def.	Tony Gravely	Submission (rear-naked choke)	3	2:53
Featherweight	Herbert Burns	def.	Nate Landwehr	KO (knee)	1	2:43

== Bonus awards ==
The following fighters received $50,000 bonuses.

- Fight of the Night: Brett Johns vs. Tony Gravely
- Performance of the Night: Alex Perez and Herbert Burns

== See also ==
- List of UFC events
- List of current UFC fighters
- 2020 in UFC
