= UFC Fight Night: Manuwa vs. Anderson =

2017 mixed martial arts event

- The poster for UFC Fight Night: Manuwa vs. Anderson
- Promotion: Ultimate Fighting Championship
- Date: March 18, 2017
- Venue: The O_{2} Arena
- City: London, England
- Attendance: 15,761
- Total gate: $2,015,777

Event chronology
UFC Fight Night: Belfort vs. Gastelum	UFC Fight Night: Manuwa vs. Anderson	UFC 210: Cormier vs. Johnson 2

UFC Fight Night: Manuwa vs. Anderson (also known as UFC Fight Night 107) was a mixed martial arts event produced by the Ultimate Fighting Championship held on March 18, 2017, at The O_{2} Arena in London, England.

== Background ==
This event was expected to be UFC Fight Night 108, but an initially planned UFN 106 in Las Vegas, Nevada never materialised, prompting the change in numbers.

A light heavyweight bout between Jimi Manuwa and The Ultimate Fighter: Team Edgar vs. Team Penn light heavyweight winner Corey Anderson headlined the event,

Brad Pickett was expected to face Henry Briones, in what would be his retirement bout. However, Briones pulled out a week before the event and was replaced by Marlon Vera. Due to the short notice and preparation for Vera, the bout was contested at a catchweight of 140 lb. After this fight, Pickett placed his gloves on the canvas of the octagon and announced his retirement.

Veronica Macedo was expected to face Lina Länsberg at the event. However, Macedo pulled out of the fight on February 28. She was replaced by promotional newcomer Lucie Pudilová. The fighters first met in 2015, when Länsberg won via unanimous decision at Battle of Botnia 2015 in Sweden.

At the weigh-ins, Ian Entwistle came in at 139 lb, three pounds over the bantamweight limit of 136 lb. As a result, he was fined 20% of his purse, which would go to his opponent Brett Johns and the bout would proceed at a catchweight. However, Entwistle was pulled from the fight on the day of the event and the bout was cancelled.

Moments before the start of the event, Tom Breese was deemed unfit to compete and was pulled from his bout against Oluwale Bamgbose.

== Results ==
Main Card (UFC Fight Pass)
Weight class				Method	Round	Time	Notes
Light Heavyweight	Jimi Manuwa	def.	Corey Anderson	KO (punch)	1	3:05
Welterweight	Gunnar Nelson	def.	Alan Jouban	Submission (guillotine choke)	2	0:46
Catchweight (140 lb)	Marlon Vera	def.	Brad Pickett	TKO (head kick and punches)	3	3:50
Featherweight	Arnold Allen	def.	Makwan Amirkhani	Decision (split) (28–29, 30–27, 30–27)	3	5:00
Preliminary Card (UFC Fight Pass)
Lightweight	Joe Duffy	def.	Reza Madadi	Decision (unanimous) (30–27, 30–27, 30–27)	3	5:00
Light Heavyweight	Francimar Barroso	def.	Darren Stewart	Decision (unanimous) (29–28, 29–28, 29–28)	3	5:00
Heavyweight	Timothy Johnson	def.	Daniel Omielańczuk	Decision (split) (28–29, 30–27, 29–28)	3	5:00
Welterweight	Leon Edwards	def.	Vicente Luque	Decision (unanimous) (29–28, 29–28, 29–28)	3	5:00
Lightweight	Marc Diakiese	def.	Teemu Packalén	KO (punch)	1	0:30
Middleweight	Brad Scott	def.	Scott Askham	Decision (split) (28–29, 29–28, 29–28)	3	5:00
Women's Bantamweight	Lina Länsberg	def.	Lucie Pudilová	Decision (unanimous) (29–28, 29–28, 29–28)	3	5:00

== Bonus awards ==
The following fighters were awarded $50,000 bonuses:

- Fight of the Night: Not awarded
- Performance of the Night: Jimi Manuwa, Gunnar Nelson, Marlon Vera and Marc Diakiese

== See also ==
- List of UFC events
- 2017 in UFC
