= Lucie Pudilová =

Czech mixed martial arts fighter

- Born: June 13, 1994 (age 32); Příbram, Czech Republic
- Other names: Bullet
- Height: 5 ft 8 in (1.73 m)
- Weight: 135 lb (61 kg; 9 st 9 lb)
- Division: Bantamweight
- Reach: 67.5 in (171 cm)
- Stance: Orthodox
- Fighting out of: Příbram, Czech Republic
- Team: KBC Příbram-MMA
- Trainer: Ladislav Erdélyi John Kavanagh
- Rank: Purple belt in Brazilian jiu-jitsu
- Years active: 2014–present

Mixed martial arts record
- Total: 29
- Wins: 17
- By knockout: 3
- By submission: 2
- By decision: 12
- Losses: 12
- By submission: 1
- By decision: 11

Other information
- Mixed martial arts record from Sherdog

Lucie Pudilová (born June 13, 1994) is a Czech female mixed martial artist who competed in the Bantamweight division of the Ultimate Fighting Championship (UFC). She was the Gladiator Championship Fighting Bantamweight female champion in Czech Republic.

== Background ==
Pudilová started training MMA when she was 16 years old. She worked with her coach, Ladislav Erdélyi, to achieve her goal of fighting in the UFC.

== Mixed martial arts career ==
=== Early career ===
Pudilová fought most of her early MMA career in Europe. Her win over Melinda Fábián, an The Ultimate Fighter 26 contestant, earned her the title of Bantamweight Champion for the Gladiator Championship Fighting promotion in Czech Republic. Pudilová amassed a record of 6–1 prior to being signed by UFC, with the one loss to Lina Länsberg. Pudilová is the third Czech to be signed by UFC.

=== Ultimate Fighting Championship ===
Pudilová made her promotion debut on March 18, 2017, replacing injured Veronica Macedo, at UFC Fight Night: Manuwa vs. Anderson against Lina Länsberg in a rematch in London. After three close rounds of fierce fighting, she lost the fight via unanimous decision. At the post fight interview, Länsberg, with a badly battered right eye, argued that she might think Pudilová had done enough to be declared the winner. However, a majority of the media score cards still agreed with the judges and saw Länsberg as the winner.

Her second fight came on June 17, 2017, in Singapore at UFC Fight Night: Holm vs. Correia. She faced Ji Yeon Kim and won the fight via unanimous decision.

Pudilová faced Sarah Moras on February 18, 2018, at UFC Fight Night: Cowboy vs. Medeiros. She won the fight by unanimous decision.

Pudilová faced Irene Aldana on September 8, 2018, at UFC 228. She lost the close fight via split decision. This fight earned her the Fight of the Night award.

Pudilová faced Liz Carmouche on February 23, 2019, at UFC on ESPN+ 3. She lost the fight by unanimous decision.

Pudilová faced Antonina Shevchenko on August 3, 2019, at UFC on ESPN 5. She lost the fight via technical submission due to a rear-naked choke in the second round. Despite the loss, the bout earned Pudilová her second Fight of the Night bonus award.

Pudilová faced Justine Kish on January 25, 2020, at UFC Fight Night 166. She lost he fight via unanimous decision.

Pudilová was released by the UFC on February 11, 2020.

=== Regional circuit ===
After her release from the UFC, Pudilová returned to the European regional circuit. She entered a tournament organized under the banner of a Czech promotion Oktagon MMA, "Underground". All fights in the tournament were officially recorded as exhibition bouts, with 3 minute rounds and a slightly modified ruleset. In the quarterfinals round she faced an 18 year old amateur fighter Tereza Bledá, in a main event at Oktagon Underground 3 held on May 25, 2020. She lost the fight by unanimous decision, getting eliminated from the tournament. With this loss, her losing streak was extended to 5.

Pudilová was scheduled to face Maguy Berchel on August 19, 2020, at Noc Bojovníků in Dobříš. However, a few days before the event Berchel reacted with confusion to a social media post about the match, and subsequently claimed that the fight with Pudilová was never offered to her. The event's promoter maintained that the bout was set up and agreed upon with Berchel's management. It was announced that a replacement is being sought for Pudilová, but the event was eventually cancelled altogether due to restrictions related to the COVID-19 pandemic.

=== Oktagon MMA ===
In October 2020, it was announced that Pudilová signed a contract with the Czech promotion Oktagon MMA.

She was scheduled to face Marta Waliczek at Oktagon 18 on November 21, 2020. The bout was later cancelled, as Waliczek withdrew due to illness.

She then faced Cornelia Holm at Oktagon 19 on December 5, 2020. She won the fight via unanimous decision.

The cancelled bout with Waliczek was rescheduled and took place at Oktagon 21 on January 30, 2021. She won the fight via controversial split decision.

Pudilová then faced Maiju Suotama at Oktagon 22 on March 27, 2021, as a short notice replacement for Marta Waliczek. She won the fight via unanimous decision.

Pudilová faced fellow former UFC fighter, Talita Bernardo, on July 24, 2021, at OKTAGON 26. She lost the one-sided bout via unanimous decision.

A rematch with Waliczek took place on November 6, 2021, at Oktagon Prime 4. Pudilová won via split decision. In preparation for this fight, she trained at Straight Blast Gym Ireland with coach John Kavanagh.

Pudilová was scheduled to face former Bellator title challenger Olga Rubin on February 26, 2022, at OKTAGON 31. However, Rubin withdrew from the fight due to an injury and was replaced by Priscila de Souza, who was originally slated to fight Cornelia Holm at the same event. At the weigh-ins, De Souza came in 3.7 pounds over the non-title fight limit at bantamweight. After failing to make weight on her second attempt, Pudilová's team decided not to accept a catchweight and the fight was scrapped from the card.

Pudilová faced Carol Yariwaki on April 9, 2022, at Oktagon 32. She won the bout via unanimous decision.

=== Return to UFC ===
After going 5–1 after her UFC release, fighting for the Oktagon promotion in her native Czech Republic, Pudilová re-signed with the UFC.

Pudilová faced Wu Yanan on August 20, 2022, at UFC 278. She won the bout via TKO stoppage in the second round due to elbows on the ground.

Pudilová faced Joselyne Edwards on April 15, 2023, at UFC on ESPN 44. She lost via controversial split decision in which 15 of 15 MMA journalists gave her the decision.

Pudilová faced Ailín Pérez on November 18, 2023, at UFC Fight Night 232. She lost the fight by unanimous decision.

Pudilová faced Luana Carolina in a flyweight bout on July 20, 2024, at UFC on ESPN 60. She lost the fight by unanimous decision.

On July 30, 2024, it was reported that Pudilová was removed from the UFC roster.

== Championships and accomplishments ==
=== Mixed martial arts ===
- Ultimate Fighting Championship
  - Fight of the Night (Two times) vs. Irene Aldana and Antonina Shevchenko
- Gladiator Championship Fighting
  - Gladiator Championship Fighting Bantamweight Champion (One time) vs. Melinda Fabián

== Personal life ==
Prior to being a professional fighter, Pudilová was a student at the Business Middle School in Czech Republic.

== Mixed martial arts record ==
Professional record breakdown
29 matches	17 wins	12 losses
By knockout	3	0
By submission	2	1
By decision	12	11

Res.	Record	Opponent	Method	Event	Date	Round	Time	Location	Notes
Loss	17–12	Lucia Szabová	Decision (unanimous)	Oktagon 92	August 1, 2026	5	5:00	Prague, Czech Republic	For the Oktagon Women's Bantamweight Championship.
Win	17–11	Katharina Lehner	Decision (unanimous)	Oktagon 83	January 31, 2026	3	5:00	Stuttgart, Germany	
Win	16–11	Brittney Cloudy	Decision (unanimous)	Oktagon 69	April 5, 2025	3	5:00	Dortmund, Germany	
Loss	15–11	Cecilie Bolander	Decision (split)	Oktagon 65	December 29, 2024	5	5:00	Prague, Czech Republic	For the inaugural Oktagon Women's Bantamweight Championship.
Win	15–10	Cecilie Bolander	Decision (split)	Oktagon 61	September 21, 2024	3	5:00	Brno, Czech Republic	
Loss	14–10	Luana Carolina	Decision (unanimous)	UFC on ESPN: Lemos vs. Jandiroba	July 20, 2024	3	5:00	Las Vegas, Nevada, United States	Flyweight bout.
Loss	14–9	Ailín Pérez	Decision (unanimous)	UFC Fight Night: Allen vs. Craig	November 18, 2023	3	5:00	Las Vegas, Nevada, United States	
Loss	14–8	Joselyne Edwards	Decision (split)	UFC on ESPN: Holloway vs. Allen	April 15, 2023	3	5:00	Kansas City, Missouri, United States	Catchweight (136.5 lb) bout; Edwards missed weight.
Win	14–7	Wu Yanan	TKO (elbows)	UFC 278	August 20, 2022	2	4:04	Salt Lake City, Utah, United States	
Win	13–7	Carol Yariwaki	Decision (unanimous)	Oktagon 32	April 9, 2022	3	5:00	Ostrava, Czech Republic	
Win	12–7	Marta Waliczek	Decision (split)	Oktagon Prime 4	November 6, 2021	3	5:00	Pardubice, Czech Republic	
Loss	11–7	Talita Bernardo	Decision (unanimous)	Oktagon 26	July 24, 2021	3	5:00	Prague, Czech Republic	
Win	11–6	Maiju Suotama	Decision (unanimous)	Oktagon 22	March 27, 2021	3	5:00	Brno, Czech Republic	Catchweight (141 lb) bout.
Win	10–6	Marta Waliczek	Decision (split)	Oktagon 21	January 30, 2021	3	5:00	Brno, Czech Republic	
Win	9–6	Cornelia Holm	Decision (unanimous)	Oktagon 19	December 5, 2020	3	5:00	Brno, Czech Republic	Return to Bantamweight.
Loss	8–6	Justine Kish	Decision (unanimous)	UFC Fight Night: Blaydes vs. dos Santos	January 25, 2020	3	5:00	Raleigh, North Carolina, United States	
Loss	8–5	Antonina Shevchenko	Technical Submission (rear-naked choke)	UFC on ESPN: Covington vs. Lawler	August 3, 2019	2	1:20	Newark, New Jersey, United States	Fight of the Night.
Loss	8–4	Liz Carmouche	Decision (unanimous)	UFC Fight Night: Błachowicz vs. Santos	February 23, 2019	3	5:00	Prague, Czech Republic	Return to Flyweight.
Loss	8–3	Irene Aldana	Decision (split)	UFC 228	September 8, 2018	3	5:00	Dallas, Texas, United States	Fight of the Night.
Win	8–2	Sarah Moras	Decision (unanimous)	UFC Fight Night: Cowboy vs. Medeiros	February 18, 2018	3	5:00	Austin, Texas, United States	
Win	7–2	Kim Ji-yeon	Decision (unanimous)	UFC Fight Night: Holm vs. Correia	June 17, 2017	3	5:00	Kallang, Singapore	
Loss	6–2	Lina Länsberg	Decision (unanimous)	UFC Fight Night: Manuwa vs. Anderson	March 18, 2017	3	5:00	London, England	
Win	6–1	Alexandra Buch	Submission (guillotine choke)	Clash FC: Clash of the Titans	November 19, 2016	1	N/A	Plzeň, Czech Republic	
Win	5–1	Eeva Siiskonen	Submission (armbar)	MMA Imatra: Carelia Fight 12	September 10, 2016	2	4:06	Imatra, Finland	
Win	4–1	Melinda Fábián	Decision (split)	Gladiator CF 34	March 25, 2016	5	5:00	Příbram, Czech Republic	Won the GCF Women's Bantamweight Championship.
Loss	3–1	Lina Länsberg	Decision (unanimous)	Battle of Botnia 2015	November 26, 2015	3	5:00	Umeå, Sweden	Return to Bantamweight.
Win	3–0	Suvi Salmimies	Decision (split)	Cage 31	September 19, 2015	3	5:00	Helsinki, Finland	Flyweight debut.
Win	2–0	Julija Stoliarenko	TKO (corner stoppage)	GCF Challenge: Back in the Fight 4	March 27, 2015	2	5:00	Příbram, Czech Republic	Catchweight (143 lb) bout.
Win	1–0	Lenka Smetánková	TKO (corner stoppage)	GCF Challenge: Back in the Fight 3	February 14, 2014	1	3:00	Příbram, Czech Republic	Bantamweight debut.

Exhibition record breakdown		
1 match	0 wins	1 loss
By decision	0	1

Res.	Record	Opponent	Method	Event	Date	Round	Time	Location	Notes
Loss	0–1	Tereza Bledá	Decision (unanimous)	Oktagon Underground 3	May 30, 2020	3	3:00	Prague, Czech Republic	Oktagon Underground quarterfinals round.

== See also ==
- List of current UFC fighters
- List of female mixed martial artists
