= Stefan Janos (fighter) =

German sambist, judoka, kickboxer and MMA fighter

- Born: Janosch Stefan; April 16, 1981 (age 45); Karlsruhe, West Germany
- Other names: The Rock
- Nationality: German
- Height: 1.91 m (6 ft 3 in)
- Weight: 112 kg (247 lb; 17.6 st)
- Division: Heavyweight
- Style: Combat Sambo
- Team: Alliance 1/Mach
- Years active: 2010–present (MMA)

Mixed martial arts record
- Total: 9
- Wins: 5
- By knockout: 2
- By submission: 2
- By decision: 1
- Losses: 4
- By knockout: 2
- By submission: 2

Other information
- Mixed martial arts record from Sherdog

Stefan Janos
Medal record

Men's Combat Sambo

Representing Germany

World Combat Games
Gold medal – first place	2010 Beijing	+100 kg

World Championships
Silver medal – second place	2008 St. Petersburg	+100 kg

Stefan Janos (born Janosch Stefan) is a German Sambo, mixed martial artist and Judo practitioner who won the Silver Medal at the 2008 World Sambo Championships, in Men's Combat Sambo. Janosch defeated Pedro Brett (Venezuela), Volodimir Begeza (Ukraine), and Arsen Khachatryan (Armenia) without giving up a point before falling to eventual champion Blagoi Ivanov (Bulgaria) in the final. Janosch has also competed in many grappling competitions, and recently began a career in mixed martial arts.

== Mixed martial arts record ==
Professional record breakdown
9 matches	5 wins	4 losses
By knockout	2	2
By submission	2	2
By decision	1	0

Res.	Record	Opponent	Method	Event	Date	Round	Time	Location	Notes
Win	5–4	Bjoern Schmiedeberg	Decision (majority)	GMC 5 – German MMA Championship	September 13, 2014	3	5:00	Castrop-Rauxel, Germany	
Loss	4–4	Dritan Barjamaj	TKO (corner stoppage)	RA 1 – Respect Austria 1	February 2, 2013	3	3:00	Freistadt, Austria	
Loss	4–3	Dritan Barjamaj	KO (knee and punch)	Respect Fighting Championship 8	September 22, 2012	2	1:10	Wuppertal, Germany	
Win	4-2	Murat Gezerci	Submission (keylock)	Respect Fighting Championship 7	April 21, 2012	1	2:55	Essen, Germany	
Loss	3-2	Sultan Kasanow	Submission (punches)	Riad Rumble	July 2, 2011	2	2:20	Castrop-Rauxel, North Rhine-Westphalia, Germany	
Win	3-1	Igor Swonkin	Submission (strikes)	SFC 4 – Germany vs. Russia	June 12, 2011	1	0:42	Giessen, Germany	
Loss	2-1	Karol Celinski	Submission (rear-naked choke)	IFF – The Eternal Struggle	October 8, 2010	3	2:16	Dąbrowa Górnicza, Silesian Voivodeship, Poland	
Win	2-0	Thorsten Klein	TKO (knee)	RFC – Respect Fighting Championship 4	September 11, 2010	1	0:49	Herne, North Rhine-Westphalia, Germany	
Win	1-0	Nacim Bouaita	KO (punch)	Backstreet Fights 3 – Herb vs. Babene	April 10, 2010	1	3:35	Heilbronn, Germany	MMA debut
