= Ji Yeon Kim (fighter) =

Korean mixed martial artist

- Born: Kim Ji-yeon; October 18, 1989 (age 37); Incheon, South Korea
- Other names: Fire Fist
- Height: 5 ft 7 in (1.70 m)
- Weight: 56.7 kg (125 lb; 8 st 13 lb)
- Division: Bantamweight (2013–2017); Flyweight (2018–present)
- Reach: 72 in (183 cm)
- Fighting out of: Las Vegas, Nevada, United States
- Team: Impact Gym; MOB Training Center; Syndicate MMA (2021–present)
- Rank: Brown Belt in Brazilian Jiu-Jitsu; 3rd Degree Black Belt in Hapkido; Black Belt in Kung Fu
- Years active: 2013–present

Mixed martial arts record
- Total: 18
- Wins: 9
- By knockout: 2
- By submission: 3
- By decision: 4
- Losses: 7
- By decision: 7
- Draws: 2

Other information
- Mixed martial arts record from Sherdog

Korean name
- Hangul: 김지연
- Hanja: 金志妍
- RR: Gim Jiyeon
- MR: Kim Chiyŏn

Kim Ji-yeon (Korean: 김지연; born October 18, 1989), often anglicized Ji Yeon Kim, is a South Korean mixed martial artist (MMA). She was the Jewels and Gladiator women's bantamweight champion. She competed in the Women's Flyweight division of the Ultimate Fighting Championship.

== Background ==
Kim was born and raised in Incheon, South Korea. She started training in the 8th grade after seeing a kickboxing match on television, which set off her desire for a career in combat sports. She also wrestled in junior middle school and high school in her native South Korea.

== Mixed martial arts career ==
=== Early career ===
Kim started her professional MMA career in 2013 and fought primarily in South Korea and Japan. Kim acquired a six-fight winning streak and became the Jewels and Gladiator women's bantamweight champion prior to joining the UFC.

=== Ultimate Fighting Championship ===
Kim made her UFC debut on June 17, 2017. Kim faced Lucie Pudilová at UFC Fight Night: Holm vs. Correia in Singapore. She lost the fight via unanimous decision.

Kim next faced Justine Kish on January 27, 2018, at UFC on Fox: Jacaré vs. Brunson. She won the fight via split decision.

Her third fight came on June 23, 2018, at UFC Fight Night: Cerrone vs. Edwards against Melinda Fábián. She won the fight via split decision.

Kim faced Antonina Shevchenko, replacing injured Ashlee Evans-Smith, on November 30, 2018, at The Ultimate Fighter 28 Finale. At the weigh-ins, Kim weighed in at 130.5 pounds, 4.5 pounds over the flyweight non-title fight limit of 126. She was fined 20 percent of her purse, which went to her opponent Shevchenko. The bout proceeded at catchweight. She lost the fight via unanimous decision.

Kim faced Nadia Kassem on October 6, 2019, at UFC 243. At the weigh-ins, Kim weighed in at 128 pounds, 2 pound over the flyweight non-title fight limit of 126. Kim was fined 30% of her purse, which went to her opponent Kassem. In a fight where Kassem drew heavy criticism for faking a respectful glove touch to deliver a kick, Kim won the fight via technical knockout in round two.

Kim was scheduled to face Sabina Mazo on December 21, 2019, on UFC on ESPN+ 23. However, on November 1, 2019, it was reported that Kim was forced to pull from the event due to undisclosed injury.

Kim was scheduled to face Alexa Grasso on June 27, 2020, at UFC on ESPN: Poirier vs. Hooker. However, due to travel restrictions for both fighters due to COVID-19 pandemic, the bout was rescheduled on August 29, 2020, at UFC Fight Night 175. She lost the fight via unanimous decision.

Kim was scheduled to face Poliana Botelho on May 1, 2021, at UFC on ESPN 23. However, Kim pulled out of the fight on March 22 citing injury and was replaced by Mayra Bueno Silva.

Kim faced Molly McCann on September 4, 2021, at UFC Fight Night 191. She lost the fight via unanimous decision. The back-and-forth bout won both contestants the Fight of the Night bonus award.

Kim was scheduled to face Poliana Botelho on January 22, 2022, at UFC 270, but Botelho pulled out instead and the pairing was scrapped.

Kim faced Priscila Cachoeira on February 26, 2022, at UFC Fight Night 202. She lost the bout via controversial unanimous decision. 14 out of 15 media scored Kim as the winner of the fight. Along with Cachoeira, Kim was awarded the Fight of the Night bonus award; her second overall.

Kim was scheduled to face Mariya Agapova at UFC 277 on July 30, 2022. However, Agapova was forced out of the fight due to knee injury and she was replaced by Joselyne Edwards. She lost the fight via split decision.

Kim was scheduled to face Mandy Böhm on February 4, 2023, at UFC Fight Night 218. However, Böhm was forced to withdraw before the event start due to illness and the bout was cancelled. The pair was rebooked for UFC on ABC 4. Kim lost the fight via a split technical decision (27–28, 28–27, 28–27) after receiving two separate point deductions for fouls, the second of which resulted in the fight being stopped part way through the third round after Böhm could no longer continue.

After the loss, it was reported on May 16 that Kim was no longer on the UFC roster.

== Championships and accomplishments ==
=== Mixed martial arts ===
- Ultimate Fighting Championship
  - Fight of the Night (Two times) vs. Molly McCann and Priscila Cachoeira
  - Tied (Michelle Waterson-Gomez, Cynthia Calvillo, Marion Reneau & Istela Nunes) for the second longest losing streak in UFC Women's history (5) (behind Andrea Lee)
- Jewels (mixed martial arts)
  - Jewels Bantamweight Champion (One time) vs. Takayo Hashi
- Gladiator
  - Gladiator Bantamweight Champion (One time) vs. Miki Miyauchi

== Mixed martial arts record ==
Professional record breakdown
18 matches	9 wins	7 losses
By knockout	2	0
By submission	3	0
By decision	4	7
Draws	2	

Res.	Record	Opponent	Method	Event	Date	Round	Time	Location	Notes
Loss	9–7–2	Mandy Böhm	Technical Decision (split)	UFC on ABC: Rozenstruik vs. Almeida	May 13, 2023	3	1:55	Charlotte, North Carolina, United States	Kim was deducted 1 point after round 2 due to striking Böhm after the bell. She was deducted another point in round 3 due to an illegal knee to a grounded opponent which rendered Böhm unable to continue.
Loss	9–6–2	Joselyne Edwards	Decision (split)	UFC 277	July 30, 2022	3	5:00	Dallas, Texas, United States	Bantamweight bout; Edwards missed weight (137.5 lb).
Loss	9–5–2	Priscila Cachoeira	Decision (unanimous)	UFC Fight Night: Makhachev vs. Green	February 26, 2022	3	5:00	Las Vegas, Nevada, United States	Fight of the Night.
Loss	9–4–2	Molly McCann	Decision (unanimous)	UFC Fight Night: Brunson vs. Till	September 4, 2021	3	5:00	Las Vegas, Nevada, United States	Fight of the Night.
Loss	9–3–2	Alexa Grasso	Decision (unanimous)	UFC Fight Night: Smith vs. Rakić	August 29, 2020	3	5:00	Las Vegas, Nevada, United States	
Win	9–2–2	Nadia Kassem	KO (punches to the body)	UFC 243	October 6, 2019	2	4:59	Melbourne, Australia	Catchweight (128 lb) bout; Kim missed weight.
Loss	8–2–2	Antonina Shevchenko	Decision (unanimous)	The Ultimate Fighter: Heavy Hitters Finale	November 30, 2018	3	5:00	Las Vegas, Nevada, United States	Catchweight (130.5 lb) bout; Kim missed weight.
Win	8–1–2	Melinda Fábián	Decision (split)	UFC Fight Night: Cerrone vs. Edwards	June 23, 2018	3	5:00	Kallang, Singapore	
Win	7–1–2	Justine Kish	Decision (split)	UFC on Fox: Jacaré vs. Brunson	January 27, 2018	3	5:00	Charlotte, North Carolina, United States	Flyweight debut.
Loss	6–1–2	Lucie Pudilová	Decision (unanimous)	UFC Fight Night: Holm vs. Correia	June 17, 2017	3	5:00	Kallang, Singapore	
Win	6–0–2	Tao Li	Submission (rear-naked choke)	Top FC 13	November 5, 2016	2	1:30	Seoul, South Korea	
Win	5–0–2	Jin Tang	Decision (unanimous)	Kunlun Fight: Cage Fight Series 5 / Top FC 11	May 22, 2016	3	5:00	Seoul, South Korea	Catchweight (131 lb) bout.
Win	4–0–2	Takayo Hashi	Decision (unanimous)	Deep Jewels 9	August 29, 2015	3	5;00	Tokyo, Japan	Won the Jewels Women's Bantamweight Championship.
Win	3–0–2	Hatice Ozyurt	Submission (armbar)	Road FC 23	May 2, 2015	2	1:14	Seoul, South Korea	Catchweight (138.2 lb) bout; Ozyurt missed weight.
Win	2–0–2	Miki Miyauchi	TKO (knees and punches)	Gladiator 81	March 1, 2015	2	0:18	Tokyo, Japan	Won the Gladiator Women’s Bantamweight Championship.
Win	1–0–2	Yukimi Kamikaze	Submission (rear-naked choke)	Road FC 18	August 30, 2014	1	1:57	Seoul, South Korea	Catchweight (132 lb) bout.
Draw	0–0–2	Takayo Hashi	Draw (unanimous)	Road FC: Korea vs. Japan	March 9, 2014	2	5:00	Seoul, South Korea	
Draw	0–0–1	Shizuka Sugiyama	Draw (Majority)	Deep: Cage Impact 2013	November 24, 2013	2	5:00	Tokyo, Japan	Bantamweight debut.

== See also ==
- List of female mixed martial artists
- Deep champions
