= Alexandra Buch =

German mixed martial artist

Alexandra Baron
- Born: Buch; November 26, 1979 (age 46); Hamburg, Germany
- Nationality: German
- Height: 1.75 m (5 ft 9 in)
- Weight: 60 kg (130 lb)
- Fighting out of: Wuppertal, North Rhine-Westphalia, Germany
- Team: MMA Berlin (2009); Alligator Rodeo Team (2010-present)
- Years active: 2009-present

Mixed martial arts record
- Total: 12
- Wins: 8
- By knockout: 2
- By submission: 3
- By decision: 3
- Losses: 4
- By knockout: 1
- By submission: 3

Other information
- Mixed martial arts record from Sherdog
- Last updated on: December 21, 2010

Alexandra Baron (born November 26, 1979) is a German female mixed martial arts (MMA) fighter. She won Jewels' tournament Rough Stone Grand Prix 2009 at the -60 kg category.

== Background ==
Baron was born on November 26, 1979 in Hamburg, Germany. Her birth name is Alexandra Sanchez, and her earlier fights were all under that name. Later she fought as Buch-Sanchez or just Buch.

== Martial arts training ==
Buch started training in martial arts in 1999, training in Muay Thai. She moved to Berlin in search for a new gym (MMA Berlin) and it was there that she started training in grappling and MMA.

== Mixed martial arts career ==
Baron debuted on June 27, 2009 at MMA Berlin's event Turnier #15 "The Rematch", defeating fellow countrywoman Tanja Hoffmann by rear naked choke submission.

Baron next participated in the first round of Jewels Rough Stone GP 2009 –60 kg, facing the favorite and more experienced Japanese star Shizuka Sugiyama, whom Baron controlled during the bout using her reach advantage to defeat her by unanimous decision at Jewels 5th Ring on September 13, 2009.

In her next bout, Baron was defeated via submission (heel hook) by Sheila Gaff at MMA Berlin Turnier #16 on September 26, 2009.

Rebounding from her loss, Baron defeated Katharina Schlosser by TKO (punches) at MMA Berlin Turnier #17 on October 31, 2009.

In the Rough Stone GP 2009 –60 kg final, Baron submitted Japanese fighter Tomoko Morii with an armbar in the first round, winning the tournament.

After returning to Wuppertal and joining Alligator Rodeo Team, Baron competed on September 11, 2010 at Respect Fighting Championship 4, where she faced Dutch fighter Melissa Lan, defeating Lan by majority decision after dominating the first two rounds and enduring a triangle choke in the third round.

February 2, 2013 Alexandra Baron returned to MMA at MMAB - MMA Bundesliga in Herne, North Rhine-Westphalia, Germany to compete against Dutch Jorina Baars. She lost the fight in Round one by Submission (Guillotine Choke).

At Respect.FC 9 in Dormagen, Germany on April 13 Alexandra Buch faced Dutch Megan van Houtum. She won the fight by TKO (Doctor stoppage) due to a cut at the nose of van Houtum.

May 25, 2013 at No Compromises 2 in Hamburg, Germany Buch fought within a 4-women tournament. In the semi-final she defeated Jessy Schwarz by Unanimous decision. She won the final fight vs Anne Merkt via heelhook.

Alexandra Baron lost her next fight on November 7, 2013 against Danish Maria Hougaard-Djursaa at European MMA 7 in Aarhus, Denmark. At Superior Challenge 12 in Malmö, Sweden on May 16, 2015 she was defeated by Swede Lina Akhtar Länsberg by TKO due to ground and pound. The fight was for the Bantamweight title of the promotion.

== Mixed martial arts record ==
Professional record breakdown
14 matches	8 wins	6 losses
By knockout	2	1
By submission	3	4
By decision	3	1

Res.	Record	Opponent	Method	Event	Date	Round	Time	Location	Notes
Loss	8-6-0	Lucie Pudilová	Submission (guillotine choke)	Clash FC: Clash of the Titans	November 19, 2016	1	N/A	Plzeň, Czech Republic	
Loss	8-5-0	Katharina Lehner	Decision (unanimous)	German MMA Championship 7	November 7, 2015	3	5:00	Castrop-Rauxel, Germany	
Loss	8-4-0	Lina Länsberg	TKO (punches and elbows)	Superior Challenge 12	May 16, 2015	1	2:30	Malmö, Sweden	
Loss	8-3-0	Maria Hougaard	Submission (rear-naked choke)	European MMA 7	November 7, 2013	1	4:59	Aarhus, Denmark	
Win	8-2-0	Anne Merkt	Submission (inverted heel hook)	No Compromises 2	May 25, 2013	1	4:54	Hamburg, Germany	No Compromises 2 final
Win	7-2-0	Jessy Schwarz	Decision (unanimous)	No Compromises 2	May 25, 2013	2	5:00	Hamburg, Germany	No Compromises 2 semi-final
Win	6-2-0	Megan van Houtum	TKO (doctor stoppage)	Respect Fighting Championship 9	April 13, 2013	2	N/A	Dormagen, North Rhine-Westphalia, Germany	
Loss	5-2-0	Jorina Baars	Submission (guillotine choke)	MMAB - MMA Bundesliga 1	February 2, 2013	1	N/A	Herne, North Rhine-Westphalia, Germany	
Win	5-1-0	Melissa Lan	Decision (unanimous)	Respect Fighting Championships 4	September 11, 2010	3	5:00	Herne, North Rhine-Westphalia, Germany	
Win	4-1-0	Tomoko Morii	Submission (armbar)	Jewels 6th Ring	December 11, 2009	1	3:39	Kabukicho, Tokyo, Japan	Jewels Rough Stone Grand Prix -60 kg final
Win	3-1-0	Katharina Schlosser	TKO (punches)	MMA Berlin Turnier #17	October 31, 2009	2	4:55	Berlin, Germany	
Loss	2-1-0	Sheila Gaff	Submission (heel hook)	MMA Berlin Turnier #16	September 26, 2009	1	1:59	Berlin, Germany	
Win	2-0-0	Shizuka Sugiyama	Decision (unanimous)	Jewels 5th Ring	September 13, 2009	2	5:00	Kabukicho, Tokyo, Japan	Jewels Rough Stone Grand Prix -60 kg opening round
Win	1-0-0	Tanja Hoffmann	Submission (rear-naked choke)	MMA Berlin Turnier #15	June 28, 2009	3	2:13	Berlin, Germany	

== Championships and accomplishments ==
- Rough Stone GP 2009 –60 kg tournament winner

== See also ==
- List of female mixed martial artists
