= UFC Fight Night: Holm vs. Correia =

UFC mixed martial arts event in 2017

- The poster for UFC Fight Night: Holm vs. Correia
- Promotion: Ultimate Fighting Championship
- Date: June 17, 2017
- Venue: Singapore Indoor Stadium
- City: Kallang, Singapore
- Attendance: 8,414
- Total gate: $839,300

Event chronology
| UFC Fight Night: Lewis vs. Hunt | UFC Fight Night: Holm vs. Correia | UFC Fight Night: Chiesa vs. Lee |

UFC Fight Night: Holm vs. Correia (also known as UFC Fight Night 111) was a mixed martial arts event produced by the Ultimate Fighting Championship held on June 17, 2017, at Singapore Indoor Stadium in Kallang, Singapore.

== Background ==
The event was the second that the promotion has hosted in Singapore, following UFC Fight Night: Saffiedine vs. Lim which was at the Marina Bay Sands in January 2014.

A women's bantamweight bout between former UFC Women's Bantamweight Champion Holly Holm and former title challenger Bethe Correia headlined this event.

Although the pairing was never officially announced by the promotion, Alex Caceres was linked to a bout with promotional newcomer Wang Guan at the event. Instead, Caceres faced another newcomer in Rolando Dy.

Jonathan Meunier was expected to face Li Jingliang at the event. However, Meunier's removal from the card was announced on June 6 due to an alleged injury and was replaced by promotional newcomer Frank Camacho.

At the weigh-ins, Carls John de Tomas came in at 131 lb, five pounds over the flyweight limit of 126 lb. As a result, he was fined 30% of his purse, which went to Naoki Inoue and their bout proceeded as scheduled at a catchweight.

== Results ==
Main Card (UFC Fight Pass)
| Weight class | | | | Method | Round | Time | Notes |
|---|---|---|---|---|---|---|---|
| Women's Bantamweight | Holly Holm | def. | Bethe Correia | KO (head kick and punch) | 3 | 1:09 |
| Heavyweight | Marcin Tybura | def. | Andrei Arlovski | Decision (unanimous) (29–28, 28–27, 29–27) | 3 | 5:00 |
| Welterweight | Colby Covington | def. | Dong Hyun Kim | Decision (unanimous) (30–25, 30–26, 30–27) | 3 | 5:00 |
| Welterweight | Rafael dos Anjos | def. | Tarec Saffiedine | Decision (unanimous) (30–27, 30–27, 29–28) | 3 | 5:00 |
Preliminary Card (UFC Fight Pass)
| Lightweight | Jon Tuck | def. | Takanori Gomi | Submission (rear-naked choke) | 1 | 1:12 |
| Heavyweight | Walt Harris | def. | Cyril Asker | TKO (punches and elbows) | 1 | 1:44 |
| Featherweight | Alex Caceres | def. | Rolando Dy | TKO (doctor stoppage) | 2 | 5:00 |
| Flyweight | Ulka Sasaki | def. | Justin Scoggins | Submission (rear-naked choke) | 2 | 3:19 |
| Welterweight | Li Jingliang | def. | Frank Camacho | Decision (unanimous) (29–27, 28–27, 29–27) | 3 | 5:00 |
| Bantamweight | Russell Doane | def. | Kwan Ho Kwak | TKO (punches) | 1 | 4:09 |
| Catchweight (131 lb) | Naoki Inoue | def. | Carls John de Tomas | Decision (unanimous) (30–26, 30–26, 30–26) | 3 | 5:00 |
| Women's Bantamweight | Lucie Pudilová | def. | Ji Yeon Kim | Decision (unanimous) (29–28, 29–28, 29–28) | 3 | 5:00 |

== Bonus awards ==
The following fighters were awarded $50,000 bonuses:

- Fight of the Night: Li Jingliang vs. Frank Camacho
- Performance of the Night: Holly Holm and Ulka Sasaki

== See also ==
- List of UFC events
- 2017 in UFC
