= Asami Kodera =

Japanese mixed martial artist

- Born: July 28, 1978 (age 48); Tochigi Prefecture, Japan
- Other names: Asami
- Nationality: Japanese
- Height: 1.62 m (5 ft 4 in)
- Weight: 48 kg (106 lb)
- Division: Strawweight
- Fighting out of: Kawaguchi, Saitama, Japan
- Team: Purebred Kawaguchi Redips
- Years active: 2002-present

Mixed martial arts record
- Total: 8
- Wins: 5
- By submission: 4
- By decision: 1
- Losses: 3
- By submission: 1
- By decision: 2

Other information
- Mixed martial arts record from Sherdog

Asami Kodera (小寺 麻美, Kodera Asami), occasionally nicknamed Asami, is a Japanese female mixed martial artist. She currently fights in the Jewels promotion, where she won the 2009 Jewels Rough Stone Grand Prix (48 kg & under).

== Early life ==
Kodera was born on July 28, 1978 in Tochigi Prefecture, Japan.

== Mixed martial arts career ==
Kodera debuted in mixed martial arts on November 9, 2002, defeating Nana Ichikawa by armbar submission at Smackgirl - Japan Cup 2002 Episode 2. In her next fight, almost two years later, she was defeated by rear naked choke by Mari Kaneko at Golden Muscle - Strongest Queen Tournament on May 7, 2004.

Three years later, Kodera fought and defeated Mamiko Mizoguchi by armbar at Kingdom of Grapple - Live 2007 on November 25, 2007. Kodera would return to Smackgirl, losing against Masako Yoshida by unanimous decision. Her next fight was against Mika Nagano, who defeated Kodera by split decision on April 25, 2008.

After the demise of Smackgirl and one year after her previous fight, Kodera debuted in the Jewels promotion with an armbar submission victory over Yukiko Seki on July 11, 2009 at Jewels 4th Ring. Kodera would then participate in the 2009 Rough Stone Grand Prix 48 kg tournament, defeating Misaki Ozawa by submission (armbar) on September 13, 2009 and Kikuyo Ishikawa by decision (unanimous) on December 11, 2009 to win the tournament.

== Mixed martial arts record ==
Professional record breakdown
8 matches	5 wins	3 losses
By submission	4	1
By decision	1	2

Res.	Record	Opponent	Method	Event	Date	Round	Time	Location	Notes
Win	5-3-0	Kikuyo Ishikawa	Decision (unanimous)	Jewels 6th Ring	December 11, 2009	2	5:00	Kabukicho, Tokyo, Japan	2009 Jewels Rough Stone Grand Prix 48kg final
Win	4-3-0	Misaki Ozawa	Submission (armbar)	Jewels 5th Ring	September 13, 2009	2	1:56	Kabukicho, Tokyo, Japan	2009 Jewels Rough Stone Grand Prix 48kg opening round
Win	3-3-0	Yukiko Seki	Submission (armbar)	Jewels 4th Ring	July 11, 2009	1	4:47	Tokyo, Japan	
Loss	2-3-0	Mika Nagano	Decision (split)	Smackgirl - World ReMix 2008 Second Round	April 25, 2008	2	5:00	Bunkyo, Tokyo, Japan	
Loss	2-2-0	Masako Yoshida	Decision (unanimous)	Smackgirl - World ReMix 2008 Opening Round	February 14, 2008	2	5:00	Bunkyo, Tokyo, Japan	
Win	2-1-0	Mamiko Mizoguchi	Submission (armbar)	Kingdom of Grapple - Live 2007	November 25, 2007	2	1:49	Kabukicho, Tokyo, Japan	
Loss	1-1-0	Mari Kaneko	Submission (rear-naked choke)	Golden Muscle - Strongest Queen Tournament	May 7, 2004	1	1:17	Tokyo, Japan	
Win	1-0-0	Nana Ichikawa	Submission (armbar)	Smackgirl - Japan Cup 2002 Episode 2	November 9, 2002	1	2:08	Tokyo, Japan	

== Championships and accomplishments ==
- 2009 Jewels Rough Stone Grand Prix 48 kg Champion

== See also ==
- List of female mixed martial artists
