= Yoko Yamada =

Japanese professional wrestler

- Born: May 25, 1979 (age 47); Tokyo, Japan
- Other names: Iron Beauty
- Nationality: Japanese
- Height: 1.55 m (5 ft 1 in)
- Weight: 43 kg (95 lb)
- Fighting out of: Tokyo, Japan
- Team: Purebred
- Years active: 2003–present

Mixed martial arts record
- Total: 7
- Wins: 6
- By knockout: 1
- By submission: 4
- By decision: 1
- Losses: 1
- By submission: 1

Other information
- Notable relatives: Yoko Minamida (aunt)
- Website: Official blog
- Mixed martial arts record from Sherdog
- Last updated on: September 4, 2011

Yoko Yamada
Medal record

Representing Japan

Women's arm wrestling

World Armwrestling Championship
Bronze medal – third place	2004 Durban	50 kg, right hand
Bronze medal – third place	2004 Durban	50 kg, left hand
Gold medal – first place	2005 Tokyo	45 kg, right hand
Silver medal – second place	2005 Tokyo	45 kg, right hand

Yoko Yamada (山田 洋子, Yamada Yōko; ring name: 山田 よう子) (born May 25, 1979) is a Japanese female arm wrestler, professional wrestler, mixed martial artist and occasional ring girl. Nicknamed The Sturdy Arm (剛腕, Gōwan) and Iron Beauty, she also works as a talent for the Tokyo-based agency KT Project (KTプロジェクト, KT Purojekuto).

Yamada has been the Japan Arm Wrestling Association (JAWA) female champion since 2002 and became the World Armwrestling Federation (WAF) champion in the 45 kg right hand division and second place in the left hand division in 2005.

== Background ==
Yamada was born on May 25, 1979 in Tokyo, Japan. Yamada practiced swimming until 1994 and played badminton during high school. After finishing high school, she was unsure what to do next until 1999 when she, at 20 years old, met an arm wrestler in a restaurant that inspired her and made her decide to try arm wrestling.

== Arm wrestling ==
In 2000, Yamada got the fourth place in the JAWA All-Japan Championships in the women's left hand 50 kg and women's right hand 45 kg and 50 kg divisions.

In 2001, Yamada got the third place in the JAWA All-Japan Championships in the women's right hand 50 kg category.

In 2002, Yamada got the first place in the All-Japan Championships in the women's left hand 50 kg category and second place in the right hand 50 kg category.

Yamada repeated her previous performance in 2003, this time winning in both right and left hand 50 kg categories and also placing second in both hands 55 kg categories.

Yamada placed fourth in the 50 kg category in both left and right arm classes at the WAF World Championship 2003 held in Ottawa, Ontario, Canada.

In 2004 Yamada once again won the women's right and left hand -50 kg categories and also was the runner up in the left hand -55 kg division.

Also in 2004, Yamada was third place in both left and right hand 50 kg women's divisions at the WAF World Championships held in Durban, KwaZulu-Natal, South Africa.

Continuing her winning streak, in 2005 Yamada won the 23rd All-Japan Arm Wrestling Championships in left and right hands -45 kg categories and right hand -50 kg.

At the WAF World Armwrestling Championship 2005 held in Tokyo, Japan Yamada won the 45 kg right hand division and placed second in the left hand division.

In the All-Japan championships 2006, Yamada won the first place in the women's right hand -50 kg, -55 kg, -60 kg and women's left hand -50 kg.

Yamada was unable to participate in the 2006 World Championship since the minimum weight was raised to 50 kg.

Once again dominating in the All-Japan Championships, in 2007 Yamada won in both hands in the -50 and -55 kg categories and also achieved second place in the right hand -60 kg category and fourth in the +60 kg.

In 2008 Yamada controlled all the women's categories in both hands at the All-Japan Championships, winning the first place in all categories for both hands, with the exception of the +60 kg categories where she got third place in both hands.

Yamada once again showed her dominance in the All-Japan Championships 2009, winning in both hands the -50 kg and -55 kg divisions.

In 2010 Yamada once again won the same categories that she won in 2009 performance at the 28th All-Japan Arm Wrestling Championships.

== Mixed martial arts career ==
After watching mixed martial arts (MMA) on TV, she became interested on them. Inspired by Gary Goodridge, another arm wrestling champion that competed in MMA, Yamada elected to use Goodridge's theme, Queen's "We Will Rock You", for her MMA entrance theme.

Yamada made her MMA debut on April 2, 2003 at Smackgirl's event Smackgirl: Third Season II, where she defeated Kazumi Sakaguchi by guillotine choke submission in 69 seconds.

Two years later, Yamada's second victory came on August 17, 2005 at Smackgirl 2005: Dynamic!!, submitting Haruka Onuki with a rear naked choke in the first round.

Debuting in Shooto, Yamada continued her winning streak by defeating Mayuko Kasaki via submission (guillotine choke) in the first round at G-Shooto Plus 05 on February 24, 2006.

At G-Shooto Japan 05 on May 6, 2006 Yamada defeated Azusa Anzai in only ten seconds with an armbar submission, earning her fourth consecutive win.

Yamada first defeat was at the hands of Maho Muranami on August 19, 2006 at the event Wrestle Expo 2006, where Muranami submitted Yamada with an armbar in the first round.

Almost two years later, Yamada got another win when she knocked out Nana Ichikawa in the first minute of their bout at Deep Glove 2 on June 15, 2008.

Debuting with Jewels promotion, Yamada defeated Miyoko Kusaka by unanimous decision on December 11, 2009 at Jewels 6th Ring.

== Shoot boxing ==
On August 19, 2011, Yamada faced Mio Tsumura alias "Mio Kubota" in a shoot boxing match at the 2011 Shoot Boxing Girls S-Cup. She was defeated by disqualification after failing to obey the referee's commands.

== Professional wrestling ==
Yamada debuted in pro-wrestling with S Ovation's and Mariko Yoshida's promotion Ibuki on July 2, 2006.

Yamada continues to perform occasionally as a freelancer.

== Talent ==
Yamada works as a talent girl and is affiliated to the KT Project agency. She has appeared as a gravure model in some DVDs and photobooks.

Yamada also appeared as a ring girl at the event Deep Glove 3 on September 20, 2008.

== Internet show ==
From April 7, 2007 to June 30, 2007 Yamada hosted an Internet television show called Yoko Yamada's Happy Girl (山田よう子のHAPPY GIRL, yamada yōko no happy girl) which was produced by Internet broadcaster Ah! To Odoroku Hōsō Kyoku (あっ!とおどろく放送局).

== Personal life ==
Yamada is bisexual. She has two brothers and Yoko Minamida was her aunt.

Yamada was subjected to bullying in junior high school and it caused her to stop going to school for some time. During her teens Yamada beat the leader of a girl's gang and four of the girl's friends for which she was sent to a juvenile correctional facility.

After her parents divorced, her father disappeared for five years due to money problems occasioned by his gambling habits until he had a stroke that left him hospitalized and with cognitive problems and Yamada has taken care of him since then.

== Mixed martial arts record ==
Professional record breakdown
7 matches	6 wins	1 loss
By knockout	1	0
By submission	4	1
By decision	1	0

Res.	Record	Opponent	Method	Event	Date	Round	Time	Location	Notes
Win	6-1	Miyoko Kusaka	Decision (unanimous)	Jewels 6th Ring	December 11, 2009	2	5:00	Tokyo, Japan	
Win	5-1	Nana Ichikawa	KO (punch)	Deep: Glove 2	June 15, 2008	1	1:00	Tokyo, Japan	
Loss	4-1	Maho Muranami	Technical submission (armbar)	Wrestle Expo 2006	August 19, 2006	1	1:14	Tokyo, Japan	
Win	4-0	Azusa Anzai	Submission (armbar)	G-Shooto: G-Shooto 05	May 6, 2006	1	0:10	Tokyo, Japan	
Win	3-0	Mayuko Kasaki	Submission (guillotine choke)	G-Shooto: Plus05	February 24, 2006	1	4:37	Tokyo, Japan	
Win	2-0	Haruka Onuki	Submission (rear-naked choke)	Smackgirl 2005: Dynamic!!	August 17, 2005	1	4:12	Tokyo, Japan	
Win	1-0	Kazumi Sakaguchi	Submission (guillotine choke)	Smackgirl: Third Season II	April 2, 2003	1	1:09	Tokyo, Japan	

== See also ==
- List of female mixed martial artists
